= List of radio stations in Eastern Visayas =

The following is a list of NTC-licensed radio stations in Eastern Visayas, a region of the Philippines, current as of 2025. The tables can be sorted by call sign, branding, frequency, location, owner, languages and radio format. Also included below are defunct radio stations and Internet-only stations.

== Radio stations ==
Call sign	Branding	Frequency	Location	Owner	Languages	Format	RDS ID
DYAB-FM	Dream Radio	104.7 FM	Tacloban	Allied Broadcasting Center (operated by Prime Media Services)	Waray, Tagalog	masa/Contemporary MOR, OPM	
DYAJ-FM	Juander Radyo Ormoc	90.3 FM	Ormoc City	Word Broadcasting Corporation (operated by RSV Broadcasting Network)	Waray, Cebuano, Tagalog	masa/Contemporary MOR, OPM, news, talk	
DYAS	Like Radio Maasin	106.1 FM	Maasin, Southern Leyte	Capitol Broadcasting Center	English, Tagalog, Cebuano	top 40/CHR, OPM	
DYAW	Lamrag Radio Tacloban	89.5 FM	Tacloban	Aliw Broadcasting Corporation	Waray, Tagalog	Soft AC, news/talk	
DYBK	Groove FM	92.5 FM	Baybay, Leyte	Wave Network	Cebuano	masa/Contemporary MOR, OPM	
DYCJ	One FM Tacloban	96.7 FM	Tacloban	Radyo Pilipino Corporation	Tagalog, Waray	masa/contemporary MOR, OPM	
DYCZ	Brigada News FM Ormoc	93.5 FM	Ormoc	Brigada Mass Media Corporation	Tagalog, Waray	masa/Contemporary MOR, News, Talk	
DYDC	DYDC 104.7	104.7 FM	Baybay, Leyte	Visayas State University (Presidential Broadcast Service affiliate)	Tagalog, Cebuano	Campus radio	
DYDM	DYDM Maasin	1548 AM	Maasin, Southern Leyte	Roman Catholic Diocese of Maasin (Catholic Media Network)	Tagalog, Cebuano	Roman Catholic Religious broadcasting	
DYDR	FMR Tacloban	100.7 FM	Tacloban	Philippine Collective Media Corporation	Tagalog, Waray	masa/Contemporary MOR, OPM, news, talk	FMR100.7
DYDV	Infinite Radio Villaba	94.9 FM	Villaba, Leyte	St. Jude Thaddeus Institute of Technology	Waray, Cebuano, Tagalog	masa/Contemporary MOR, OPM	
DYMP	Idol Radio Palo	88.1 FM	Palo, Leyte	Intercontinental Broadcasting Corporation	Tagalog, Waray	news, Talk	
DYES-AM	Radyo Pilipinas Borongan	657 AM	Borongan, Eastern Samar	Presidential Broadcast Service	Tagalog, Waray	news, talk	
DYFE	97.5 DYFE	97.5 FM	Tacloban	Far East Broadcasting Company	Waray	Evangelical Religious broadcasting	DYFE-FM
DYIP	Infinite Radio Calbayog	92.1 FM	Calbayog, Samar	St. Jude Thaddeus Institute of Technology	Waray, Tagalog	masa/contemporary MOR, OPM	
DYIX	Brigada News FM Calbayog	100.5 FM	Calbayog, Samar	Brigada Mass Media Corporation (operated by Baycomms Broadcasting Corporation)	Waray, Tagalog	masa/Contemporary MOR, OPM, news, talk	
DYJC	Lighthouse 104.5	104.5 FM	Catarman, Northern Samar	Sumoroy Broadcasting Corporation (operated by Lighthouse Baptist Church)	Waray, English, Tagalog	Evangelical Religious broadcasting	
DYJM	Like Radio Catarman	90.1 FM	Catarman, Northern Samar	Capitol Broadcasting Center	Waray, Tagalog	masa/Contemporary MOR, OPM	
DYLA	A!FM	106.5 FM	Allen, Northern Samar	Polytechnic Foundation of Cotabato and Asia	Tagalog, Waray	masa/Contemporary MOR, OPM, news, talk	
DYLC	Love Radio Catarman	94.1 FM	Catarman, Northern Samar	MBC Media Group	Tagalog, Waray	masa/Contemporary MOR, OPM	
DYMS-AM	Aksyon Radyo Catbalogan	1044 AM	Catbalogan, Samar	MBC Media Group (operated by Cebu Broadcasting Company)	Tagalog, Waray	news, talk	
DYMS-FM	MSFM 105.3	105.3 FM	Catbalogan, Samar	PEC Broadcasting Corporation	Tagalog, Waray	news, talk	
DYNF	Radyo Kauswagan	91.3 FM	Borongan, Eastern Samar	National Nutrition Council	Waray	Community radio (Nutriskwela Community Radio)	
DYNG	Radyo Kausbawan	103.1 FM	Palompon, Leyte	National Nutrition Council (operated by Palompon Institute of Technology)	Waray	Community radio (Nutriskwela Community Radio)	
DYNN	Radyo Kasugbong	97.3 FM	Catarman, Northern Samar	National Nutrition Council	Waray	Community radio (Nutriskwela Community Radio)	
DYNS	UEP FM Catarman	102.9 FM	Catarman, Northern Samar	University of Eastern Philippines	Waray	Campus radio	
DYOG	Radyo Pilipinas Calbayog	882 AM	Calbayog, Samar	Presidential Broadcast Service	Tagalog, Waray	news, talk	
DYPA (DYDR relay)	FMR Borongan	101.7 FM	Borongan, Eastern Samar	Philippine Collective Media Corporation	Tagalog, Waray	masa/Contemporary MOR, OPM, news, talk	
DYPC (DYDR relay)	FMR Calbayog	88.5 FM	Calbayog, Samar	Philippine Collective Media Corporation	Tagalog, Waray	masa/Contemporary MOR, OPM, news, talk	
DYPF (DYDR relay)	FMR Catbalogan	106.9 FM	Catbalogan, Samar	Philippine Collective Media Corporation	Tagalog, Waray	masa/Contemporary MOR, OPM, news, talk	
DYPH	Radyo Kidlat Tolosa	90.3 FM	Tolosa, Leyte	Don Orestes Romualdez Electric Cooperative (operated by Presidential Broadcast Service)	Waray	Community radio (Radyo Kidlat)	
DYPL	Radyo Kidlat Ormoc	94.3 FM	Ormoc	Leyte 5 Electric Cooperative (Operated By Presidential Broadcast Service)	Waray	Community radio (Radyo Kidlat)	
DYRG	Blue Radio	101.5 FM	Ormoc City	Wave Network	Tagalog, Cebuano	Contemporary MOR, news, talk	
DYRK	Radyo Kalgara	94.5 FM	Carigara, Leyte	Soundstream Broadcasting Corporation	Tagalog, Waray	Contemporary MOR, news, talk	
DYRN	Radyo Natin Laoang	90.9 FM	Laoang, Northern Samar	MBC Media Group	Tagalog, Waray	Community radio (Radyo Natin)	
DYSA	Radyo Natin Baybay	102.9 FM	Baybay, Leyte	MBC Media Group	Tagalog, Waray	Community radio (Radyo Natin)	
DYLX	OKFM Sogod	102.1 FM	Sogod, Southern Leyte	PBN Broadcasting Network	Tagalog, Cebuano	masa/Contemporary MOR, OPM, news/ talk	
DYSC	Radyo Natin Sogod	103.1 FM	Sogod, Southern Leyte	MBC Media Group	Tagalog, Cebuano	Community radio (Radyo Natin)	
DYSD	Radyo Natin Borongan	104.1 FM	Borongan, Eastern Samar	MBC Media Group	Tagalog, Waray	Community radio (Radyo Natin)	
DYSG	Radyo Natin Guiuan	103.7 FM	Guiuan, Eastern Samar	MBC Media Group	Tagalog, Waray	Community radio (Radyo Natin)	
DYSH	Radyo Natin Oras	104.1 FM	Oras, Eastern Samar	MBC Media Group	Tagalog, Waray	Community radio (Radyo Natin)	
DYSI-FM	Radyo Natin Calbayog	104.9 FM	Calbayog, Samar	MBC Media Group	Tagalog, Waray	Community radio (Radyo Natin)	
DYDD-FM	Radyo Pilipinas Sogod	104.7 FM	Sogod, Southern Leyte	Presidential Broadcast Service	Tagalog, Cebuano	news, talk	
DYSM-AM	Aksyon Radyo Catarman	972 AM	Catarman, Northern Samar	MBC Media Group (operated by Cebu Broadcasting Company)	Tagalog, Waray	news, talk	
DYSN	Radyo Natin Allen	105.7 FM	Allen, Northern Samar	MBC Media Group	Tagalog, Waray	Community radio (Radyo Natin)	
DYTA	XFM Tacloban	99.9 FM	Tacloban	Wave Network (operated by Y2H Broadcasting Network)	Tagalog, Waray	masa/contemporary MOR, OPM, news/talk	*RDS*
DYTG	K5 News FM Tacloban	103.1 FM	Tacloban	Tagbilaran Broadcasting System (operated by Bandera News Philippines)	Waray, Tagalog	news, talk	BANDERA
DYTH-AM	DZRH Tacloban	990 AM	Tacloban	MBC Media Group	Tagalog	news, talk	
DYTM-FM	Love Radio Tacloban	91.1 FM	Tacloban	MBC Media Group	Tagalog	masa/Contemporary MOR, OPM	DYTM-FM
DYTX	Bombo Radyo Tacloban	95.1 FM	Tacloban	Bombo Radyo Philippines (operated by Newsounds Broadcasting Network)	Waray, Tagalog	news, talk	1. Basta 2. Radyo 3. Bombo!
DYTY	Brigada News FM Tacloban	93.5 FM	Tacloban	Baycomms Broadcasting Corporation (operated by Brigada Mass Media Corporation)	Waray, Tagalog	news, talk, masa/Contemporary MOR, OPM	
DYVE	RVFM	89.7 FM	Borongan, Eastern Samar	Wave Network	Waray	masa/Contemporary MOR, OPM	
DYVL-AM	Aksyon Radyo Tacloban	819 AM	Tacloban	MBC Media Group	Tagalog, Waray	news, talk	
DYVW	DYVW	1368 AM	Borongan, Eastern Samar	Catholic Media Network	Waray	Roman Catholic Religious broadcasting	
DYWA	One Radio 101.3	101.3 FM	Catbalogan, Samar	Wave Network	Waray, Tagalog	masa/Contemporary MOR, OPM, news, talk	
DYXC	Radyo Natin Ormoc	107.1 FM	Ormoc City	MBC Media Group (operated by Pacific Broadcasting System)	Tagalog, Waray	Community radio (Radyo Natin)	
DYXV	Magik FM Tacloban	98.3 FM	Tacloban	Century Broadcasting Network	Tagalog, Waray	masa/Contemporary MOR, OPM	
DYXY	RMN iFM Tacloban	99.1 FM	Tacloban	Radio Mindanao Network	Tagalog, Waray	masa/Contemporary MOR, OPM, news, talk	RMN iFM
TBD	B 107.9 FM	107.9 FM	Tacloban	Prime Media Services (operated by TV5 Network Inc.)	Waray, Tagalog	masa/Contemporary MOR, OPM, news, talk	
TBD	Radyo Bandera News FM Catarman	99.5FM	Catarman, Northern Samar	Palawan Broadcasting Corporation (Operated by K5 Broadcasting Network)	Tagalog, Waray	news, talk	
TBD	KJM FM	94.3 FM	Borongan, Samar	Prime Broadcasting Network	Tagalog, Waray	Adult hits, OPM, Talk	
TBD	Lamrag Radio Catbalogan	95.7 FM	Catbalogan, Samar	Aliw Broadcasting Corporation	Tagalog, Waray	news, talk	
DYAE	FMR Maasin	96.5 FM	Maasin, Southern Leyte	Philippine Collective Media Corporation	Tagalog, Waray	masa/Contemporary MOR, OPM, news, talk	
TBD	Voice FM Borongan	105.7 FM	Borongan, Eastern Samar	Word Broadcasting Corporation	Tagalog, Waray	Roman Catholic Religious broadcasting	
TBD	Mix FM Tacloban	106.1 FM	Tacloban	Stunting	Tagalog, Waray		
DYMB	Best FM	89.7 FM	Mayorga, Leyte	Stunting	Tagalog, Waray		
TBD	CAR Radio	103.7 FM	Santo Niño, Samar	Cabungaan Seventh-day Adventist Church	Tagalog, Cebuano	Seventh-day Adventist Church Religious broadcasting	
TBD	Lamrag Radio Calbayog	99.7 FM	Calbayog, Samar	Aliw Broadcasting Corporation	Tagalog, Waray	news, talk	
government-owned/operated station: Station under NTC provisional authority and/or on test broadcast.

== See also ==
- List of radio stations in the Philippines
