= DWNH =

Radio station in Occidental Mindoro, Philippines

Radyo Kapalayawan (DWNH)
- Paluan; Philippines
- Broadcast area: Paluan and surrounding areas
- Frequency: 100.1 MHz
- Branding: 100.1 Radyo Kapalayawan

Programming
- Languages: Mangyan, Filipino
- Format: Community Radio
- Network: Nutriskwela Community Radio

Ownership
- Owner: National Nutrition Council

History
- First air date: November 17, 2017
- Call sign meaning: Nutrition and Health

Technical information
- Licensing authority: NTC
- Power: 200 watts
- ERP: 500 watts

DWNH (100.1 FM), broadcasting as 100.1 Radyo Kapalayawan, is a radio station owned and operated by the National Nutrition Council under the Nutriskwela Community Radio Network. Its studios and transmitter are located at the Pamilihang Bayan, Paluan. "Kapalayawan" stands for love in Mangyan.
