= Sugar industry in the Philippines =

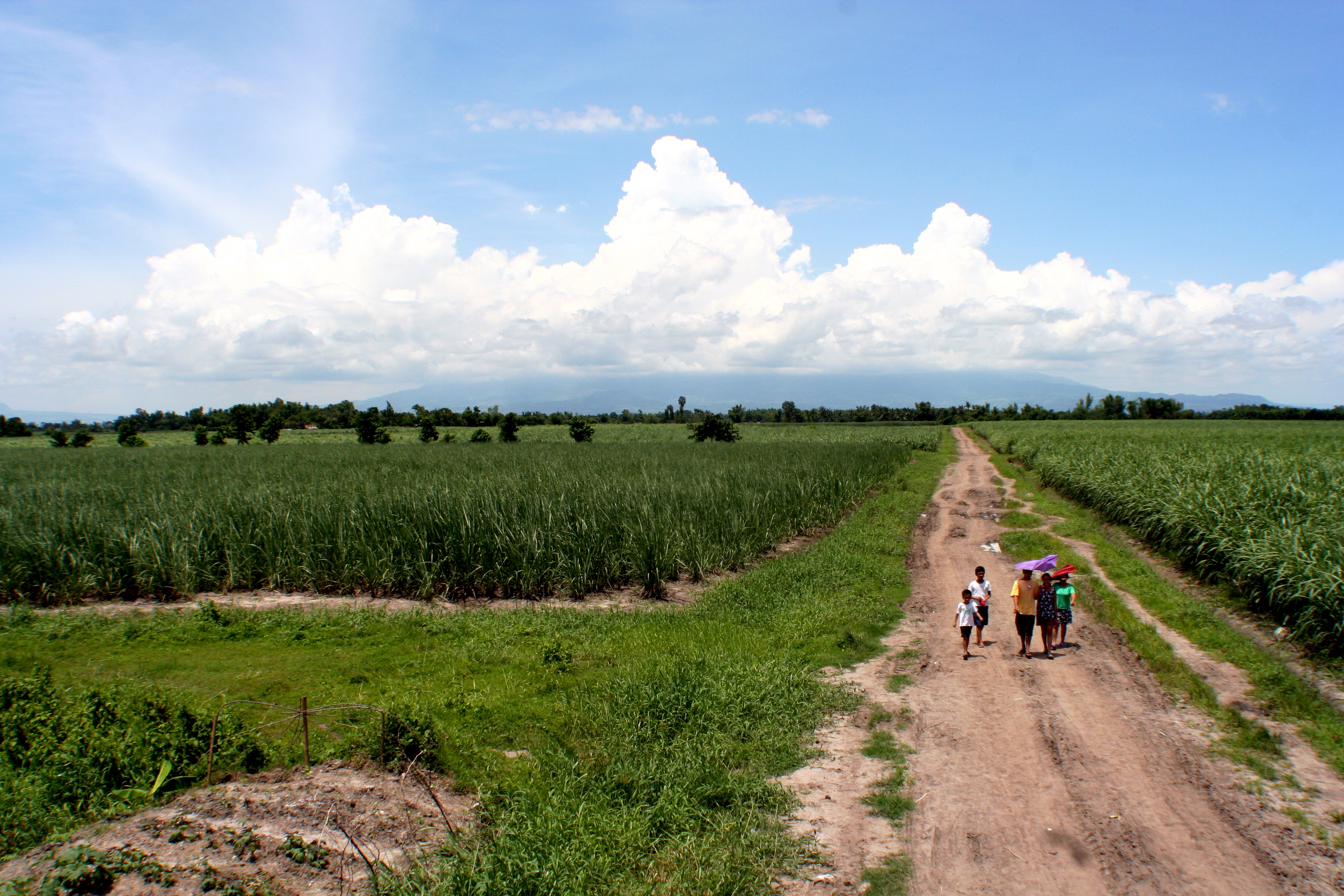
Sugarcane fields at the base of Mount Kanlaon in Negros Island

As of 2025, the Philippines produced 2,085,000 metric tons of sugar, ranking 16th in the world according to sugar production. In 2005, the Philippines was the ninth largest sugar producer in the world and second largest sugar producer among the Association of Southeast Asian Nations (ASEAN) countries, after Thailand, according to Food and Agriculture Organization. At least seventeen provinces of the Philippines have grown sugarcane, of which the two on Negros Island account for half of the nation's total production, and sugar is one of the Philippines' most important agricultural exports. In crop year 2009–2010, 29 sugar mills are operational, divided as follows: thirteen mills on Negros, six mills on Luzon, four mills on Panay, three mills in Eastern Visayas and three mills on Mindanao. As of crop year 2023–2024, 25 mills are operational. Of 25 sugar mills, 11 have their own sugar refineries. Among the major island groups, Visayas has the greatest number of operational mills with 17, 13 of which are from Negros Island alone.

Sugarcane is not a sensitive crop and can be grown in almost all types of soil, from sandy to clay loams and from acidic volcanic soils to calcareous sedimentary deposits. The harvest period is from October to December and ends in May.

In 2015, the National Commission for Culture and the Arts of the Philippines announced that they would include the Industrial Sugar Central Sites of the Philippines and related properties to the UNESCO World Heritage List.

== History ==
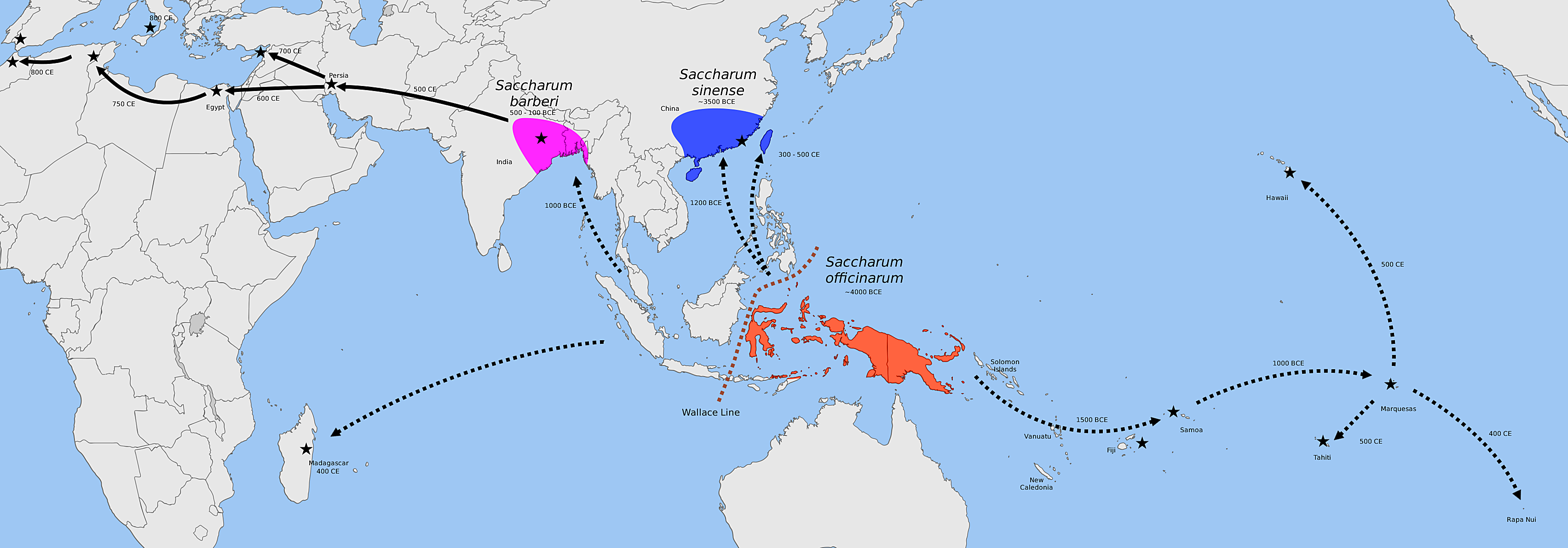
Map showing centers of origin of Saccharum officinarum in New Guinea, S. sinensis in southern China and Taiwan, and S. barberi in India; dotted arrows represent Austronesian introductions

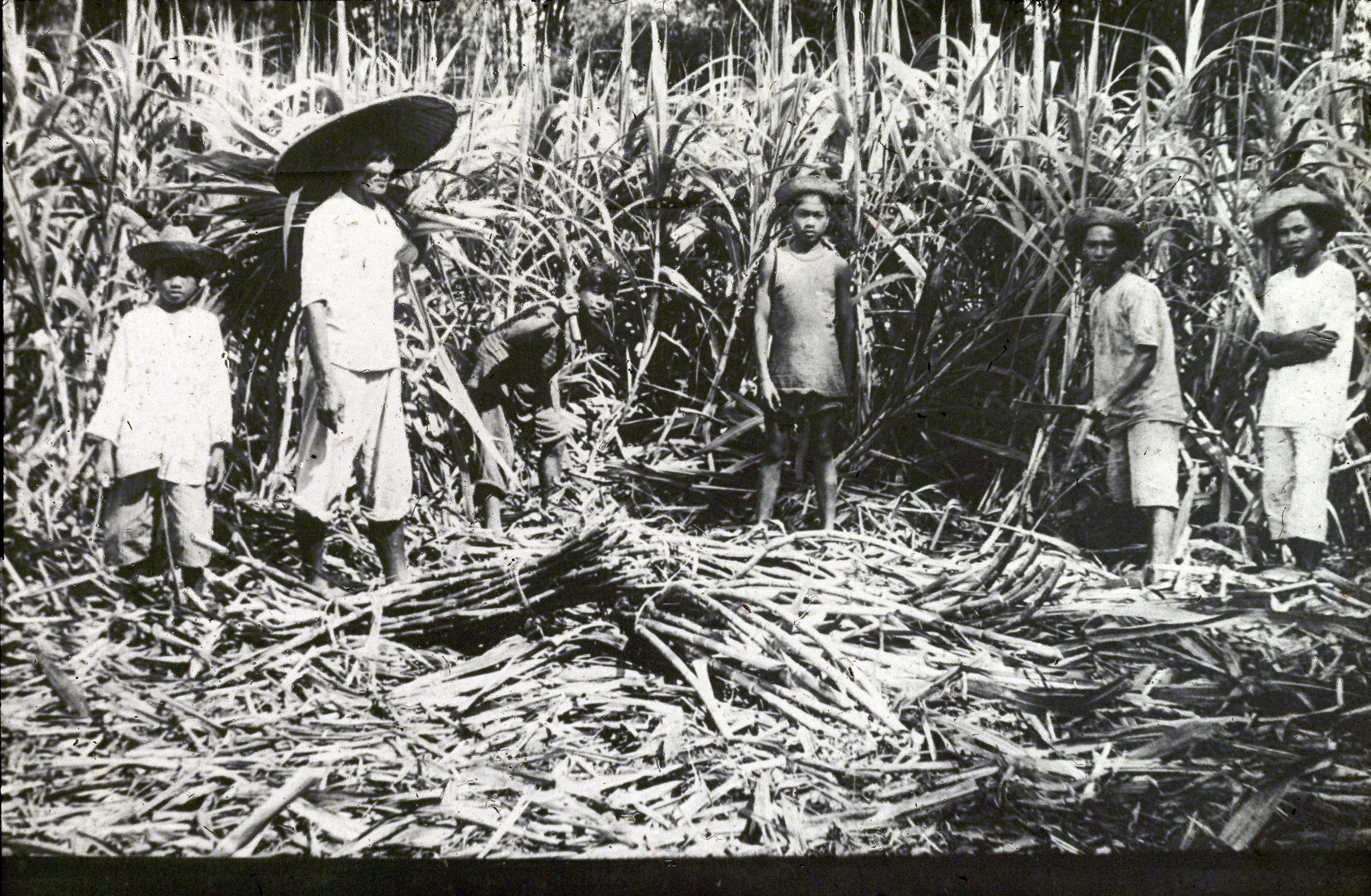
Sugar cane cutting in the Philippines, circa pre-1935

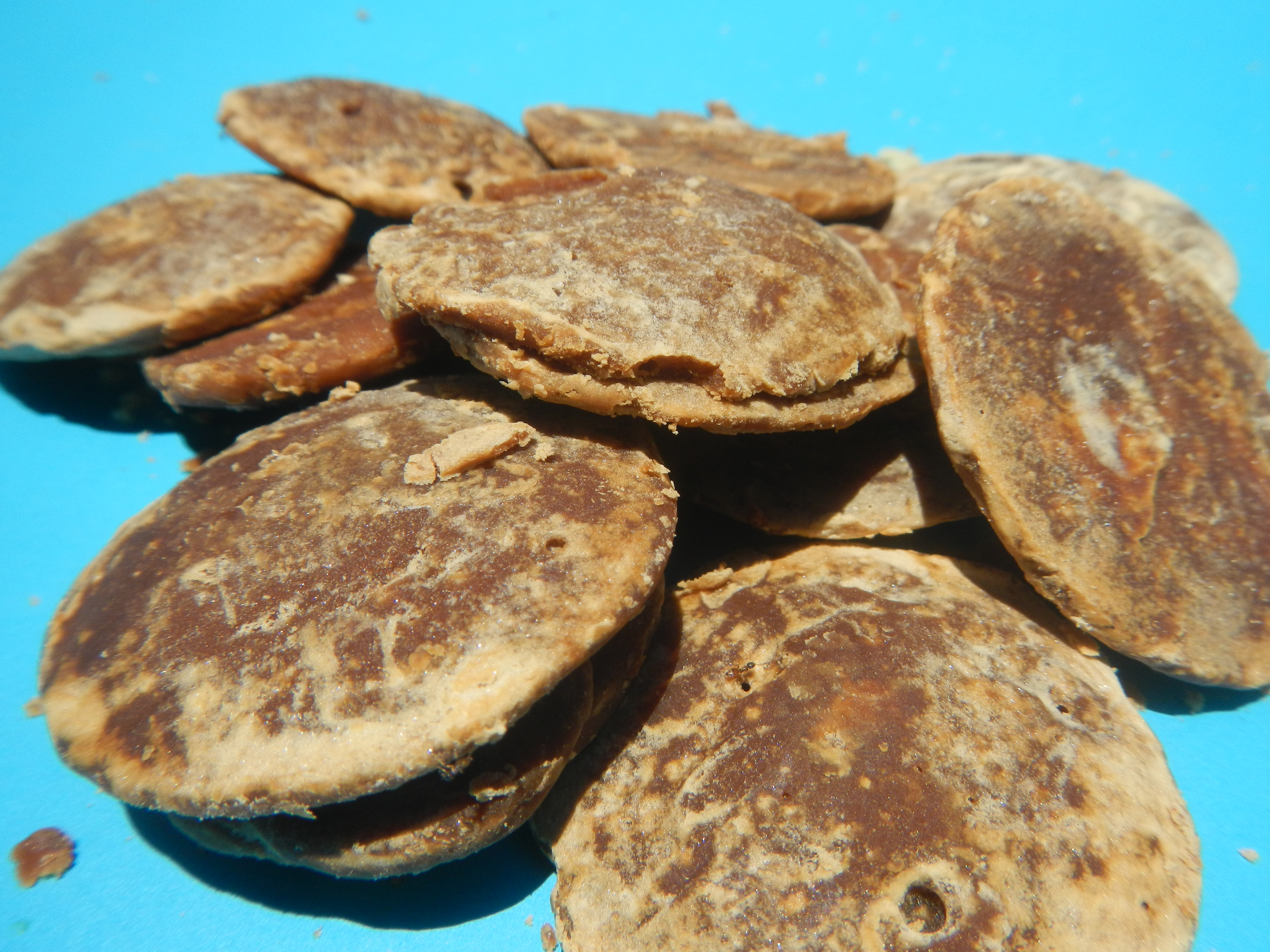
Philippine panutsa, a native jaggery made from sugarcane juice

The history of the sugarcane cultivation in the Philippines predates Spanish colonization. Sugarcane, specifically Saccharum sinense, is one of the original major crops of the Austronesian peoples (which includes Filipinos), since at least 3500 BCE. It reached the Philippines from Taiwan with the Austronesian Expansion by around 2200 BCE. Words for sugarcane are reconstructed as *təbuS or *CebuS in Proto-Austronesian, which became *tebuh in Proto-Malayo-Polynesian (cf. Filipino tubó). Saccharum officinarum was later acquired from early farming cultures in Papua New Guinea and gradually replaced S. sinense throughout its cultivated range in maritime Southeast Asia.

Sugarcane was traditionally used in the pre-colonial Philippines for making various native jaggery products (collectively called panutsa, like pakombuk, sangkaka and bagkat bao) used in cooking. It was also widely used to make traditional wines like palek, byais, basi, intus, and pangasi. Sugarcane juice is also fermented into traditional cane vinegars in the Philippines (variously called sukang basi, sukang maasim, or sukang iloko). Traditional cane vinegar is associated with sugarcane wine-making.

Sugarcane farming became an industry after 1856 when Nicholas Loney, a British Vice-Consul, was sent to Iloilo City and convinced the American house of Russell & Sturgis to open a branch in Iloilo for the purpose of giving crop loans to sugar planters. Loney through his firm, Loney and Kee Company, facilitated the fast development of sugar industry by importing sugar cuttings from Sumatra and machinery from England and Scotland to Iloilo, which the sugar planters can buy on easy installment loans. Loney also built sailing boats called lorcha (boat)s, patterned after the Brixham trawlers used for deep-sea fishing in the English channel, at Buenavista on Guimaras Island to transport sugar from Negros Island. Envisioning the prosperity of a sugar industry in Visayas in the near future, Loney initiated its development in Negros and offered liberal terms to a few Negrense planters similar to those he had given the Ilonggo planters. Consequently, some prominent Ilonggo sugarcane planters like the Ledesma, Lacson, Hilado, Cosculluela, Pérez, Alvarez, Sotamayor and Escanilla families moved to Negros in 1857 due to its promising development. The raw sugar which the Visayas' main product was exported to the United States, England and Australia. Crystal grain sugar was the product of Manila which was exported primarily to Spain.

=== The Philippines main agricultural export commodity (late 1700s–1970s) ===
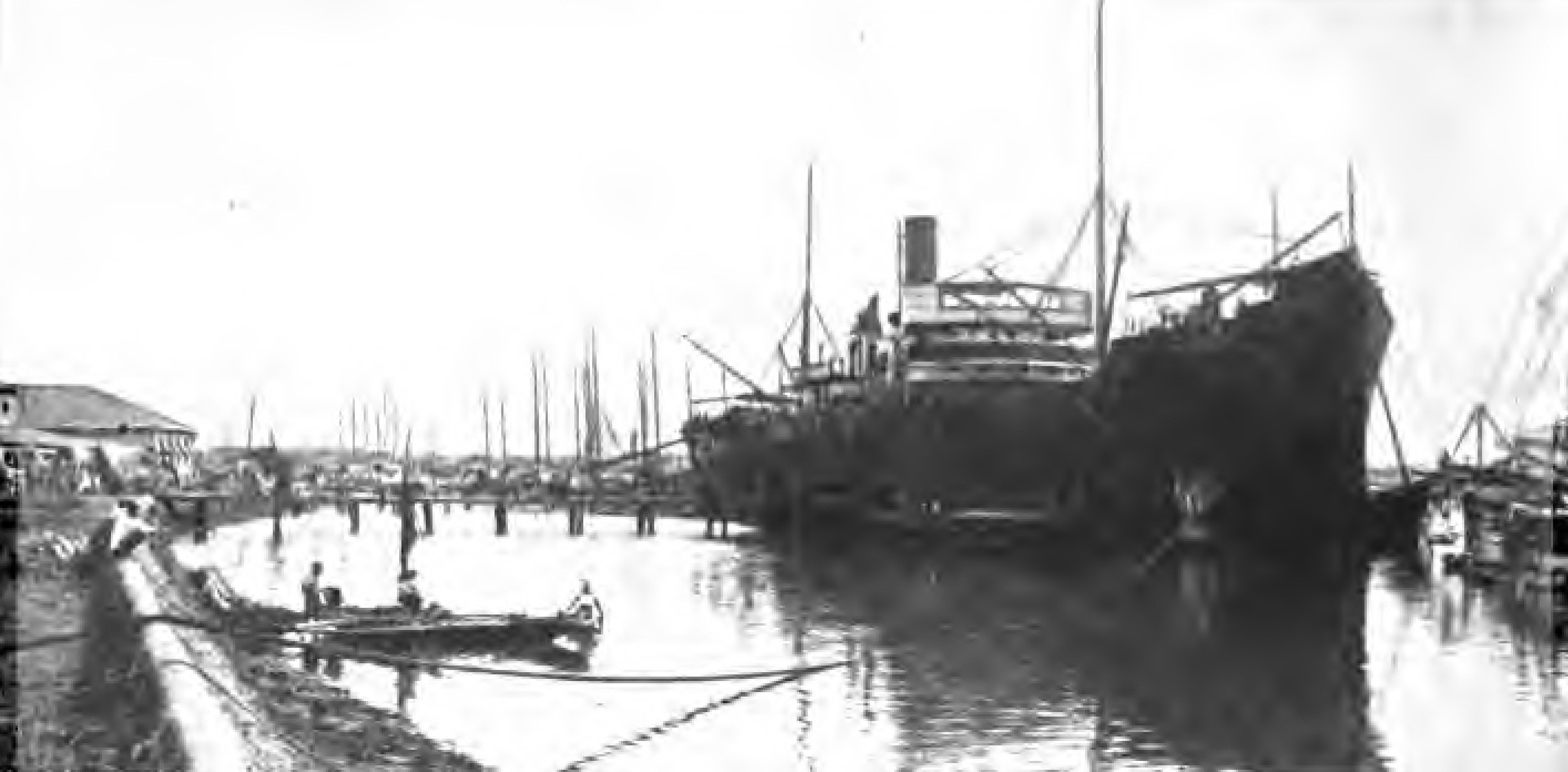
Loading sugar onto an ocean steamer at the Iloilo Port, 1917

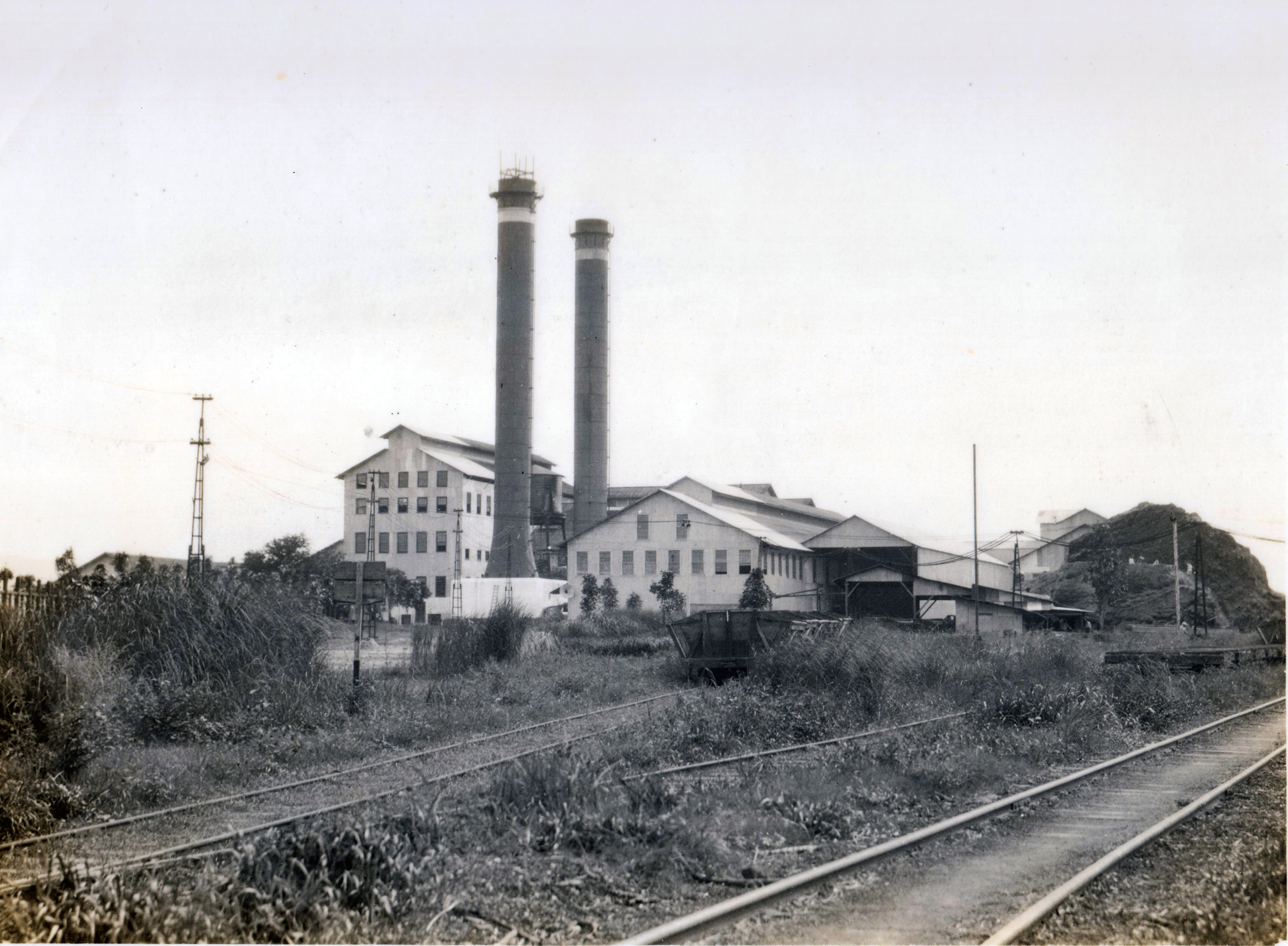
The Calamba Sugar Central sugar mill on Luzon in 1929

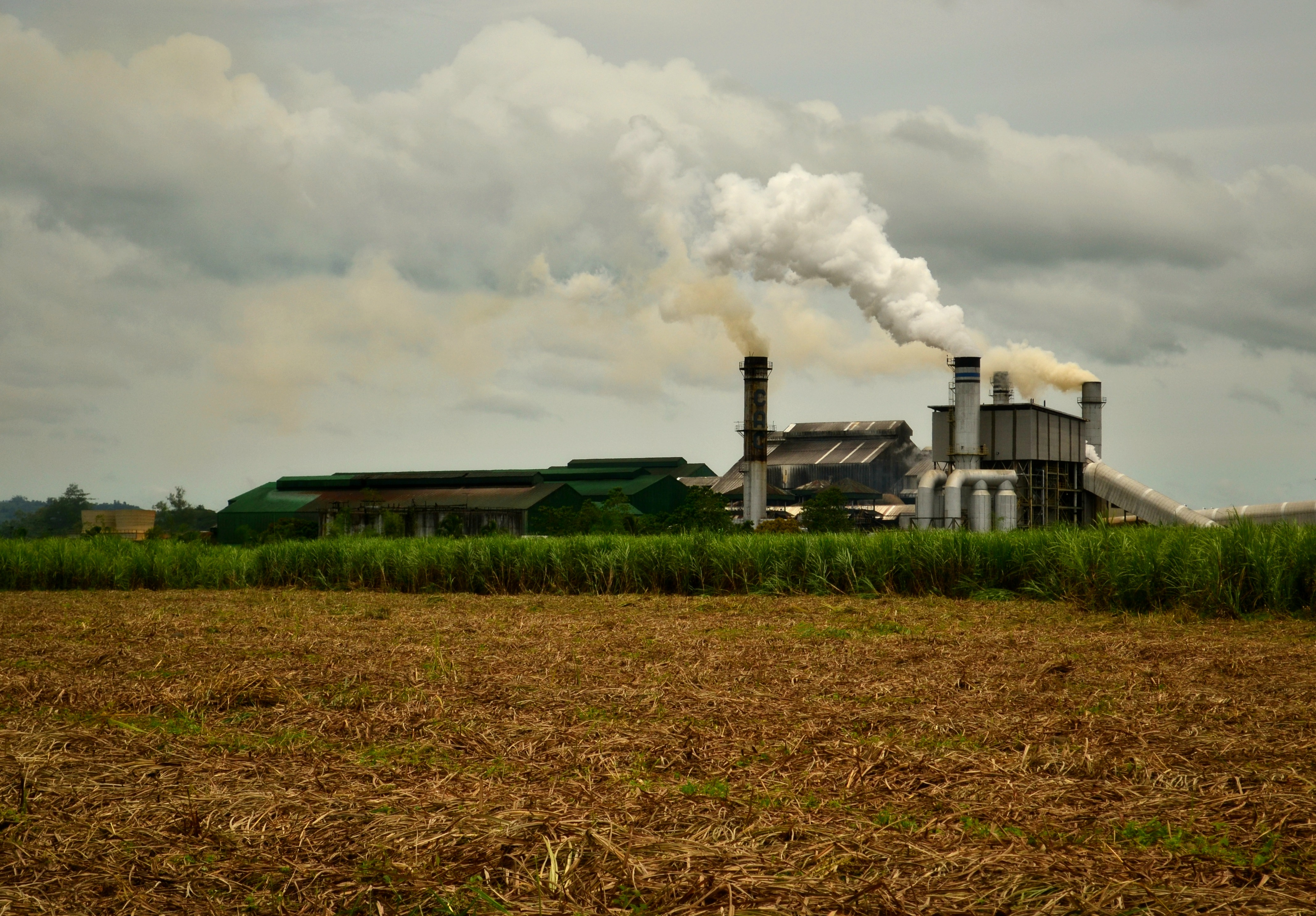
Central Aucarera de La Carlota (a sugar mill)

Sugar became the most important agricultural export of the Philippines between the late eighteenth century and the mid-1970s because of two main reasons: 1) foreign exchange earned and 2) it was the basis of wealth accumulation of some Filipino elite at that time. To ensure the continuous growth and development of sugar industry under the Philippine Commonwealth government, Philippine Sugar Administration (PSA) was established in 1937 to oversee the industry.

Roxas Holdings Incorporated on February 28, 2024, permanently closed its wholly owned subsidiary, the 97-year-old Central Azucarera Don Pedro in Nasugbu where Manny Pangilinan is vice-chairman. Founded in 1927, CADPI's "serious business losses" resulted in the termination of all its employees. In 2023, it shut down its milling operations and sold its sugarcane mill in Nasugbu, Batangas, to Universal Robina Corporation, which operates a sugar mill in nearby Balayan, Batangas.

After the Second World War the Sugar Quota Administration (SQA) replaced PSA in 1951 vis-à-vis with Philippine Sugar Institute (PHILSUGIN), a research agency. During the 1950s and 1960s, more than 20 percent of Philippine exports came from the sugar industry. It declined in the 1970s and plunged further in the first half of the 1980s to roughly 7 percent. It was during this period that the government acknowledged the existence of crisis in the industry. One of the factors that contributed to the worsening situation of the industry during that time was the depressed market for sugar.

In 1974, there was a dramatic escalation in the world price that peaked at around US$0.67 per pound of sugar. In succeeding two consecutive years, world prices of sugar fell to less than US$0.10, the price remained low until it rose before the decade ended. During the early 1980s, world sugar prices fell again, with US$0.03 per pound as the bottom. Prices recovered to US$0.14 per pound then fell again to between $0.08 and 0.09 per pound at the beginning of the early 1990s.

=== Free trade with the United States and the quota system ===
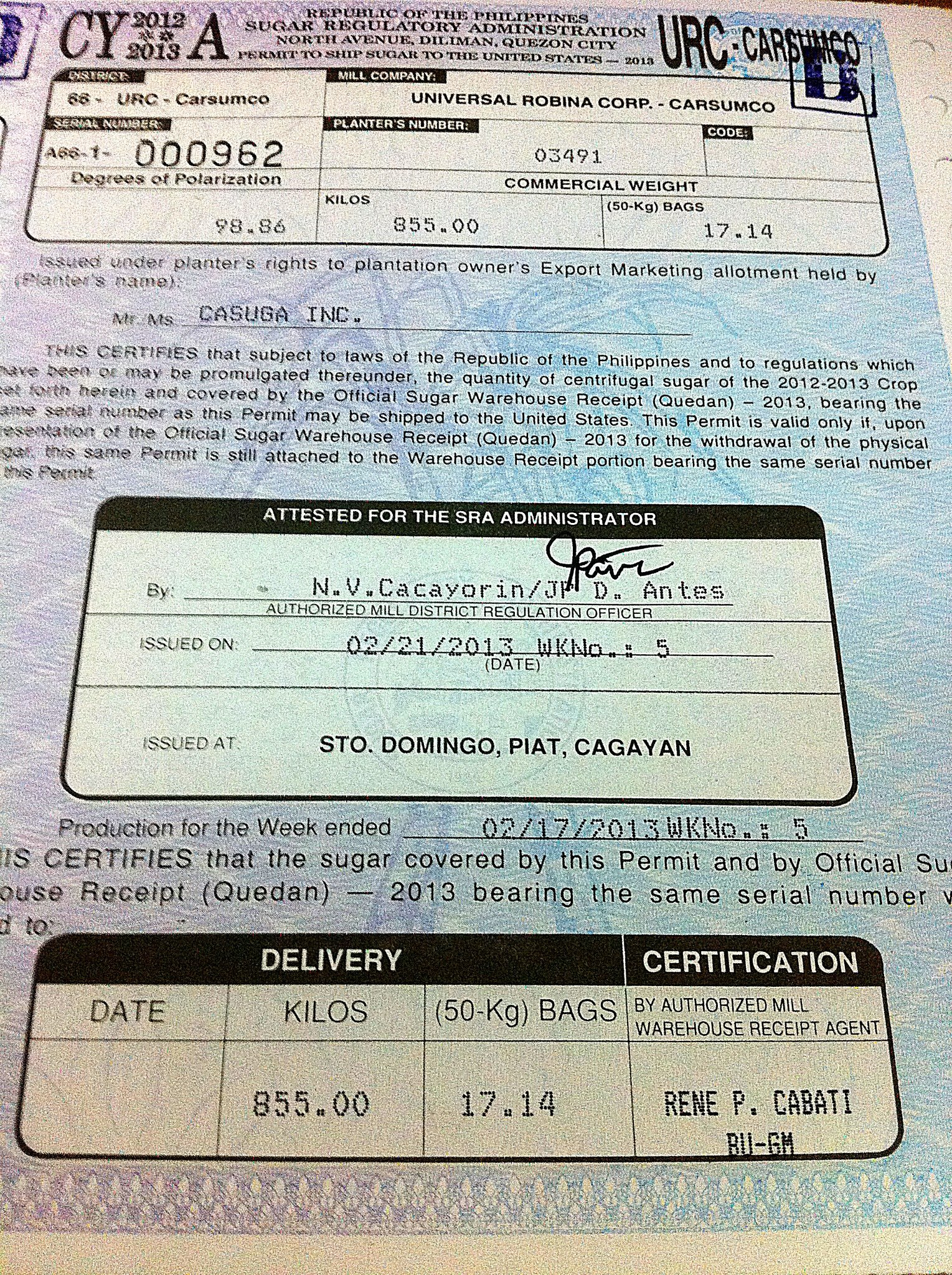
A sugar quedan in the Philippines

The transfer of Philippines as a colony from the Spanish to the Americans was not easy due to strong resistance from Filipino leader Emilio Aguinaldo. Soon after the fall of Aguinaldo in Palanan, Isabela, the Philippines was completely under the American rule. The Americans, unlike their predecessors, provided partial liberty to the Filipinos by preparing the latter to achieve independence and run its own government through a Commonwealth form of state.

The initial resistance turned into market cooperation that emanated from trust and good will of Filipino people towards the American colonizers and vice versa. United States' colonization of the Philippines protected the country from vicissitudes of world sugar prices due to its free access to a protected and subsidized American market, which started in 1913, when the United States established free trade with its Philippine colony.

The United States treated the Philippines like one of its American states that resulted to state protection of the Philippine sugar market. Twenty-one years later in 1934, the United States enacted a quota system on sugar that remained enforced until early 1970s. In 1965, U.S. Sugar Act was amended to provide the following terms in Quota system:

- A basic quota of 1,050,000 short tons plus 10.86% of any U.S. consumption increase from 9.7 million to 10.4 million tons or a total basic quota of 1,126,000 short tons for the Philippines;
- 47.22% of the deficits of U.S. domestic producers and other foreign country suppliers which conservatively is estimated to be about 200,000 tons, shall be allotted to the Philippines;
- The encouragement, if not a requirement that the Philippines maintain in reserve the equivalent of 15% of her U.S. quotas or roughly 180,000 tons;
- The premium recapture fee and a quarterly system of allocation during the first semester of each calendar year.

Despite restrictions on sugar trading, exports of Philippine sugar to the U.S. remained in a relatively privileged position especially during the 1970s. Philippine quotas for the United States ranged between 25 and 30 percent, a rate that is higher than other sugar suppliers like the Dominican Republic, Mexico and Brazil.

=== Early decline ===
Philippines exported sugar on the world market, generally to unrestricted locations, after U.S. quota law on sugar reached its expiration in 1974. Consequently, sugar shipments to the United States declined during this period. A quota system for the sugar importation was renewed by the United States on May 5, 1982. However, sugar allocations were based on a country's share in sugar trade with the United States in 1975 to 1981, the periods when exports of Philippine sugar to United States decreased; during this period, allocations of Philippine sugar was only 13.5 percent about half compared to its allocations in the early 1970s.

Efforts to raise allocations to 25 percent failed. The imposition of new quota system for sugar compounded by remarkable drop of 40 percent in total American imports of sugar in the mid-1980s resulted to huge loss of sales to the Philippines. The negative effect was greatly felt on the island of Negros, where the sugar industry employed 25 percent of local farm workers.

=== Government monopolization (1970s) ===
In the 1970s, President Ferdinand Marcos and his economic advisers argued that pervasive market failures were the root cause of the decline of the sugar industry. To rescue the industry, central coordination was crucial. The Marcos administration followed a diffusionist argument, calling for government to replace the market to stimulate the market development of the sugar industry

In 1976, in response to precipitous declines in sugar prices, President Marcos issued Presidential Decree No. 3888 (and amended by Presidential Decree Nos. 775 and 1192), ordering the establishment of the Philippine Sugar Commission (PHILSUCOM). This commission assumed the functions of both SQA and PHILSUGIN, and was given the sole power to buy and sell sugar, set prices paid to planters and millers, and purchase companies connected to the sugar industry. In May 1978, the Republic Planters Bank was established to provide adequate and timely financing to the sugar industry.

To minimize the impact of fluctuating world sugar prices during this period, PHILSUCOM established a protective pricing policy, entering into four-year term contracts. These contracts assured that 50 percent of exported sugar would be sold at an average price of 23.5 U.S. cents per pound, an amount lesser than the prevailing world rate of 30 U.S. cents per pound. This was followed by the government's monopolization of the sugar industry.

Contrary to projections, government substitution in the market did not improve the industry. PHILSUCOM and its trading subsidiary, the National Sugar Trading Corporation (NASUTRA), were tainted with controversies. According to the findings of a study conducted by a group of economists at the University of the Philippines (U.P.), sugar producers' losses reached an estimated value between 11 and 14 billion Philippine pesos during the period between 1974 and 1983.

==== Negros famine ====
The Negros famine took place on Negros island in the Philippines in the mid-1980s, during the waning days of the Marcos dictatorship. It was a key moment in the history of sugar production in the Philippines, as well as the broader political history of the Philippines. Caused by the Marcos administration's efforts to control sugar production through the NASUTRA monopoly held by Marcos crony Roberto Benedicto and by a sudden crash in international sugar prices, it created what popularly came to be known as a "social volcano", with tensions culminating in the Escalante massacre, and with negative effects still felt even after the ouster of Ferdinand Marcos and his cronies during the 1986 People Power Revolution.

In 1984, over 190,000 sugar workers lost their livelihood, and about a million sacadas and their families in Negros suffered in the famine. By 1985, a survey by the National Nutrition Council of the Philippines estimated that about 350,000 children – 40 percent of Negros Occidental residents under the age of 14 – were suffering from malnutrition. The 1985 infant death statistics at Bacolod City Hospital rose 67 percent, and Negros' infant mortality rose to nearly double the national average, with most of the deaths attributed to malnutrition.

=== Establishment of Sugar Regulatory Administration (SRA) ===
After the 1986 Revolution, which ousted Marcos, President Corazon Aquino immediately appointed Fred J. Elizalde as officer-in-charge of the institutions that will regulate the sugar industry since the administration that time was technically in revolutionary form of government. On May 28, 1986, Executive Order No. 18 established the current Sugar Regulatory Administration (SRA). The SRA was mandated to carry out the following functions: to institute an orderly system in sugarcane production for the stable, sufficient and balanced production of sugar; to establish and maintain a balanced relation between production and requirement of sugar, and marketing conditions as will stabilize prices; to promote the effective merchandising of sugar and its products; to undertake studies to the formulate policies.

== Sugar industry and the Philippine economy ==
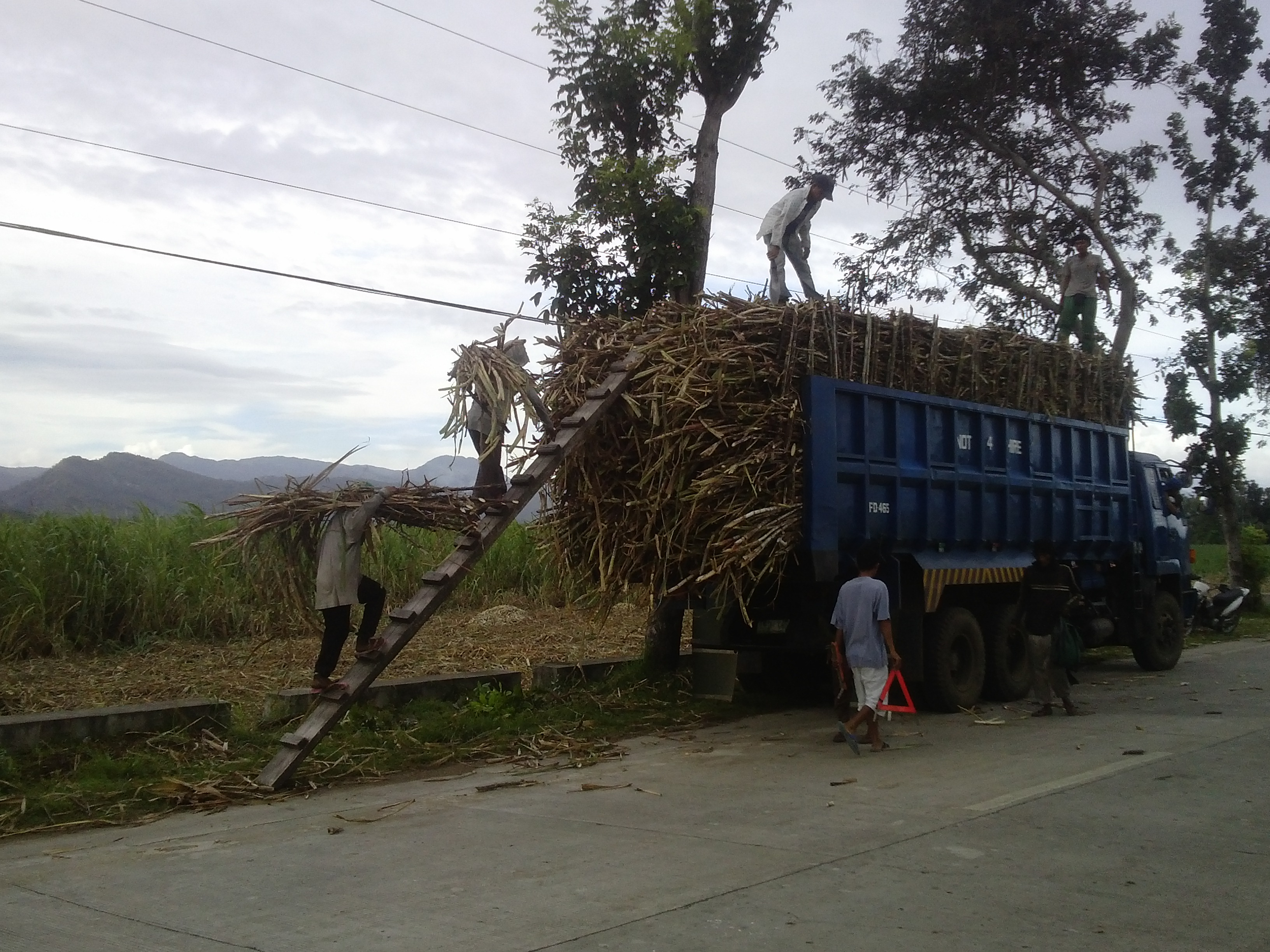
Loading sugar cane in Bais

Annual production of sugar contributes about 69.7 billion pesos to the national GDP, with value added tax (VAT) on the sale of refined sugar reaching over 1.92 billion pesos yearly. Sugar is primarily produced in Visayas (most especially in Negros Island Region), as well as in Central Luzon, and some parts of Mindanao. As of crop year 2007–08, Negros Occidental accounted for 54% of sugar produced, with it producing 18 billion pesos of the province's GDP.

It is estimated that as of 2012, the industry provides direct employment to 700,000 sugarcane workers spread across 19 sugar producing provinces.

In 1998 alone, investments to sugar industry have amounted to 20 billion pesos, according to the Board of Investments. These investments are private sector secured, sourced and funded, without cost or security from government.

Sugar industry has a social component, benefiting sugarcane workers. Through the Social Amelioration Fund (SAF), a lien is imposed on the volume of sugar produced. This fund is shouldered by sugar planters and millers and collected by the Bureau of Rural Workers. The benefits for the sugarcane workers under the lien include cash bonus, death benefit, maternity benefit, educational grant, and livelihood projects.

The sugar industry funds its own research, development and extension programs through the Philippine Sugar Research Institute Foundation Inc. (PHILSURIN) with aim to develop high yielding cane varieties. The Philippine government, through SRA, provides the extension efforts in partnerships with the Mill District Development Councils (MDDC). PHILSURIN assists this initiative through the hiring of Mill District Coordinators and financial support to many programs of the MDDC.

The sugar industry is in alternative energy sources which include biofuel through bioethanol production and co-generation activities.

== Sugar Importation ==
From crop years 2002–2003 to 2008–2009, the Philippines consistently met its domestic sugar needs and produced surplus for export. However, in crop year 2009–2010, the country imported 250,000 metric tons of refined sugar (equivalent to 270,000 MT of raw sugar) to bolster reserves for the upcoming low supply period. Of this, 165,000 metric tons (178,200 MT of raw sugar) arrived on August 31, 2010, and 85,000 metric tons (91,800 MT of raw sugar) arrived between September and October 2010. Additionally, food exporters and processors with Customs Bonded Warehouses (CBW) could import sugar tariff-free for products sold overseas, as permitted by the Tariff and Customs Code of the Philippines (TCCP). In 2010–2011, the Philippines again had a sugar surplus, but significant amounts of sugar premixes for industrial use were imported. The Sugar Regulatory Administration recorded 49,945 metric tons of sugar premixes imported under AHTN 1701 in 2010–2011, up from 11,660 metric tons in 2009–2010. Imports of sugar premixes decreased to 10,160 metric tons in 2011–2012, and in 2013, 6,627 metric tons were imported under AHTN 1701, with none in 2014.

On July 31, 2022, the Philippines produced 1,792,102 metric tons of raw sugar and 737,254 metric tons of refined sugar, marking decreases of 16.18% and 2.84%, respectively, compared to the previous year. The projected raw sugar production for the crop year 2021–2022 was 1.80 million metric tons, a 16% drop from the previous year's 2,143,018 metric tons. The country produced less sugar in 2022 than in 2021 and was expected to produce even less in 2021–2022. Despite importing sugar to boost reserves, the Philippines still faced a deficit in both raw and refined sugar. This shortage led to higher retail prices in Metro Manila. The Sugar Regulatory Administration (SRA) attempted to address the issue with Sugar Order No. 3 in 2021–2022, but it faced legal challenges from local sugar producers. By August 31, 2022, the SRA estimated a negative balance of 35,231 metric tons for raw sugar and a refined sugar balance of 129,250 metric tons, all of which was already allocated to industrial users, resulting in a deficit of 20,748.65 metric tons of domestic refined sugar. This was significantly lower than the previous year's balances of 228,690 metric tons for raw sugar and 195,000 metric tons for refined sugar.

== Sub-sectors ==
The sugar industry has two major sub-sectors: the farming sub-sector and the milling sub-sector.

=== Farming sub-sector ===
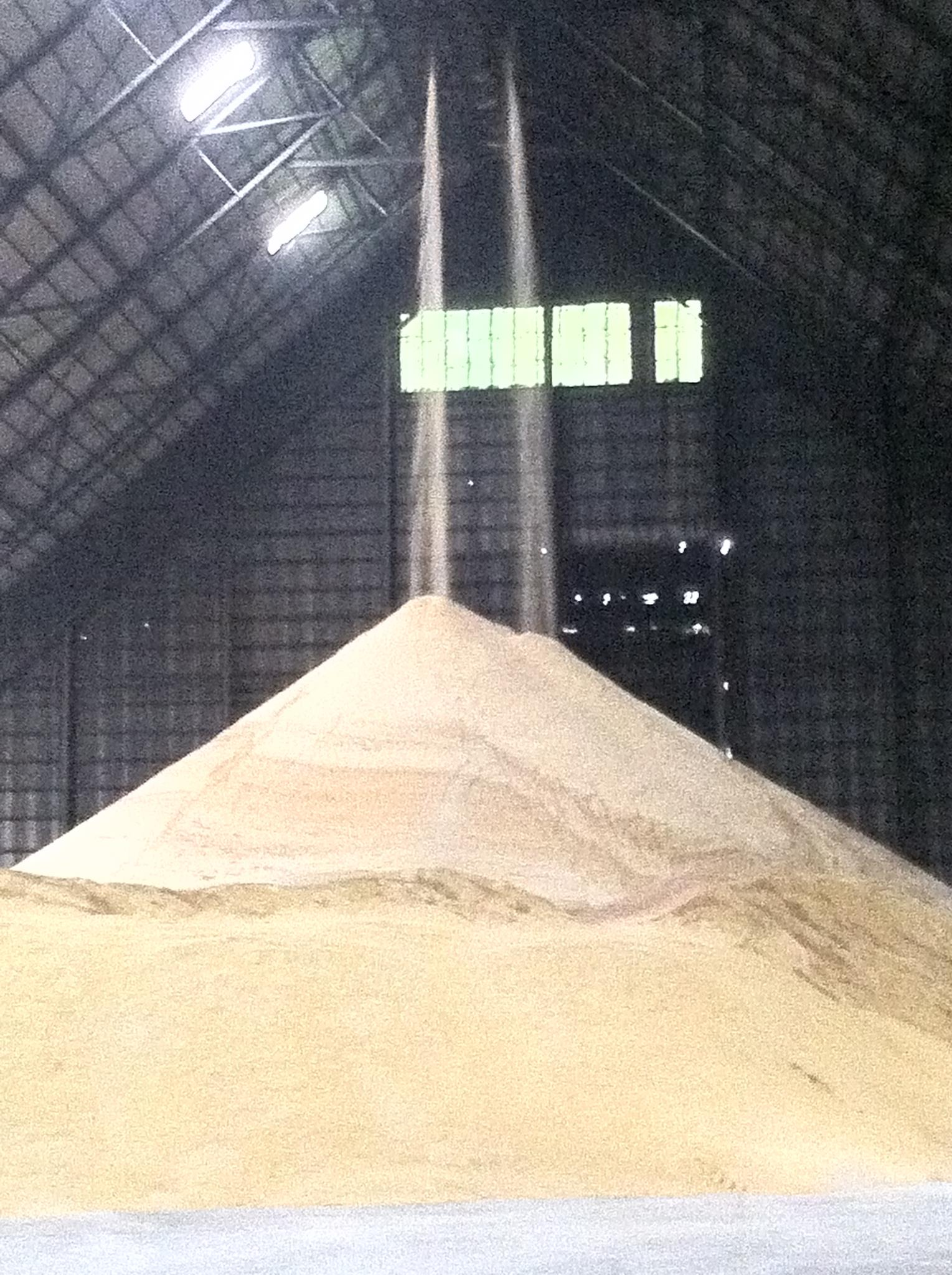
Sugar production in the Philippines

At least 19 provinces within the 11 regions produce sugarcane in the nation. A range from 360,000 to 390,000 hectares are devoted to sugarcane production. The largest sugarcane areas are found in the Negros Island Region, which accounts for 51% of sugarcane areas planted. This is followed by Mindanao which accounts for 20%; Luzon by 17%; Panay by 7%; and Eastern Visayas by 4%. It is estimated that as of 2012, the industry provides direct employment to 700,000 sugarcane workers spread across 19 sugar-producing provinces.

=== Milling sub-sector ===
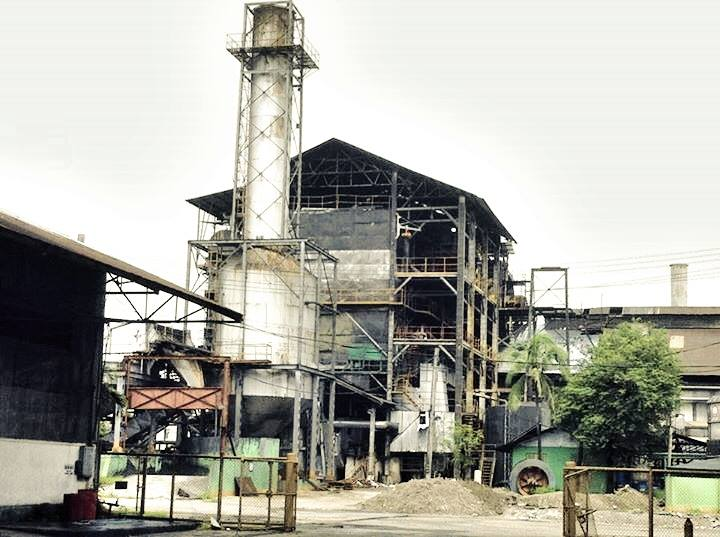
Central Azucarera de Tarlac

As of 2024, 25 mills are operational. Of 25 sugar mills, 11 have their own sugar refineries. Among the major island groups, Visayas has the greatest number of operational mills with 17, 13 of which are from Negros Island alone.

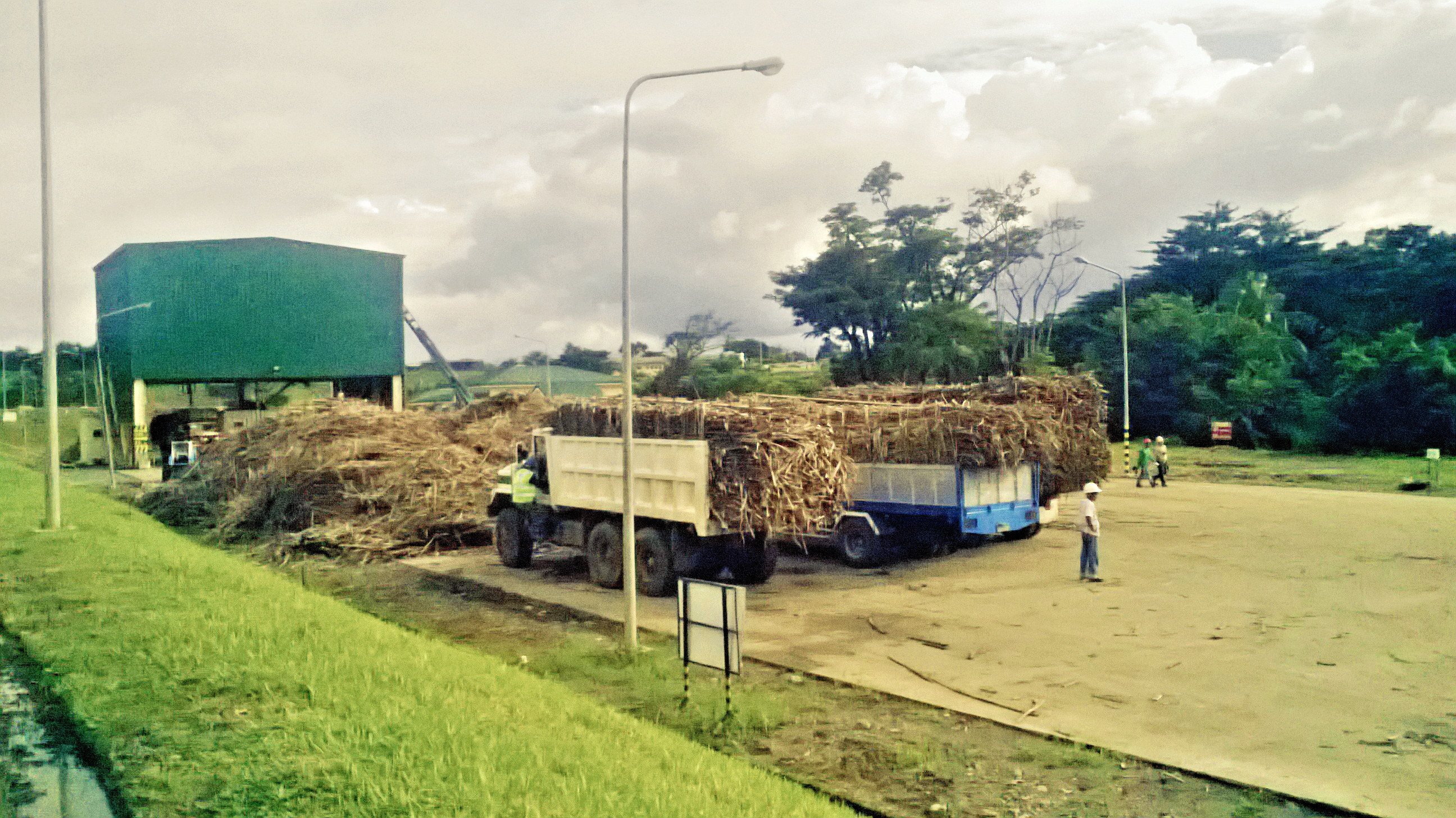
Trucks delivery of sugarcane

==== Luzon (4 mills) ====
- Cagayan Robina Sugar Milling Corporation or URC-CARSUMCO (Piat, Cagayan) – with own sugar refinery
- Central Azucarera de Tarlac (Tarlac) – with own sugar refinery
- Balayan Sugar Central Incorporated (Balayan, Batangas)
- Peñafrancia Sugar Mill (Peñafrancia, Camarines Sur)

==== Visayas (17 mills) ====
===== Negros (13 mills) =====
- Universal Robina Corporation – Bais (Bais)
- Central Azucarera de Bais (Bais)
- Binalbagan-Isabela Sugar Company – with own sugar refinery (Binalbagan)
- First Farmers Holding Corporation (Talisay) – with own sugar refinery
- Hawaiian-Philippine Company (Silay)
- Universal Robina Corporation – La Carlota (La Carlota)
- Lopez Sugar Corporation (Sagay) – with own sugar refinery
- HDJ Bayawan Agri-Venture Corporation (Bayawan City)
- HDJ Bayawan Agri-Venture Corporation (HDJ-Tolong, Sta. Catalina, Negros Oriental)
- Sagay Central (Sagay)
- Universal Robina Corporation – Sonedco (Kabankalan) – with own sugar refinery
- Universal Robina Corporation – Ursumco (Manjuyod) – with own sugar refinery
- Victorias Milling Company (Victorias) – with own sugar refinery

===== Panay (3 mills) =====
- URC Passi (Iloilo)
- Central Azucarera de San Antonio (Passi City, Iloilo)
- Capiz Sugar Central, Inc. (President Roxas, Capiz)

===== Eastern Visayas (1 mill) =====
- Hideco Sugar Milling Company (Kananga, Leyte) – with own sugar refinery

==== Mindanao (4 mills) ====
- Bukidnon Sugar Company (Quezon, Bukidnon) – with own sugar refinery
- Crystal (Maramag, Bukidnon)
- Davao Sugar Central Company (Hagonoy, Davao del Sur) – with own sugar refinery
- Cotabato Sugar Central Company (Matalam, North Cotabato)

==== Suspended Operations ====
- Bogo-Medellin Milling Company (Cebu)

==== Defunct ====
- Aidsisa (Silay)
- Dacongcogon (Kabankalan)
- Durano Sugar Milling Company (Danao, Cebu)
- Sweet Crystals Integrated Sugar Mills (Porac, Pampanga)
- Central Azucarera de Don Pedro (Nasugbu, Batangas)

== See also ==
- Agriculture in the Philippines
- Land reform in the Philippines
- Sugar Alliance of the Philippines
- Sugar Regulatory Administration
