= DWCT =

DWCT may refer to:

- DWCT-FM, the former callsign of DWJM (88.3 MHz) in Metro Manila
- DWCT-AM, a radio station (1557 kHz) in Legazpi
- Holy Name University, a Catholic university, high school and elementary school located in Tagbilaran, Bohol, Philippines; initialism from former name Divine Word College of Tagbilaran
