= DWNF =

Radio station in Camarines Norte, Philippines

Radyo Katabang (DWNF)
- Vinzons; Philippines
- Broadcast area: Vinzons and surrounding areas
- Frequency: 107.7 MHz
- Branding: Radyo Katabang 107.7 FM

Programming
- Language: Filipino
- Format: Silent
- Network: Nutriskwela Community Radio

Ownership
- Owner: National Nutrition Council

History
- First air date: October 11, 2017
- Last air date: November 11, 2026
- Call sign meaning: Nutriskwela Foundation

Technical information
- Licensing authority: NTC
- Power: 300 watts

Links
- Webcast: https://streema.com/radios/DWNF
- Website: Website

DWNF (107.7 FM), broadcasting as 107.7 Radyo Katabang, is a radio station owned and operated by the National Nutrition Council and LGU Vinzons under the Nutriskwela Community Radio Network. Its studios and transmitter are located at the second floor of Vinzons Public Market. Katabang means ally or helper in Bicol.

== History ==
DWNF was established on October 11, 2017, by the National Nutrition Council in partnership with the Local Government Unit of Vinzons. It was set up under Phase V of the Nutriskwela Community Radio Network Program to address localized health, development, and nutrition awareness throughout the municipality.

The station operates daily from 4:00am to 10:00pm with a 300-watt transmitter located at the second floor of Vinzons Public Market and relies on a local team of community volunteers for its daily programming. In 2019, the station won a national Nutriskwela award for Best Special Coverage of a Community Event for its broadcasting of the 108th Vinzons Birthday Street Dancing Competition.
