= DZNJ =

Radio station in Catanduanes, Philippines

Radyo Kaamigo (DZNJ)
- Panganiban; Philippines
- Broadcast area: Eastern Catanduanes
- Frequency: 98.9 MHz
- Branding: 98.9 Radyo Kaamigo

Programming
- Languages: Bicolano, Filipino
- Format: Community radio
- Network: Nutriskwela Community Radio

Ownership
- Owner: National Nutrition Council

History
- First air date: April 5, 2013

Technical information
- Licensing authority: NTC
- Power: 600 watts

DZNJ (98.9 FM), broadcasting as 98.9 Radyo Kaamigo, is a radio station owned and operated by the National Nutrition Council under the Nutriskwela Community Radio Network. Its studio and transmitter are located at the Administration Bldg., Catanduanes State University-Panganiban Campus, Brgy. Sta. Ana, Panganiban, Catanduanes. "Kaamigo" stands for friend in Bicolano.
