= DXNR =

Philippine radio station

Radyo Katribu (DXNR)
- T'Boli; Philippines
- Broadcast area: T'Boli and surrounding areas
- Frequency: 103.3 MHz
- Branding: 103.3 Radyo Katribu

Programming
- Languages: T'Boli, Hiligaynon, Filipino
- Format: Community radio
- Network: Nutriskwela Community Radio

Ownership
- Owner: National Nutrition Council

History
- First air date: April 15, 2015
- Call sign meaning: Nutriskwela Radio

Technical information
- Licensing authority: NTC
- Power: 300 watts
- ERP: 600 watts

DXNR (103.3 FM), broadcasting as 103.3 Radyo Katribu, is a radio station owned and operated by the National Nutrition Council under the Nutriskwela Community Radio Network, in partnership with Municipal Government of T'boli. Its studios and transmitter are located at the Municipal Information Office, LGU Complex, Poblacion, T'Boli, South Cotabato. "Katribu" stands for Community in T'Boli.
