= DXNO =

Radyo Komunidad (DXNO)
- Isabela; Philippines
- Broadcast area: Basilan
- Frequency: 97.5 MHz
- Branding: Radyo Komunidad

Programming
- Languages: Chavacano, Filipino
- Format: Community radio
- Network: Nutriskwela Community Radio

Ownership
- Owner: National Nutrition Council

History
- First air date: April 25, 2011
- Call sign meaning: Nutriskwela Radio

Technical information
- Licensing authority: NTC
- Power: 1,000 watts

Links
- Website: Website

DXNO (97.5 FM), broadcasting as 97.5 Radyo Komunidad, is a radio station owned and operated by the National Nutrition Council under the Nutriskwela Community Radio Network. Its studios and transmitter are located at the 3rd Floor, Tan Bldg., Valderosa St., Isabela, Basilan.
