= DZNA =

Radio station in Occidental Mindoro, Philippines

Radyo Kabinnulig (DZNA)
- Lagangilang; Philippines
- Broadcast area: Lagangilang and surrounding areas
- Frequency: 99.9 MHz
- Branding: 99.9 Radyo Kabinnulig

Programming
- Languages: Ilocano, Filipino
- Format: Community Radio
- Network: Nutriskwela Community Radio

Ownership
- Owner: National Nutrition Council

History
- First air date: September 18, 2013
- Call sign meaning: Nutriskwela

Technical information
- Licensing authority: NTC
- Power: 200 watts
- ERP: 500 watts

DZNA (99.9 FM), broadcasting as 99.9 Radyo Kabinnulig, is a radio station owned and operated by the National Nutrition Council under the Nutriskwela Community Radio Network. Its studios and transmitter are located inside the University of Abra campus, Lagangilang. "Kabinnulig" stands for friend in Ilocano.
