= DXJV =

DXRL
Molave; Philippines
- Broadcast area: Zamboanga del Sur
- Frequency: 102.1 MHz
- Branding: DXRL 102.1

Programming
- Languages: Filipino, Cebuano
- Format: Contemporary MOR, OPM

Ownership
- Owner: Capitol Broadcasting Center

History
- First air date: October 10, 2016; 9 years ago

Technical information
- Licensing authority: NTC
- Power: 5 kW

DXRL (102.1 FM) is a radio station owned and operated by Capitol Broadcasting Center. Its studios and transmitter are located at Brgy. Maloloy-on, Molave, Zamboanga del Sur Province.
