= DYNN =

Radio station in Northern Samar, Philippines

Radyo Kasugbong (DYNN)
- Catubig; Philippines
- Broadcast area: Northern Samar
- Frequency: 97.3 MHz
- Branding: 97.3 Radyo Kasugbong

Programming
- Languages: Waray, Filipino
- Format: Community Radio
- Network: Nutriskwela Community Radio

Ownership
- Owner: National Nutrition Council

History
- First air date: February 1, 2011
- Call sign meaning: National Nutrition Council

Technical information
- Licensing authority: NTC
- Power: 300 watts

DYNN (97.3 FM), broadcasting as 97.3 Radyo Kasugbong, is a radio station owned and operated by the National Nutrition Council under the Nutriskwela Community Radio network. The station's studio is located at the Catubig Municipal Building, Catubig. "Kasugbong" stands for friend in Waray.
