= DXHL =

Super Bagting (DXHL)
Maramag, Bukidnon; Philippines
- Broadcast area: Bukidnon
- Frequency: 101.3 MHz
- Branding: Super Bagting 101.3

Programming
- Languages: Cebuano, Filipino
- Format: Contemporary MOR, News, Talk

Ownership
- Owner: Capitol Broadcasting Center
- Operator: Pacific Press Media Production Corporation

History
- First air date: 2018

Technical information
- Licensing authority: NTC
- Power: 5 kW

Super Bagting 101.3 (DXHL 101.3 MHz) is an FM station owned by Capitol Broadcasting Center and operated by Pacific Press Media Production Corporation. Its studios and transmitter are located at The Margarette Business Hotel, Sayre Highway, Maramag, Bukidnon.
