= Nutriskwela Community Radio =

Philippine radio network

- Type: Radio network
- Country: Philippines
- Availability: Regional
- Broadcast area: Philippines
- Owner: National Nutrition Council
- Parent: Department of Health
- Launch date: 2008
- Official website: nnc.gov.ph

Nutriskwela Community Radio Network is a network of low-powered community radio stations around the Philippines. The network and its radio stations are owned by the National Nutrition Council (an attached agency of the Department of Health), in partnership with various local government units and educational institutions, and are licensed as non-commercial stations, with programming focused on infotainment, health and nutrition.

== Stations ==
Stations
Branding	Call sign	Frequency	Location
Radyo Kabinnulig (Note: 3rd Phase: Implemented in 2013.)	DZNA	99.9 MHz	Lagangilang, Abra
Radyo Kasaranay (Note: 4th Phase: Implemented in 2015.)	DZNQ	96.7 MHz	Luna, Apayao
Radyo Kiphodan (Note: 1st Phase: Implemented in 2008.)	DZNC	99.1 MHz	Lagawe, Ifugao
Radyo Kasalip	DZNR	96.7 MHz	Pasil, Kalinga
Radyo Kataguwan (Note: 5th Phase: Implemented in 2017.)	DWNM	97.3 MHz	Bauko, Mountain Province
Radyo Karruba	DWNI	91.1 MHz	Burgos, Ilocos Norte
Radyo Kailian (Note: 2nd Phase: Implemented in 2010.)	DZNF	97.3 MHz	Santa Maria, Ilocos Sur
Radyo Kabinnadang	DZNP	93.5 MHz	Cervantes, Ilocos Sur
Radyo Kayvayvanan	DZNB	97.5 MHz	Basco, Batanes
Radyo Kalugaran	DZND	97.7 MHz	Claveria, Cagayan
Radyo Kaedup	DWNK	102.9 MHz	Dingalan, Aurora
Radyo Kawadi (Note: 6th Phase: Implemented in 2019.)	DWNQ	100.7 MHz	Casiguran, Aurora
Radyo Kaisahan	DZNG	107.7 MHz	Sariaya, Quezon
Radyo Kamalindig	DZNS	94.1 MHz	Buenavista, Marinduque
Radyo Kapalayawan	DWNH	100.1 MHz	Paluan, Occidental Mindoro
Radyo Kaunlaran	DZNI	99.7 MHz	Bansud, Oriental Mindoro
Radyo Kasimanwa	DZNE	97.3 MHz	Coron, Palawan
Radyo Kaamigo	DZNJ	98.9 MHz	Panganiban, Catanduanes
Radyo Kabag-uhan	DZNT	99.1 MHz	Cataingan, Masbate
Radyo Kahamugaway	DWNZ	106.5 MHz	Cawayan, Masbate
Radyo Katunog	DWNS	94.5 MHz	Matnog, Sorsogon
Radyo Kaimaw	DYNC	88.5 MHz	Pandan, Antique
Radyo Kaabyanan	DYNB	88.5 MHz	Sibalom, Antique
Radyo Kaigsoonan	DYNO	98.5 MHz	Zamboanguita, Negros Oriental
Radyo Kahimsug	DYNE	97.5 MHz	Barili, Cebu
Radyo Kalampusan	DYNH	99.1 MHz	San Francisco, Cebu
Radyo Kauswagan	DYNF	91.3 MHz	Borongan, Eastern Samar
Radyo Kabulig	DYND	103.1 MHz	San Policarpo, Eastern Samar
Radyo Kasugbong	DYNN	97.3 MHz	Catubig, Northern Samar
Radyo Kausbawan	DYNG	103.1 MHz	Palompon, Leyte
Radyo Kahupayan	DXNK	96.9 MHz	Siayan, Zamboanga del Norte
Radyo Kaugmaran	DXNJ	104.5 MHz	Aurora, Zamboanga del Sur
Radyo Kasuhnan	DXNC	98.5 MHz	Siay, Zamboanga Sibugay
Radyo Kalilang	DXNN	104.9 MHz	Kalilangan, Bukidnon
Radyo Kalambuan	DXNE	94.3 MHz	Tubod, Lanao del Norte
Radyo Kahimunan	DXNB	101.3 MHz	Laak, Davao de Oro
Radyo Kalumonan	DXNQ	97.3 MHz	San Isidro, Davao Oriental
Radyo Kasadya	DXNF	99.9 MHz	President Roxas, Cotabato
Radyo Kasaganaan	DXNI	99.7 MHz	Maitum, Sarangani
Radyo Katribu	DXNR	103.3 MHz	T'Boli, South Cotabato
Radyo Kahiusa	DXNM	99.3 MHz	Tupi, South Cotabato
Radyo Kadulangan	DXAO	92.1 MHz	Kalamansig, Sultan Kudarat
Radyo Katilingban	DXNP	98.9 MHz	Tacurong, Sultan Kudarat
Radyo Kaagapay	DXCN	107.3 MHz	Sibagat, Agusan del Sur
Radyo Kabakhawan	DXNG	97.7 MHz	Del Carmen, Surigao del Norte
Radyo Komunidad	DXNO	97.5 MHz	Isabela, Basilan
Radyo Kasannangan	DXNH	94.1 MHz	Bongao, Tawi-Tawi

=== Defunct stations ===
Branding	Call sign	Frequency	Location
Radyo Kasanggayahan	DZNH	95.1 MHz	Sorsogon City
Radyo Katabang	DWNF	107.7 MHz	Vinzons, Camarines Norte
Radyo Kinaiyahan	DXNX	97.7 MHz	Malimono, Surigao del Norte
Radyo Kazalimbago	DXAU	90.1 MHz	Matanog, Maguindanao del Norte
