= DYNF =

Philippine radio station

Radyo Kauswagan (DYNF)
- Borongan; Philippines
- Broadcast area: Eastern Samar
- Frequency: 91.3 MHz
- Branding: 91.3 Radyo Kauswagan

Programming
- Languages: Waray, Filipino
- Format: Community Radio
- Network: Nutriskwela Community Radio

Ownership
- Owner: National Nutrition Council

History
- First air date: February 8, 2013
- Call sign meaning: Nutriskwela Foundation

Technical information
- Licensing authority: NTC
- Power: 300 watts

DYNF (91.3 FM), broadcasting as 91.3 Radyo Kauswagan, is a radio station owned and operated by the National Nutrition Council under the Nutriskwela Community Radio network. The station's studio is located at the 2nd floor, ICTC Building, ESSU Borongan Campus, Brgy. Maypangdan, Borongan. "Kauswagan" stands for Improvement in Visayan.
