= Sugar Regulatory Administration =

- Pangasiwaang Tagapamahala sa Asukal (Filipino)

Agency overview
- Formed: September 16, 1937 (as PSA); May 28, 1986 (current form)
- Type: Government Owned and Controlled Corporation (GOCC)
- Jurisdiction: National
- Headquarters: Sugar Center Bldg., North Avenue, Diliman, Quezon City, Metro Manila, Philippines
- Annual budget: ₱1,098,269,248 Php (2024)
- Minister responsible: DA Secretary Francisco P. Tiu Laurel, Jr.
- Agency executives: Pablo Luis S. Azcona, Administrator and Chief Executive Officer; Board Member and Millers' Representative Ma. Mitzi V. Mangwag, Board Member and Planters' Representative David Andrew L. Sanson
- Parent agency: Department of Agriculture
- Website: www.sra.gov.ph

The Sugar Regulatory Administration (SRA; Filipino: Pangasiwaang Tagapamahala sa Asukal; Hiligaynon: Administrasyon sa Regulasyon sang Kalamay) is a government-owned and controlled corporation attached to the Department of Agriculture of the Philippines that is responsible for promoting the growth and development of the sugar industry of the Philippines through greater participation of the private sector and to improve the working conditions of the sugarcane farmers and laborers.

== Legal Mandate ==
The Sugar Regulatory Administration (SRA) is a government-owned and controlled corporation (GOCC) created under Executive Order No. 18 on May 28, 1986. Its primary mandate is to promote the growth, development, and competitiveness of the Philippine sugar industry, improve working conditions for laborers, and stabilize sugar prices for both producers and consumers.

Core Legal Mandate and Functions under Executive Order No. 18:

- Industry Development: Promoting the development of the sugar industry through increased private sector participation.
- Supply & Price Regulation: Establishing a balanced relationship between sugar production and demand to ensure stable prices, profitable to producers and fair to consumers.
- Quality Control & Licensing: Issuing licenses, permits, and regulating the quedanning (warehousing), distribution, and marketing of sugar.
- Research & Promotion: Enhancing sugarcane research and maximizing the utilization of sugarcane resources.

== History ==
On September 16, 1937, the National Assembly authorized the Philippine Commonwealth president to create the Philippine Sugar Administration (PSA) by virtue of Executive Order No. 118.

=== Second World War ===
The sugar industry was heavily damaged during World War II, but reconstruction efforts commenced after the war. Of the 47 mills operating prior to the conflict, only 25 were successfully rebuilt.

=== Post-independence ===
After the Philippine independence in 1946, the office was renamed in 1951 the Sugar Quota Administration (SQA). The office undertook the allocation and administration of export, domestic reserve and world sugar quota, issuances of quedan permits, and verifying and recording transfers or assignments of allotments.

In order to improve productivity, the Philippine Sugar Institute (PHILSUGIN) was created on June 16, 1951, under Republic Act 632. The agency was tasked to conduct research work for the sugar industry in all its phases, agricultural and industrial.

Early in the 1960s, relationships between the United States and Cuba—one of the top sugar-producing countries of the world—became strained after the communist revolution in Cuba. This proved favorable for the Philippines and the other sugar-exporting countries as policies for expansion were issued to the mills and has opened greater areas for sugar cane planting.

=== Marcos regime ===
In 1977, the Philippine Sugar Commission (PHILSUCOM) was created by virtue of P.D. No. 388 to further bolster the revitalization of the sugar industry. It was amended by P.D. 775 and 1192. The decree integrated the functions of PHILSUGIN, SQA and PNB Philex.

The National Sugar Trading Corporation (NASUTRA), an affiliate of PHILSUCOM was then established for the purpose of reinvigorating the industry as a result of the slump brought about by the cancellation of US sugar quota system.

== Present period ==
After the People Power Revolution in 1986, new president Corazon Aquino through Executive Order 18 established the Sugar Regulatory Administration (SRA). Free enterprise trading of sugar is allowed to prevail, although the production of the same should be regulated and supported by an innovative research and development program and a socio-economic program which is primarily the private sector's responsibility. The SRA is mandated to promote the growth and development of the sugar industry through greater and significant participation of the private sector and to improve the working conditions of laborers. Thus, the agency concentrates its efforts on effectively discharging regulatory, R and D socio-economic activities such as the livelihood programs for the sugar workers.

The first sugar board was composed of Arsenio B. Yulo, Jr., as Chairman-Administrator and two Board Members Bibiano C. Sabino and Carlos Ledesma representing the planters and millers respectively.

== Offices ==
Sugar Regulatory Administration holds office at the Sugar Center, a facility built during the Marcos era, situated in a compound housing other agencies of the Department of Agriculture, located in North Avenue, Quezon City. It sits beside Veterans Memorial Medical Center compound. As part of decentralizing functions, the Sugar Regulatory Administration also holds office in the SRA Compound along Araneta Street, Bacolod City, the capital of sugar-rich Province of Negros Occidental. It has jurisdiction over sugar mills, traders, and other stakeholders in the Visayas region.

== See also ==
- Sugar industry of the Philippines
- Sugar Alliance of the Philippines
