= Mount Calavite =

Mountain in Mindoro, Philippines

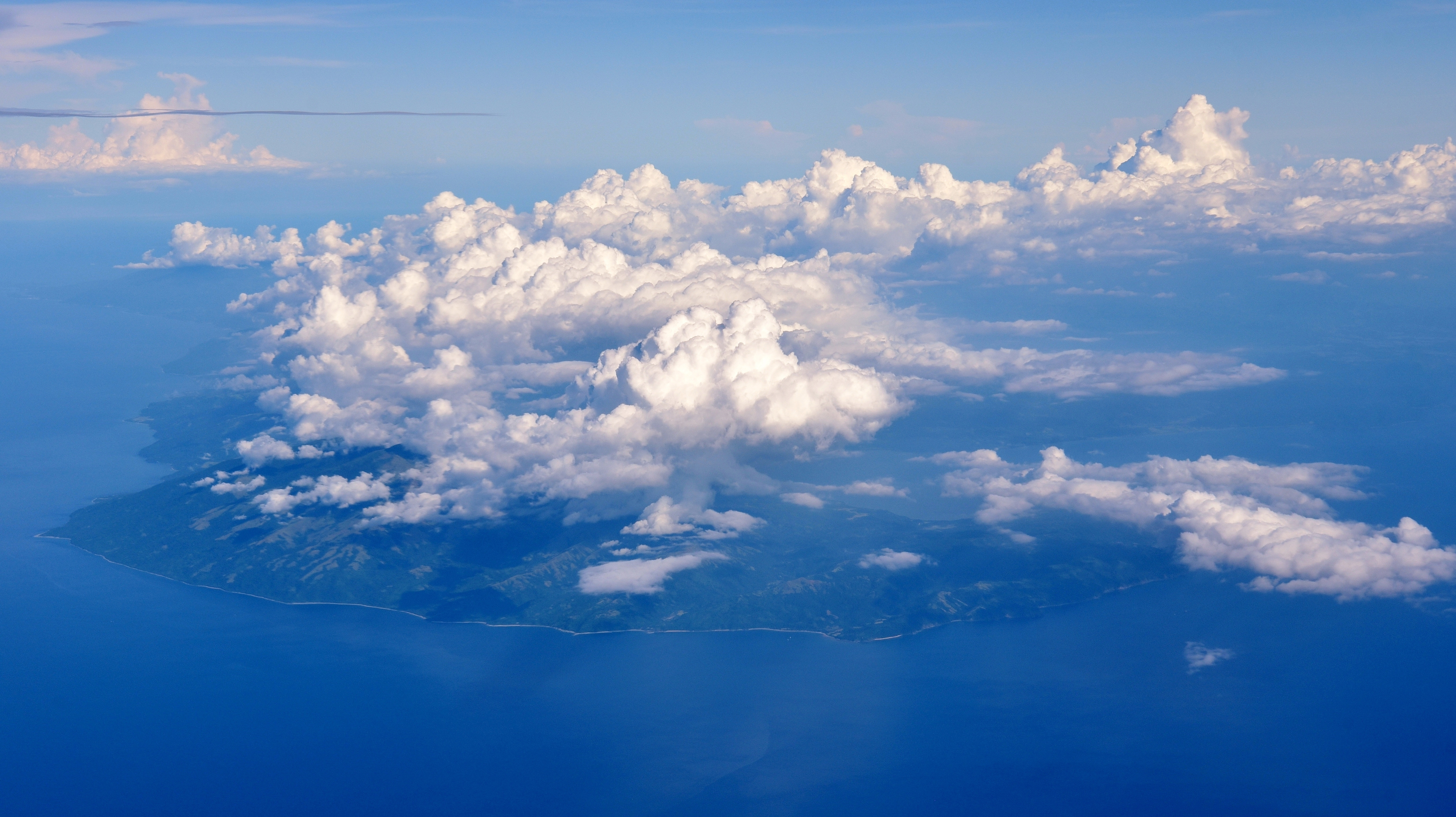
- Aerial view of the mountain

Highest point
- Elevation: 1,521 m (4,990 ft)
- Prominence: 1,462 m (4,797 ft)
- Listing: Mountains in the Philippines; Ribu
- Coordinates: 13°29′00″N 120°24′00″E

Geography
- Location within Luzon Location within Philippines
- Country: Philippines
- Province: Occidental Mindoro
- Region: Mimaropa
- City/municipality: Paluan

Climbing
- Easiest route: from Paluan, Occidental Mindoro

Mount Calavite is a peak located in the island of Mindoro in the Philippines. It measures 1,521 metres (4,990 ft) in elevation and is situated in its namesake headland, Cape Calavite, which forms the northwestern extremity of Mindoro. The mountain overlooks the municipality of Paluan in the south and the Lubang Island group in the Verde Island Passage in the north. It is one of only three areas in the island where Mindoro dwarf buffalos, commonly known as tamaraws, are found.

== Protected area ==
Mount Calavite is located in an 18,016.19-hectare (44,519.0-acre) protected area known as Mount Calavite Wildlife Sanctuary. It was first declared as a game refuge and bird sanctuary in 1920 to protect the natural habitat of the endemic Mindoro tamaraw. In 1925, the mountain and its adjacent area of FB Harrison village, Paluan was proclaimed a national park. The park's current designation as a wildlife sanctuary dates to 2000.

Other wildlife known to inhabit the park include endemic bird species such as the Mindoro bleeding-heart, Mindoro hornbill, spotted imperial pigeon and scarlet-collared flowerpecker.

== See also ==
- List of protected areas of the Philippines
