= DYVE =

Philippine radio station

RVFM (DYVE)
- Borongan; Philippines
- Broadcast area: Eastern Samar
- Frequency: 89.7 MHz
- Branding: 89.7 RVFM

Programming
- Languages: Waray, Filipino
- Format: Contemporary MOR, News, Talk

Ownership
- Owner: Wave Network

History
- First air date: 2012

Technical information
- Licensing authority: NTC
- Power: 1,000 watts

DYVE (89.7 FM), broadcasting as 89.7 RVFM, is a radio station owned and operated by Wave Network. The station's studio is located in Brgy. San Francisco, Borongan.
