= Negros famine =

1980s famine in Negros, Philippines

The Negros famine took place on Negros island in the Philippines in the mid-1980s, during the waning days of the Marcos dictatorship. It was a key moment in the history of sugar production in the Philippines, as well as the broader political history of the Philippines. Caused by the Marcos administration's efforts to control sugar production through the NASUTRA monopoly held by Marcos crony Roberto Benedicto and by a sudden crash in international sugar prices, it created what popularly came to be known as a "social volcano", with tensions culminating in the Escalante massacre, and with negative effects still felt even after the ouster of Ferdinand Marcos and his cronies during the 1986 People Power Revolution.

In 1984, over 190,000 sugar workers lost their livelihood, and about a million sacadas and their families in Negros suffered in the famine. By 1985, a survey by the National Nutrition Council of the Philippines estimated that about 350,000 children – 40 percent of Negros Occidental residents under the age of 14 – were suffering from malnutrition. The 1985 infant death statistics at Bacolod City Hospital rose 67 percent, and Negros' infant mortality rose to nearly double the national average, with most of the deaths attributed to malnutrition.

== Background ==
=== Sugar production in the Philippines ===
The cultivation of sugarcane, specifically Saccharum sinense, in the Philippines pre-dates Spanish colonization, being one of the original major crops of the Austronesian peoples, which includes Filipinos. It was traditionally used for making various native jaggery products (collectively called panutsa, like pakombuk, sangkaka and bagkat bao) used in cooking. It was also widely used to make traditional wines like palek, byais, basi, intus, and pangasi, and its juice was also used to create vinegar.

Sugarcane farming became an industry after 1856 when Russell & Sturgis first opened a branch in Iloilo for the purpose of giving crop loans to sugar planters. They offered liberal terms to a few Negrense planters, which encouraged some prominent Ilonggo sugarcane planters like the Ledesma, Lacson, Hilado, Cosculluela, Pérez, Alvarez, Sotamayor and Escanilla families moved to Negros in the mid-1800s. The sugar products were exported to the United States, England, Australia and Spain.

The industry continued to grow through the Philippines' colonial period and allowed a small group of Filipino families to accumulate wealth and status, and become part of the Philippines' social elite.

=== The Marcos dictatorship ===
In 1965, two decades after the end of the Second World War and the subsequent recognition of the Philippines' independence in 1946, Ferdinand Marcos became the Philippines tenth president. Relying on foreign debt to fund an ambitious slate of programs and projects, Marcos became popular enough to become the first Philippine post-war president to win a second term as president. This second term, however, was marked by social unrest when his debt-driven spending and budget made the Philippine economy vulnerable to dramatic downturns in the global economy. Before the end of his second and last allowed term under the Constitution of the Philippines, Marcos held on to power by declaring martial law in 1972, and replacing the Constitution with a new one in 1973. Although he formally lifted martial law almost a decade later in 1981, Marcos still hold on to his martial law powers, remaining a dictator until he was ousted by the 1986 People Power Revolution.

== The National Sugar Trading Corporation monopoly ==
By the time Ferdinand Marcos' second term began, sugar had become a critical Philippine export, responsible for 27% of the country's total dollar earnings. With international sugar prices rising rapidly through the early 1970s, Marcos decided to put domestic and international sugar trading under government control, first through the Philippine Exchange Co. (Philex), and later through the Philippine Sugar Commission (Philsucom) and its trading arm, the National Sugar Trading Corporation (NASUTRA) which were both controlled by Marcos crony Roberto Benedicto.

However, the international price of sugar eventually dropped in a market crash, dramatically hurting the livelihood of poor farmers.

== Onset of famine ==
The NASUTRA monopoly forced many sugar planters into bankruptcy or deep in debt. In 1984, over 190,000 sugar workers lost their livelihood, and about a million sacadas and their families in Negros suffered in what would later become known as the 1985 "Negros Famine."

One of the factors that worsened the situation for the people of Negros was the overreliance on sugar as virtually the island's only agricultural crop (monoculture), with the Journal of the Senate of the Philippines noting that: "practically the entire agricultural land of the province was devoted to sugarcane farms primarily in response to the lure of easy money and great profits from sugar which was then enjoying a privileged position in the world market."

By 1985, a survey by the National Nutrition Council of the Philippines estimated that about 350,000 children – 40 percent of Negros Occidental residents under the age of 14 – were suffering from malnutrition.

Author John Silva, who was working with Oxfam at the time, visited Negros and later described the living conditions of thousands of starving and malnourished children:

"I drove past the provincial hospital where I first saw hundreds of malnourished children on mats on the floors tended by their mothers, and later, we were in the country through cane fields and small towns remembering the skeletal children being weighed and assessed by our medical team.... There were over 100,000 children in various degree of malnutrition and we started a feeding program for 90,000 of them, hoping to save the worst cases."

1985 infant death statistics at Bacolod City Hospital rose 67 percent, and Negros' infant mortality rose to nearly double the national average, with most of the deaths attributed to malnutrition.

== Social impact ==
=== Escalante massacre ===
Locally, social tensions were so high that the Bishop of Bacolod, Antonio Fortich described the conditions on the island as a "social volcano" ready to explode. This was the situation on 20 September 1985, which marked the date of the Escalante massacre, in which paramilitary forces under the command of Marcos-allied Negros Occidental Governor Armando Gustilo gunned down farmers protesting social conditions on the 13th anniversary of the declaration of Martial Law. An estimated twenty or thirty farmers were killed, and thirty more were wounded.

=== Press coverage ===
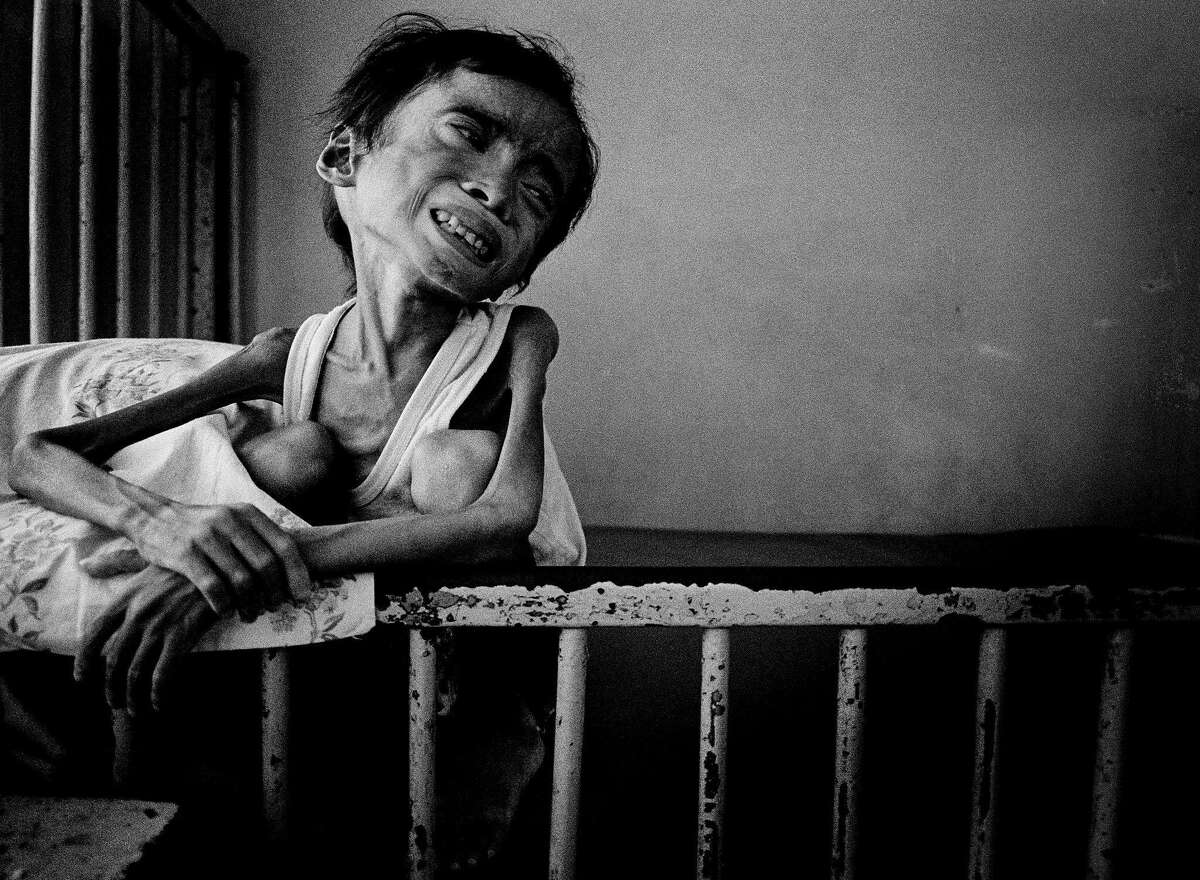
Kim Komenich's photo of Joel Abong

The Negros famine received a lot of media and institutional attention around the world. Among the most iconic images of the famine was Kim Komenich's photograph of a boy named Joel Abong, which was part of the coverage by journalist Inday Espina-Varona, who wrote about the last days of Abong's life, before he succumbed to pneumonia, tuberculosis, and malnutrition.

== Multisectoral response ==
=== International, church, and non-governmental support ===
Alerted about the crisis by shocking media coverage, a multisectoral effort was launched to mitigate the worst effects of the famine. International relief agencies, local non-governmental organizations, and the Catholic Church conducted feeding programs, mobilized relief drives, and otherwise pitched in to help.

=== People Power Revolution and reform through land distribution ===
The immediate impacts of the Negros famine were still being felt when Marcos was ousted by the People Power Revolution in 1986. Efforts to address hunger and malnutrition continued through the collaboration of the new Philippine government, the Catholic Church, and the international community.

In the long term, however, the administration of President Corazon Aquino sought to redistribute land through the new Comprehensive Agrarian Reform Law. It also put policies in place to diversify agricultural production on the island by polyculture. Under a "60-30-10 plan," 60% of Negros' agricultural lands would continue to be allocated to sugar, while 30% was allocated to other high-value export crops. The remaining 10% was earmarked for home gardens and contract growing.
