= Capitol Broadcasting Center =

Philippine media company

- Type: Private
- Industry: Broadcast
- Founded: June 15, 1968
- Headquarters: Pasig, Philippines
- Key people: Prospero Pichay (Chairman Emeritus); Luchie Cortez Pangilinan (President and CEO); Ed Sarto (Station Manager, ME RadioTV)
- Owner: Jose M. Luison and Sons, Inc.

Capitol Broadcasting Center is a Philippine radio network. Its corporate office is located at Unit 1802, 18/F, OMM-Citra Building, San Miguel Avenue, Ortigas Center, Pasig. CBC operates a number of stations across the country, mostly under the Radyo Uno and Like Radio brandings.

== CBC stations ==
=== AM stations ===
Branding	Callsign	Frequency	Location
ME Radio	DZME	1530 kHz	Metro Manila

=== FM stations ===
Like Radio

Branding	Callsign	Frequency	Location
Like Radio Dumaguete	DYFL	90.5 MHz	Dumaguete
Like Radio Guihulngan	DYJL	94.5 MHz	Guihulngan
Like Radio Bais	DYEL	104.7 MHz	Bais
Like Radio Maasin	DYAS	106.1 MHz	Maasin
Like Radio San Miguel	—N/a	107.1 MHz	San Miguel
Like Radio Catarman	DYJM	90.1 MHz	Catarman
Like Radio Sindangan	—N/a	102.5 MHz	Sindangan

Others

The following stations are operated by different entities.

Branding	Callsign	Frequency	Location	Operator
Amihan News	—N/a	102.1 MHz	San Carlos	—N/a
DXRL	DXJV	102.1 MHz	Molave	Rene Ledesma
Super Bagting	DXHL	101.3 MHz	Maramag	Pacific Press Media Production Corporation
XFM Bayugan	—N/a	95.7 MHz	Bayugan	Y2H Broadcasting Network, Inc.

=== Former stations ===
Callsign	Frequency	Location	Status
DWCT	1557 kHz	Legazpi	Transmitter was damaged by Typhoon Tisoy in 2019.
—N/a	99.3 MHz	Gingoog	Off the air. Frequency currently owned by Rizal Memorial Colleges Broadcasting Corporation.
—N/a	99.1 MHz	Tandag	Off the air.
—N/a	98.5 MHz	Bislig	Off the air.
