= DYJM =

Like Radio Catarman (DYJM)
Catarman; Philippines
- Broadcast area: Northern Samar
- Frequency: 90.1 MHz
- Branding: Like Radio 90.1

Programming
- Languages: Waray, Filipino
- Format: Contemporary MOR, OPM
- Network: Like Radio

Ownership
- Owner: Capitol Broadcasting Center

History
- First air date: 2016
- Call sign meaning: Jose M. Luison

Technical information
- Licensing authority: NTC
- Power: 5 kW

Links
- Website: likeradio917.webs.com

Like Radio 90.1 (DYJM 90.1 MHz) is an FM station owned and operated by Capitol Broadcasting Center. Its studios and transmitter are located along Calbayog-Catarman Rd., Catarman, Northern Samar.
