= DYAS =

Philippine radio station

Like Radio Maasin (DYAS)
Maasin; Philippines
- Broadcast area: Southern Leyte
- Frequency: 106.1 MHz
- Branding: Like Radio

Programming
- Languages: English, Filipino, Cebuano
- Format: CHR/Top 40, OPM
- Network: Like Radio

Ownership
- Owner: Capitol Broadcasting Center

History
- First air date: 2010 (as Viper FM); 2016 (as Like Radio)

Technical information
- Licensing authority: NTC
- Class: C, D, E
- Power: 5,000 watts
- ERP: 10,000 watts

DYAS (106.1 FM), broadcasting as 106.1 Like Radio, is a radio station owned and operated by Capitol Broadcasting Center in the Philippines. The station's studio is located at Brgy. Mambajao, Maasin, while its transmitter is located at Brgy. Ichon, Macrohon, Southern Leyte.
