= DYJC =

Lighthouse FM (DYJC)
Catarman; Philippines
- Broadcast area: Northern Samar
- Frequency: 104.5 MHz
- Branding: Lighthouse 104.5

Programming
- Languages: Waray, Filipino, English
- Format: Religious Radio

Ownership
- Owner: Sumoroy Broadcasting Corporation
- Operator: Lighthouse Baptist Church

History
- First air date: 1995 (as Power FM)
- Call sign meaning: Directing You to Jesus Christ

Technical information
- Licensing authority: NTC
- Power: 5,000 watts

DYJC (104.5 FM), broadcasting as Lighthouse 104.5, is a radio station owned by Sumoroy Broadcasting Corporation and operated by the Lighthouse Baptist Church. The station's studio is located along Quirino St., Brgy. Geratag, Catarman, Northern Samar.
