= Monopolies in the Philippines (1965–1986) =

Monopolies and corruption under Ferdinand Marcos

During the administration of former Philippine president Ferdinand Marcos (1965–1986) select businesses were favored and patronized by Marcos, receiving financial support, sole patronage, tax exemptions, and control over entire industries rendering these businesses as monopolies. Friends and relatives of Marcos acquired staggering wealth and economic power due to special favors and privileges extended by the administration. While Marcos associates enjoyed government bailout even during the decline of their firms, other businesses suffered high taxes, sanctions, and other unjust treatments that forced them to close up, or to sell their shares. The majority of monopolies linked to Ferdinand Marcos are managed by his close associates, also regarded as cronies by critics. Former First Lady Imelda Marcos insinuated that the Marcoses controlled the majority of the industries in the Philippines. In a 1988 interview, she stated, "We practically own everything in the Philippines—from electricity, telecommunications, airline, banking, beer and tobacco, newspaper publishing, television stations, shipping, oil and mining, hotels and beach resorts, down to coconut milling, small farms, real estate and insurance."

== Sugar industry ==
Sugar is an important industry in the Philippines, being one of the major crop exports since the Spanish colonial era. During the early years of the Marcos administration it was responsible for 27% of the country's total dollar earnings. Roberto Benedicto, Marcos' fraternity brother and associate, monopolized the Philippine sugar industry beginning in 1974, earning the name "Sugar King".

The international price of sugar steadily rose in the 1970s, which led to indiscriminate hoarding from the local market. Sugar traders preferred to sell sugar overseas rather than locally, where prices were regulated by the government. The Marcos administration created the Philippine Exchange Co. (Philex), a government entity that takes charge of all international trading of sugar. Philex solely took charge of exporting US and foreign-bound sugar. They bought locally manufactured sugar at a low price of $19.75 per picul, then sold it to the United States for $69.25. Their initial profits amounted to $700 million. Hacienderos (agricultural land owners) argued that Philex was nothing more than a trading agent and demanded that profits from international sales should be given to them. However, before the issue could be properly addressed, the international price of sugar crashed, and Philex went bankrupt. The crash surprised the Marcos government, who had been storing hoards and hoards of sugar in warehouses. When Philex decided to resume sale in 1975, the sugar had already deteriorated, production had to be cut, and workers lost jobs.

After the flop of Philex, Marcos decided to have tighter control of the industry and established the Philippine Sugar Commission (Philsucom). Philsucom had blanket authority over the industry, given the power to "act as the single agency engaged in the buying and selling of sugar". Additionally, the Presidential Degree 1192 provided Philsucom:

- exclusive control over the marketing cooperatives traditional controlled by the hacienderos;
- authority to invest its funds in any activity related to sugar production and trading;
- powers to issue bonds and securities which were fully guaranteed by the government;
- tax-free importation of materials and equipment by Philsucom and its affiliates.

The presidential degree allowed Philsucom to have complete monopoly of the sugar industry in the Philippines. It then created a trading arm, the National Sugar Trading Corporation (NASUTRA), which was exclusively responsible for domestic and international sugar trading.

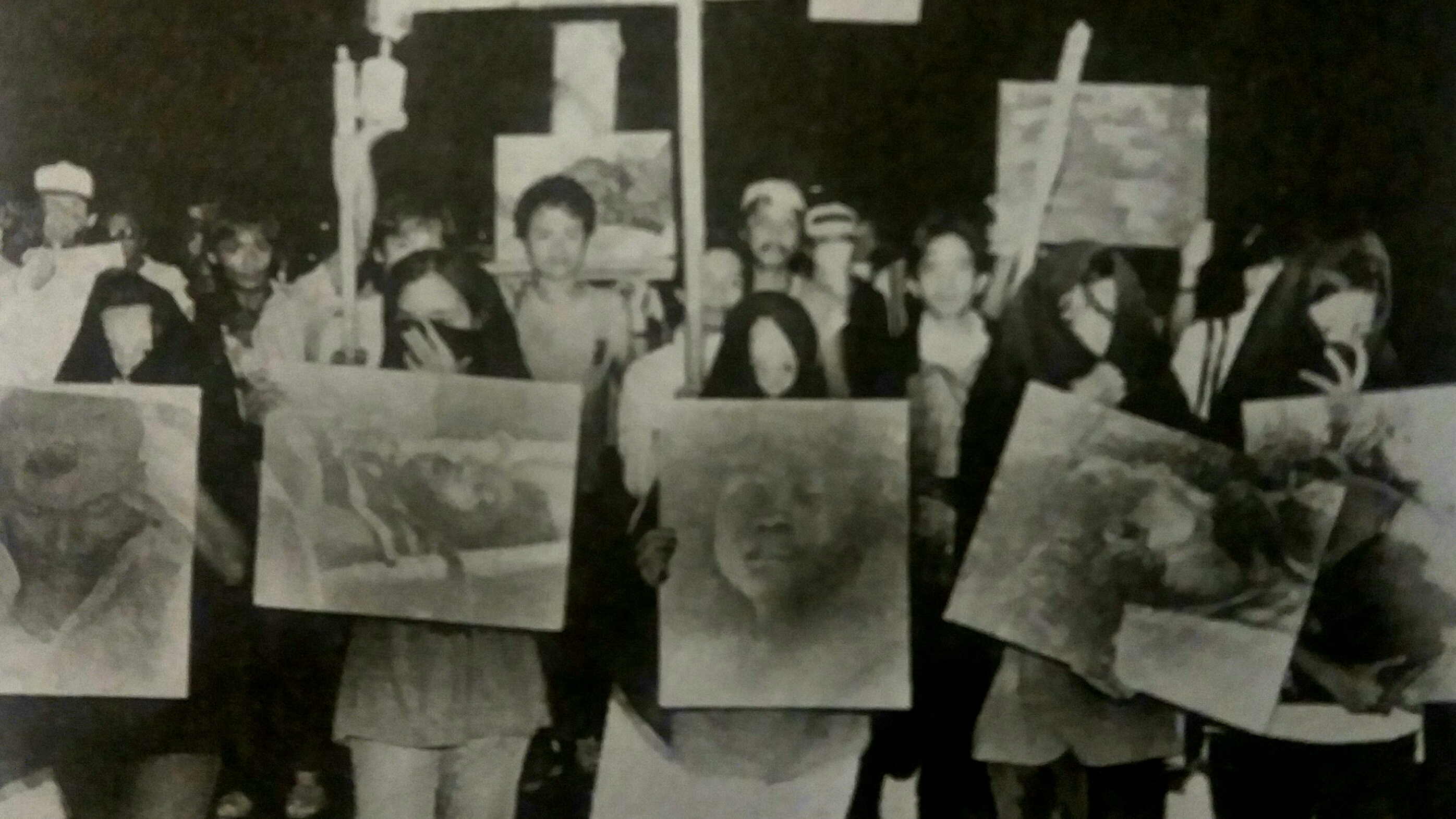
Protest in 1986 demanding accountability in Escalante massacre

Roberto Benedicto headed both Philsucom and NASUTRA. Benedicto and his associates consistently milked the industry by manipulating trading and pricing policy, indiscriminate stealing from industry inventories, control over mills, and ordering military to massacre workers who protested against unfair working conditions. Benedicto controlled the market by using methods he practiced in Philex, such as:

- setting the composite price of crops for $0.113 per pound in 1980–81, despite the prevailing international market price set at a minimum of $.027. This meant that the industry received less than half of the market price, while NASUTRA gained the majority of profits. Similarly, he underpaid the industry by buying a picul of sugar for $18.16 and selling it internationally for $63.70. NASUTRA generated $700 million within only less than three years of operations, while farmers continued to live with dismal wages.
- delaying the pay of hacenderos and waiting for exchange rates in computing the equivalent of sugar exports.
- evading taxes, and procured loans he never paid.

Their monopoly of the sugar industry rippled adverse effects, hurting the livelihoods of poor farmers. Philsucom-NASUTRA forced many sugar planters into bankruptcy or deep in debt. In 1984, over 190,000 sugar workers lost their livelihood, and about a million sacadas and their families suffered through the 1985 Negros famine.

Many labor organizations and movements were established, with some protests ending in violence and murder. In 1981, a group of planters and workers from Negros filed a class-action suit in the Supreme Court against the Philsucom and NASUTRA. They demanded the end of sales of sugar crops without planters' consent, and annual existing long-term export contracts. They contended that they are being deprived of earnings because the buying price of sugar is far too low.

In 1985, protesters in Negros Occidental gathered in the town center to mark the 13th anniversary of the declaration of Martial Law, and to remember its damages in their town and livelihood. The crowd was an estimated 5000 sugar workers, farmers, students and church activists. The protesters were gunned down by paramilitary forces, killing around 20-30 people. This is now known as the Escalante Massacre.

== Coconut industry ==
One of the most infamous forms of graft and corruption of the Marcos administration was the Coco Levy Fund, controlled by Eduardo 'Danding' Cojuangco and Juan Ponce Enrile. The fund was originally drafted in 1971, which required taxing every kilo of copra sold, supposedly for shares of stocks that will support the coconut farmers as the industry develops. However, the farmers never received returns promised to them by the Cocofed and Philippine Coconut Authority, which were the organizations that oversaw the levy collecting and supposedly represented the interests of the farmers. The total collected fund is an estimated amount of P100 billion to P150 billion.

Enrile and Cojuangco used the taxes collected to invest in and acquire businesses. Some of these included United Coconut Planters Bank and San Miguel Corporation. Cojuangco bought UCPB and became its president. Cojuangco received assistance from Marcos in purchasing UCPB. Marcos granted the PD 755, which authorized the Philippine Coconut Authority to use the funds to "draw and utilize the levy collections to pay for the financial commitments" connected to UCPB. PD 755 legitimized what Enrile and Cojuangco had been doing. More help from Marcos came with the Central Bank authorization for UCPB to become a universal bank. It meant UCPB was allowed to venture into other non-coconut oriented activities, and that the bank was allowed to "invest funds collected from farmers in a private corporation which will pool and coordinate the resources of the farmers and the coconut oil millers in buying, milling, and marketing copra and its by-products". Later, Marcos granted PD 1468, which declared the money as private and prevented any government audit.

Cojuangco acquired San Miguel Corporation (SMC) with the funds from the levy. SMC is one of the oldest and largest beer, food, packaging and livestock conglomerate in the Philippines. President Marcos gave favors to SMC once Cojuangco became its head. Taxes were raised for liquor and cigarettes in January 1986, but excise taxes on beer went down. Beer is one of the main products of SMC, which helped the corporation save as much as $40 million that year.

== Logging concessions ==
Over 8 million hectares of forest trees were wiped out during the Marcos administration, 2 million damaged beyond the point of recovery. The sheer scale of this mass deforestation is equal to 81% of the size of the island of Mindanao. Logs were exported to Korea, Taiwan, and Japan, countries who also had natural forests but chose to preserve them.

In the 1970s, over 200 timber licensing agreements (TLA) were granted, mostly to the President's allies and relatives. This number slowly decreased after the Marcos dictatorship, allowing the forests to recover. Many of these agreements violated the maximum 100,000 hectare land area for logging, and between 1960 and 1970, 300,000 hectares of forests were being destroyed. Concessionaires were also allowed to cut naturally-grown trees in rainforests, a practice that is frowned upon due to the lack of accountability. The trees were not planted by the loggers, and thus were not accountable to replace them.

This all took place despite Marcos' pronouncements as president, where he often wrote speeches on the importance of natural resources as a national investment, particularly of forests and logging. He spoke of forest resources as directly related the welfare of the people and the environment, denounced illegal loggers who "push back our tribal forest settlers to the innermost recesses of our forest lands", and imposed heavy penalties on offenders.

Despite his anti-illegal logging rhetoric, Marcos himself handed over numerous concessions to his close associates. Among them were Juan Tavera, a presidential assistant who owned Twin Peaks Corp., Fortuna Marcos-Barba, the president's sister, and Alfonso Lim, who was given 7 logging concessions in Northern Luzon with a land area of more than 600,000 hectares. This is five times the constitutional limit of a hundred thousand hectares of logging for any one family. Lim had logging and wood-based companies in Cagayan. His strong political ties allowed him to avoid payment of license fees amounting to $123,000 by 1986, a treatment in contrast to his competitors. For example, the Dupaya family from Cagayan claimed that the Philippine Constabulary halted their logging operators, and they were threatened by 'the Enrile people' referring to former Secretary of Defense Juan Ponce Enrile. The government also extended military support to Alfonso Lim, with one of his companies enlisting 150 soldiers and 50 security guards. The Philippine Military trained draftees, and Lim paid for their salaries and provided their weapons.

Herminio Disini, a Marcos crony known for his tobacco monopoly, also had dealings with agriculture and logging. Disini had timber and pulpwood operations in Abra and Kalinga-Apayao in Northern Luzon. Hundreds of families and indigenous groups were evicted for the benefit of his company, backed by presidential degrees. In 1973, Disini's company, Cellophil Resources Corporation (popularly known simply as Cellophil), was granted logging concessions in Abra and Kalinga-Apayao. They were given authority to exploit 99,565 hectares of pine trees in the area, despite violating two articles of the 1973 Constitution. Articles II and XV of the Constitution provided that the "State shall respect the customs and traditions of cultural minorities and ensure their development as self-reliant communities". Another presidential decree banned all logging operations in the Ilocos region, except for Cellophil. Marcos also issued PD 410, declaring that ancestral lands should be cultivated and set aside for the exclusive use of indigenous peoples. However, the province of Abra was excluded from the decree, conveniently because Disini had his logging concessions there. This raised fears among the Tinggians, the indigenous group whose ancestral land now being destroyed by Disini's loggers. The Tinggians petitioned Marcos for inclusion but they were snubbed. Disini's companies victimized the indigenous groups dwelling in his logging area. The Tinggians reported seeing roving jeeps of guards, and that their rice fields, pasture lands, and communal forests were usurped.

Cellophil forcibly took 55 hectares of agricultural land in Northern Luzon, affecting not only the Tingguians but also the Kalingas and the Bontocs. Cellophil forced the farmers to sell their lands. In Gaddani, Tayum, farmers were forced to sell their lands at a price dictated by the Cellophil, and those refused had their crops bulldozed and their water supply cut off. Cellophil also threatened to acquire a presidential decree to confiscate the lands if the farmers refused to comply. The Tinggians organized to prepare to fight for their rights and their way of life. The government responded by imposing complete militarization in areas with logging activities. The Philippine Constabulary banned community meetings, declared that opposition to Cellophil activities were "anti-government" and "subversive", and forced people to work on community roads and bridges without pay. They were offered bribes to cease their protests, yet the tribes continued. Affected tribes called for a peace pact and drafted a resolution to Marcos, informing the President of Cellophil's refusal of a fair dialogue and their military harassment. They did not receive a reply, and Cellophil continued to destroy their ancestral domains.

== Electricity ==
Before Ferdinand Marcos came into power, MERALCO was wholly owned and managed by Don Eugenio Lopez Sr. of the Lopez clan, one of the richest families in the country. The Lopez family owned 33% shares of the MERALCO, the rest of the shares being owned by the public. To force Lopez to give up his shares, the Marcos government reduced the authorized utility rate increase from 36.5% to 20.9%, forcing MERALCO to incur losses. Benjamin "Kokoy" Romualdez, a brother of First Lady Imelda Marcos, controlled this transaction and forced Lopez to transfer his shares in MERALCO to the Meralco Foundation, a newly formed corporation by Romualdez. He also told Lopez that his son Eugenio Jr., who was charged with attempting to assassinate Marcos, would be released from jail, if he agreed to Romualdez's terms. Critics believed that the 'assassination attempt' was a set-up to implicate members of rich families. The elder Lopez conceded and turned over the family's shares to Kokoy. Lopez sold Meralco to Romualdez for a downpayment of only Php 10,000 a ridiculously low amount for the purchase of a national power utility worth $20 million. However, Romualdez did not hold his end of the bargain and Eugenio Jr continued to languish in prison. When Lopez Sr. died of cancer in 1975, his son was still in jail and only later managed to escape.

Romualdez managed to create a loophole in the terms of the agreement to prevent further payments. MERALCO was purchased through the Meralco Foundation, a private organization owned and managed by Romuladez. As soon as he acquired MERALCO, electric rates were increased by 100% and continually increased throughout his management. He created a new pricing scheme that came in the form of a rate adjustment clause, which allowed MERALCO to adjust its rates depending on crude oil increase or higher dollar exchange rates. The Meralco Foundation defaulted on its payments in 1985 and the shares were reverted to the original owners. The Lopezes were able to recover some of their shares between 1986 and 1991, owning 16% of the company.

== Cigarette industry ==
Monopolization of the tobacco industry in the Philippines was another evidence of Marcos' favors to his relatives and associates. Herminio Disini was Marcos' golfing partner and was married to Dr. Paciencia Escolin, Imelda Marcos' first cousin and personal physician. Disini organized Philippine Tobacco Filters Corp (PFTC) in 1970, supplemented by 30% investment by Baumgartner Papiers of Switzerland. To aid his business, Marcos issued Presidential Decree 750 which ordered the increase in tariffs of the raw materials of Disini's main competitor, Filtrona Philippines Inc. The decree increased the tariffs from 10% to 100%, claiming that its aim was to ensure "fair competition in the local cigarette industry". Filtrona consequently ran out of business, while Disini's company remained exempt from the tax increase. Disini controlled 75% of the market for manufacture and distribution of tobacco filters. After establishing his name in the industry, Disini organized Techosphere Manufacturers and Recyclers Inc., which produced cigarette filters and pipe mixtures. As he began taking over manufacturing cigarettes and filters, Marcos issued PD 1858, which lowered import duties on the acetate tow Disini imported from 20% to 10%.

Lucio Tan, now one of Asia's richest businessmen, was also considered one of the cronies of Ferdinand Marcos. One of his main companies is Fortune Tobacco Corporation, which was one of the Philippines' largest cigarette makers. Because of his friendship with Marcos, Fortune Tobacco Corporation was given tax, customs, financing and regulatory breaks that allowed his business to prosper as a domestic monopoly. Tan also wrote a cigarette tax code that Marcos signed into law. Despite big tax breaks, Tan still allegedly falsified internal revenue stamps to use for his cigarette packs and smuggled cigarettes to evade taxes. Tan has refused to disclose financial data on his companies to the Philippine government. After Marcos was ousted and exiled to Hawaii in 1986, Tan wrote an open letter to President Corazon Aquino, stating that "We can proudly say that we have never depended on dole-outs, government assistance of monopoly protection throughout our history".

== Broadcast media ==
Roberto Benedicto, also known for his sugar monopoly, had a media and telecommunications empire in the Philippines. He owned a small radio station that transformed into the Kanlaon Broadcasting System (KBS) (now Radio Philippines Network) that consisted of three television stations, 15 radio stations and a national newspaper called Philippines Daily Express. In 1972, news and media outlets were forced to cease operations and their facilities were taken over by the military. However, Benedicto was allowed to continue his broadcasts, as they served as the voice of the Marcos dictatorship. This was beneficial to Benedicto, as it secured his political ties with Marcos and generated income as the owner of the sole running television and radio stations. Benedicto assigned Enrique Romualdez, a relative of the first lady, as chief editor of the paper to ensure that it held the views of the regime.

KBS was the only full-color TV channel in the country, and it was later taken over by Imee Marcos. Benedicto expanded his media business by acquiring Intercontinental Broadcasting Corporation (IBC) which had five television stations, and nine radio stations. His growing media empire received government favors from the Marcos administration, with the President granting several Letters of Instruction (LOIs) for Benedicto's benefit. In 1977, Marcos issued LOI 640 to allow Banahaw Broadcasting Corporation, one of Benedicto's companies, to import $3 million worth of TV transmission equipment and facilities, without paying taxes or tariffs. The LOI also allowed tax-free importation of $15 million worth of 12-inch black and white television sets for the next five years. It also allowed Banahaw to commission a local company to assemble the television sets, justifying that these sets would be sold to total areas with lower prices. The LOI then instructed government agencies to market the TV sets. The ministries of Public Information, National Defense, Education and Culture, were instructed to use the sets for their public information and educational projects.

In 1982, Marcos issued LOI 640-A, to extend the scope and duration of the earlier order. The new instruction directed government ministries to distribute Benedicto's television sets in the countryside areas "on matters pertaining to peace and order". Due to the tax breaks, Benedicto was all to sell 12-inch black and white television sets cheaper than the competitors who had to pay taxes. The Consumer Electronic Products Manufacturers Association (CEPMA) complained that the television sets meant for rural areas were being sold in Manila, greatly affecting their market.

== Publishing ==
One of the biggest players in the publishing industry in post-war Philippines was Hans Menzi, a Brigadier General in the air force. He owned many businesses in agricultural and publishing sector. During Marcos' first presidential term, Menzi served as his military aide. Menzi was the publisher of Manila Daily Bulletin, the largest and most extensive English daily during the Marcos administration. Some of its successes include accounting for almost half of the total advertisements of the top seven dailies. Menzi's publishing empire consisted of Panorama, the Sunday magazine of the Bulletin, the daily Tempo, Balita, WHO, Liwayway, Bisaya, Banawag, and Song Cavalcade and Top Melodies magazines. Menzi was also the general manager of a high-quality pulp and paper mill which supplied the paper needs of the newspaper industry.

When Marcos declared Martial Law, he ordered the shutdown of media establishments, and arrested journalists labelled 'subversives'. However, Menzi's Manila Daily Bulletin was allowed to resume publication, on the conditions that Menzi reduces his shares of the company, and that the publication take on a new name. Menzi presented several nameplates and logos to the President, and Marcos chose Bulletin Today, as it 'depicts the New Society'.

Rolando Gapud, a financial advisor of Marcos, arranged the take over of Menzi's corporations. They were able to take over Menzi's business interests in three stages:

- purchase of shares through nominees after the imposition of Martial Law in 1972;
- transfer of Menzi's interests through Hans Menzi Holdings & Management Inc. in 1983, engineered by Gapud; and
- acquisition of the bulk of Menzi's estate through an anomalous purchase in 1985 by Marcos agents

Through these steps, Marcos acquired 75% of Bulletin Publishing Corporation and 92% of Liwayway Publishing Corporation.

== See also ==
- Cronies of Ferdinand Marcos
- Oligarchy
