= Sugar Alliance of the Philippines =

The Sugar Alliance of the Philippines is a non-profit, industry association of the sugar industry of the Philippines. It is the biggest group of sugar planters and millers in the Philippines. Bloomberg says the alliance "works to promote better relations between sugar planters and millers, addressing industry problems, and other issues concerning the sugar industry." Its headquarters is located in Makati, Metro Manila, Philippines.

The Sugar Anti-Smuggling Organization is part of the alliance.

Members of the alliance include National Federation of Sugarcane Planters, the Unifed, the Panay Fed and Confed.

The Philippine Sugar Millers Association is a separate organization.
