= DWCT-AM =

Philippine radio station

DWCT
- Legazpi; Philippines
- Broadcast area: Albay and surrounding areas
- Frequency: 1557 kHz

Programming
- Format: Silent

Ownership
- Owner: Capitol Broadcasting Center

History
- First air date: March 2016
- Last air date: December 2019
- Call sign meaning: Capitol

Technical information
- Licensing authority: NTC

DWCT (1557 AM) was a radio station owned and operated by Capitol Broadcasting Center.

== History ==
The station was launched in March 2016 as Radyo Uno under the management of Vizcaya Media Productions. On December 2, 2019, its transmitter was damaged by Typhoon Tisoy, leaving the station off the air for good. During its existence, it was located at Zone 5, Sol's Subd., Brgy. Bitano, Legazpi, Albay.
