= Paluan =

Municipality in Occidental Mindoro, Philippines

- Municipality
- Municipality of Paluan
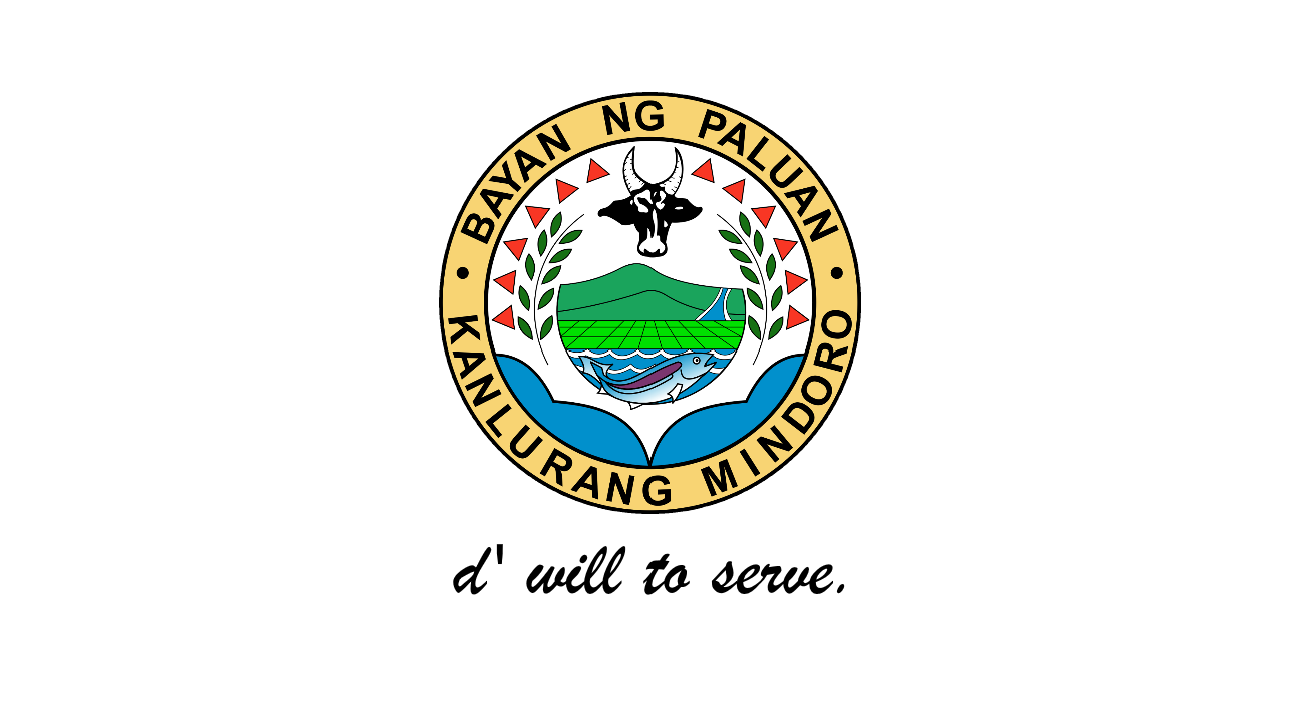
- Flag Seal

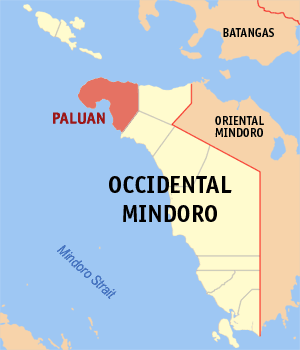
- Map of Occidental Mindoro with Paluan highlighted
- Interactive map of Paluan
- Location within the Philippines
- Coordinates: 13°25′N 120°28′E
- Country: Philippines
- Region: Mimaropa
- Province: Occidental Mindoro
- District: Lone district
- Founded: January 5, 1901
- Barangays: 12 (see Barangays)

Government
  - Type: Sangguniang Bayan
  - Mayor: Michael Diaz
  - Vice Mayor: Jasmin Fernandez
  - Representative: Leody “Odie” F. Tarriela
  - Electorate: 14,904 voters (2025)

Area
  - Total: 564.50 km^{2} (217.95 sq mi)
- Elevation: 58 m (190 ft)
- Highest elevation: 1,502 m (4,928 ft)
- Lowest elevation: 0 m (0 ft)

Population (2024 census)
  - Total: 19,461
  - Density: 34.475/km^{2} (89.289/sq mi)
  - Households: 4,241

Economy
  - Income class: 1st municipal income class
  - Poverty incidence: 40.25% (2023)
  - Revenue: ₱ 286.7 million (2024)
  - Assets: ₱ 767.4 million (2024)
  - Expenditure: ₱ 236.6 million (2024)
  - Liabilities: ₱ 75.76 million (2024)

Service provider
  - Electricity: Occidental Mindoro Electric Cooperative (OMECO)
- Time zone: UTC+8 (PST)
- ZIP code: 5107
- PSGC: 1705107000
- IDD : area code: +63 (0)43
- Native languages: Iraya; Tagalog

Paluan, officially the Municipality of Paluan (Tagalog: Bayan ng Paluan), is a municipality in the province of Occidental Mindoro, Philippines. According to the 2024 census, it has a population of 19,461 people.

== Geography ==
The town is located at the north-western tip of Mindoro Island. It lies along the north-east shore of Paluan Bay, approximately 7 miles southeast of Cape Calavite, a major sea-lane for inter-island and ocean-going vessels. The town is surrounded by rolling and steep mountain ranges, of which Mount Calavite with an altitude of 1,491 metres (4,892 ft) is the highest peak. At Mount Calavite point, the best panoramic view of Occidental Mindoro and nearby islands could be seen.

Paluan is a predominantly rural municipality, characterized by natural vegetation and an economy based mostly on agriculture. Its dominant land use is forest cover. Forestland occupies 31,826 hectares (78,640 acres) or 56% of total land area, planted with patches of fruit bearing trees and upland field crops. A large portion of forestland is restricted as a preservation area for wildlife and watershed, the 181.5 square kilometres (70.1 sq mi) Mount Calavite Wildlife Sanctuary. This area, which also includes Mount Calavite, is a habitat of various flora and fauna, such as the rare Mindoro tamaraw and the critically endangered Mindoro bleeding-heart (Gallicolumba platenae). Paluan has a 18,016.19 hectares (44,519.0 acres) of land classified as National Integrated Protected Areas System (NIPAS) area.

Agricultural lands cover 13,842 hectares (34,200 acres) or 24% of the total land area. About 17% is devoted to rice production while 4% is planted with upland crops such as vegetables and root crops, yet 80% or 10,897 hectares (26,930 acres) of agricultural land remains uncultivated. Open grasslands cover 18% or 10,428 hectares (25,770 acres) utilized for pasture.

=== Barangays ===
Paluan is politically subdivided into 12 barangays. Each barangay consists of puroks and some have sitios.

- Alipaoy
- Bagong Silang Pob. (Barangay 5)
- Handang Tumulong Pob. (Barangay 2)
- Harrison
- Lumangbayan
- Mananao
- Mapalad Pob. (Barangay 1)
- Marikit
- Pag-Asa Ng Bayan Pob. (Barangay 4)
- San Jose Pob. (Barangay 6)
- Silahis Ng Pag-Asa Pob. (Barangay 3)
- Tubili

=== Climate ===
Climate data for Paluan, Occidental Mindoro
Month	Jan	Feb	Mar	Apr	May	Jun	Jul	Aug	Sep	Oct	Nov	Dec	Year
Mean daily maximum °C (°F)	28 (82)	29 (84)	30 (86)	31 (88)	31 (88)	30 (86)	29 (84)	29 (84)	29 (84)	29 (84)	29 (84)	28 (82)	29 (85)
Mean daily minimum °C (°F)	22 (72)	21 (70)	22 (72)	23 (73)	25 (77)	25 (77)	25 (77)	25 (77)	25 (77)	24 (75)	23 (73)	22 (72)	24 (74)
Average precipitation mm (inches)	48 (1.9)	32 (1.3)	41 (1.6)	54 (2.1)	257 (10.1)	410 (16.1)	466 (18.3)	422 (16.6)	429 (16.9)	300 (11.8)	137 (5.4)	92 (3.6)	2,688 (105.7)
Average rainy days	10.8	8.0	9.8	11.7	23.1	27.5	29.2	28.7	28.7	25.5	18.2	12.8	234
Source: Meteoblue

== Economy ==
Poverty incidence of Paluan (%)

Source: Philippine Statistics Authority

== History ==
Paluan became a municipality on January 5, 1901, but its history dates back to the early 17th century when the village was known as the Religious District of Calavite.

== Demographics ==
Population census of Paluan
Year	Pop.	±% p.a.
1903	1,345	—
1918	2,418	+3.99%
1939	3,305	+1.50%
1948	2,718	−2.15%
1960	4,597	+4.48%
1970	5,383	+1.59%
1975	7,346	+6.43%
1980	7,438	+0.25%
1990	7,549	+0.15%
1995	11,234	+7.73%
2000	12,023	+1.47%
2007	13,718	+1.84%
2010	15,223	+3.86%
2015	16,025	+0.98%
2020	18,566	+3.15%
2024	19,461	+1.14%
Source: Philippine Statistics Authority

== Education ==
The Abra de Ilog-Paluan Schools District Office governs all educational institutions within the municipality. It oversees the management and operations of all private and public, from primary to secondary schools.

=== Primary and elementary schools ===
- Absukot Primary School
- Apis Elementary School
- Agbalite Katutubo Excel School
- Agdilaw Minority School
- Alacaak Minority School
- Binuangan Katutubo Excel School
- Pinagbayanan Minority School
- Hinugasan Minority School
- Ignonok Elementary School
- Igsuso Elementary School
- Kalangigan Elementary School
- Kalansan Minority School
- Katuray Minority School
- Lamont Adventist Elementary School
- Lumangbayan Elementary School (Paluan)
- Mamara Min. Elementary School
- Mananao Elementary School
- Marikit Elementary School
- Marikit ES Annex
- Paluan Central School
- Paluan Central School (Annex)
- Pamutusin Elementary School
- Pinagbayanan Katutubo Excel School
- Tubili Elementary School

=== Secondary school ===
- Paluan National High School
