= National Nutrition Council =

Philippine health government agency

- Pambansang Sanggunian sa Nutrisyon

Agency overview
- Formed: June 24, 1974
- Jurisdiction: Philippines
- Headquarters: Taguig, Metro Manila
- Employees: 93 (2024)
- Annual budget: ₱488.02 million (2021)
- Agency executive: Azucena M. Dayanghirang, Executive Director
- Website: www.nnc.gov.ph

The National Nutrition Council (NNC; Filipino: Pambansang Sanggunian sa Nutrisyon) is an agency of the Philippine government under the Department of Health responsible for creating a conducive policy environment for national and local nutrition planning, implementation, monitoring and evaluation, and surveillance using state-of the art technology and approaches.

== History ==
The creation of the Philippine Institute of Nutrition as a first attempt to institutionalize a national nutrition program.

In 1958, PIn reorganized into the Food and Nutrition Research Center (FNRC) under the Science and Development Board.

In 1960, the National Coordinating Council on Food and Nutrition (NCCFN), a loose organization of government and nongovernment agencies and organizations involved in nutrition and related projects, was organized.

In 1971, Executive Order No. 285 was promulgated, mandating the National Food and Agriculture Council (NFAC) to coordinate nutrition programs in addition to coordinating national food programs, thus, superseding the NCCFN.

In 1974, Presidential Decree No. 491 (Nutrition Act of the Philippines, June 24, 1974), which created the National Nutrition Council (NNC) as the highest policy-making and coordinating body on nutrition, was promulgated.

By 1985, in the Negros famine, a survey by the National Nutrition Council estimated that about 350,000 children – 40 percent of Negros Occidental residents under the age of 14 – were suffering from malnutrition.

1985 infant death statistics at Bacolod Hospital rose 67 percent, and Negros' infant mortality rose to nearly double the national average, with most of the deaths attributed to malnutrition.

In 1987, Executive Order No. 234 (Reorganization Act of NNC, July 22, 1987) was promulgated, reaffirming the need for an intersectoral national policy-making and coordinating body on nutrition. It expanded the membership of the NNC to include the Departments of Budget and Management (DBM), Labor and Employment (DOLE), Trade and Industry (DTI), and National Economic and Development Authority (NEDA). The Department of Social Welfare and Development was named chair of the NNC Governing Board.

In 1988, Administrative Order No. 88 named the Department of Agriculture as the NNC Chair of the NNC Governing Board.

In 1995, Republic Act No. 8172, An Act Promoting Salt Iodization Nationwide, designated the NNC together with the Department of Environment and Natural Resources, and a representative each from the medical profession and the salt industry, as the Salt Iodization Advisory Board (SIAB). The SIAB is the policy-making body and coordinating body for the salt iodization program.

In 2000, Republic Act No. 8976, Food Fortification Act of 2000, designated the NNC as advisory body on food fortification. As such, the NNC shall set policies on food fortification, i.e. what foods to be fortified with what micronutrient.

In 2003, NEDA-Social Development Committee through Resolution No. 1 Series 2003, Expanding the Function and Composition of the Multisectoral Committee on International Human Development Commitments, designated the NNC as lead agency for fighting hunger and malnutrition.

In 2005, Executive Order No. 472 named the Department of Health as the chair of the NNC, with the DA and DILG as vice-chairs. It also called the NNC to re-orient its operations to be more client-oriented and to prioritize addressing hunger and malnutrition, and authorized NNC to generate and mobilize resources.

On November 29, 2018, Philippine President Rodrigo Duterte signed Republic Act 11148 titled "Kalusugan at Nutrisyon ng Mag-Nanay Act" which focuses on multi-sectoral programs and interventions focused on the First 1,000 Days of life as the golden window of opportunity. On May 2, 2019, DOH Secretary Francisco T. Duque III signed the Implementing Rules and Regulations of RA 11148 which was crafted through a series of national and sub-national consultations involving LGU officials, government agencies, key public and private groups, local and international NGO partners, stakeholders, and champions. The IRR states that the Nurturing Care Framework developed by WHO, UNICEF and The World Bank Group will be applied in the implementation of the law.

== See also ==
- Nutrition Foundation of the Philippines, Inc.
- Nutriskwela Community Radio Network
- Negros island famine
