= DZYM =

DZYM is the callsign of Radyo Pilipino Corporation's two stations in San Jose, Occidental Mindoro:

- DZYM-AM, branded as Radyo Pilipino
- DZYM-FM, branded as One FM
