= DXOC =

DXOC may refer to:

- DXOC-AM, an AM radio station broadcasting in Ozamiz, branded as Radyo Pilipino
- DXOC-FM, an FM radio station broadcasting in Valencia, Bukidnon, branded as Radyo Lampornas
