= 1494 AM =

AM radio frequency

The following radio stations broadcast on AM frequency 1494 kHz:

== Australia ==
- VL2AY: Albury, New South Wales

== China ==
- Fujian RGD in Lianjiang
- Hulun Buir in Hailar

== Japan ==
- JOYR in Okayama (RSK)
- JOTL in Nayoro (HBC)

== New Zealand ==
- Radio Sport in Timaru
- AM Network in Hamilton (Parliamentary programming)

== The Philippines ==
- DWSS/DWAR: Manila
- DXOC in Ozamiz
