= KZKZ (Philippines) =

- Manila; Philippines
- Frequency: 1110 kHz

Ownership
- Owner: Henry Hermann (1922–1924); Radio Corporation of the Philippines

History
- First air date: 1924
- Last air date: 1925 (merged into KZRQ; license deleted in 1931)
- Call sign meaning: Call signs starting with KZ were issued by the U.S. government to Philippine radio stations

KZKZ was the first broadcasting station authorized in the Philippines. The station was first authorized in 1924, on 1110 kHz [wavelength of 270.1 meters], to the Electrical Supply Company at 109 Plaza Moraga in Manila Although there had been earlier experimental broadcasts dating back to 1922, KZKZ was the first standard broadcasting station authorized in the Philippines.

As early as September 1924, KZKZ was reported to be broadcasting health news. One early report listed KZKZ as operating with 100 watts on 1110 kHz. However, at the same time a shipboard radio operator, located at Manila, stated that the station was broadcasting on 400 meters [750 kHz], with a power of 250 watts and a schedule of 8:30 to 9:30 nightly.

The individual responsible for the station's start was Henry Hermann, owner of the Electrical Supply Company in Manila. At the time, stations in the Philippines carried U.S. call signs, though the United States Department of Commerce did not regulate them. Later that year, the station was sold to the Radio Corporation of the Philippines. Power was upgraded to 500 watts.

Radio Corporation of the Philippines merged with the Far Eastern Radio Corporation in September 1925. Far Eastern owned station KZRQ, which survived the merger while KZKZ was shuttered. In 1926, the organization began work on constructing two of the largest radio stations in Asia with the idea of maintaining direct Manila-San Francisco service.

KZKZ was not listed as being deleted until a mid-1931 issue of the Federal Radio Commission's Radio Service Bulletin.

== See also ==
- DYRC
- DZLT
