= Filipinas Broadcasting Network =

Philippine radio network

- Type: Private
- Industry: Broadcast
- Founded: April 5, 1960
- Founder: Edmundo Cea
- Headquarters: Makati, Metro Manila, Philippines
- Key people: Diana Cea-Gozum President

Filipinas Broadcasting Network is a Philippine radio network. Its corporate office is located at Rm. 306, Legaspi Towers 200 Bldg., Paseo de Roxas Ave., Makati.

== FBN stations ==
=== FM stations ===
Branding	Callsign	Frequency	Location
Sigaw	DWRC	95.5 MHz	Legazpi
DWEB	DWEB	99.9 MHz	Nabua

=== AM stations ===
Callsign	Frequency	Location
DZCV	684 kHz	Tuguegarao

=== Former stations ===
Callsign	Frequency	Location	Years owned	Status
DWXT	96.1 MHz	Tarlac City	1981-1983	Sold to the Radio Corporation of the Philippines.
DZXT	936 kHz	Tarlac City	1961-1983	Sold to the Radio Corporation of the Philippines.
DXGS	765 kHz	General Santos	1965-1983	Sold to the Radio Corporation of the Philippines.
DXOC	1494 kHz	Ozamiz	1959-1983	Sold to the Radio Corporation of the Philippines.
DZRC	873 kHz	Legazpi	1960-2017	Off the air.
DZGE	855 khz	Canaman	1960-2018	Off the air.
DWLM	96.7 MHz	Lucena	1990-2024	License transferred to Caceres Broadcasting Corporation.
