= Romeo Olea =

Filipino journalist (1962–2011)

- Born: 1962
- Died: June 13, 2011 (aged 48–49); Iriga City, Philippines
- Occupation: Radio journalist
- Years active: 1998–2011
- Notable credit(s): Radio host, "Anything Goes" (DWEB-FM)
- Spouse: Raquel Olea
- Children: Jester Angelo and Janri Olea

Romeo Olea (1962 – June 13, 2011) was a Filipino radio commentator who worked for DWEB-FM in Iriga City, Philippines, prior to his being ambushed, receiving two shots in the back as he rode his motorcycle to work.

According to the National Union of Journalists of the Philippines, Olea’s murder marked the sixth media–related death under President Benigno Aquino, and the 145th since 1986 when democracy was restored. It was also the second killing of a DWEB radio broadcaster within a year.

== Death ==
Filipino radio commentator Romeo Olea, 49, was killed after being shot twice in back as he rode his motorcycle to work around 5:30 a.m. on June 13, 2011. The ambush occurred along the road Olea usually takes to get to work; two empty 9 mm shells were recovered from the scene.

Olea was employed at DWEB-FM in Nabua, Camarines Sur, where he hosted his daily broadcast "Anything Goes," where he provided commentary on politics, current affairs, and government corruption.

While it remains unclear as to who committed the crime, senior police official, Victor Deona, said it was possible Olea's murder could have been related to his work. The motive for Olea's murder remains unconfirmed.

== Context ==
In 2011, the Committee to Protect Journalists ranked the Philippines third on its Impunity Index, regarding it as one of the worst countries not only in terms of the number of journalists murdered regularly, but also by the ability of the government to solve the related crimes. Iraq was ranked first and Somalia, second.

On July 9, 2010, part-time radio-announcer Miguel Belen was shot seven times by two motorcycle-riding attackers on his way home; he died a month later at a local hospital. Police have identified the suspects to Belen's killing as Eric Vargas and Gina Bagacina, an alleged member of the New People's Army. Olea’s murderers have yet to be identified.

Olea had been receiving text messages containing threats, according to his wife Raquel and DWEB co-workers at Benny Decena. It was unclear who sent the messages or what the messages said. Decena also said Olea had a premonition regarding his possible fate, which caused him to start carrying a gun.

According to DWEB acting assistant manager Jing Florece, Olea had been discussing on his show issues regarding a well-known political clan in Iriga, the Alfelor family. Florece added that, prior to Olea's killing, Olea had been addressing an incident that occurred during a basketball tournament in the city; moreover, he said Olea came across a video clip from the game that captured a heated exchange between an unknown person and the mayor of Iriga City, Madelaine Alfelor Gazmen. It had been reported Gazmen ordered the game to be stopped as her favorite team was losing, which resulted in a fight between the teams.

== Impact ==
The Burgos Media Center, a press advocacy group named after journalist Joe Burgos, stated that it will implement a program to better inform students press freedom issues. The center’s spokesman, Marc Joseph Alejo, said the purpose of the plan is to challenge the Aquino administration to make the Philippines safer for journalists.

The group also admonished the government for the lack of progress regarding the passing of the Freedom of Information Bill, an initiative to fight corruption by allowing citizens to access crucial public records, a cause Olea had been devoted to during his life.

== Reactions ==
Reporters Without Borders offered the following statements, "We extend our condolences to Olea's family and friends." "His murder is another tragic example of the complete lack of security for media workers in the Philippines and shows that the 'super body' that the justice minister created last year to reinforce efforts to combat violence against journalists has been insufficient."

Herminio R. Coloma, secretary of the Presidential Communications Operations Office in the Philippines, said that Olea was a "crusading journalist who exposed irregularities, for which he had been receiving threats to his life. We deplore the senseless killing."

Luis Raymund Villafuerte, governor of Camarines Sur, offered a reward of 500,000 pesos (US$11,500) for leads on the identities and whereabouts of Olea’s killers.

== Career ==
Romeo Olea began his career in radio broadcasting in 1998. He worked for DZGE in Canaman, DWKI in Iriga City, and DWEB-FM.

== Personal ==
Olea was survived by his wife, Raquel, and two children, Jester Angelo and Janri.
