= DZTC =

Radio station in Tarlac, Philippines

Radyo Pilipino Tarlac (DZTC)

Tarlac City; Philippines
- Broadcast area: Tarlac and surrounding areas
- Frequency: 828 kHz
- Branding: DZTC 828 Radyo Pilipino

Programming
- Languages: Kapampangan, Filipino
- Format: News, Public Affairs, Talk
- Network: Radyo Pilipino

Ownership
- Owner: Radyo Pilipino Corporation
- Sister stations: 96.1 One FM; RTV Tarlac Channel 26

History
- First air date: 1965
- Former frequencies: 800 kHz (1965–1978)
- Call sign meaning: Tarlac City

Technical information
- Licensing authority: NTC
- Power: 1,000 watts

DZTC (828 AM) Radyo Pilipino is a radio station owned and operated by Radyo Pilipino Corporation. It serves as the flagship station of the Radyo Pilipino network. The station's studios are located at RPMG Broadcasting Center, Mcarthur Highway, Brgy. San Nicolas, Tarlac City, and its transmitter located along Romulo Highway, Brgy. Baras-Baras, Tarlac City.

== History ==
DZTC commenced full operation in 1965 under ownership of Nation Broadcasting Corporation, owned by the Yabut Family. It was the second radio station established in Tarlac province after DZXT-AM of Filipinas Broadcasting Network. In September 1981, Radyo Pilipino Corporation acquired the station, with Eli Garcia and Francis Cardona managing the station. Its studios were located at the 4th Floor of Mariposa Building along F. Tanedo St. In 1991, after the killer quake in Northern and Central Luzon, DZTC moved to the Old White House along Ramos St., Brgy. San Vicente.
