= DWRC =

DWRC may refer to:

- DWRC-AM, a defunct AM radio station in Laoag
- DWRC-FM, a radio station in Legazpi, Albay, branded as Sigaw 95.5 Music & News FM
- DWRC-TV, a defunct television station in Daet
