= DWEB =

- Nabua; Philippines
- Broadcast area: Camarines Sur, Northern Albay
- Frequency: 99.9 MHz
- Branding: DWEB 99.9

Programming
- Languages: Rinconada, Filipino
- Format: Contemporary MOR, News, Talk
- Network: Bicol Media Network Group

Ownership
- Owner: Filipinas Broadcasting Network

History
- First air date: 1980
- Call sign meaning: Web (former branding)

Technical information
- Licensing authority: NTC
- Power: 10,000 watts
- ERP: 18,920 watts
- Transmitter coordinates: 13.385075, 123.353316

DWEB (99.9 FM) is a radio station owned and operated by Filipinas Broadcasting Network. The station's studio and transmitter are located at the Municipal Public Market, Brgy. San Antonio, Poblacion, Nabua.

Established in 1980, DWEB is the pioneer FM station in the province. It was formerly located in Naga from until 2010, when it relocated to Nabua. It used to carry a modern rock format during the 1990s and 2000s. It is currently part of the Bicol Media Network Group.

== Incident ==
Two DWEB radio journalists were killed within a year. Miguel Belen was assassinated July 9, 2010, by an alleged member of the New People's Army. Romeo Olea, who was radio show host of "Anything Goes," was assassinated June 13, 2011, after receiving death threats for his sharp political commentary.

== Franchise Issue ==
On February 3, 2022, the NTC Region V questioned the station for its current broadcast area when it was located in Brgy. Tabuco, Naga, Camarines Sur, according to its documents. By this time, it was known as Radyo Rinconada. It went off the air from February 12 to 18, when it returned on air as simply DWEB.
