= DZRC =

Defunct radio station in Legazpi

- Legazpi; Philippines
- Broadcast area: Albay and surrounding areas
- Frequency: 873 kHz

Programming
- Format: Silent

Ownership
- Owner: Filipinas Broadcasting Network
- Sister stations: Sigaw 95.5 Music & News FM

History
- First air date: 1960
- Last air date: 2017
- Former names: Radyo Champion
- Former frequencies: 890 kHz (1960–1978)
- Call sign meaning: Radyo Champion

Technical information
- Licensing authority: NTC

DZRC (873 AM) was a radio station owned and operated by Filipinas Broadcasting Network.

== History ==
DZRC was established as a commercial radio station; and at the time when the Philippines was under martial law, it was among the three in the city which were able to operate.

By mid-2000s, DZRC, at least, was the station that leased all of its operational hours to blocktimers instead of producing its own programs. In the country, blocktime is a common practice where journalists are required to buy radio timeslots, which would be sold to advertisers.

DZRC went off air in 2017.

== Legal actions ==
The station was involved in cases handled by the Supreme Court, where FBNI acted as the petitioner. In 1998, the petition was granted, dismissing a labor complaint filed by a station's volunteer reporter, citing lack of merit. In 2005, the petition was denied, affirming the 1992 decision of the Legazpi Regional Trial Court Branch 10 in a civil case where FBNI and two hosts of a radio documentary program were held liable for libel in relation to a 1989 exposé on alleged complaints against a medical school.

== Incidents and controversies ==
During the 1989 coup attempt, in the morning of December 1, elements of a military unit under Capt. Florencio Flores, who led the occupation of the Legazpi Airport, simultaneously took over DZRC and PLDT office. However, after half an hour, the unit was convinced by a provisional brigade to leave the premises, and later joined other forces at the airport.

On January 28, 1991, past 1 a.m., an explosion occurred at the station's compound, damaging glass windows and ceiling inside the building, as well as four nearby houses; and slightly injuring an employee. According to the police, unidentified men aboard a motorized tricycle left dynamite along with a note with message purportedly supporting Iraqi president Saddam Hussein—"Long Live Saddam, Criminal Bush"—believed to mislead investigators. The station manager reported that the station had received some threats from unknown groups through phone calls, as it aired commentaries concerning both issues in the locality and the Gulf War based on reports from news sources, particularly Voice of America and Radio Baghdad; but not towards Muslims and Iraqis in the city. The incident, along with another which was happened almost two hours later at another radio station in Kidapawan, Cotabato, was believed related to the war.

On February 11, 2004, Ruel Endrinal, one of the station's blocktimers who had been also a publisher of the Bicol Metro News and a critic of a provincial governor, was assassinated by two gunmen as he was on his way to work for his early morning program.

On November 21, 2005, a telephone conversation between a morning program host and a National Food Authority official was inadvertently broadcast live after the latter's interview. The former, reportedly failed to turn off the microphone in the booth, tried to extort cash from the official; but later denied the allegation.
