= DWGO-FM =

Radio station in Legazpi, Philippines

One FM Legazpi
Legazpi; Philippines
- Broadcast area: Albay and surrounding areas
- Frequency: 88.3 MHz
- Branding: 88.3 One FM

Programming
- Languages: Albayanon, Filipino
- Format: Contemporary MOR, OPM
- Network: One FM

Ownership
- Owner: Radio Corporation of the Philippines
- Sister stations: Radyo Pilipino Legazpi

History
- First air date: November 2015 (as DWRL); May 2020 (as One FM)

Technical information
- Licensing authority: NTC
- Power: 5 kW

Links
- Website: www.onefm.ph

88.3 One FM (DWGO 88.3 MHz) is an FM station owned and operated by the Radio Corporation of the Philippines. Its studios and transmitter are located at Purok 5, Brgy. Rawis, Legazpi, Albay.
