= Camarines Sur Polytechnic Colleges =

Public university in Camarines Sur, Philippines

- Politeknikong Kolehiyo kan Camarines Sur (Central Bikol)
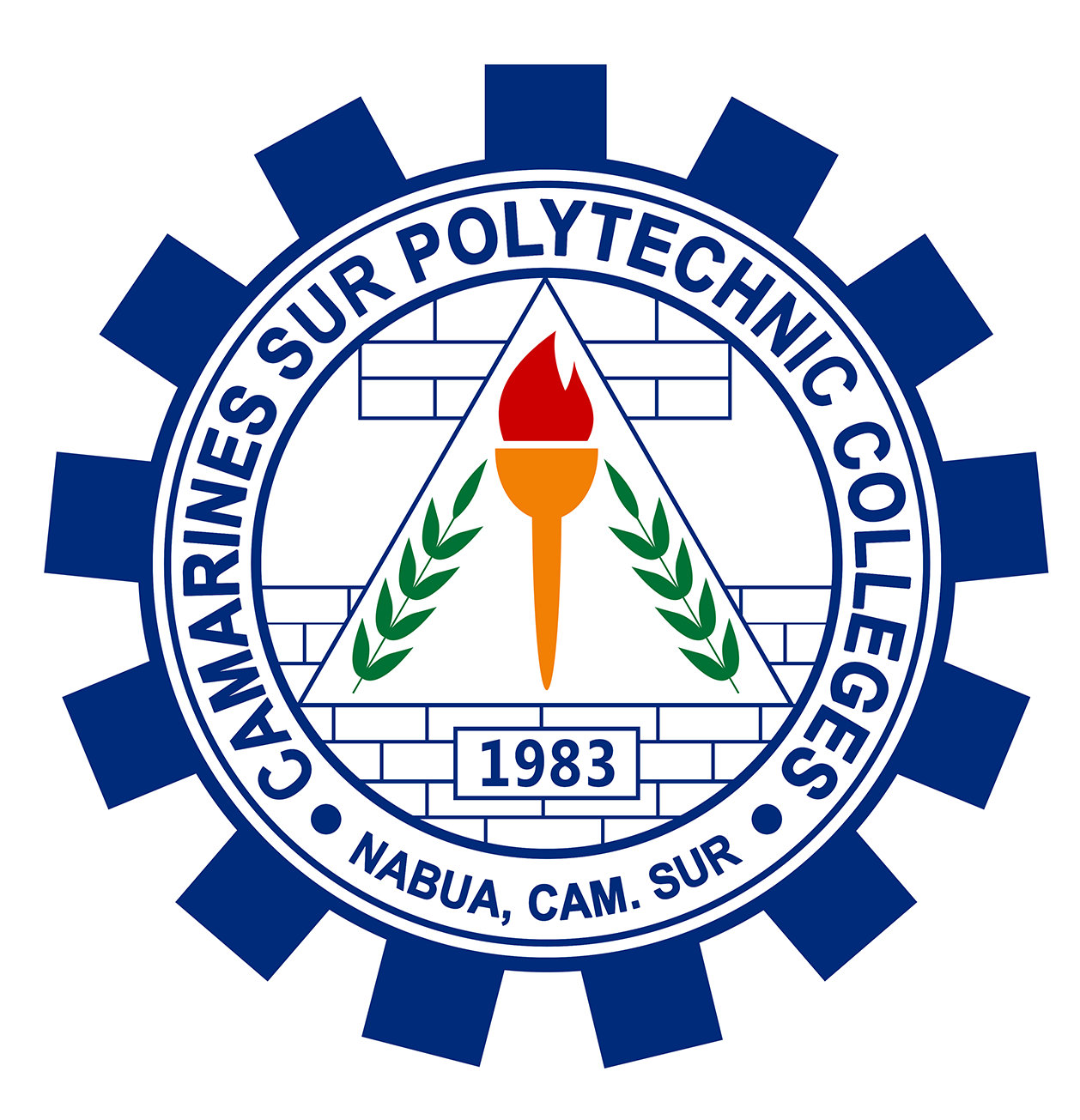
- College Seal of CSPC
- Type: Public Nonsectarian higher education institution
- Established: 1983; 43 years ago
- Academic affiliations: PASUC
- President: Dr. Amado A. Oliva, Jr.
- Dean: Engr. Martin D. Valeras (College of Engineering and Architecture); Dr. Kenny Niño Tagum (College of Health Sciences); Dr. Marlon SD. Pontillas (College of Arts and Sciences); Dr. Maria Joy I. Idian (College of Tourism, Hospitality, and Business Management); Ms. Rosel O. Onesa (College of Computer Studies); Dr. Patrick Gerard A. Paulino (College of Technological and Developmental Education); Dr. Leni M. Malabanan (Graduate School)
- Students: 13,963 (as of Second Semester of School Year 2024-2025)
- Location: Nabua, Camarines Sur, Philippines; 13°24′21.28″N 123°22′32.99″E
- Colors: Blue; White; Yellow
- Nickname: Blue Stallion
- Sporting affiliations: SCUAA
- Mascot: Blue Stallion
- Website: www.cspc.edu.ph
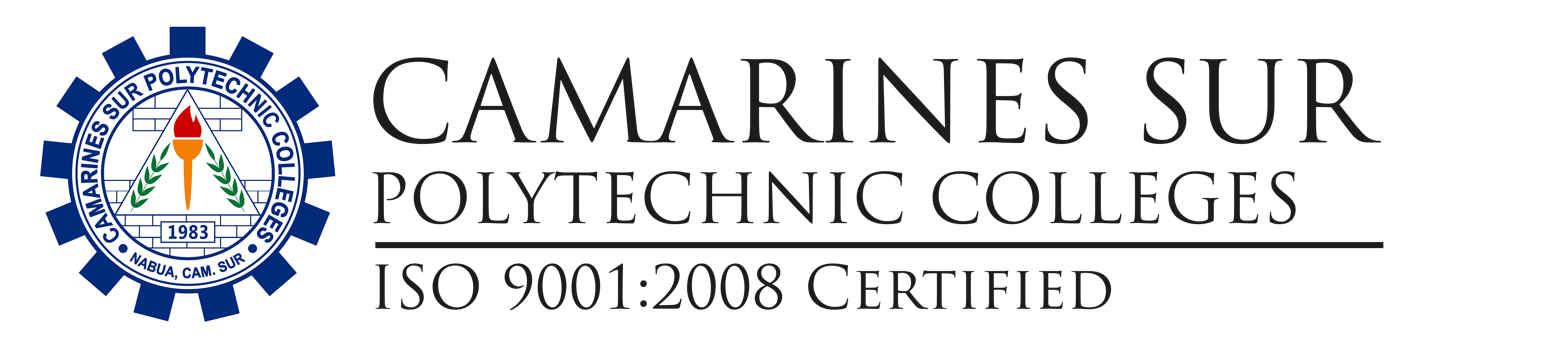

Camarines Sur Polytechnic Colleges is a state college in Nabua, Camarines Sur, Philippines. It is mandated primarily to provide higher technological, professional and vocational instruction and training in fisheries, trade, as well as short term technical and vocational courses, as the Board of Trustees may deem necessary, and shall promote research in the exploration and conservation of natural resources in the province. Its main campus is located in Nabua, Camarines Sur.

== History ==
=== Conception ===
Camarines Sur Polytechnic Colleges, popularly known as CSPC, was the brainchild of some prominent Nabueños who have long dreamt of having a community college in Nabua. Its establishment came into reality as a result of the feasibility study initiated by the defunct Bicol River Basin Development Program (BRBDP). Said undertaking is an inter-agency commitment with the aim of promoting a balance agro-industrial development in the region to achieve the national development goals of the 1980s.

The idea of having a community college within Nabua was first conceived by then Municipal Mayor, Atty. Ulpiano D. Duran, Sr. so that poor and deserving Nabueños who wish to take post-secondary and collegiate courses could be freed from the burden of going to other places and save a lot of their education. With the support of his Vice Mayor, Hon. Sofio Barela, Sr., the Sangguniang Bayan (municipal council) passed a resolution for the creation of a community college within the Nabua National High School. Atty. Duran submitted the resolution to then-Camarines Sur Governor Felix A. Fuentebella for approval and funding assistance.

Considering the merit of the request, Governor Fuentebella endorsed the proposal to BRBDP Director Col. Lorenzo Ballecer, a Nabueño, who then initiated the conduct of the feasibility study by his technical staff with the assistance of some personnel of Nabua National High School (NNHS). In the course of the study, the team did not only consider the establishment of a community college but also the possibility of putting up a state tertiary institution in the area. As a result of the study conducted, it came out to be very promising if a polytechnic college would be created.

=== Batas Pambansa 512 ===
With the very strong representation of his father, Assemblyman Arnulfo P. Fuentebella sponsored a bill creating a polytechnic college of NNHS using the result of the feasibility as basis, which later became Batas Pambansa (BP) Bilang 512, approved by the President Ferdinand E. Marcos on June 10, 1983.

Sec. 2 of BP 512 states that:

“The College shall primarily provide higher technological, professional, and vocational instruction and training in fisheries, trades and technology, arts and sciences, as well as short term technical and vocational courses, as the Board of Trustees may deem necessary, and shall promote research in the exploration and conservation of natural resources in the province.”

The immediate targets are the graduates of the barangay, private and public high schools, out of school youths and dropouts within Rinconada area, which comprises six municipalities and one city: Nabua, Baao, Bula, Bato, Buhi, Balatan and Iriga City.

The first organizational meeting of the college was held on February 22, 1985, at the Provincial Capitol of Camarines Sur. Deputy Minister Vedasto G. Suarez who represented the MECS Minister Jaime C. Laya, presided over the meeting. Government officials present were: Hon. Felix A. Fuentebella, Governor; Atty. Fernando O. Beriña, Provincial Kagawad; Atty. Ulpiano D. Duran Sr., Municipal Mayor; Dir. Carmelo R. Villacorta, BRBDP Director; Dr. Franciscpo Pili, BFAR Director; Dr. Ciriaco N. Divinagracia, CSSAC President; Engr. Aproniano Los Baños, Provincial Engineer; Mr. Constancio Cater, Provincial Administrator; Mr. Germites C. Dineros, NNHS Principal; Atty. Magno Catabijan Sr., MECS Legal Officer; and Atty. John Imlan, PASUC Administrative Officer. An Ad Hoc Committee was created headed by Dr. Ciriaco N. Divinagracia, the designated officer-in-charge. The committee was tasked to prepare the implementing guidelines for the operationalization of the college.

During its second organizational meeting on April 1, 1985, the implementing guidelines were approved and Provincial Kagawad Fernando O. Beriña was designated Officer-in-Charge. With only 11 personnel; five full-time instructors and six administrative personnel, the college has initially managed to run its affair. A total approximation of five hundred thousand pesos (₱500,000.00) was approved by the Provincial Government of Camarines Sur for the 1985 operation of the college as provided for in BP 512. Thereafter, the operation and maintenance shall be incorporated in the subsequent General Appropriation Act.

=== Opening ===
On May 7, 1985, the college opens its door for enrollment. For the first ten days, it seemed as if the target of 240 students could not be attained. But when enrollment closed on May 27, 1985, the target was overshot by 105 students or a total of 345 students, broken down as follows; One-Year Junior Business Machine Certificate, 87; One-Year Junior Electrical Certificates, 91; One-Year Junior construction Technical Certificate, 80.

Having no building of its own to accommodate its enrollees, a small office and six classrooms in the war-damaged building of NNHS were temporarily offered for use after classes, while drafting classes were held at the library.

=== Appointment and leadership of Dr. Corporal-Seña ===
On September 25, 1986, Dr. Lylia Corporal-Seña was appointed as the first President of CSPC. Under her leadership, she negotiated the temporary use of the Gabaldon Building owned by the Municipal Government of Nabua to accommodate the increasing enrolments. Day class schedules were opened. In the later part of 1986, the college rented a residential house owned by the Regalado family to house congested offices at the war-damaged building. This was the first attempt of the college to stand on its feet.

Inspired by the strong determination of the leadership of Dr. Seña, a three-classroom building was donated by the Engr. Cleto Descalso, a retired US Navy. This was the first building erected at the swampy 8-hectare site donated by the Provincial Government of Camarines Sur. In the same year, the Parents-Teachers Association initiated the construction of a four-classroom cottage made of light local materials. In the latter part of 1987, classes housed at the war-damaged building were all transferred to the new site. Unfortunately, the cottage lasted only for more than a year until it was totally destroyed by Typhoon Sisang.

It was during the term of Dr. Seña that the ladder-type curriculum came in full swing. Altogether, programs on instruction, student activities, administrative concerns, and infrastructure development were given priority.

With the end of her term, Mr. Ferdinand B. Valencia became the Officer-in-Charge from March 1, 1993 to May 15, 1997.

=== Academic and physical development ===
Conscious of the aim and objectives of technical education, improvements of program offered as well as infrastructure developments have been realized. Vital to student's development were clear-out policies for the on-the-job training, in-company training, and in-house training and affiliation as well as expansion of the scholarship programs on academic, band and majorettes, publication, athletics, Sangguniang Kabataan, and Barangay to poor but deserving students. Attempts for voluntary accreditation to Accrediting Agency of Chartered Colleges and Universities in the Philippines (AACCUP) have been started.

The campus was able to house more classrooms, college library, college museum, audio visual room, information technology building equipped with radio and communication dish satellite, computers, prayer room, chemistry and laboratory room, refrigeration and air conditioning room, machine shop, medical and dental clinics.

Construction of the Automotive and Shop Building was completed in 1995. It was followed by the newly constructed multi-purpose stage and landscaping of the campus which contributed much to physical development. Likewise, sports and athletics facilities improved with the construction of volleyball, basketball, and lawn tennis courts, and backfilling of almost one-hectare athletic and NROTC training field. The college library has a total collection of 7,185 volumes of books.

=== Presidency of Dr. Laniog ===
From May 16, 1997, to March 4, 1998, Dr. Lourdes G. Laniog served as the officer-in-charge of the college and eventually was appointed president on March 5, 1998. She served as president up to May 31, 2002.

Through the years, instruction, research and extension have been the focus of her leadership coupled with the hiring of additional teaching and non-teaching personnel, improvements of school facilities particularly the construction of covered court (but collapsed during the onslaught of Typhoon Rosing), construction and completion of Multi-Purpose Building, additional construction of covered walk, upgrading and restructuring of the Laboratory Shop Building, improvement of the water supply system, completion of the IT Building and rehabilitation of the Automotive and Machine Shop Building. Under her leadership, Secretary Raul Roco donated a two-classroom building and the improvement of the AVR through the funding assistance of Senator Ramon Magsaysay, Jr.

=== Presidency of Dr. Ilarde and Naga campus ===
The third college president, Dr. Monsito G. Ilarde, was appointed on May 27, 2002, and assumed office on July 1, 2002.

Pursuant to the Special Provision No. 2 of the Commission on Higher Education FY 2002 Budget and CSPC Board of Trustees Resolution No. 00-0044, the Bicol College of Arts and Trades - Naga City was integrated to the college and became CSPC - Naga City Campus.

=== Presidency of Dr. Atian ===
On May 3, 2011, Dr. Dulce Fajardo-Atian was appointed as the fourth College President. She envisioned CSPC as the regional center of excellence in polytechnic education. As such, continuing accreditations of all programs are in place and plans for opening of other curricular programs were considered to attain the goal of a university status. CSPC also embarked to be internationally recognized through its on-going endeavor for ISO accreditation.

=== Separation of Naga Campus ===
On October 19, 2012, President Benigno S. Aquino III signed Republic Act No. 10231, separating CSPC Naga Campus and converting it into Bicol State College of Applied Sciences and Technology (BISCAST).

=== Conversion to Polytechnic State University of Bicol ===
In 2017, House Bill No. 5119 entitled, “An Act Converting the Camarines Sur Polytechnic Colleges (CSPC) in the Municipality of Nabua, Province of Camarines Sur, into a State University to be known as the Polytechnic State University of Bicol," was filed by Hon. Salvador B. Belaro, Jr. of 1-ANG EDUKASYON Partylist as principal sponsor and Hon. Salvio B. Fortuno, representative of the 5th District of Camarines Sur, as co-sponsor.

On April 12, 2019, President Rodrigo Duterte signed Republic Act 11283, converting CSPC to Polytechnic State University of Bicol.

=== Presidency of Dr. Cadag ===
Following a search in 2019, Camarines Sur Polytechnic Colleges’ Board of Trustees named Dr. Charlito P. Cadag as the college's fifth president. Prior to this, Dr. Cadag was the Vice-President for Academic Affairs of Central Bicol State University of Agriculture. His four-year term commenced on July 10, 2019 and expired on July 9, 2023.

=== Presidency of Dr. Oliva ===
Dr. Amado A. Oliva, Jr., former Vice-President for Academic Affairs of CSPC, was elected as the sixth college president during a special Board of Trustees meeting held on November 23, 2023.

== College Presidents ==
Name	Title	Term
Dr. Amado A. Oliva, Jr.	6th President	November 23, 2023 – November 23, 2027
Dr. Dulce F. Atian	Officer-in-Charge	July 10, 2023 – November 22, 2023
Dr. Charlito P. Cadag	5th President	July 10, 2019 – July 9, 2023
Dr. Teresita B. Salazar	Officer-in-Charge	May 3, 2019 – July 9, 2019
Dr. Dulce F. Atian	4th President	May 3, 2011 – May 2, 2019
Dr. Monsito G. Ilarde	3rd President	July 1, 2002 – May 2, 2011
Dr. Lourdes G. Laniog	2nd President	May 16, 1997 – May 31, 2002
Mr. Ferdinand B. Valencia	Officer-in-Charge	March 1, 1993 – May 15, 1997
Dr. Lylia C. Sena	1st President	September 25, 1986 – February 28, 1993
Atty. Fernando O. Beriña	Officer-in-Charge	April 1985 – May 1986

== College Seal ==
The College Seal features four significant figures:

- The tower with an inscribed heart symbolizes hope and humility. Printed at the base of the tower is 1983, the year of its foundation.
- An inscribed triangle stands for the three major functions of the college: instruction, research, and extension.
- A flaming pine knot symbolizes the college’s quest for quality and competitive education.
- The inscribed gear represents fourteen regions of the Philippines, which symbolizes the college distinct mission to live within its macrocosm in the context of the countryside development. The college, although exercising autonomy, is expected to be in harmony with other government and non-government entities in achieving economic development and social transformation of the country.

== Academics ==
=== Undergraduate Programs ===
==== College of Computer Studies (CCS) ====
- Bachelor of Science in Information Technology (BSIT)
- Bachelor of Science in Computer Science (BSCS)
- Bachelor of Library Information Science (BLIS)
- Bachelor of Science in Information Systems (BSIS)

==== College of Engineering and Architecture (CEA) ====
- Bachelor of Science in Civil Engineering (BSCE)
- Bachelor of Science in Mechanical Engineering (BSME)
- Bachelor of Science in Electronics Engineering (BSECE)
- Bachelor of Science in Electrical Engineering (BSEE)
- Bachelor of Science in Computer Engineering (BSCpE)
- Bachelor of Science in Architecture (BS Arch)

==== College of Tourism, Hospitality, and Business Management (CTHBM) ====
- Bachelor of Science in Office Administration (BSOA)
- Bachelor of Science in Hospitality Management (BSHM)
- Bachelor of Science in Entrepreneurship (BS Entrep)
- Bachelor of Science in Tourism Management (BSTM)
- Bachelor of Science in Business Administration major in Financial Management (BSBA-FM)

==== College of Health Sciences (CHS) ====
- Bachelor of Science in Nursing (BSN)
- Bachelor of Science in Midwifery (BSM)

==== College of Technological and Developmental Education (CTDE) ====
- Bachelor of Physical Education (BPEd)
- Bachelor of Culture and Arts Education (BCAEd)
- Bachelor of Special Needs Education
- Bachelor of Technological Vocational Teacher Education (BTVTEd)
  - Major In:
    - Fish Processing
    - Food Service Management
    - Electronics Technology

==== College of Arts and Sciences (CAS) ====
- Bachelor of Arts in English Language Studies
- Bachelor of Science in Mathematics
- Bachelor of Science in Applied Mathematics
- Bachelor of Science in Development Communication
- Bachelor of Science in Public Administration
- Bachelor in Human Services

=== Graduate Programs ===
- Doctor of Philosophy in Business Management
- Doctor of Philosophy in Nursing
- Doctor of Philosophy in Engineering Education
- Master of Arts in Nursing
- Master of Arts in Nursing Major in Disaster Resilience
- Master of Engineering major in:
  - Civil Engineering
  - Electrical Engineering
  - Electronics Engineering
  - Mechanical Engineering
- Master in Business Management
- Master in Information Technology
- Master in Hospitality Management
- Master in Nursing Education

== Reputation and rankings ==
Under the Commission on Higher Education SUC Levelling Instrument, CSPC is classified as a Level III State University and College (SUC), placing the institution within the higher-performing cluster of SUCs nationwide.

The majority of its academic programs are accredited by the Accrediting Agency of Chartered Colleges and Universities in the Philippines (AACCUP). As of School Year 2024-2025, distribution of program accreditation levels is as follows:

- Level IV Re-accredited: 5 programs
- Level III Re-accredited: 6 programs
- Level II Re-accredited: 4 programs
- Level I Accredited: 3 programs
- Candidate for Level I: 2 programs

In 2023, AACCUP recognized CSPC as the Top-Performing State College nationwide for having the highest number of Level IV accredited programs among state colleges in the Philippines.

The institution secured a three-star rating overall in the QS World University Rankings in 2025. Following a rigorous independent assessment, the college was rated "Good" overall.

== Student organizations ==
=== Academic organizations ===
==== College of Engineering ====
- Philippine Institute of Civil Engineers (PICE)
- Philippine Society of Mechanical Engineers (PSME)
- Institute of Electronics Engineers of the Philippines (IECEP)
- Institute of Integral Electrical Engineers (IIEE)

==== College of Health Sciences ====
- Primary Health Care Provider (PHCP)
- Philippine Nursing Student Association (PNSA)
- Red Cross Youth Council (RCYC)

==== College of Computer Studies ====
- Junior Philippine Computer Society (JPCS)

==== College of Business Management ====
- Philippine Association of Students in Office Administration (PASOA)
- Culinary and Hospitality Management Association of the Philippines (CHMAP)
- Young Entrepreneurs’ Society (YES)
- Association of Tourism Students (ATS)

==== College of Arts and Sciences ====
- Alliance of Development Communication Students (ADCS)
- League of Elite Math Enthusiasts (LEME)
- Language Studies Society (LSS)
- United League of Public Administration Students (ULPAS)
- Unified Student Association of Human Services (USAHS)

==== College of Technological and Developmental Education ====
- Association of Students in Technical Teacher Education (ASTTE)

=== Non-Academic Organizations ===
- Alliance of Music Passionate Students
- Alpha Phi Omega
- Association of Students in Environmental Awareness and Protection
- Campus Youth Ministry
- College Robotics Club
- Create Arts and Multimedia Society
- Engineering Mathematics and Science Society
- Guild for Upholding and Harnessing Indispensable Talents
- Inter-Varsity Christian Fellowship
- Tau Gamma Phi/Sigma
- Peer Counselors Organization
- Samahang Mag-aaral sa Filipino
- Samahang Magdalo Youth Movement
- Youth for Jesus (Y4J)

== Media ==
=== Institutional publications ===
CSPC produces official institutional media to document administrative, research, and community initiatives. The CSPC Gazzera serves as the official quarterly publication issued by the Office of the President, highlighting institutional developments and administrative updates. Additionally, the Research and Development Services Office publishes its newsletter, Aniningal.

=== Student journalism ===
The SPARK is the official student-community publication of the institution. Governed and managed by the student body, the publication has achieved regional distinction in collegiate journalism, securing four championships as the best-performing student publication at the Regional Tertiary Schools Press Conference (RTSPC) in the Bicol Region.

=== Broadcasting ===
The college established the CSPC Broadcast Center in 2022, introducing the first educational Digital Terrestrial Television Broadcast (DTTB) system in the Philippines. The facility also functions as a broadcast hub for two FM radio stations: FMR 94.3 FM (DWBT) and DZCC 87.5 FM.

== Research Journals ==
CSPC publishes two international, open-access, and peer-reviewed journals dedicated to the dissemination of multidisciplinary academic research. Both publications employ a double-blind peer-review process to evaluate submissions.

- Journal of Engineering and Emerging Technologies (JEET) – An annual publication focusing on original research within the fields of civil, mechanical, electrical, electronics, and computer engineering, as well as information systems and computer science. The journal also accepts multidisciplinary studies addressing engineering education, technology management, and technological development.
- Journal of Education, Management and Development Studies (JEMDS) – A quarterly journal that publishes original research papers, short reports, literature reviews, and case studies. Its scope encompasses education, agriculture, biological sciences, environmental studies, health sciences, social and behavioral sciences, public and business administration, entrepreneurship, and gender studies. The publication highlights multidisciplinary research centered on regional, national, and global sustainable development perspectives.
