= DZLQ =

Radio station in Lucena, Philippines

One FM Lucena (DZLQ)
- Lucena; Philippines
- Broadcast area: Quezon and surrounding areas
- Frequency: 98.3 MHz
- Branding: 98.3 One FM

Programming
- Language: Filipino
- Format: Contemporary MOR, OPM
- Network: One FM
- Affiliations: Radio Mindanao Network

Ownership
- Owner: Radio Corporation of the Philippines
- Sister stations: DZLT Radyo Pilipino

History
- First air date: 1977
- Former call signs: DWLQ (1977–1998)
- Call sign meaning: Lucena, Quezon

Technical information
- Licensing authority: NTC
- Power: 5 kW

98.3 One FM (DZLQ 98.3 MHz) is an FM radio station owned and operated by the Radio Corporation of the Philippines. Its studios and transmitter are located at DZLT Compound, Brgy. Ibabang Dapay, Lucena. It is one of the One FM stations affiliated with the Radio Mindanao Network.
