= Sofia Moran =

Filipino actress, singer and recording artist

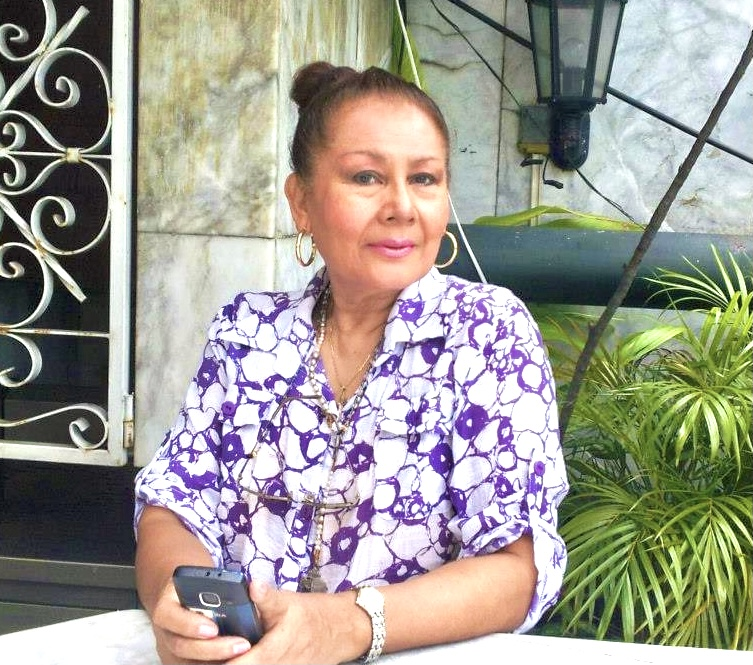
- Sofia Moran in Manila 2016
- Born: Soledad Ballon; March 11, 1940 (age 86); Nabua, Camarines Sur, Philippines
- Other names: Sol, Solly
- Occupations: Actress, Singer, Record Artist, Philanthropist
- Years active: 1967–present
- Spouse: Dante A. Magdaluyo (m. 1960; died 2019)
- Children: 3
- Website: https://sofiamoran.org/

Soledad (Sol, Solly) Ballon Magdaluyo (born March 11, 1940), better known by her screen name Sofia Moran, is a Filipina actress, singer and record artist, credited with over 60 Philippine and foreign films. The Philippine actress began her film career in the Philippines in 1967 shortly after Joseph Estrada, then the country's biggest box-office draw and action star, gave her a first break and introduced her as Sofia Moran in his major film in 1968. She was born as Soledad Ballon in Nabua, Camarines Sur.

== Career ==
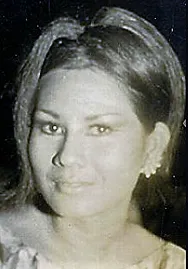
Sofia (1968) Manila, Philippines

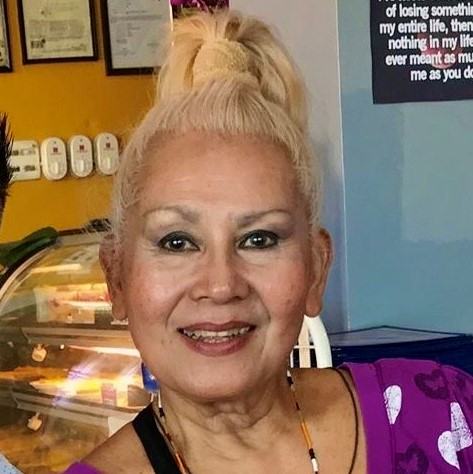
Sofia taken in her town of Nabua, Camarines Sur 2018

Sofia was immediately featured in Valiente Brothers, starring Joseph Estrada, Jess Lapid Sr., and Jun Aristorenas, the biggest action stars in the country in 1968, and famously Directed by Augusto Buenaventura.

Sofia Moran made 64 movies between 1967 and 1974 sharing the lead and starring next to leading male movie stars Joseph Estrada, Fernando Poe Jr., Tony Ferrer, Eddie Garcia, Zaldy Zshornack, Vic Vargas and Bernard Bonnin.

Sofia starred in many of the Philippines’ historical movie classics, notably Siete Infantes de Lara (1973) as Princess Gismenia, co-starred with the legendary and award-winning filmmaker, Manuel Conde.

During the 1970s up until her migration to the United States (Las Vegas), Sofia was busy with her Las Vegas-style Live performances in Manila entertainment venues, such as the legendary Victoria Peak, as well as within the islands in the Philippines, Southeast Asia and major cities in Japan (Tokyo, Osaka).

In 1971, Moran co-starred in the cult film Women in Cages with Pam Grier. It was featured in the Planet Terror portion of the 2007 film Grindhouse directed by Quentin Tarantino. In August 2007, Grindhouse Director Quentin Tarantino said of the film, "I'm a huge, huge fan of Gerry de Leon.... the film Women in Cages is just harsh, harsh, harsh," he said, and described the final shot as one of "devastating despair." Sofia generated critical international reviews from her role as Theresa in Women in Cages and was nominated as Best Actress in a Supporting Role during the 1971 Metro Manila Film Festival

Sofia Moran became known in the 1970s as one of the actors starring in films associated with both the liberation as well as exploitation of the Philippines Film Industry in scenes with daring and bold scenes such as her films in "Huwag Kang Makiapid" (1971) and "Marupok" (1970), as well as the article by Michael Flores, Bodies of Work in Philippine Cinema.

== Filmography ==
Filmography
Year	Film
1967	Alamid
1967	Pambihirang Pito
1967	Roman Montalan
1967	Pambihirang Tatlo
1967	Magnificent Bandit
1967	Kidlat Meets Gringo
1967	Eagle Commandos
1967	Buhay Marino
1967	Baril at Rosaryo
1967	Walang Hari sa Batas
1968	Valiente Brothers
1968	Tigre Gitano
1968	The Magnificent Zorro
1968	Quinto de Alas
1968	Palos Strikes Again
1968	Leon Guerrero: Laban sa 7 Kilabot
1968	Kapwa walang panginoon
1968	Giyera patani
1968	Daredevil
1968	Dambana ng Kagitingan
1968	Cuadro de Jack
1968	Agents wen Manong
1968	Magnificent Karatista
1969	Dolpe de Gulat
1969	Liquidation Squad
1969	Ang ninong kong Nazareno
1969	Seven Deadly Roses
1969	Kalinga
1969	Ronquillo Brothers
1969	Palos Fights Back!
1969	Franco Negro
1969	Musmos na mandirigma
1969	Target, Hongkong
1970	San Diego
1970	Marupok
1970	Baligtaran
1970	Pigilin mo ang Umaga
1971	Isla de Amor
1971	Arkong Bato
1971	Sophia
1971	Huwag kang makiapid
1971	Inday
1971	Castigo
1971	Playpen
1971	Ang mga Palaban
1971	Women in Cages as Theresa (uncredited)
1971	San Cristobal
1971	Sigaw ng Katarungan
1972	Batwoman and Robin as Catwoman
1972	The Smugglers
1972	Parehas ang Laban
1972	Walang impiyerno sa Matatapang
1972	Bandolera
1972	Secret Witness
1972	Los compadres
1973	Karateka Boxer
1973	I Shall Return
1973	Siete Infantes de Lara as Princesa Gismenia
1973	Kingpin
1974	No Tears for the Brave
1974	Dial 717
1974	Napahiya ka, 'No?
1974	The Magic Fighters

== Personal life ==
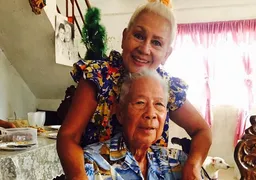
Sofia with husband, Dante

After retiring from film, Moran lived in Las Vegas, Nevada, and Atlantic City, New Jersey, with her husband, Dante A. Magdaluyo. Magdaluyo worked as a casino pit manager at Caesars Atlantic City.

Moran has homes in Nabua, Camarines Sur, Fort Lauderdale, Florida, and Las Vegas, Nevada. Her husband, Dante, died on February 24, 2019, at Santa Maria Josefa Foundation Hospital in Iriga City, Camarines Sur.

Moran is Catholic. She volunteers and supports the work of Holy Cross Catholic Church in Nabua and the Catholic Women's League in Naga City. Every year, she coordinates Nabua's annual Fiesta of Nuestra Senora de Angustia.
