= DWRN =

Radio station in Naga, Camarines Sur, Philippines

Radyo Pilipino Naga (DWRN)
- Naga; Philippines
- Broadcast area: Camarines Sur and surrounding areas
- Frequency: 657 kHz
- Branding: DWRN 657 Radyo Pilipino

Programming
- Languages: Bicolano, Filipino
- Format: News, Public Affairs, Talk
- Network: Radyo Pilipino
- Affiliations: Radio Mindanao Network

Ownership
- Owner: Radyo Pilipino Corporation; (Philippine Radio Corporation)

History
- First air date: 1983
- Former names: Radyo Asenso
- Call sign meaning: Radyo Naga

Technical information
- Licensing authority: NTC
- Class: C/D/E
- Power: 5,000 watts

DWRN (657 AM) Radyo Pilipino is a radio station owned and operated by Radyo Pilipino Corporation through its licensee Philippine Radio Corporation. The station's studio and transmitter are located along National Highway, Brgy. Del Rosario, Naga, Camarines Sur.
