= DZGE =

Defunct radio station

- Canaman; Philippines
- Broadcast area: Camarines Sur and surrounding areas
- Frequency: 855 kHz

Programming
- Format: Silent

Ownership
- Owner: Filipinas Broadcasting Network
- Sister stations: DWEB 99.9

History
- First air date: 1960
- Last air date: 2018
- Former names: Radyo Numero Uno
- Former frequencies: 840 kHz (1960–1978)
- Call sign meaning: Garantisadong Enot

Technical information
- Licensing authority: NTC

DZGE (855 AM) was a radio station owned and operated by Filipinas Broadcasting Network. It is the pioneer AM station in the province. It went off the air in 2018 due to financial issues.
