= DWXT =

Radio station in Tarlac, Philippines

One FM Tarlac (DWXT)
- Tarlac City; Philippines
- Broadcast area: Tarlac and surrounding areas
- Frequency: 96.1 MHz
- Branding: 96.1 One FM

Programming
- Languages: Kapampangan, Filipino
- Format: Contemporary MOR, OPM
- Network: One FM

Ownership
- Owner: Radio Corporation of the Philippines
- Sister stations: DZTC Radyo Pilipino; RTV Tarlac Channel 26

History
- First air date: January 1, 1981
- Call sign meaning: Extreme (former branding)

Technical information
- Licensing authority: NTC
- Power: 2,500 watts
- ERP: 5,000 watts

DWXT (96.1 FM), broadcasting as 96.1 One FM, is a radio station owned and operated by the Radio Corporation of the Philippines, a subsidiary of Radyo Pilipino. It serves as the flagship station of the One FM network. The station's studios and transmitter are located at RPMG Broadcasting Center, McArthur Highway, Brgy. San Nicolas, Tarlac City.

== Background ==
Sometime in 1980, DWXT made its test broadcast. The station started its full blast operations on January 1, 1981, under the ownership of Filipinas Broadcasting Network. Jesus Viduya served as the pioneer station manager from 1981 to 1982; Ben Arzaga would later take over the duties as station manager until 1986. During its first years of operations, DWXT had its freeform musical format sans regular disk jockeys on board. Back then, the trainees were the ones who handled the station's programming; the station's musical format varies depending on whoever he or she is on board. In 1983, Filipinas Broadcasting Network sold the station to Radio Corporation of the Philippines. In 1986, under the leadership of Bobby Barreiro together with RCP Operations Manager, Eugene Ramos, the station's sales had significantly improved. Bobbit Sanches was hired as the new program supervisor in the same year, in which he made significant changes to the station. Upon the turn of the new millennium, under the management of Francis L. Cardona, the station adopted the One FM branding and became the No. 1 radio station in Tarlac for 10 straight years.
