= DXGS-AM =

Radio station in General Santos, Philippines

Radyo Pilipino General Santos (DXGS)
- General Santos; Philippines
- Broadcast area: Soccsksargen and surrounding areas
- Frequency: 765 kHz
- Branding: DXGS 765 Radyo Pilipino

Programming
- Languages: Cebuano, Filipino
- Format: News, Public Affairs, Talk
- Network: Radyo Pilipino

Ownership
- Owner: Radyo Pilipino Corporation; (Radio Audience Developers Integrated Organization, Inc.)

History
- First air date: 1965
- Former frequencies: 750 kHz (1965–1978)
- Call sign meaning: General Santos

Technical information
- Licensing authority: NTC
- Power: 5,000 watts

DXGS (765 AM) Radyo Pilipino is a radio station owned and operated by Radyo Pilipino Corporation through its licensee Radio Audience Developers Integrated Organization (RADIO), Inc. The station's studio is located in Brgy. Lagao, General Santos.

Established in 1965, DXGS is the pioneer station in the city. It was formerly owned by Filipinas Broadcasting Network until 1983, when it was among the stations sold to RadioCorp.
