= DWPR =

Radio station in Dagupan, Philippines

Radyo Pilipino Dagupan (DWPR)
- Dagupan; Philippines
- Broadcast area: Pangasinan and surrounding areas
- Frequency: 1296 kHz
- Branding: DWPR 1296 Radyo Pilipino

Programming
- Languages: Pangasinense, Filipino
- Format: News, Public Affairs, Talk
- Network: Radyo Pilipino
- Affiliations: Radio Mindanao Network

Ownership
- Owner: Radyo Pilipino Corporation; (Beacon Communications System, Inc.)

History
- First air date: 1973
- Former frequencies: 1300 kHz (1973–1978)
- Call sign meaning: Pangasinan Radio

Technical information
- Licensing authority: NTC
- Power: 10,000 watts

DWPR (1296 AM) Radyo Pilipino is a radio station owned and operated by Radyo Pilipino Corporation through its licensee Beacon Communications System, Inc. The station's studio is located along Gonzales St., Brgy. Bonuan Boquig, Dagupan, and its transmitter is located in Brgy. Bolosan, Dagupan.

It was formerly owned by Allied Broadcasting Center from its inauguration until 1983, when the Radio Corporation of the Philippines acquired the station. It is one of the few Radyo Pilipino stations affiliated with the Radio Mindanao Network.
