= DYCJ =

Radio station in Tacloban, Philippines

One FM Tacloban (DYCJ)
Tacloban; Philippines
- Broadcast area: Leyte
- Frequency: 96.7 MHz
- Branding: 96.7 One FM

Programming
- Languages: Waray, Filipino
- Format: Contemporary MOR, OPM
- Network: One FM

Ownership
- Owner: Radio Corporation of the Philippines

History
- First air date: 2015

Technical information
- Licensing authority: NTC
- Power: 1 kW
- ERP: 5 kW

Links
- Website: www.onefm.ph

96.7 One FM (DYCJ 96.7 MHz) is an FM station owned and operated by Radio Corporation of the Philippines. Its studios and transmitter are located at Lower Nula Tula, Tacloban.
