= DXSP =

Radio station in Surigao City, Philippines

One FM Surigao (DXSP)
- Surigao City; Philippines
- Broadcast area: Surigao del Norte, Dinagat Islands and surrounding areas
- Frequency: 96.1 MHz
- Branding: 96.1 One FM

Programming
- Languages: Surigaonon, Filipino
- Format: Contemporary MOR, OPM
- Network: One FM

Ownership
- Owner: Radyo Pilipino Corporation

History
- First air date: April 2009
- Call sign meaning: Surigao Province

Technical information
- Licensing authority: NTC
- Power: 5,000 watts

DXSP (96.1 FM), on-air as 96.1 One FM, is a radio station owned and operated by the Radio Corporation of the Philippines (now Radyo Pilipino Corporation). The station's studio and transmitter are located at the 4/F Yuipco Bldg., Navarro St., Brgy. Taft, Surigao City.

== History ==
On March 11, 2014, a fire in the building the station was located in damaged the station's equipment, its 2 transmitters and studio. Since then, One FM remained off-air until 2017, when it went back on air.
