= DWRL =

Radio station in Legazpi, Philippines

Radyo Pilipino Legaspi (DWRL)
- Legazpi; Philippines
- Broadcast area: Albay and surrounding areas
- Frequency: 1080 kHz
- Branding: DWRL 1080 Radyo Pilipino

Programming
- Languages: Albayanon, Filipino
- Format: News, Public Affairs, Talk
- Network: Radyo Pilipino

Ownership
- Owner: Radio Corporation of the Philippines; (Radio Audience Developers Integrated Organization, Inc.)
- Sister stations: 88.3 One FM

History
- First air date: 1980 (in Batangas); June 12, 1983 (in Albay)
- Former call signs: DZBT (1980–1983)
- Former names: Radyo Asenso
- Call sign meaning: Radyo Legaspi

Technical information
- Licensing authority: NTC
- Class: CDE
- Power: 5,000 watts
- ERP: 5,000 watts

DWRL (1080 AM) Radyo Pilipino is a radio station owned and operated by the Radio Corporation of the Philippines through its licensee Radio Audience Developers Integrated Organization (RADIO), Inc. The station's studio is located at Purok 5, Brgy. Rawis, Legazpi, Albay.

== History ==
DWRL was inaugurated in 1980 as DZBT, with studios located in Batangas City. In 1983, it moved to Legazpi City. On June 12, 1983, it went on the air at the PNR Legazpi Terminal. In November 2006, its transmitter was destroyed by Typhoon Reming. In January 2007, DWRL moved to its current home in Brgy. Rawis. By 2020, all of RadioCorp's stations carry the Radyo Pilipino branding.
