= DYRL-AM =

Radio station in Bacolod, Philippines

Radyo Pilipino Bacolod (DYRL)
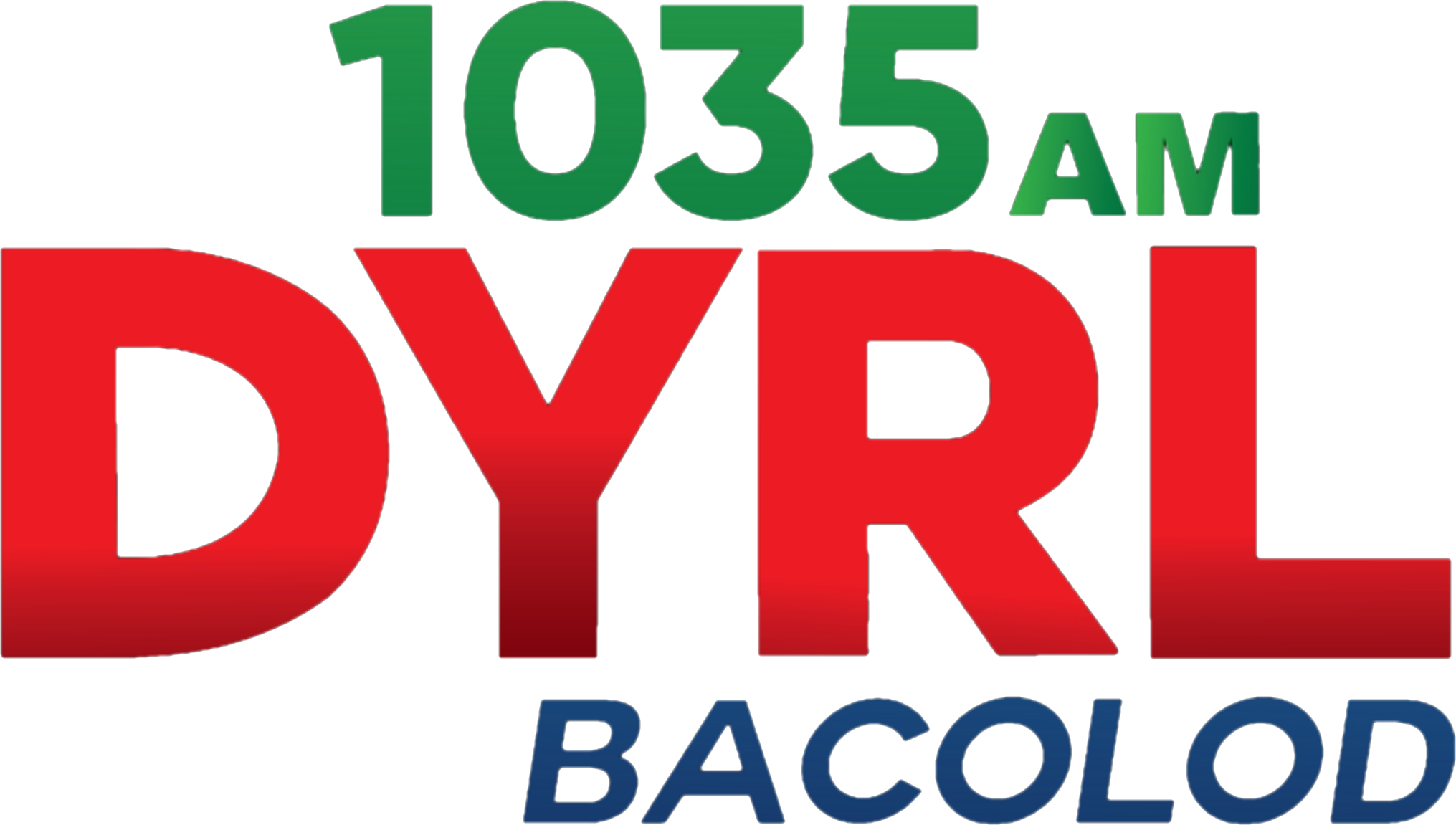

Bacolod; Philippines
- Broadcast area: Northern Negros Occidental and surrounding areas
- Frequency: 1035 kHz (C-QUAM)
- Branding: DYRL 1035 Radyo Pilipino

Programming
- Languages: Hiligaynon, Filipino
- Format: News, Public Affairs, Talk
- Network: Radyo Pilipino

Ownership
- Owner: Radyo Pilipino Corporation

History
- First air date: 1956
- Former names: Abyan Radyo
- Former frequencies: 990 kHz (1956–1978)
- Call sign meaning: Ricardo Lopez (Original owner)

Technical information
- Licensing authority: NTC
- Power: 10,000 watts

DYRL (1035 AM) Radyo Pilipino is a radio station owned and operated by Radyo Pilipino Corporation. Its studio and transmitter are located along Cameroli Ave., Brgy. Rodriguez Baybay, Bacolod.
