= DYRM =

Radio station in Dumaguete, Philippines

Radyo Pilipino Dumaguete (DYRM)
Dumaguete; Philippines
- Broadcast area: Southern Negros Oriental and surrounding areas
- Frequency: 1134 kHz
- Branding: DYRM 1134 Radyo Pilipino

Programming
- Languages: Cebuano, Filipino
- Format: News, Public Affairs, Talk
- Network: Radyo Pilipino

Ownership
- Owner: Radyo Pilipino Corporation; (Philippine Radio Corporation)

History
- First air date: 1959
- Former names: Radyo Asenso
- Former frequencies: 1120 kHz (1959–1978)
- Call sign meaning: Ramon Magsaysay

Technical information
- Licensing authority: NTC
- Class: C, D, E
- Power: 1,000 watts
- ERP: 5,000 watts

DYRM (1134 AM) Radyo Pilipino is a radio station owned and operated by Radyo Pilipino Corporation through its licensee Philippine Radio Corporation. Its studios and transmitter are located at Brgy. Calindagan, Dumaguete. DYRM is the pioneer AM station in Negros Oriental.

It was formerly owned by Allied Broadcasting Center from its inauguration until 1983, when the Radio Corporation of the Philippines acquired the station. Based on a survey conducted by Kantar in early 2017, it is ranked #2 most listened to AM station.
