= DZYM-AM =

Philippine radio station

Radyo Pilipino Mindoro (DZYM)
- San Jose; Philippines
- Broadcast area: Southern Mindoro
- Frequency: 1539 kHz
- Branding: DZYM 1539 Radyo Pilipino

Programming
- Language: Filipino
- Format: News, Public Affairs, Talk
- Network: Radyo Pilipino

Ownership
- Owner: Radyo Pilipino Corporation; (Philippine Radio Corporation)
- Sister stations: 92.1 One FM

History
- First air date: 1970
- Former frequencies: 1320 kHz (1970–1978)

Technical information
- Licensing authority: NTC
- Power: 5,000 watts
- ERP: 10,000 watts

DZYM (1539 AM) Radyo Pilipino is a radio station owned and operated by Radyo Pilipino Corporation through its licensee Philippine Radio Corporation. The station's studio and transmitter are located along Felix Y. Manalo Ave., Brgy. Pag-asa, San Jose, Occidental Mindoro.
