= DZYM-FM =

One FM Mindoro (DZYM)
San Jose; Philippines
- Broadcast area: Southern Mindoro
- Frequency: 92.1 MHz
- Branding: 92.1 One FM

Programming
- Language: Filipino
- Format: Contemporary MOR, OPM
- Network: One FM

Ownership
- Owner: Radio Corporation of the Philippines
- Sister stations: DZYM Radyo Pilipino

History
- First air date: 2017

Technical information
- Licensing authority: NTC
- Power: 5 kW

Links
- Website: www.onefm.ph

92.1 One FM (DZYM 92.1 MHz) is an FM station owned and operated by Radio Corporation of the Philippines. Its studios and transmitter are located along Felix Y. Manalo Ave., Brgy. Pag-asa, San Jose, Occidental Mindoro.
