= DZLT-AM =

Radyo Pilipino Lucena (DZLT)
- Lucena; Philippines
- Broadcast area: Southern Luzon and surrounding areas
- Frequency: 1188 kHz
- Branding: DZLT 1188 Radyo Pilipino

Programming
- Language: Filipino
- Format: News, Public Affairs, Talk
- Network: Radyo Pilipino
- Affiliations: Radio Mindanao Network

Ownership
- Owner: Radio Corporation of the Philippines
- Sister stations: 98.3 One FM

History
- First air date: 1960
- Former names: Radyo Asenso
- Former frequencies: 1150 kHz (1960–1978)
- Call sign meaning: Lucena and Tayabas

Technical information
- Licensing authority: NTC
- Power: 10,000 watts

DZLT (1188 AM) Radyo Pilipino is a radio station owned and operated by the Radio Corporation of the Philippines. Its studio and transmitter are located in Brgy. Ibabang Dupay, Lucena. It has the distinction of being the oldest radio station in southern Luzon and is one of the few Radyo Pilipino stations affiliated with Radio Mindanao Network.

DZLT's transmitter was knocked down twice by typhoons: the most recent one by Typhoon Xangsane (Milenyo) in 2006.
