= DWRC-FM =

Radio station in Legazpi, Philippines

Sigaw Music & News FM (DWRC)
- Legazpi; Philippines
- Broadcast area: Albay and surrounding areas
- Frequency: 95.5 MHz
- Branding: Sigaw 95.5 Music & News FM

Programming
- Languages: Albayanon, Filipino
- Format: Contemporary MOR, News, Talk

Ownership
- Owner: Filipinas Broadcasting Network
- Sister stations: DZRC

History
- First air date: 1980
- Former names: Power 95 (1980–1991); WRC FM (1991–1998); Radio City (1998–2017)
- Call sign meaning: Radio City (former branding)

Technical information
- Licensing authority: NTC
- Power: 5,000 watts

DWRC (95.5 FM), broadcasting as Sigaw 95.5 Music & News FM, is a radio station owned and operated by Filipinas Broadcasting Network. Its studio and transmitter are located along Capt. F. Aquende Dr., Brgy. Bagumbayan, Legazpi, Albay.
