= Nabua =

Municipality in Camarines Sur, Philippines

- Municipality
- Municipality of Nabua
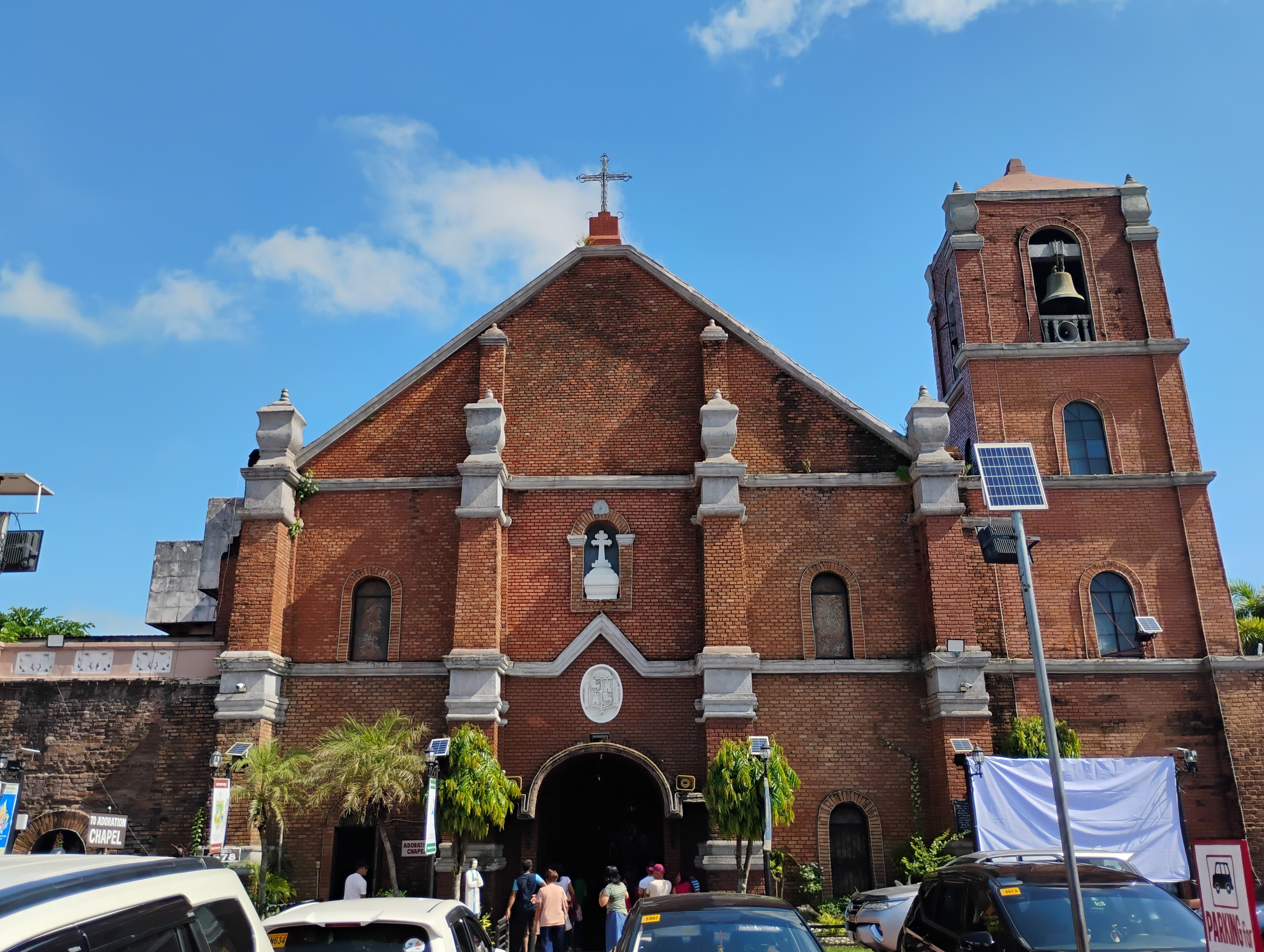
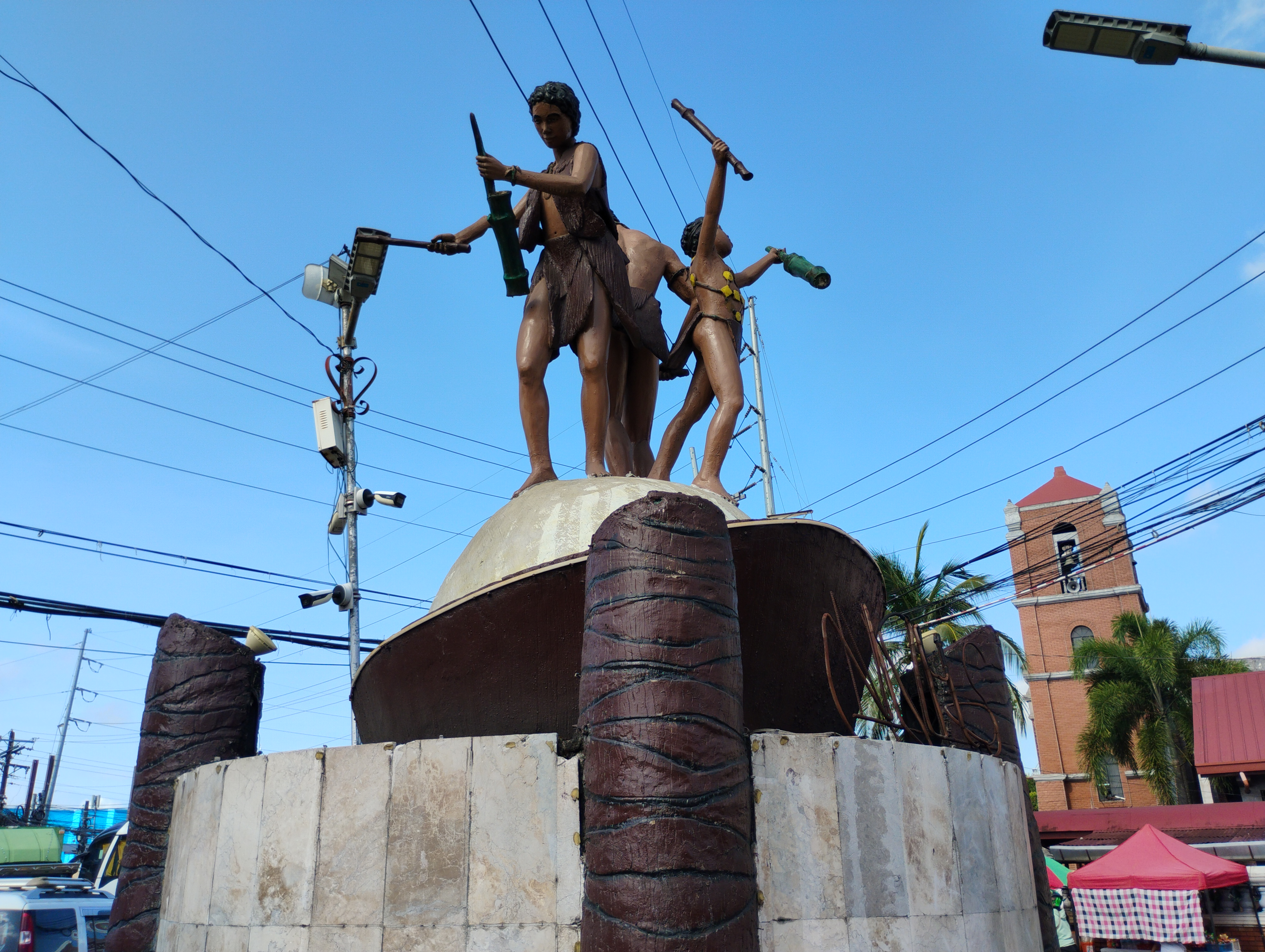
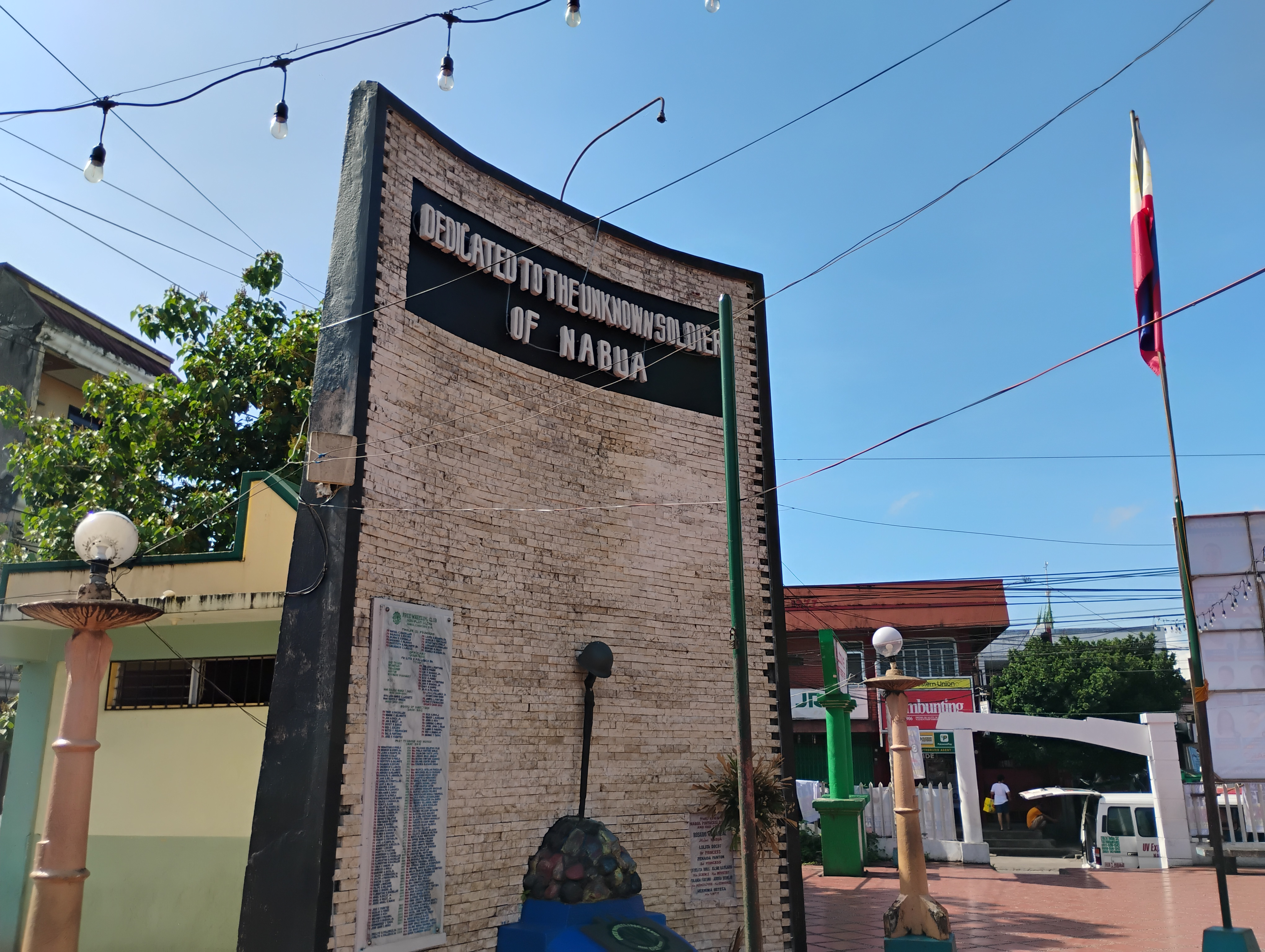
- Holy Cross Church Boa-boahan Monument Nabua Veterans Park

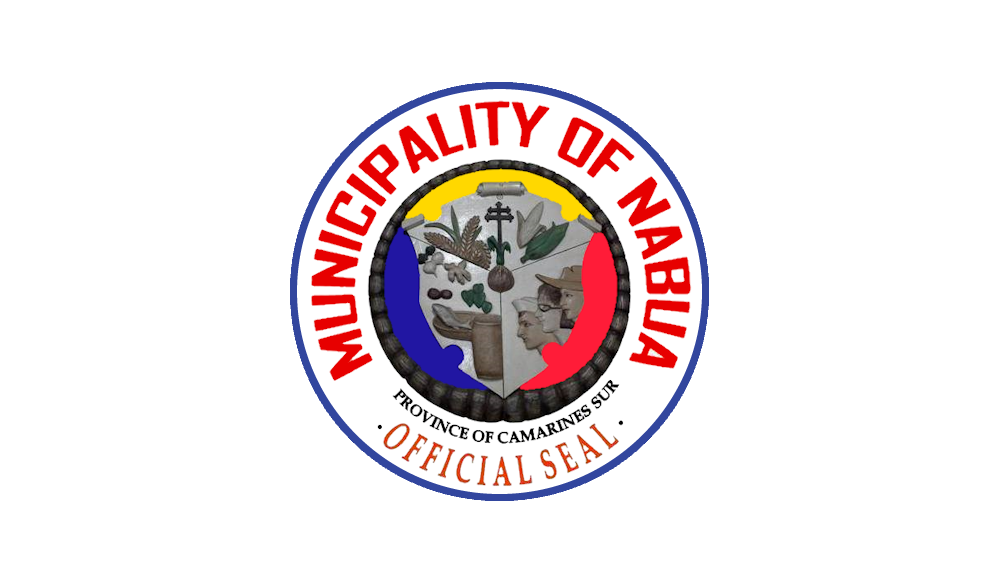
- Flag Seal
- Motto: Abante Nabua, Abante!
- Map of Camarines Sur with Nabua highlighted
- Interactive map of Nabua
- Location within the Philippines
- Coordinates: 13°24′28″N 123°22′23″E
- Country: Philippines
- Region: Bicol Region
- Province: Camarines Sur
- District: 5th district
- Founded: July 25, 1569
- Barangays: 42 (see Barangays)

Government
  - Type: Sangguniang Bayan
  - Mayor: Fernando D. Simbulan
  - Vice Mayor: Gerard S. Ponon
  - Representative: Miguel Luis R. Villafuerte
  - Municipal Council: Members: Maria Eleanor O. Luzon; Ferozza Delia C. Simbulan; Jeph G. Llanza; Alden J. Gallarte; Joselito F. Figuracion; Alvin A. Bellen; Ruben G. Bearis III; Ulpiano P. Duran Jr.
  - Electorate: 55,549 voters (2025)

Area
  - Total: 96.20 km^{2} (37.14 sq mi)
- Elevation: 16 m (52 ft)
- Highest elevation: 112 m (367 ft)
- Lowest elevation: 4 m (13 ft)

Population (2024 census)
  - Total: 86,458
  - Density: 898.7/km^{2} (2,328/sq mi)
  - Households: 18,313
- Demonym: Nabueño

Economy
  - Income class: 1st municipal income class
  - Poverty incidence: 22.1% (2023)
  - Revenue: ₱ 396.5 million (2024)
  - Assets: ₱ 949.1 million (2024)
  - Expenditure: ₱ 388.1 million (2024)
  - Liabilities: ₱ 270.1 million (2024)

Service provider
  - Electricity: Camarines Sur 3 Electric Cooperative (CASURECO 3)
  - Water: Nabua Water District
  - Telecommunications: Smart Telecommunications; Globe Telecommunications
  - Cable TV: Vision Prime Cable
  - Satellite Cable TV Providers: Cignal TV; Sky Cable
  - Radio Stations: DWEB FM 99.9; DWVF CSPC Radio 87.5
- Time zone: UTC+8 (PST)
- ZIP code: 4434
- PSGC: 0501723000
- IDD : area code: +63 (0)54
- Native languages: Rinconada Bikol; Central Bikol; Tagalog

Nabua, officially the Municipality of Nabua (Rinconada Bikol: Banwāan ka Nabua; Tagalog: Bayan ng Nabua), is a municipality in the province of Camarines Sur, Philippines. According to the 2024 census, it has a population of 86,458 people.

The town is recognized as the birthplace of modern kuntaw and jota rojana. The municipality is also known for its large coconut plantations, which support its local agriculture and economy. Additionally, it is acknowledged as the mother town of Iriga City, Buhi, Bato, Balatan, Bula, and Baao.

== Etymology ==
The municipality of Nabua traces the historical origin of its name way back during the Spanish colonial era. It was said that in 1571, an Augustinian friar named Alonzo Gimenez reached one of the rancherías called "Lupa" which was then under Datu Panga from Borneo. The good friar found persons inside the said rancheria cutting coconuts. He was offered to partake the inside shoot of coconut which the natives called “boa." Immediately, Fray Alonzo tagged the place as “Nabua” pronounced with his Spanish accent. The place is said to have been popularly known as "Nabua" since then.

In another version, the historian Fray Felix Huerta claimed that the name came from the story that the original sitio of the town was in the shape of a young coconut embryo surrounded by five rancherias named Lupa, Antacodos, Sabang, Caobnan, and Binoyoan. Others believed otherwise and said it was centrally located in the middle of said rancherias, thus closely resembling "boa." For a time, the town was called “Nabobowa" but years of long usage shortened and corrupted it to the present name.

== History ==
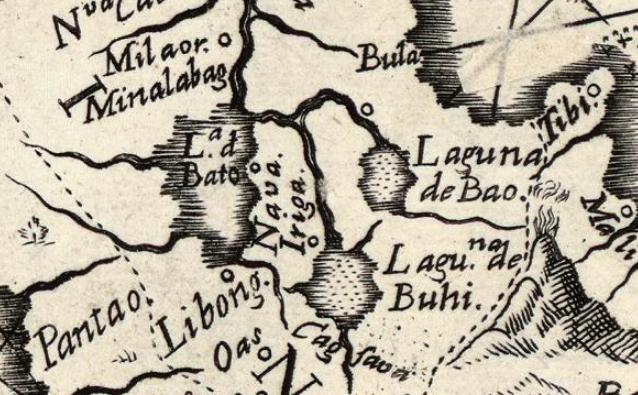
Early map showing the town of "Nava" and surrounding towns of present-day Rinconada area

In 1578, a group of Franciscan missionaries led by Fray Pablo de Jesus and Fray Bartolome Ruiz put up a church in Antacodos where they placed a big cross. These missionaries soon merged the villages of Lupa, Antacodos, Sabang, and Binoyoan into one place.

In a research mission to Spain funded by the municipality, it was learned that Nabua was officially established as a municipality on July 25, 1569.

Based on the 1734 Murillo Velarde map, one of the earliest cartographic maps of the Philippine archipelago, the town is identified as "Nava"—a Spanish name indicating a "level piece of ground." This is probably the apt description of the place at that time, and until the present time, a flat terrain stretching from the shores of the lakes of Bato and Baao and nestled in the plains between Mt. Asog and the mountains of Bula and the then Pantao.

The 1818 census showed the area had 2,612 native families and 2 Spanish-Filipino families.

== Geography ==
The municipality of Nabua ranges approximately 123.25–123.39° east longitude and 13.35–13.42° north latitude. It is bounded on the north by the municipality of Baao and Bula; on the south by the municipality of Bato; on the east by Iriga City; and on the west by the municipality of Balatan. The municipality is an established growth center in the southeast part of Camarines Sur or the midsection of Bicol River Basin Area. It is located along the Legazpi–Iriga–Naga–Daet Growth Corridor or LINDGC. Nabua is 20 kilometres (12 mi) from Pili and 470 kilometres (290 mi) from Manila.

=== Climate ===
Climate data for Nabua, Camarines Sur
Month	Jan	Feb	Mar	Apr	May	Jun	Jul	Aug	Sep	Oct	Nov	Dec	Year
Mean daily maximum °C (°F)	33 (91)	32 (90)	35 (95)	37 (99)	37 (99)	36 (97)	35 (95)	33 (91)	35 (95)	34 (93)	33 (91)	32 (90)	34 (94)
Mean daily minimum °C (°F)	26 (79)	26 (79)	28 (82)	30 (86)	31 (88)	31 (88)	29 (84)	28 (82)	29 (84)	28 (82)	28 (82)	27 (81)	28 (83)
Average precipitation mm (inches)	51.03 (2.01)	78.13 (3.08)	55.3 (2.18)	83.07 (3.27)	159.34 (6.27)	239.88 (9.44)	385.80 (15.19)	391.75 (15.42)	293.65 (11.56)	401.33 (15.80)	108.2 (4.26)	334.9 (13.19)	2,582.38 (101.67)
Average rainy days	21	24	19	20	25	29	31	29	29	29	27	30	313
Source: World Weather Online

The municipality of Nabua possesses a climate belonging to the 4th type wherein rainfalls are more or less evenly distributed throughout the years. Its rainfall is classified as Type B or humid which is characterized by rains well or evenly distributed throughout the year with at most three dry months. General wind direction prevailing the municipality is from northeast to southwest at an average velocity of eight knots.

The municipality has a dry, a cold, and a wet season. From June to November, the town experiences heavy rains. The cold season comes every December to February. Then, from March to May, the dry season commences.

=== Land ===
The municipality of Nabua is one land mass containing a total land area of 8,854.4193 hectares. This total land area distributed among the 42 barangays, nine of which are considered as urban barangays, namely, San Antonio (Poblacion), San Esteban, San Francisco, San Juan, San Luis, San Isidro, San Miguel, San Nicolas, San Roque (Poblacion) and 33 are considered as rural barangays. Among the urban barangays, San Antonio (Poblacion) has the biggest land area of 234.1798 hectares while San Luis has the least land area of 2.1746 hectares. In the rural barangays, La Purisima has the largest land area as well as in the entire municipality of 428.1501 hectares while San Roque Madawon has the smallest land area of 76.3228 hectares.

The municipality of Nabua given its land mass is entirely classified as alienable and disposable lands. Previous land classification has its slight share of forestland but was absorbed by the adjacent municipality of Balatan which requires political solution.

=== Elevation and slope ===
Nabua has about 8,803.0600 hectares or 99.42% very low elevation or less than 100 meters elevation and remaining 51.3593 hectares or 0.58% of low elevation or between 100 and 300 meters elevation. Its slope covers about 7,927.3616 hectares or 89.53% which are level to nearly level (0-3%) while the remaining 927.0577 hectares or 10.47% are rolling to moderately steep (18-30%)

As the dominantly alluvial plain, the municipality of Nabua has the prevalent soil types classified as either clay loam or sandy loam having silty texture. These soil types are very favorable for agricultural usage.

The geological characteristics for Nabua consist of: Upper Pleistocene (Sandstone and shale), Pliocene Pleistocene (Volcanoclast alluvial fans), and Recent (Alluvium or rice terraces).

The natural drainage tributaries for Nabua consist of numerous creeks interconnected with the three major rivers namely: Bicol River, Waras River, and Barit River.

=== Barangays ===
Nabua is politically subdivided into 42 barangays. Each barangay consists of puroks and some have sitios. Nabua has five districts: Antacudos, Binoyoan, Caobnan, Lupa and Sabang.

- Angustia (Angustia Inapatan)
- Antipolo Old
- Antipolo Young
- Aro-aldao
- Bustrac
- Inapatan (Del Rosario Inapatan)
- Dolorosa (Dolorosa Inapatan)
- Duran (Jesus Duran)
- La Purisima (Agupit)
- Lourdes Old
- Lourdes Young
- La Opinion
- Paloyon Oriental
- Paloyon Proper (Sagrada Paloyon)
- Salvacion Que Gatos
- San Antonio (Poblacion)
- San Antonio Ogbon
- San Esteban (Poblacion)
- San Francisco (Poblacion)
- San Isidro (Poblacion)
- San Isidro Inapatan
- Malawag (San Jose Malawag)
- San Jose (San Jose Pangaraon)
- San Juan (Poblacion)
- San Luis (Poblacion)
- San Miguel (Poblacion)
- San Nicolas (Poblacion)
- San Roque (Poblacion)
- San Roque Madawon
- San Roque Sagumay
- San Vicente Gorong-Gorong
- San Vicente Ogbon
- Santa Barbara (Maliban)
- Santa Cruz
- Santa Elena Baras
- Santa Lucia
- Santiago Old
- Santiago Young
- Santo Domingo
- Tandaay
- Topas Proper
- Topas Sogod

== Demographics ==
Population census of Nabua
Year	Pop.	±% p.a.
1903	18,893	—
1918	19,314	+0.15%
1939	29,433	+2.03%
1948	42,946	+4.29%
1960	66,657	+3.73%
1970	44,417	−3.97%
1975	48,635	+1.84%
1980	53,295	+1.85%
1990	60,885	+1.34%
1995	65,988	+1.52%
2000	70,909	+1.55%
2007	75,422	+0.85%
2010	80,111	+2.22%
2015	83,874	+0.88%
2020	86,490	+0.65%
2024	86,458	−0.01%
Source: Philippine Statistics Authority

In the 2024 census, the population of Nabua was 86,458 people, with a density of 900 inhabitants per square kilometre or 2,300 inhabitants per square mile.

The municipality's total population accounts for 4.3% of the total provincial population of Camarines Sur, ranking sixth behind much larger population sizes of Naga City, Iriga, Libmanan, Pili and Calabanga.

Historically, the municipal population has experienced positive growth rate, beginning in Censal Year 1903 up to 1999. Municipal population records show only one exception in Censal Year 1970 where the municipal population decreased. This population shift in number can be attributed to migration patterns due to socio-economic reasons. Thus, from a mere population size of 18,893 in 1903, the current municipal population more than tripled in size for 1999.

Spread out among the 42 barangays of Nabua, there are 10,093 persons living in the urban barangays while 65,329 persons live in the rural barangays. Among urban barangays, San Antonio Poblacion has the largest population with 2,363 persons while San Luis has the smallest with 358 persons. For rural barangays, La Purisima has the largest population with 8,165 persons while Salvacion Que Gatos has the lowest with a population of 523 persons.

=== Religion ===
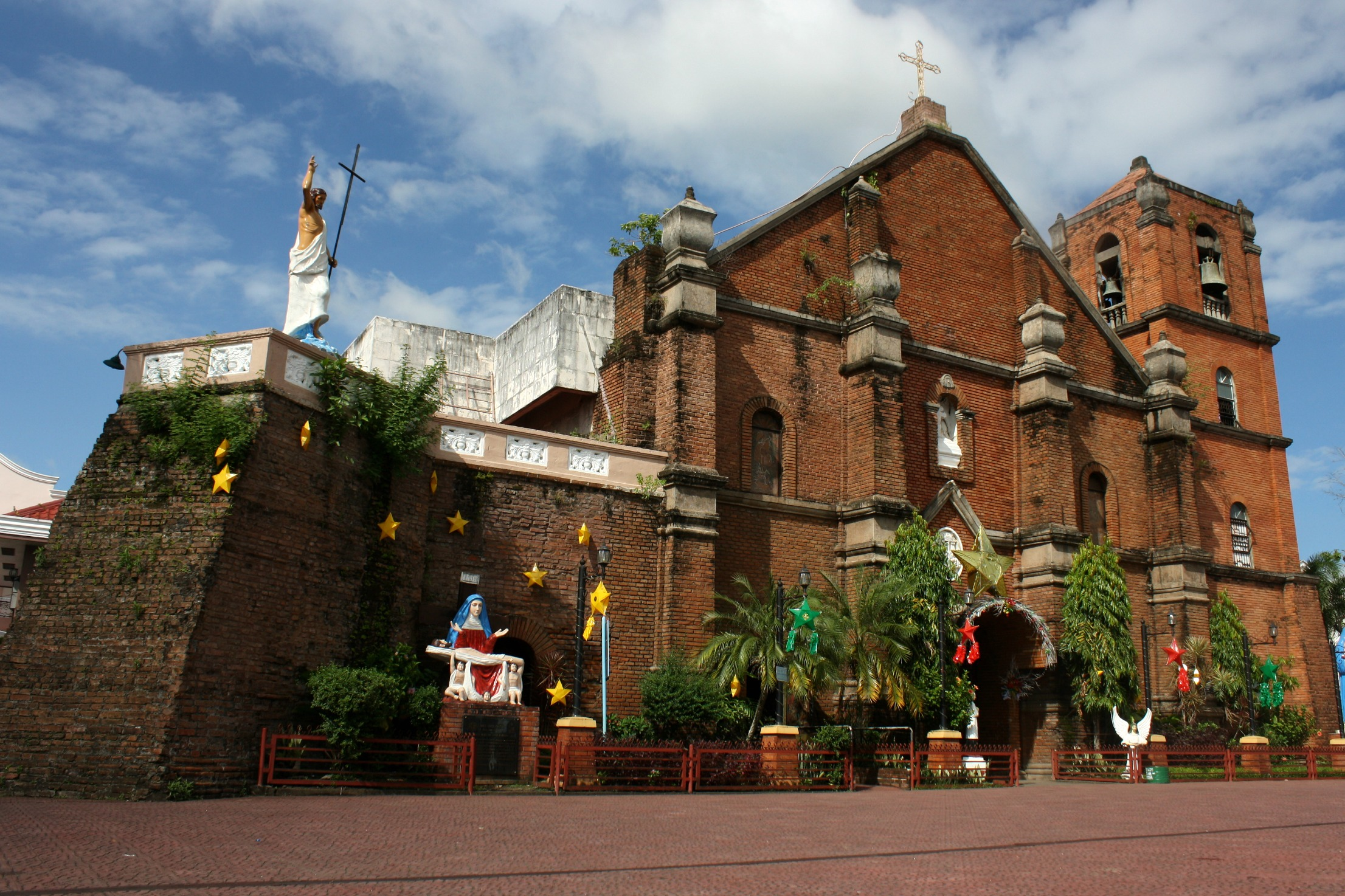
Parish of the Holy Cross Church

Many Nabueños are followers of Catholicism which is apparent in several barangays bearing the names of Catholic patron saints. However, culture, festivals and practices are of mixed Catholic and local beliefs of Bicolanos of the pre-Spanish period. Iglesia ni Cristo is the largest minority religion with several local congregations in the municipality and is growing rapidly.

=== Language ===
The Nabua-Balatan variant under lowland dialect (sinaranəw) of Rinconada Bikol can be considered having its base from the Bikol languages. However, there are other smaller social groups within the Bicol region where Nabua derives the foundation of its variant. The Rinconada area composed of Baao, Buhi, Bula, Balatan, Bato, Nabua and Iriga shares the same Rinconada Bikol language that the local folks are still enriching up to this day. The Nabua-Balatan variant can be easily recognized by the way they enunciate words or phrases when they talk or use the language. For being the mother town of all the municipalities and city in Rinconada area, the Nabua-Balatan variant is considered by linguistics as one of the foundation variants of Rinconada Bikol language.

Additionally, Spanish influences are frequently encountered in the languages of Nabuenos. Some examples of Spanish words embedded in the local dialect are: “Abreyā raw iton puertan.” This is a command statement, meaning “Open the door” in English or “Buksan ang pintuan” in the Filipino language. The word “abreyā” is an inflection of the Spanish verb “abrir” (to open), and “puertan” is a shorten word of "puertāhan" which is from the Spanish word “puerta”.

Other variations of Spanish words being used in the Nabua-Balatan variant can be found, but many of these words or terms due to usage over time do not follow proper Spanish language conjugations and grammar.

== Culture ==
Nabua has a rich array of customs and colorful practices that are found up to the present day.

=== Pangarana ===
This is the Nabua version of “serenading”. When a man wants to show his intent to court a woman, the man (sometimes accompanied by his friends) armed with a guitar or possibly a karaoke machine shows up on the woman’s doorsteps unannounced late at night. The woman or her family have either the option to turn on the lights and acknowledge the serenaders or just ignore them. In some cases, the event turns into an unforgettable event as the woman’s family may come up with some unique ways to get the serenaders out of their property, such as throwing a bucketful of hot water or unleashing “bantay”, the household watch dog.

=== Pa-aurora ===
The local folks are religious in nature so it is common for them to make a religious promise or ‘panata’ expressing their exultation to God because of a bountiful harvest or they have a petition that they wish would be granted. This is manifested through the local practice of “Aurora”. On nine consecutive nights, they would decorate an improvised "carroza" for their local patron saint and then visit the households in the neighborhood with singing and prayers.

=== Pista sa mga Kalag ===
On November 1, nearly all citizens take a trip down to the cemetery. This is their practice of honoring and remembering departed loved ones. They would offer flowers and light candles in their tombstones, sarcophagus, or decorate the family mausoleum with flowers and food. The local cemetery comes alive the night of November 1 to commemorate All Saints Day until the early morning of November 2 for All Souls Day. Masses at the cemetery are often offered on both days.

=== Tang-gal kin Cuaresma ===
During the season of Lent, some of the prominent families in Nabua will sponsor a “Tang-gal”. Tang-gal is the re-enactment of Jesus Christ’s Passion and Death on the cross. After the passion of Christ is re-enacted, the “tang-gal” is concluded with “Ire-Helena”, the story of Helene and Constantine in search of the True Cross.

=== Pag-li-li ===
When a family member or loved one dies, the family, friends and relatives of the dead offer nine days of prayers. This is the nine days of mourning where they go to the local church to attend Mass and then continue their novena prayers at the house of the deceased. Prayers are offered to help the soul of the deceased rest in peace and at the same time to console the grieving family.

=== Katapusan ===
After forty days of mourning, the family, friends and relatives of the dead celebrate the passage by hosting a feast and invite all those who consoled them in their time of grief. Once everyone invited are gathered, they say the litanies and pray the Rosary of the Most Blessed Virgin Mary. Local folks believe that the soul of their dead have now passed the stage of “roaming” and ready to rest in eternal peace. This is the time to let go and as a symbolism, they can now wear other colors of clothing instead of the traditional all black or all white.

=== Dotoc ===
Before the baranggay fiesta, "Dotoc" is a custom of Nabueños in honoring their patron saint through nine nights of thanksgiving.

=== Segunda Dia ===
The day after fiesta. It is a dance extravaganza played with folk, country, and novelty songs that the married couples, widows, widower and senior citizens dance in a dance floor. This make more fun and recreation for them especially for the balikbayans, or overseas locals, that will remember the steps of Codot-codotan.

== Economy ==
Poverty incidence of Nabua (%)

Source: Philippine Statistics Authority

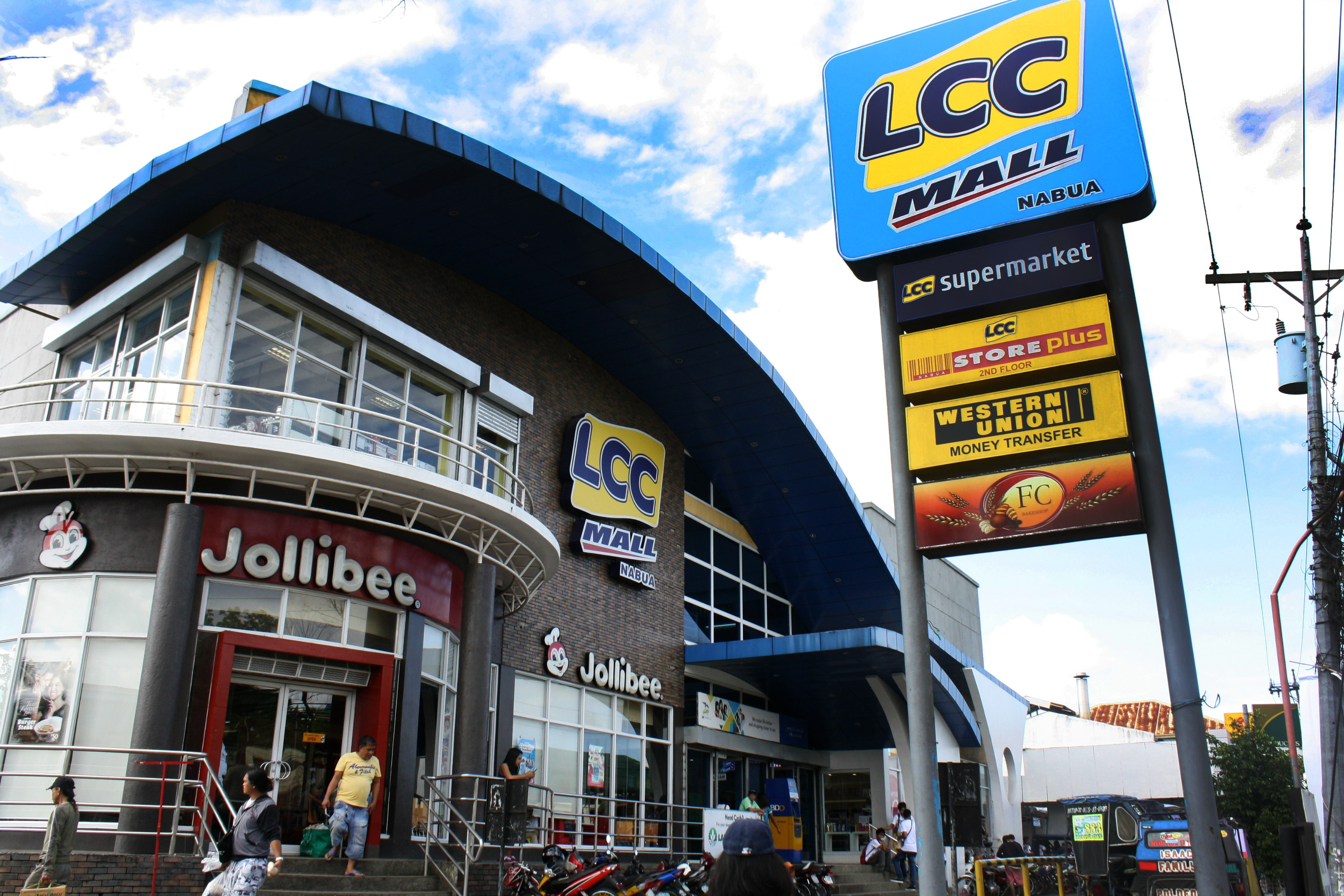
LCC Nabua is the largest commercial establishment in the municipality

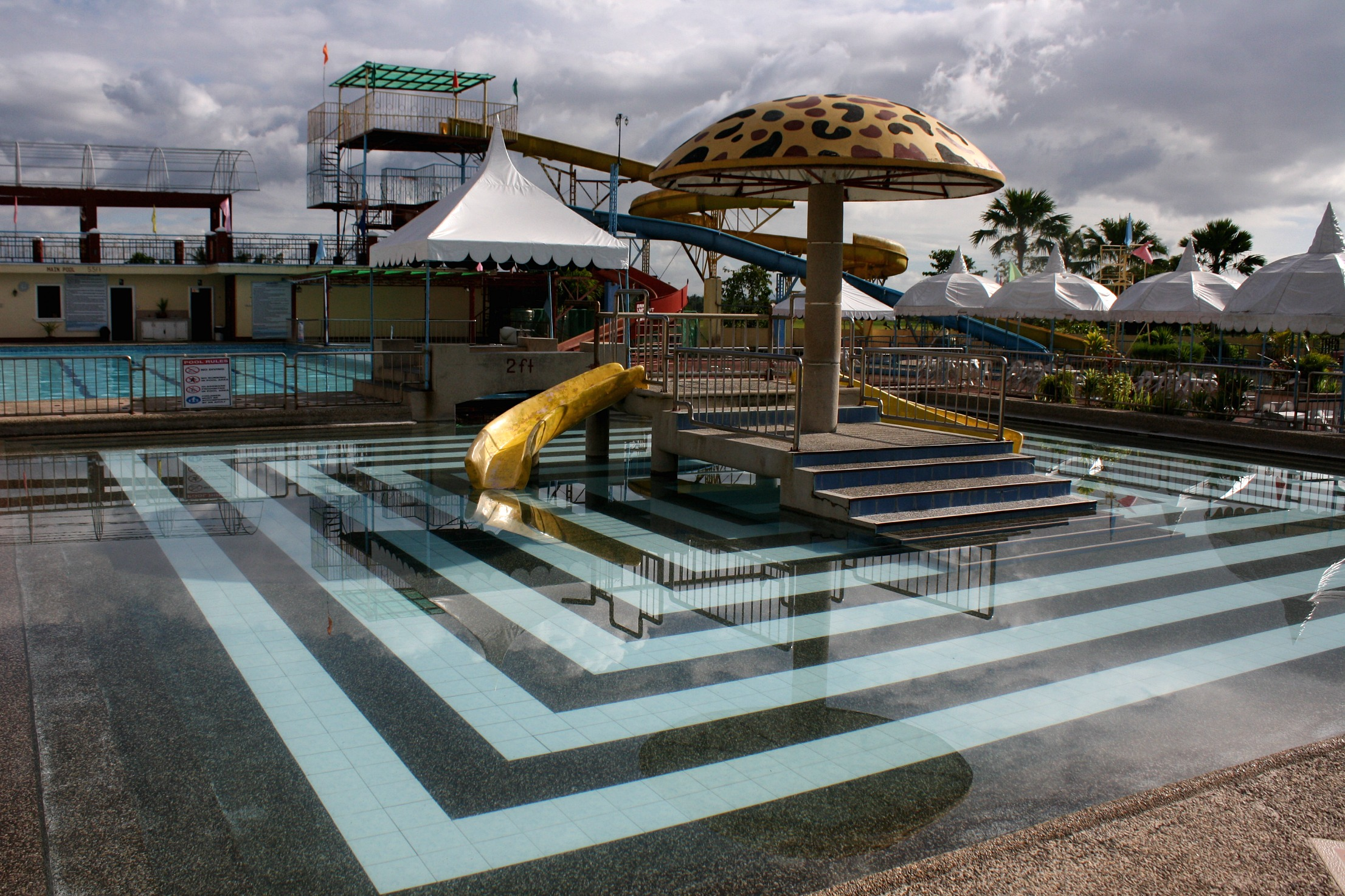
Macagang offers accommodation and recreational facilities

Nabua used to be the center of economic development in Bicol just behind Legazpi City and Naga City throughout the 19th and 20th century. During the late 1990s and early 2000s most development went to the cities and municipalities of Tabaco, Iriga, Masbate City, Sorsogon City, Bulan, Ligao, Polangui, Goa, Pili and Sipocot then leaving behind Nabua as a residential area.

However, driven by its extensive agricultural lands and the Bicol River along its western edge, Nabua was viewed as a rising commercial center of the Bicol Region in 2006, earning it a reclassification as a first-class municipality in 2007.

=== Primary Products ===
Nabua’s economy relies heavily on agriculture, driven by its extensive alluvial plains. While the sector includes crop production, livestock, and fisheries, crop cultivation is by far the most intensive.

Rice production, both irrigated and non-irrigated, occupies about 87.26% of the total agricultural land devoted to crop production while corn and other types of crops occupies merely 7.96% and 4.78% respectively. However, crop production in the entire municipality represents only about 36.94% of the total municipal land area. Livestock production can be described as one merely that of backyard raising style despite the presence of at least two farms located at Inapatan with aggregate of only 1.00 hectare and only 22,000 animal heads. Likewise, inland fishing can hardly produce much-needed agricultural revenues both for the inland fishermen as well as for the benefit of the local government.

=== Trade ===
The Poblacion of the municipality of Nabua is strategic area for commercial development. Presently, its commercial area can be classified as a minor central business district which is reflective of being a tertiary urban growth corridor along the Legazpi-Iriga-Naga-Daet-Sorsogon growth corridor. It services the commercial needs of the neighboring municipalities of Bato and Balatan, secondary only to Iriga City. Among the commercial establishments to be found within the Poblacion are wholesale trade, general merchandise, auto and motor supplies, school supplies, funeral parlor, groceries, insurance companies, banks, lending investors, pawnshops, drugstores, restaurant, and sari-sari stores.

Several barangays outside of the Poblacion functions as neighborhood centers. Those rural barangays include Santo Domingo, Malawag, La Purisima, La Opinion, Dolorosa, and San Jose.

=== Industry ===
The municipality of Nabua remains predominantly agriculturally related in terms of industrial activities at present. The existing industrial establishment within Nabua consists mainly of rice mills with total industrial of about 3,000 square meters. Cottage industries generating household employment and income proliferate in rural barangays. Nabua has a potential for agro-industrial development. This is manifested by its: (1) proximity to both Balatan Port and Pantao Port (2) Inherent vast agricultural lands (3) As an urban growth center and, (4) suitable agro-industrial site.

== Government ==
=== List of mayors ===
- Atty. Fernando "Fer" Simbulan - 1995–1998, 1998–2001, 2001–2004, 2007–2010, 2019–2022, 2022–2025, 2025–present
- Delia "Del" Castro-Simbulan - 2010–2013, 2013–2016, 2016–2019
- Atty. Fabio Figuracion - 2004–2007
- Dr. Butch Figuracion
- Dr Julito Figuracion
- Atty. Ulpiano Duran Sr.

== Infrastructure ==
=== Health ===
The municipality has Rural Health Units and hospitals nearby Poblacion area. Those are:

- Rural Health Unit 1
- Rural Health Unit 2
- Don Henrico Uvero Hospital
- Medical Mission Group Hospital (Rinconada Medical Center)
- Clinica Figuracion
- Carino Clinic
- Recuenco Optical Clinic
- Queen Hannah Birthing Clinic
- Belen Lying-in Clinic
- Tagomata Dental Clinic

=== Transportation ===
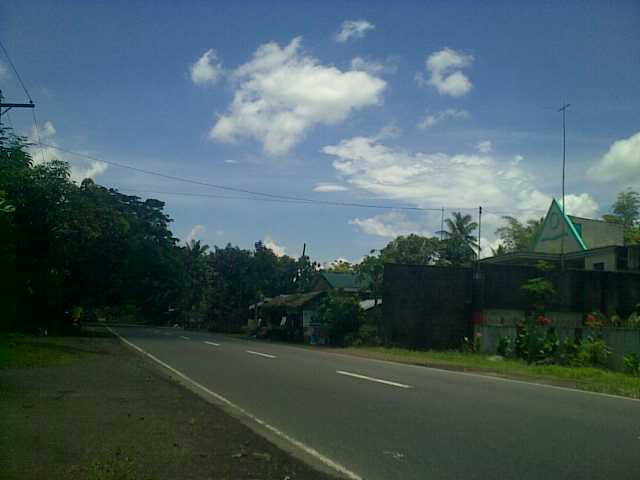
Maharlika Highway

Transportation is very much important in Nabua because of its strategic location and membership in the Legazpi-Iriga-Naga-Daet growth corridor; and it is the preferred development strategy of agro-industrial commerce and tourism.

Land transportation available are the various road systems and the Philippine National Railways (PNR) track facilities traversing the municipalities. Generally, the municipality has adequate road lengths based on the standards of 1.5 km. per 100 hectares of arable land.

=== Utilities ===
The strategic location of Nabua along the Luzon grid makes it an ample recipient of power supply from NAPOCOR. Within the municipality itself, the Camarines Sur Electric Cooperative (CASURECO) 3 as the exclusive provider retails supply of electricity. All barangays within the municipality are already energized both in urban and rural barangays.

=== Water resources ===
There are three existing Level 3 water supply systems that provide potable water, namely: Nabua Water District, Duran Water System, and Sagumay Water System.

=== Communication ===
Existing communication services and facilities includes cable television, telephone services, telegraph services and telegraphic transfer, cellphones, and postal services.

The only existing radio station in the municipality is DWEB FM 99.9 MHz of the Filipinas Broadcasting Company and the Bicol Media Network.

== Tourism ==
The town of Nabua has a large contingent of active and retired United States Navy servicemen, making it a destination for tourists, retirees, and balikbayans from the United States. The town is sometimes referred to as the Town of the Green Bucks (U.S. Dollars). Most of the families of these servicemen reside in Southern California, particularly in the San Diego area. During religious and special holidays, these U.S.-based Nabueños and Nabua natives residing in other parts of the world return to Nabua with friends, spending foreign currency that impacts the local economy and tourism.

=== Boa-Boahan Festival ===
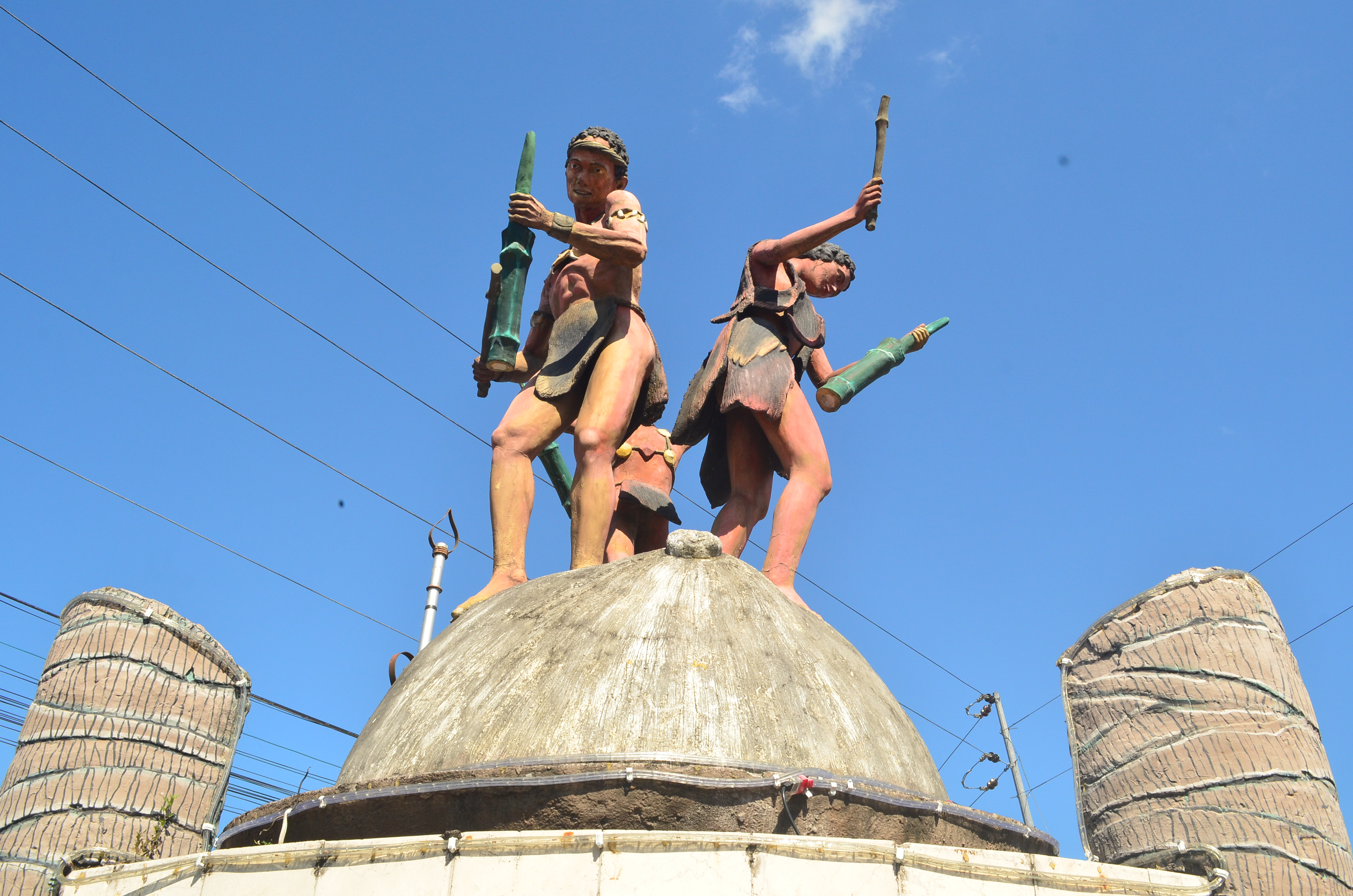
Boa-boahan Monument

Nabua celebrates its fiesta with the now-famous annual Boa-Boahan Festival on the third of May. The festival's name is now spelled Bowa-Bowahan. The highlight of the festival is the reenactment of the traditional "Boa Feast," a 13th-century rite where ancient Bicolanos offered chains of coconut embryos called boa to their pagan deities, in the belief that this would give them ample harvests, favorable weather, and make their lives more prosperous and happy throughout the year. The feast is enlivened with frenzied street theater, heart-pounding street dances and spectacles, and a riveting display of colorful and dazzling ethnic costumes. This annual festival was initiated and given unprecedented impetus and funding by then Mayor Ulpiano Duran and the town's first lady then, Mrs. Delia Duran, in tandem with the late District Supervisor Mrs. Patricia Romano and the principals, teachers, and pupils from both public and private schools.

The first-ever festival was held in 1975. Miss Julie Sales Estadilla was crowned as the festival's queen. The Bowa-bowahan pageantry was graced in the evening by a memorable dramatic revue performed by the legendary U.P. Mobile Theater under Professor and National Artist Wilfrido Ma. Guerrero, with the help of the touring company's long-time national coordinator, Mr. Timothy O. Albano. Incidentally, he and E. C. De Vera, an avid folklore research fellow, extensively studied the age-old legend and lore behind the festival's riveting mythology.

The late U.S. Engr. Cleto Descalso, a Nabueño philanthropist who chose to retire in Nabua after the decades he spent working in the United States, funded the creation of the Descalso Garden Park near the Municipal Hall. This exquisitely designed garden became the staging point for this first festival. A poetry-reading featured during the first Miss Boa-Boahan/Alinsangan beauty pageant was delivered by National Artist Mr. Riyoh Alma (Virgilio Almario). The guests of honor who crowned the festival's first Queen, Miss Julie Sales Estadilla, included the commanding generals and commodores from both the Subic Bay Naval and Clark Air bases.

=== Holy Cross Parish ===
The over 400-year-old church of Nabua known as the Vicariate of the Holy Cross is a prominent landmark along the national diversion road connecting the municipality of Baao directly to this town without passing the city of Iriga.

=== Lenten season ===
Starting from Palm Sunday to Easter Sunday, you will find 400-year-old religious customs and traditions being celebrated by the locals. Semana Santa starts with the Palm Sunday procession and blessing of Palms. On Holy Wednesday and Good Friday, the Processions of 'Pasos' are solemnly held to depict the Passion of the Christ. To commemorate Christ's resurrection, the "Balo-balu" is celebrated the night of Black Saturday and then the "Ton-ton" at dawn on Easter Sunday after the "Salubong" procession.

=== Local industries ===
Existing local industries such as bamboo craft, handloom weaving, woodcraft and basketry derived from available raw materials.

== Education ==
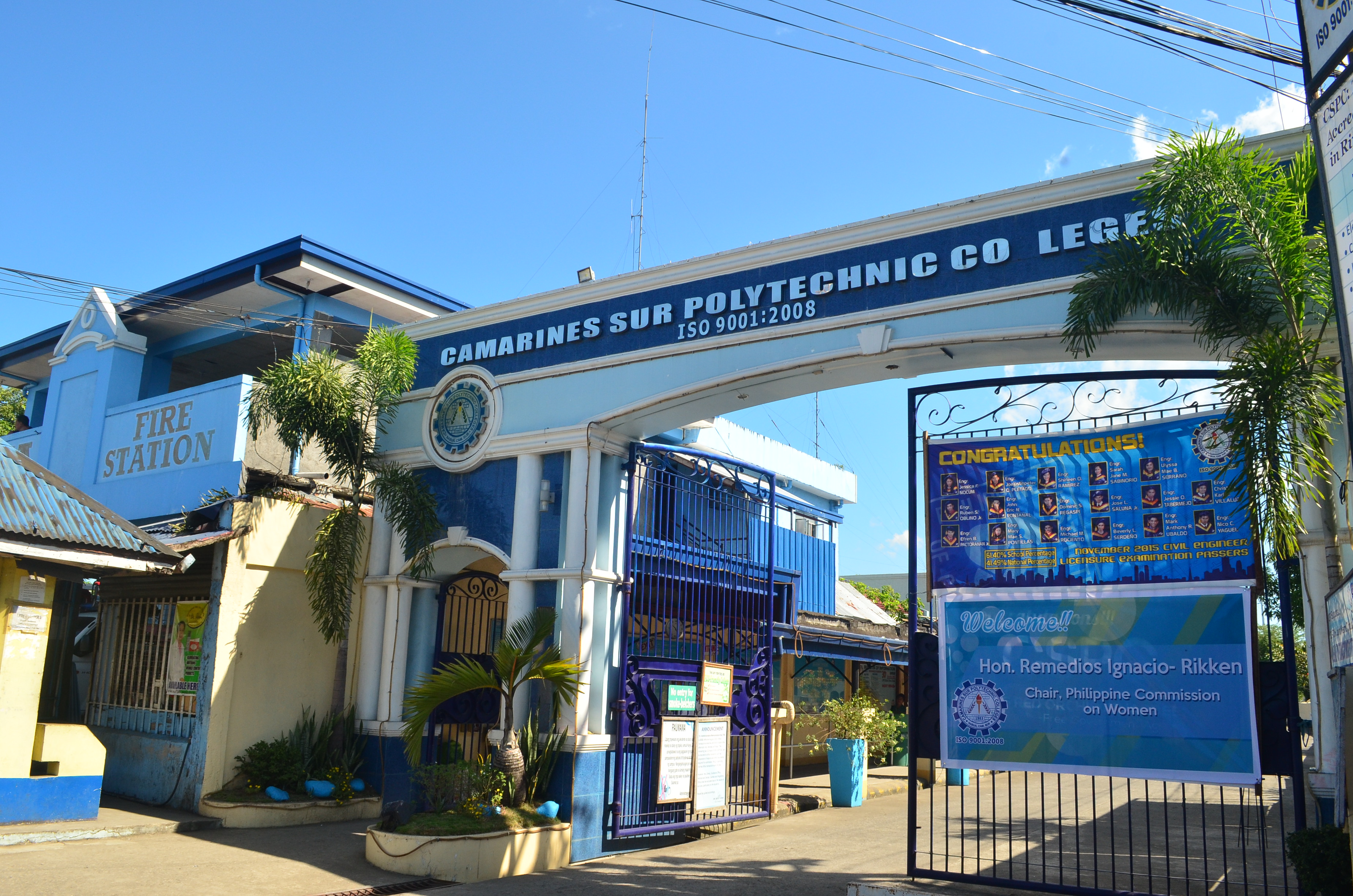
Polytechnic State University of Bicol, formerly known as Camarines Sur Polytechnic Colleges

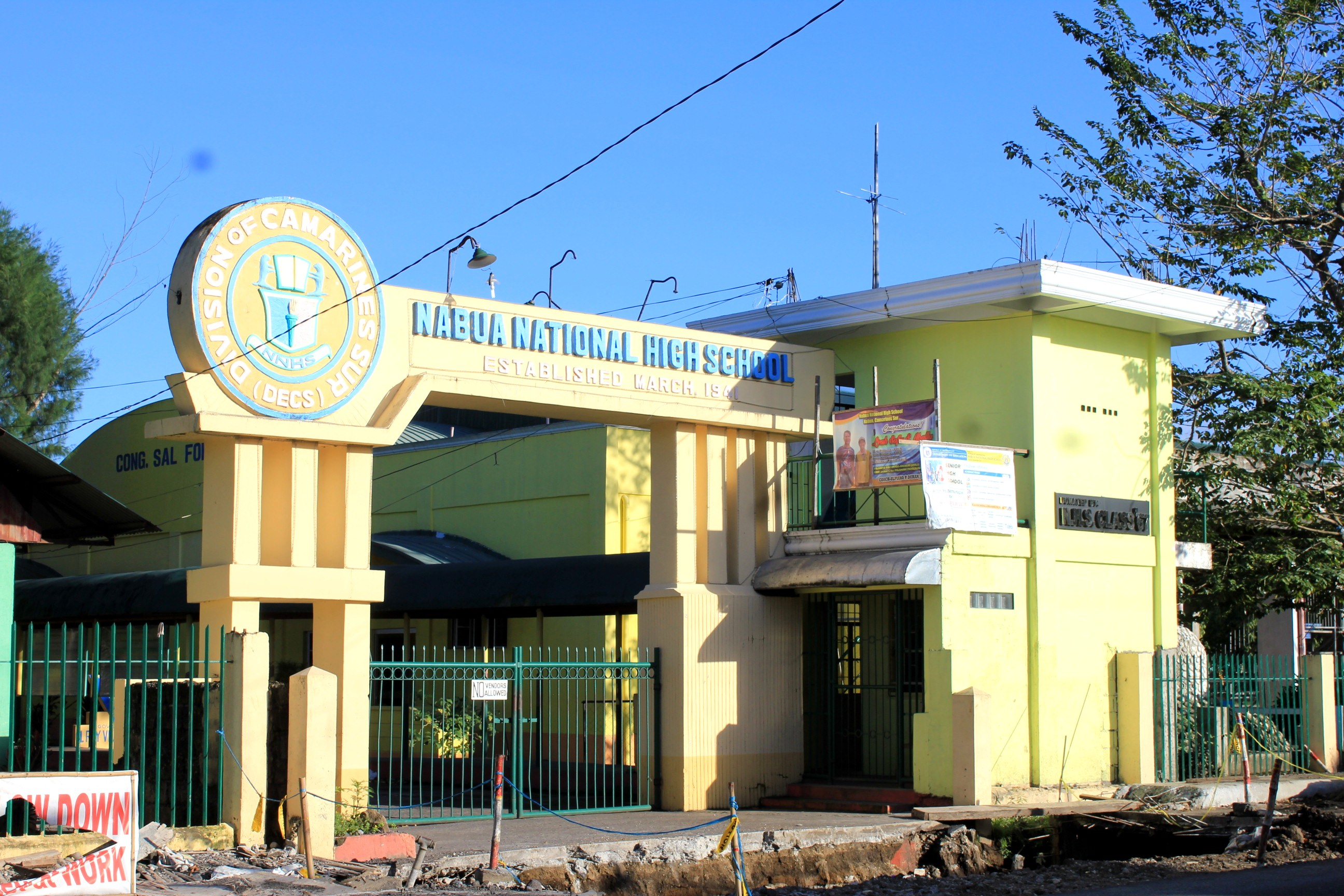
Nabua National High School

There are two schools district offices which govern all educational institutions within the municipality. They oversee the management and operations of all private and public, from primary to secondary schools. These are the:

- Nabua East Schools District
- Nabua West Schools District

Nabua boasts of a high literacy rate of 96.54% within the municipality. The people of Nabua put a premium on higher education as their key to social and economic mobility. The present level of educational services within the municipality covers a number of teachers and classrooms vis-a-vis current and projected enrollments.

For elementary level, there are a total of 33 elementary schools divided into East and West Districts with a total current enrollment of 11,947 pupils. The secondary level of education is currently provided by Nabua National High School, La Purisima National High School, Malawag Nationalized High School, Santo Domingo Institute, and Saint Jude Agro-Industrial College.

The Polytechnic State University of Bicol, formerly known as Camarines Sur Polytechnic Colleges, is a public school located in San Miguel that offers tertiary, post-graduate, as well as short–term courses, technical or vocational in nature.

Nabua is the site of large state-run and private educational institutions in Rinconada. Some of the leading schools in Nabua are:

=== Primary and elementary schools ===
- Angustia Elementary School
- Aro-aldao Elementary School
- Antipolo Young Elementary School
- Baras Elementary School
- Bustrac Elementary School
- Dolorosa Elementary School
- Gorong-Gorong Elementary School
- Holy Cross Parochial School
- Inapatan Elementary School
- La Opinion Elementary School
- Lourdes Young Elementary School
- Lourdes Old Elementary School
- Madawon Elementary School
- Malawag Elementary School
- Montessori Children's House of Learning
- Nabua Central Pilot School
- Nabua West Central School
- Nierva Elementary School
- Ogbon Elementary School
- Pacifico Elementary School
- Paloyon Elementary School
- Paloyon Oriental Elementary School
- Que Gatos Elementary School
- San Isidro Inapatan Elementary School
- San Jose Integrated School (Elementary)
- Santiago Old Elementary School
- Santiago Young Elementary School
- Sogod Elementary School
- St. Jude Thaddeus Learning Center
- Sta. Barbara Elementary School
- Sta. Cruz Elementary School
- Sta. Lucia Elementary School
- Sto. Domingo Institute
- Sto. Domingo Elementary School
- Tandaay Elementary School
- Topas Impact School

=== Secondary schools ===
- La Purisima National High School
- Lourdes Provincial High School
- Malawag National High School
- Montessori Children's House of Learning (Junior High School)
- Moreh Asia Pacific Academy
- Nabua National High School
- San Jose Integrated School (Junior High School)
- St. Jude Agro-Industrial Secondary School
- Sto. Domingo Institute
- Tandaay Provincial High School
- Victor Bernal Provincial High School

=== Higher educational institutions ===
- Camarines Sur Polytechnic Colleges

== Notable personalities ==
- Pedro B. Escuro – National Scientist of the Philippines for Genetics and Plant Breeding
- Christi Lynn A. McGarry - Filipino-American beauty queen and model
- Sofia Moran - actress, model, recording artist and philanthropist
- Elizabeth Oropesa - actress and beauty queen
- Ofelia M. Samar-Sy — Physician, Dean of Bicol University College of Medicine
