= DXOC-AM =

Radyo Pilipino Ozamiz (DXOC)
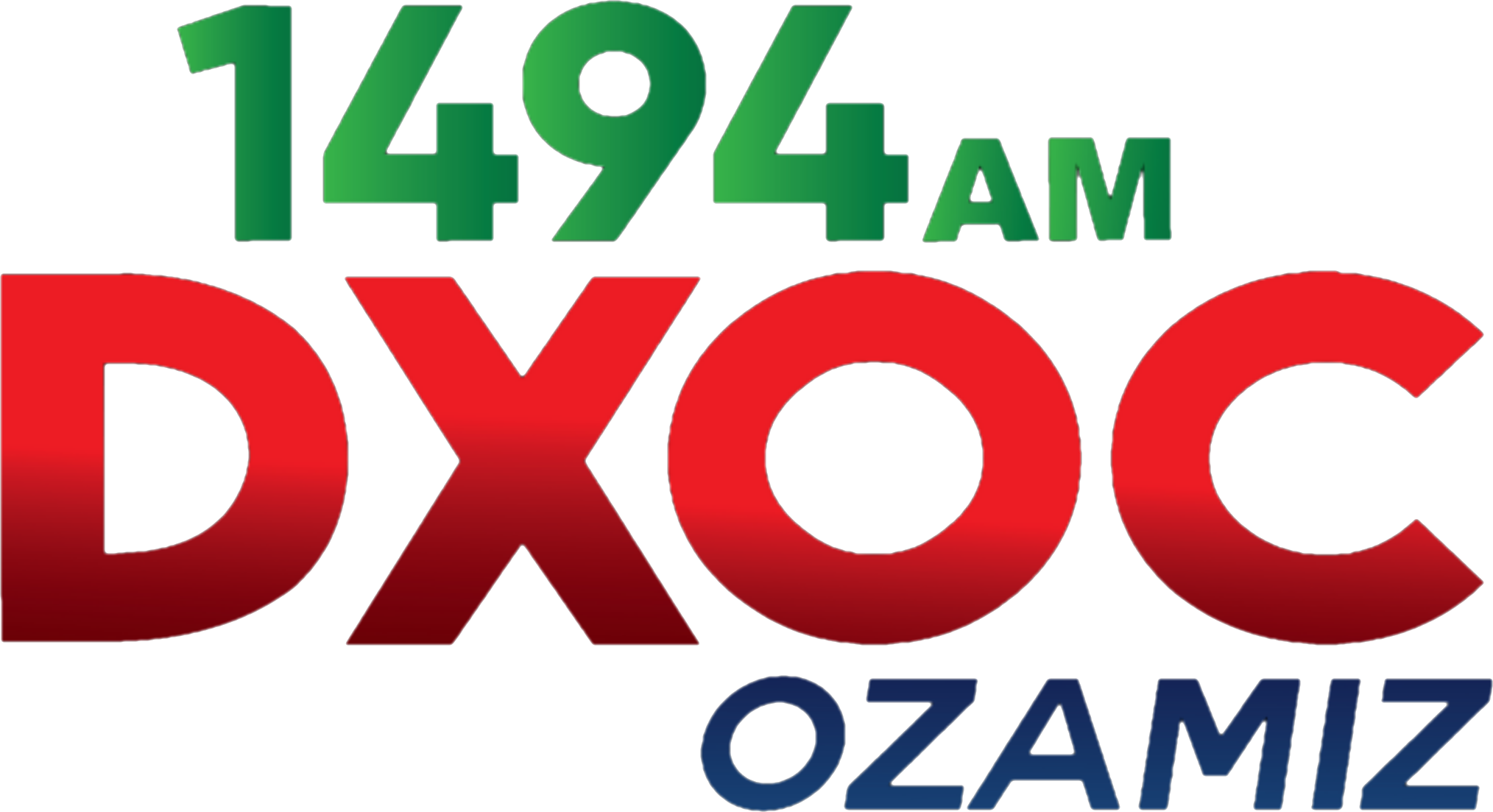

Ozamiz; Philippines
- Broadcast area: Misamis Occidental and surrounding areas
- Frequency: 1494 kHz
- Branding: DXOC 1494 Radyo Pilipino

Programming
- Languages: Filipino, Cebuano
- Format: News, Public Affairs, Talk
- Network: Radyo Pilipino
- Affiliations: Radio Mindanao Network

Ownership
- Owner: Radyo Pilipino Corporation; (Radio Audience Developers Integrated Organization, Inc.)

History
- First air date: 1959
- Former names: Radyo Asenso
- Former frequencies: 1480 kHz (1959–1978)
- Call sign meaning: Ozamiz City

Technical information
- Licensing authority: NTC
- Class: CDE
- Power: 5,000 watts

DXOC (1494 AM) Radyo Pilipino is a radio station owned and operated by Radyo Pilipino Corporation through its licensee Radio Audience Developers Integrated Organization (RADIO), Inc. The station's studio is located at Purok 3, Brgy. Catadman-Manabay, Ozamiz. DXOC is one of the few Radyo Pilipino stations affiliated with Radio Mindanao Network.

== History ==
DXOC is the pioneer station in Ozamiz, established in 1959 by Filipinas Broadcasting Network. In 1962, from its old location at the import-export compound in the middle of the rice field of Batjak, Inc. owned by Mr. & Mrs. Narciso Lim along Bernard St., the station transferred to its present location in Manabay, about 500 meters away from the Ozamiz City Hall. In 1983, DXOC was acquired by RADIO, Inc., a subsidiary of RadioCorp.
