= Radyo Pilipino Corporation =

Philippine broadcasting company

Radyo Pilipino Corporation (Radyo Pilipino Media Group)
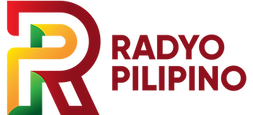
- Type: Private
- Industry: Broadcast media Television production
- Founded: 1924 (original incarnation); April 7, 1980 (Radyo Pilipino Corporation); June 25, 1985 (re-incorporation)
- Headquarters: Intramuros, Manila, Philippines
- Key people: Claudia D. Cojuangco (President and CEO)
- Owner: Danding Cojuangco
- Parent: Lucky Star Holdings
- Subsidiaries: Radio Corporation of the Philippines (RadioCorp); Philippine Radio Corporation (PhilRadio); Radio Audience Developers Integrated Organization Inc. (RADIO Inc.); Beacon Communications Systems Inc. (BCSI)
- Website: www.radyopilipino.com

Radyo Pilipino
- Type: Broadcast AM radio network
- Country: Philippines

Programming
- Format: News, Public Service, Talk

History
- Former names: Radyo Asenso

Coverage
- Availability: National

Links
- Webcast: Listen Live (Manila/network feed)
- Website: www.radyopilipino.com

One FM
- Type: Broadcast FM radio network
- Country: Philippines

Programming
- Format: Contemporary MOR, OPM

History
- Founded: 1981

Coverage
- Availability: National

Links
- Webcast: Listen Live (Manila/network feed)
- Website: www.onefm.ph

Radyo Pilipino Corporation, presently operating as Radyo Pilipino Media Group, is a Philippine broadcasting company owned by Lucky Star Holdings. Originally founded in 1924, it is the oldest radio network in the Philippines; its current incarnation was founded on June 25, 1985, by a consortium led by businessman-politician Eduardo Cojuangco Jr.

Radyo Pilipino Corporation has four subsidiaries which currently serve as licensees: Radio Corporation of the Philippines (RadioCorp), Philippine Radio Corporation (PhilRadio), Radio Audience Developers Integrated Organization Inc. (RADIO Inc.), and Beacon Communications Systems Inc. (BCSI).

Currently, Radyo Pilipino Media Group owns two national radio brands, namely the AM network Radyo Pilipino (formerly known as Radyo Asenso), and the FM network One FM, and its lone television station RTV Tarlac Channel 26.

== History ==
KZKZ (AM) is the second radio station in the Philippines owned by Henry Herman Sr. in 1922. It broadcast using a 5-watt transmitter. In 1924, it boosted its power to 100 watts. A few months later, Radio Corporation of the Philippines bought KZKZ AM from Henry Hermann. In 1926 the company began to work on constructing two of the largest radio stations in Asia with the idea of maintaining direct Manila-San Francisco service.

On April 7, 1980, Radyo Pilipino Corporation was founded with the acquisition of Tarlac-based DZTC AM in 1981.

On June 25, 1985, the current incarnation of RadioCorp was founded by a consortium led by Eduardo Cojuangco Jr. following the acquisition of Tarlac-based DWXT FM.

In 2015, RadioCorp officially ventured into television broadcasting with the launch of the network's first television station, DWRP-TV 26 on January 15. It was an affiliate of CNN Philippines until 2021.

In 2019, the RadioCorp group formally restructured its operations under a new name: Radyo Pilipino Media Group (named after Radyo Pilipino Corporation). With the relaunch, its AM stations, with most of them under the Radyo Asenso network, were rebranded under its namesake brand.

On October 21, 2019, Philippine President Rodrigo Duterte signed Republic Act No. 11415 which renewed Radyo Pilipino Corporation's legislative franchise for another 25 years. The law grants Radyo Pilipino Corporation a franchise to construct, install, operate, and maintain, for commercial purposes, radio broadcasting stations and television stations, including digital television system, with the corresponding facilities such as relay stations, throughout the Philippines.

In 2021, DWRP-TV was rebranded as RTV Tarlac Channel 26 and became an independent station.

== Radio stations ==
=== AM stations ===
Branding	Callsign	Frequency	Location
Radyo Pilipino Tarlac	DZTC	828 kHz	Tarlac City
Radyo Pilipino Dagupan	DWPR	1296 kHz	Dagupan
Radyo Pilipino Lucena	DZLT	1188 kHz	Lucena
Radyo Pilipino Legazpi	DWRL	1080 kHz	Legazpi
Radyo Pilipino Naga	DWRN	657 kHz	Naga
Radyo Pilipino Mindoro	DZYM	1539 kHz	San Jose
Radyo Pilipino Bacolod	DYRL	1035 kHz	Bacolod
Radyo Pilipino Cebu	DYRB	540 kHz	Cebu City
Radyo Pilipino Dumaguete	DYRM	1134 kHz	Dumaguete
Radyo Pilipino Cagayan de Oro	DXCO	1044 kHz	Cagayan de Oro
Radyo Pilipino Ozamiz	DXOC	1494 kHz	Ozamiz
Radyo Pilipino General Santos	DXGS	765 kHz	General Santos
Radyo Pilipino Davao	DXOW	981 kHz	Davao City

=== FM stations ===
Branding	Callsign	Frequency	Location
One FM Baler	DWBV	99.3 MHz	Baler
One FM Tarlac	DWXT	96.1 MHz	Tarlac City
One FM Lucena	DZLQ	98.3 MHz	Lucena
One FM Legazpi	DWGO	88.3 MHz	Legazpi
One FM Mindoro	DZYM	92.1 MHz	San Jose
One FM Palawan	DYQS	95.1 MHz	Puerto Princesa
One FM Tacloban	DYCJ	96.7 MHz	Tacloban
One FM Butuan	DXPQ	95.9 MHz	Butuan
One FM Surigao	DXSP	96.1 MHz	Surigao City

=== Internet radio stations ===
Presently, Radyo Pilipino Media Group operates its own online stations under Radyo Pilipino and One FM brands broadcasting from its Manila studios. These online stations are also enacted as "network" feeds for their national programs via hookup to selected stations.

== TV stations ==
=== Analog ===
Branding	Callsign	Channel	Location	Notes
RTV Tarlac	DWRP	26	Tarlac City	Formerly affiliated with Radio Philippines Network and Nine Media Corporation from 2015 to 2021.
