= List of radio stations in the Bicol Region =

This is a list of radio stations in the Bicol Region, which is located at the Southeastern Luzon and in the northeastern Philippines. It includes the cities of Masbate, Sorsogon, Legazpi, Ligao, Tabaco, Iriga and Naga.

== Albay ==
=== AM Stations ===
Frequency	Name	Format	Call Sign	Covered Location	Owner
621 AM	Radyo Pilipinas Albay	News, Public affairs, Talk, Government radio	DWJS	Legazpi City	Presidential Broadcast Service
729 AM	DZGB 729	News, Public affairs, Talk	DZGB	Legazpi City	PBN Broadcasting Network
927 AM	Bombo Radyo Legazpi	News, Public affairs, Talk, Drama	DZLG	Legazpi City	People's Broadcasting Service, Inc. (part of Bombo Radyo Philippines)
1008 AM	Radyo Veritas Legazpi	News, Public affairs, Talk, Religious radio	DWBS	Legazpi City	Catholic Bishops Conference of the Philippines (operated by the Diocese of Legazpi; a member of the Catholic Media Network)
1080 AM	Radyo Pilipino Legazpi	News, Public affairs, Talk	DWRL	Legazpi City	Radio Audience Developers Integrated Organization (RADIO), Inc. (a subsidiary of Radyo Pilipino Media Group)

=== FM Stations ===
Frequency	Name	Format	Call Sign	Covered Location	Owner
88.3 FM	One FM Legazpi	Contemporary MOR, OPM	DWGO-FM	Legazpi City	Radio Audience Developers Integrated Organization (RADIO), Inc. (a subsidiary of Radyo Pilipino Media Group)
89.9 FM	iFM Legazpi	Contemporary MOR, News, Talk	DWFX	Legaspi City	Radio Mindanao Network
90.3 FM	Radyo Bandera Polangui	Contemporary MOR, News, Talk	DWJB	Polangui, Albay	Fairwaves Broadcasting Network (operated by Radyo Bandera Network Philippines, Inc.)
90.7 FM	Radyo Oragon	Contemporary MOR, News, Talk	DWII	Legazpi City	iTransmission, Inc. (operated by Mid-Tone Broadcasting Network)
91.3 FM	One Radio News FM	Contemporary MOR, News, Talk	DWKN	Tabaco City	Capricom Production & Management
91.5 FM	Brigada News FM Legazpi	Contemporary MOR, News, Talk	DWED	Legazpi City	Century Broadcasting Network (operated by Brigada Mass Media Corporation)
92.3 FM	Home Radio Legaspi	Soft AC	DWQA	Legazpi City	Aliw Broadcasting Corporation
94.7 FM	Spirit FM Legazpi	Top 40 (CHR), OPM, Religious Radio	DWCZ	Legazpi City	Catholic Bishops Conference of the Philippines (Diocese of Legazpi; a member of the Catholic Media Network)
95.5 FM	Sigaw Music & News FM	Contemporary MOR, News, Talk	DWRC	Legazpi City	Filipinas Broadcasting Network
95.7 FM	Fresh FM/Radyo Ng Libon	Top 40 (CHR), OPM, Community Radio	—N/a	Libon	Iddes Broadcast Group
96.3 FM	Barangay LS Legazpi	Contemporary MOR, OPM	DWCW	Legazpi City	GMA Network, Inc.
97.1 FM	OKFM Legazpi	Contemporary MOR, OPM	DWGB	Legazpi City	PBN Broadcasting Network
99.5 FM	Love Radio Legazpi	Contemporary MOR, OPM	DWCM	Legazpi City	Pacific Broadcasting System, Inc. (licensee of MBC Media Group)
100.5 FM	Radyo Pwersa	Contemporary MOR, News, Talk	D___	Tabaco City	Amapola Broadcasting System
101.1 FM	Radyo Siram	Contemporary MOR, News, Talk	—N/a	Legazpi City	Subic Broadcasting Corporation
101.9 FM	Zagitsit News FM	Contemporary MOR, News, Talk	DWKP	Legaspi City	DCG Radio-TV Network (Katigbak Enterprises Inc.)
102.7 FM	Radyo Polangui	Community radio	DZEV	Polangui, Albay	Allied Broadcasting Center
104.3 FM	Care 104.3	CCM Talk Radio	DWAY-FM	Legazpi City	Far East Broadcasting Company
104.9 FM	Radyo Natin Tiwi	Community radio	DWRU	Tiwi, Albay	MBC Media Group
106.3 FM	BUFM	Campus radio	DWBU	Legazpi City	Bicol University
106.9 FM	WGB FM Tabaco	Contemporary MOR, News, Talk	DWPT	Tabaco City	PBN Broadcasting Network
107.5 FM	UST Legazpi Radio	College radio, Religious radio	DWAQ	Legazpi City	University of Santo Tomas–Legazpi
107.7 FM	Radyo Natin Tabaco	Community radio	DWCB	Tabaco City	Cebu Broadcasting Company (licensee of MBC Media Group)

=== Internet radio stations ===
Name	Format	Tagline	Covered Location	Owner
Bespren Radio	Contemporary MOR, OPM	Easy Listening, 24/7	Albay & Worldwide	StreamNavs Online Streaming Services
4506 Radio	Soft Rock. Easy Listening. OPM Classics. Music that feels like home.	The Sound That Feels Like Home	Albay & Worldwide	iStreamo (Non-Commercial)
Mayon Internet TV	News, Public affairs, Talk	Ang Kapitbahay Niyo!	Albay & Worldwide	MyOwnInternetTv

== Camarines Norte ==
=== FM Stations ===
Frequency	Name	Format	Call Sign	Covered Location	Owner
89.7 FM	Radyo Lingkod Bayan	Community radio	DWLB	Labo	Tambuli Media
91.3 FM	Radyo Bantayog	Community radio	DWCV	Talisay	Polytechnic Foundation of Cotabato and Asia
94.1 FM	Power Radio Daet	Contemporary MOR, News, Talk	DWSR	Daet	Caceres Broadcasting Corporation (affiliated with Radio Mindanao Network)
95.3 FM	Love Radio Daet	Contemporary MOR, OPM	DWKS	Daet	MBC Media Group
96.9 FM	Radyo Pilipinas Daet	News, Public Affairs, Talk, Government radio	DWCN	Daet	Presidential Broadcast Service
98.5 FM	OKFM Daet	Contemporary MOR, News, Talk	DWJL	Daet	PBN Broadcasting Network
99.3 FM	Radyo Natin Sta. Elena	Community radio	DZVC	Santa Elena	MBC Media Group
99.7 FM	One Radio News FM	Contemporary MOR, News Talk	—N/a	Daet	Capricom Production & Management/Capricom Broadcasting Network Corporation
100.5 FM	Boom Radio Daet	Contemporary MOR, News, Talk	DWEN	Daet	Hypersonic Broadcasting Center
101.3 FM	Radyo Natin Paracale	Community radio	DZVN	Paracale	MBC Media Group
102.9 FM	Brigada News FM Daet	Contemporary MOR, News, Talk	DWYD	Daet	Baycomms Broadcasting Corporation (a subsidiary of Brigada Mass Media Corporation
106.1 FM	Mabini College FM	Campus radio	DZBA	Daet	Mabini Colleges

== Camarines Sur ==
=== AM Stations ===
Frequency	Name	Format	Call Sign	Covered Location	Owner
549 AM	Radyo Pilipinas Naga	News, Public Affairs, Talk, Government radio	DWRB	Naga City	Presidential Broadcast Service
657 AM	Radyo Pilipino Naga	News, Public Affairs, Talk	DWRN	Naga City	Philippine Radio Corporation (a subsidiary of Radyo Pilipino Media Group)
711 AM	Radyo Agila Naga	News, Public Affairs, Talk	DZLW	Naga City	Eagle Broadcasting Corporation
981 AM	DZRH Naga (relay from Manila)	News, Public Affairs, Talk, Drama	DWMT	Naga City	Philippine Broadcasting Corporation (an affiliate of Manila Broadcasting Company)
1044 AM	Bombo Radyo Naga	News, Public Affairs, Talk, Drama	DZNG	Naga City	Newsounds Broadcasting Network, Inc. (part of Bombo Radyo Philippines)
1296 AM	RMN Naga	News, Public Affairs, Talk	DWNX	Naga City	Radio Mindanao Network
1332 AM	Radyo Ronda Iriga	News, Public Affairs, Talk	DZKI	Iriga City	Radio Philippines Network

=== FM Stations ===
Frequency	Station Name	Format	Call Sign	Coverage	Owner
87.5 FM	Citizens' Choice Radio	Campus radio	DZCC	Nabua, Camarines Sur	Polytechnic State University of Bicol
87.7 FM	Brigada News FM Goa	Contemporary MOR, OPM, News/Talk	DWSA	Goa, Camarines Sur	Baycomms Broadcasting Corporation (a subsidiary of Brigada Mass Media Corporation)
87.9 FM	Flash FM	Soft AC, OPM	—N/a	Naga City	—N/a
89.5 FM	Radyo Natin Naga	Community radio	DZTR	Naga City	Cebu Broadcasting Company (an affiliate of MBC Media Group)
91.1 FM	RMN Naga	News/Talk, Public Affairs	DWNX	Naga City	Radio Mindanao Network
91.9 FM	BBS FM	Classic Hits, News/Talk	DWLV	Naga City	Bicol Broadcasting System, Inc.
92.7 FM	Eagle FM	Contemporary MOR, OPM, News/Talk	DWWL	Canaman, Camarines Sur	Eagle Broadcasting Corporation
94.3 FM	University FM Nabua	Campus radio	—N/a	Nabua, Camarines Sur	Philippine Collective Media Corporation (operated by the Polytechnic State University of Bicol)
94.5 FM	FMR Camarines Sur	Contemporary MOR, OPM, News/Talk	DZRP	Goa, Camarines Sur	Partido Development Administration (affiliated with Philippine Collective Media Corporation)
95.1 FM	Home Radio Naga	Soft AC	DWQJ	Naga City	Aliw Broadcasting Corporation
96.5 FM	Radyo Kafuerte Teleradyo	Contemporary MOR, OPM, News/Talk	DWBN	Naga City	Provincial Government of Camarines Sur
96.7 FM	Ratsada News FM	Contemporary MOR, OPM, News/Talk	DWWV	Iriga City	Allied Broadcasting Center (operated by Tune8 Media Production)
97.5 FM	OKFM Naga	Contemporary MOR, OPM, News/Talk	DZOK	Naga City	PBN Broadcasting Network
97.7 FM	Wow EA FM	Contemporary MOR, OPM, News/Talk	DWEA	Buhi, Camarines Sur	Our Lady's Foundation, Inc.
98.3 FM	The Mother's Touch	Religious Radio	DWRV	Naga City	Global Broadcasting System, Inc. (operated by the Franciscan Friars of the Immaculate; a member of the Catholic Media Network)
99.1 FM	Love Radio Naga	Contemporary MOR, OPM	DWYN	Naga City	MBC Media Group
99.3 FM	Kakampi FM Partido	Contemporary MOR, OPM, News/Talk	—N/a	Goa, Camarines Sur	Subic Broadcasting Corporation
99.9 FM	DWEB 99.9	Contemporary MOR, OPM, News/Talk	DWEB	Nabua, Camarines Sur	Filipinas Broadcasting Network
100.1 FM	Radyo Natin Buhi	Community radio	DZVF	Buhi, Camarines Sur	MBC Media Group
100.9 FM	Partido News FM	Contemporary MOR, OPM, News/Talk	—N/a	Goa, Camarines Sur	Palawan Broadcasting Corporation
101.5 FM	Barangay LS Naga	Contemporary MOR, OPM	DWQW	Naga City	GMA Network, Inc.
103.1 FM	Brigada News FM Naga	Contemporary MOR, OPM, News/Talk	DWKM	Naga City	Century Broadcasting Network (operated by Brigada Mass Media Corporation)
103.3 FM	PSU Campus Radio	Campus radio	DWPD	Goa, Camarines Sur	Partido State University
104.7 FM	Bossing FM	Contemporary MOR, OPM, News/Talk	DWSS	Naga City	Caceres Broadcasting Corporation
105.5 FM	Zoom Radio	Contemporary MOR, OPM, News/Talk	DWRG	Naga City	Allied Broadcasting Center
106.3 FM	Energy FM Naga	Contemporary MOR, OPM	DWBQ	Naga City	Ultrasonic Broadcasting System
107.1 FM	Radyo Natin Iriga	Community radio	DWIR	Iriga City	Pacific Broadcasting System, Inc. (an affiliate of Manila Broadcasting Company)
107.9 FM	Win Radio Naga	Contemporary MOR, OPM	DWMW	Naga City	ZimZam Management/Mabuhay Broadcasting System

=== Internet Radio Stations ===
Name	Format	Tagline	Covered Location	Owner
X FM Naga	Contemporary MOR, CHR Top 40, OPM	Naga City's One and Only Hit Music Station!	Naga City & Worldwide	Rebel Media Philippines (Non-commercial Music)
One FM Naga	Soft AC, OPM, Classic hits	Ka Buddy N'yo!	Naga City & Worldwide	(Live streaming)
SAWI121FM	Classic hits songs of the 60s, 70s, 80s and 90s	Samahan Walang Iwanan	Naga City & Worldwide	(Live streaming)
Cool FM Goa	Contemporary MOR, OPM	Listen and Be Cool	Goa Cam Sur & Worldwide	Radio.org.ph
Classic Radio	Classic Songs, OPM	Your Home, Your Music	Goa Cam Sur & Worldwide	Papa Glenn
KKBN FM	Talk, Community radio, Classic hits songs of the 60s, 70s, 80s and 90s	Kape ni Manoy	Goa, Cam Sur & Worldwide	Weebly.com (Live)
One Radio Naga	Talk, Christian Music, Religious Radio,	One God, One Music	Naga City & Worldwide	OnlineRadioBox.com (Live streaming)
Just My Radio	Contemporary MOR, OPM, Classic hits songs of the 60s, 70s, 80s, 90s and 2000s,	Your Music Online	Naga City & Worldwide	OnlineRadioBox.com (Live streaming)
USANT Radio Online	Classic hits songs of the 60s, 70s, 80s and 90s		Iriga City & Worldwide	OnlineRadioBox.com (Live streaming)

== Catanduanes ==
=== FM Stations ===
Frequency	Name	Format	Call Sign	Covered Location	Owner
87.9 FM	Radyo Peryodiko	Contemporary MOR, OPM, News/Talk	DZBP	Virac, Catanduanes	Palawan Broadcasting Corporation (operated by Bicol Peryodiko Publishing and Broadcasting Services)
88.7 FM	Radyo Oragon Virac (relay from Legazpi)	Contemporary MOR, OPM, News/Talk	DZIT	Virac, Catanduanes	Mid-Tone Broadcasting Network (a subsidiary of iTransmission, Inc.)
94.3 FM	Radyo Pilipinas Catanduanes	News, Public Affairs, Talk, Government Radio	DWDF	Virac, Catanduanes	Presidential Broadcast Service
98.9 FM	Radyo Kaamigo	Community radio	DZNJ	Panganiban, Catanduanes	National Nutrition Council (part of the Nutriskwela Community Radio network)
107.1 FM	Radyo Natin Virac	Community radio	DWJS	Virac, Catanduanes	Pacific Broadcasting System, Inc. (an affiliate of MBC Media Group)

== Masbate ==
=== AM Stations ===
Frequency	Name	Format	Call Sign	Covered Location	Owner
783 AM	DYME 783 Masbate	News, Talkback	DYME	Masbate City	Masbate Community Broadcasting Company/Radio Mindanao Network

=== FM Stations ===
Frequency	Name	Format	Call Sign	Covered Location	Owner
93.3 FM	DZEE 93.3	College radio	DZEE	Mandaon, Masbate	Dr. Emilio B. Espinosa Sr. Memorial State College of Agriculture and Technology
95.9 FM	K5 News FM Masbate	Contemporary MOR, OPM, News/Talk	DYME	Masbate City	Masbate Community Broadcasting Company/5K Broadcasting Network/Radio Mindanao Network
97.5 FM	El Oro Radyo	Full Service	DWPA	Aroroy, Masbate	Presidential Broadcast Service
98.3 FM	Spirit FM Masbate	Catholic Radio	DZIM	Masbate City	Catholic Media Network
99.1 FM	Radyo Kabag-uhan Cataingan	Community radio	DZNT	Cataingan, Masbate	National Nutrition Council /Nutriskwela Community Radio & Municipal Government of Cataingan
106.5 FM	Radyo Kahamugaway Cawayan	Community radio	DWNZ	Cawayan, Masbate	National Nutrition Council/Nutriskwela Community Radio & Municipal Government of Cawayan
107.1 FM	Radyo Natin Masbate	Community radio	DYRQ	Masbate City	MBC Media Group/Radyo Natin Network

== Sorsogon ==
=== AM Stations ===
Frequency	Name	Format	Call Sign	Covered Location	Owner
1287 AM	DZRH Sorsogon (relay from Manila)	News, Public affairs, Talk, Drama	DZZH	Sorsogon City	MBC Media Group

=== FM Stations ===
Frequency	Name	Format	Call Sign	Covered Location	Owner
88.1 FM	Pasalinggaya FM	Contemporary MOR, News, Talk	DWPY	Casiguran, Sorsogon	PEC Broadcasting Corporation (operated by Pasalinggaya Media Network)
89.5 FM	OKFM Sorsogon	Contemporary MOR, OPM, News, Talk	DWJX	Sorsogon City	PBN Broadcasting Network
91.9 FM	Radyo Natin Sorsogon	Community radio	DWSG	Sorsogon City	MBC Media Group/Radyo Natin Network
92.9 FM	Frontline Radio	Contemporary MOR, News, Talk	DWAX	Pilar, Sorsogon	Wow Smile Media Services (affiliated with Radio Mindanao Network)
93.5 FM	Friends Tayo FM	Contemporary MOR, News, Talk	DWFR	Bulan, Sorsogon	Iddes Broadcast Group
95.3 FM	Wow Smile Radio Bulan	Contemporary MOR, News, Talk	DWAO	Bulan, Sorsogon	Wow Smile Media Services (affiliated with Radio Mindanao Network)
99.9 FM	Wow Smile Radio	Contemporary MOR, News, Talk	DWAW	Sorsogon City	Allied Broadcasting Center (operated by Wow Smile Media Services; affiliated with Radio Mindanao Network)
100.7 FM	New Gen FM	Contemporary MOR, News, Talk	DWPC	Bulan, Sorsogon	—N/a
101.5 FM	Brigada News FM Sorsogon	Contemporary MOR, News, Talk	DWLH	Sorsogon City	Hypersonic Broadcasting Center (operated by Brigada Mass Media Corporation)
102.3 FM	Spirit FM Sorsogon	Contemporary MOR, OPM, Religious radio	DZGN	Sorsogon City	Good News Sorsogon Foundation, Inc. (a member of the Catholic Media Network)
102.9 FM	Radyo Natin Pilar	Community radio	DWMP	Pilar, Sorsogon	MBC Media Group
104.7 FM	Radyo Natin Irosin	Community radio	DWMO	Irosin, Sorsogon	MBC Media Group (operated by Irosin Broadcasting Network)
105.5 FM	DPR Radio	Community radio	DWDR	Sorsogon City	Sorsogon Provincial Disaster Risk Reduction and Management Office
107.5 FM	BIG M Radio	Contemporary MOR, OPM	—N/a	Casiguran, Sorsogon	Christian Music Power Incorporated
