= DWGV =

DWGV is the callsign of Apollo Broadcast Investors' stations in Angeles City:

- DWGV-AM, an AM radio station branded as GVAM
- DWGV-FM, an FM radio station branded as GVFM
