= DZIM =

Radio station in Masbate City

Spirit FM Masbate (DZIM)
- Masbate City; Philippines
- Broadcast area: Masbate and surrounding areas
- Frequency: 98.3 MHz
- Branding: 98.3 Spirit FM

Programming
- Languages: Masbateño, Filipino
- Format: Contemporary MOR, OPM, Religious Radio
- Affiliations: Catholic Media Network

Ownership
- Owner: Diocese of Masbate

History
- First air date: January 2010
- Call sign meaning: Ismael Misolas

Technical information
- Licensing authority: NTC
- Class: C / D / E
- Power: 5,000 watts

DZIM (98.3 FM), broadcasting as 98.3 Spirit FM, is a radio station owned and operated by the Diocese of Masbate. Its studio is located beside the Masbate Cathedral, Quezon St., Brgy. Centro, Masbate City, and its transmitter is located along Seminary Hills Rd., Masbate City. The station can be heard on local cable via Charles Cable Channel 31.
