= DWBS =

DWBS is the callsign of the following radio stations in the Philippines

- DWBS-AM, 1008 kHz, in Albay
- DWBS-FM, 88.7 MHz, in Sorsogon
