= Padaba Radio =

Sorsogon City; Philippines
- Broadcast area: Sorsogon and surrounding areas
- Frequency: 99.3 MHz

Programming
- Languages: Bicolano, Filipino
- Format: Silent

Ownership
- Owner: Lann's Radio Media Network

History
- First air date: 2009
- Last air date: 2024
- Former call signs: DWOL (2009–2017); DWAW (2017–2022)
- Former frequencies: 103.9 MHz (2009–2017); 98.5 MHz (2017); 99.9 MHz (2017–2022)

Technical information
- Licensing authority: NTC

Padaba Radio (99.3 FM) was a radio station owned and operated by Lann's Radio Media Network. Its studios and transmitter are located at Sampaguita Village, Brgy. San Juan, Roro, Sorsogon City.

== History ==
The station was established in 2009 under Our Lady's Foundation-owned 103.9 MHz. In early 2017, it was moved temporarily to 98.5 MHz before it transferred to Allied Broadcasting Center-owned 99.9 MHz in December 2017. In March 2022, it migrated its operations online under 99.3 MHz, but the callsign is under Provisional Authority before Wow Smile Radio's took its old frequency (99.9 MHz) in June 2022. In late-2024, it went off the air for over fifteen years for unknown reasons.
