= Jose Bantolo =

Filipino Roman Catholic bishop (1960–2025)

The Most Reverend Jose Bantolo
- Bishop of Masbate
- Province: Caceres
- See: Masbate
- Appointed: March 19, 2011
- Installed: September 6, 2011
- Term ended: December 13, 2025
- Predecessor: Joel Z. Baylon
- Successor: Vacant
- Previous post: Vicar General of San Jose de Antique

Orders
- Ordination: April 21, 1986 by Raul Martirez
- Consecration: August 22, 2011 by Angel Lagdameo, Jose Romeo Lazo, Raul Martirez

Personal details
- Born: November 12, 1960 Guisijan, Laua-an, Antique, Philippines
- Died: December 13, 2025 (aged 65)
- Education: Pontifical Gregorian University
- Motto: Vivere Christus Est
- Coat of arms

Styles of Jose Salmorin Bantolo
- Reference style: His Excellency; The Most Reverend
- Spoken style: Your Excellency
- Religious style: Bishop

Jose Salmorin Bantolo (November 12, 1960 – December 13, 2025) was a Filipino prelate of the Roman Catholic Church who at the time of his death was the bishop of the Diocese of Masbate. He was appointed to the episcopacy by Pope Benedict XVI on March 19, 2011, and was consecrated on August 22, 2011.

== Early life and education ==
Bantolo was born in Guisijan, Laua-an, Antique, Philippines on November 12, 1960. After completing secondary education, he pursued studies in philosophy at St. Peter Seminary and St. Anthony's College in Antique. He studied theology at San Jose Seminary in Quezon City before obtaining a Licentiate in Theology from the Pontifical Gregorian University in Rome in 2000. He furthered his studies in applied theology in Berkeley, California.

== Priesthood ==
Bantolo was ordained a priest on April 21, 1986, for the Diocese of San Jose de Antique. He was initially a parish priest at St. Augustine Parish in Patnongon, Antique. In 1988, he was appointed rector of St. Peter Seminary in San Jose de Buenavista, Antique. In 2001, he was named diocesan treasurer and in 2007 he became the president of St. Anthony's College in Antique. Prior to his episcopal appointment, he had been vicar general of the Diocese of San Jose de Antique.

== Episcopal ministry ==
On March 19, 2011, Pope Benedict XVI appointed Bantolo as the Bishop of Masbate, succeeding Bishop Joel Baylon who was transferred to the Diocese of Legazpi in 2009. His episcopal consecration took place on August 22, 2011. He was formally installed in a ceremony led by the Apostolic Nuncio to the Philippines, Archbishop Giuseppe Pinto, at Masbate Cathedral on September 6, 2011.

Within the Catholic Bishops' Conference of the Philippines, he was the chairman of the Episcopal Commission on Culture from 2019 to 2023.

== Death ==
Bantolo died on December 13, 2025, at the age of 65.

Catholic Church titles
Preceded by Joel Z. Baylon	Bishop of Masbate; 2011–2025	Vacant
