= DZLC =

Philippine radio station

Cool FM (DZLC)
- Lipa; Philippines
- Broadcast area: Batangas and surrounding areas
- Frequency: 98.5 MHz
- Branding: 98.5 Cool FM

Programming
- Language: Filipino
- Format: Contemporary MOR, News, Talk

Ownership
- Owner: Apollo Broadcast Investors; (Mediascape Inc.)
- Sister stations: GV 99.9

History
- First air date: 2003
- Former names: Da Best (2003–2010); Big Radio (2019–2022)
- Call sign meaning: Lipa City

Technical information
- Licensing authority: NTC
- Class: BCDE
- Power: 5,000 watts

DZLC (98.5 FM), broadcasting as 98.5 Cool FM, is a radio station owned and operated by Apollo Broadcast Investors. The station's studio and transmitter are located at the 2nd floor, Astral Fuel Bldg., President Jose P. Laurel Hi-way, Brgy. Mataas na Lupa, Lipa, Batangas.

== History ==
The station was established in 2003 as Da Best with a mass-based format. It went off the air in September 2010. In 2019, it went back on air, this time as Big Radio under the management of Vanguard Radio Network. In late 2022, new management took over the station and rebranded it as Cool FM.
