= DWMV =

Defunct station in Legazpi, Philippines

- Legazpi; Philippines
- Broadcast area: Albay and surrounding areas
- Frequency: 89.1 MHz

Programming
- Format: Silent

Ownership
- Owner: Apollo Broadcast Investors; (Mediascape Inc.)

History
- First air date: March 2015
- Last air date: December 31, 2024
- Former names: Idol FM (2015-2024)
- Call sign meaning: Manny Villegas Galang

Technical information
- Licensing authority: NTC

DWMV (89.1 FM) was a radio station owned and operated by Apollo Broadcast Investors. It used to be known as Idol FM from its inception in March 2015 to December 31, 2024, when it went off the air. It was an affiliate of Radyo Bandera from late 2017 until July 29, 2018.
