= DWGV-FM =

Radio station in Angeles City, Pampanga, Philippines

GV 99.1 (DWGV)
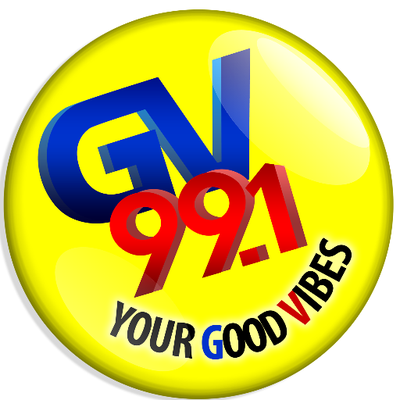
- Angeles City; Philippines
- Broadcast area: Central Luzon and surrounding areas
- Frequency: 99.1 MHz (HD Radio)
- Branding: GV 99.1

Programming
- Languages: English, Filipino
- Format: CHR/Top 40, OPM

Ownership
- Owner: Apollo Broadcast Investors; (Mediascape Inc.)
- Sister stations: GVAM 792

History
- First air date: November 7, 1983
- Call sign meaning: Galang and Villegas

Technical information
- Licensing authority: NTC
- Class: A/B/C/D/E
- Power: 5,000 watts
- ERP: 10,000 watts

Links
- Webcast: Listen Live (via Mixlr)

DWGV (99.1 FM), broadcasting as GV 99.1, is a radio station owned and operated by GV Radios Network Corporation, a subsidiary of Apollo Broadcast Investors, through its licensee MediaScape Inc. The station's studio is located at the 4th Floor, PG Building, MacArthur Highway, Balibago, Angeles City, and its transmitter is located at the Royal Golf And Country Club, Porac.

== History ==
DWGV-FM signed on November 7, 1983, by GV Broadcasting System under the foundation of Emmanuel "Manoling" Galang, a licensed Electronics and Communications Engineer. Originally intended as a training background for the students of Galang Technical Institute, it later became Angeles City's center of information for Central Luzon. GV also produced programs for most prominent personalities such as Ted Failon, Erwin Tulfo, and Daniel Razon among others.

GV's broadcast franchise under Republic Act 8169 was granted in 1995, and was later amended in 1998 allowing GV expanded its broadcast operations nationwide. A second GV station (DZGV) was launched in Galang's native hometown province Batangas, followed by an AM station (GVAM 792) Angeles. Other stations were applied and approved by NTC.

Until then, the GV FM 99.1 brand and its "Drive Radio" tagline were used until 2012 when the "FM" suffix was dropped and rechristened as GV 99.1 with a new slogan "Your Good Vibes".

In 2007, GV Broadcasting was acquired by MediaQuest Holdings, Inc., a media conglomerate owned by the PLDT's Beneficial Trust Fund, with the Galangs became part of the said firm. Since then, GV Broadcasting was renamed as Mediascape Inc. GV 99.1 became available nationwide on Mediascape's own DTH satellite service Cignal TV since its launch in 2009.

In 2009, management and operations of GV radio stations were transferred to a new entity Metro City Media Services (MCMS) before merging with cable TV operations of Apollo Global Corporation and became Apollo Broadcast Investors.

== Awards ==
Year	Awards	Category	Result	Ref.
2011	20th KBP Golden Dove Awards	Best FM Station - Provincial	Nominated	
2017	4th Paragala Awards	Best Local Radio Station	Won	
2018	5th Paragala Awards	Best Local Radio Station	Won	
2019	6th Paragala Awards	Best Local Radio Station	Won	
