= DYME-AM =

Philippine radio station

Radyo Masbate (DYME)
- Masbate City; Philippines
- Broadcast area: Masbate and surrounding areas
- Frequency: 783 kHz
- Branding: DYME 783 Radyo Masbate

Programming
- Languages: Masbateño, Filipino
- Format: News, Public Affairs, Talk
- Affiliations: Radio Mindanao Network; Intercontinental Broadcasting Corporation

Ownership
- Owner: Masbate Community Broadcasting Company
- Sister stations: 95.9 K5 News FM; IBC Channel 10 Masbate

History
- First air date: 1979
- Call sign meaning: Masbate

Technical information
- Licensing authority: NTC
- Power: 5,000 watts

Links
- Website: http://dymemasbate.com/

DYME (783 AM) Radyo Masbate is a radio station owned and operated by Masbate Community Broadcasting Company. Its studios & transmitter are located at DYME Bldg., Zurbito St., Brgy. Pating, Masbate City.
