= DZMD =

Defunct radio station

- Daet; Philippines
- Broadcast area: Camarines Norte and surrounding areas
- Frequency: 1161 kHz

Programming
- Format: Silent

Ownership
- Owner: PBN Broadcasting Network

History
- First air date: June 24, 1970
- Last air date: 2017
- Call sign meaning: Malayang Damdamin

Technical information
- Licensing authority: NTC

DZMD (1161 AM) was a radio station owned and operated by PBN Broadcasting Network.
