= Apollo Broadcast Investors =

Apollo Broadcast Investors, Inc.
- Type: Private
- Industry: Radio broadcasting, pay television
- Founded: 2014
- Headquarters: Makati, Philippines
- Key people: Emmanuel “Manny” V. Galang II (President and CEO)
- Brands: Pinoy Xtreme Channel
- Owner: Apollo Global Corporation; Mediascape, Inc. (non-controlling stake) (50% each)
- Subsidiaries: GV Radios Network Corporation; Allied Broadcasting Center
- Website: apollobroadcast.com

GV Radios Network Corporation
- Formerly: GV Broadcasting System (1983–2008); Metro City Media Services (2008–2014)
- Type: Private (subsidiary)
- Industry: Radio broadcasting
- Founded: November 7, 1983
- Founder: Emmanuel “Manoling” A. Galang
- Headquarters: Makati, Philippines
- Key people: Emmanuel “Manny” V. Galang II (President and CEO); Engr. Erwin V. Galang (Head, Regulatory and Industry Relations)
- Owner: Apollo Broadcast Investors
- Website: https://www.gvradios.com/

Apollo Broadcast Investors, Inc. is a broadcast media company. Its head offices are located at Unit 1703, Cityland 10, Tower 1, H.V. De la Costa St., Makati. Apollo Broadcast owns and represents 2 radio companies: GV Radios Network Corporation (also known as GV Broadcasting System), which operates its flagship stations GVAM 792 and GVFM 99.1 in Pampanga; and Allied Broadcasting Center. It also owns Pinoy Xtreme Channel, a 24-hour sports and entertainment channel.

== History ==
Prior to its current network, it was founded in 1983 as GV Broadcasting System by the Galang family. GV then operated its radio stations in Pampanga and later expanded in Batangas. GV's broadcast franchise was granted in 1995, and was later amended in 1998 allowing the inclusion of establishing its pay TV business.

In 2007, MediaQuest Holdings acquired a majority stake in GV and its parent Satventures, with the Galangs being part of MediaQuest. The Galangs later spun off its own radio assets into a new entity called Metro City Media Services.

In 2014, MCMS merged with the pay TV business of Apollo Global Corporation (the company whose associated with the Santa Ana racetrack owner Philippine Racing Club) to form Apollo Broadcast Investors. With this, the radio assets became GV Radios Network Corporation while keeping its only pay TV channel Pinoy Xtreme.

== Properties ==
=== Radio ===
Note: Mediascape serves as the licensee of these following stations.

Branding	Callsign	Frequency	Location	Notes
GVAM	DWGV-AM	792 kHz	Angeles City	Under GV Radios Network.
GVFM Pampanga	DWGV-FM	99.1 MHz	Angeles City	Under GV Radios Network.
K5 News FM Santiago	DZRI	100.1 MHz	Santiago	Operated by 5K Broadcasting Network.
K5 News FM Olongapo	DZIV	88.7 MHz	Olongapo	Operated by 5K Broadcasting Network.
GVFM Batangas	DZGV	99.9 MHz	Batangas City	Under GV Radios Network.
Cool FM	DZLC	98.5 MHz	Lipa	Operated by the City Government of Lipa.
Jungle Radio	DWGD	100.7 MHz	Puerto Princesa	—N/a
Radyo Jagna	DYMA	100.9 MHz	Jagna	Operated by Radyo Bol-Anon Network.

Former stations

Callsign	Frequency	Location	Status
DWEG	89.5 MHz	Sto. Tomas	Off the air after transmitter was destroyed by Tropical Storm Usman in December 2018.
DWEV	88.9 MHz	Daet	Off the air since January 1, 2025.
DWMV	89.1 MHz	Legazpi	Off the air since January 1, 2025.
DWRG	105.5 MHz	Naga	License transferred to Allied Broadcasting Center.

=== Pinoy Xtreme ===
Pinoy Xtreme
- Country: Philippines
- Broadcast area: Philippines
- Headquarters: Makati, Philippines

Programming
- Languages: Filipino; English
- Picture format: 1080i 16:9 (HDTV)

Ownership
- Owner: Apollo Broadcast Investors, Inc

History
- Launched: May 1, 2003
- Former names: Prime Channel (2003-2006); Viva Prime Channel (2006–2010)

Pinoy Xtreme is a 24-hour sports and entertainment cable channel. It is available via Channel 106 on Cignal (Nationwide), Channel 88 on G Sat (Nationwide), Channel 217 on SkyCable in Metro Manila, Channel 59 on Cablelink in Metro Manila and in various pay TV providers in key provinces.

Pinoy Xtreme's current programming consists of a variety of sports (boxing, extreme/combat sports, and cockfighting) and acquired programming from Leader News Philippines (such as Kamaong Asero), as well as other entertainment and educational programming. In some cases, the channel is timeshared with the live racetrack broadcasts of MJCI, MetroTurf and (the channel's former partner) PRCI, thus pre-empting its programming during live racing coverages at the discretion of a local pay TV provider.
