= DYME-FM =

Philippine radio station

K5 News FM Masbate (DYME)
- Masbate City; Philippines
- Broadcast area: Masbate and surrounding areas
- Frequency: 95.9 MHz
- Branding: 95.9 K5 News FM

Programming
- Languages: Masbateño, Filipino
- Format: Contemporary MOR, News, Talk
- Network: K5 News FM
- Affiliations: Abante; Bilyonaryo News Channel; Intercontinental Broadcasting Corporation; Radio Mindanao Network

Ownership
- Owner: Masbate Community Broadcasting Company
- Operator: 5K Broadcasting Network
- Sister stations: DYME Radyo Masbate; IBC Channel 10 Masbate City

History
- First air date: 1990
- Call sign meaning: Masbate

Technical information
- Licensing authority: NTC
- Power: 1,000 watts
- ERP: 2,625 watts

Links
- Website: http://dymemasbate.com/

DYME (95.9 FM), broadcasting as 95.9 K5 News FM, is a radio station owned by Masbate Community Broadcasting Company and operated by 5K Broadcasting Network. Its studios & transmitter are located at DYME Bldg., Zurbito St., Brgy. Pating, Masbate City. Despite being operated by 5K, it remains affiliated with Radio Mindanao Network for news programs from DWNX.
