= DWWV =

Ratsada News FM (DWWV)
- Iriga; Philippines
- Broadcast area: Camarines Sur, Northern Albay
- Frequency: 96.7 MHz
- Branding: 96.7 Ratsada News FM

Programming
- Languages: Rinconada, Filipino
- Format: Contemporary MOR, News, Talk

Ownership
- Owner: Allied Broadcasting Center

History
- First air date: September 5, 2012
- Former call signs: DWJV (2012–2021)
- Former names: Radyo Amigo (September 5, 2012-December 2016); Good Vibes Radio (February 28, 2019-February 20, 2024); Rinconada News FM (February 21, 2024-August 3, 2025)

Technical information
- Licensing authority: NTC
- Class: C, D, E
- Power: 5 kW
- ERP: 10 kW

96.7 Ratsada News FM (DWWV 96.7 MHz) is an FM station owned and operated by Allied Broadcasting Center. Its studios and transmitter are located at the 3rd Floor, Everest Bldg., Brgy. San Miguel, Iriga.
