= DZGB-AM =

Radio station in Legazpi, Philippines

DZGB
- Legazpi; Philippines
- Broadcast area: Albay and surrounding areas
- Frequency: 729 kHz
- Branding: DZGB 729

Programming
- Languages: Bikol, Filipino
- Format: News, Public Affairs, Talk

Ownership
- Owner: PBN Broadcasting Network
- Sister stations: 97.1 OKFM; DWGB-TV

History
- First air date: October 24, 1958
- Former frequencies: 720 kHz (1958–1978)
- Call sign meaning: George Bayona

Technical information
- Licensing authority: NTC
- Power: 10,000 watts

Links
- Website: www.pbnbicol.com

DZGB (729 AM) is a radio station owned and operated by PBN Broadcasting Network. Its studios and transmitter are located at the 3rd Floor, Bayona Bldg., Imperial Court Subd. Phase 1, Legazpi, Albay. It operates daily from 4:45 AM to 9:50 PM except during coverage of major typhoons passing the Bicol region when the station remains on-air.

== History ==
DZGB traces its roots to Bicol Wire Broadcasting System (BWBS), established in 1958 by Jorge D. Bayona (b. 1926 - 2025) as Legazpi City's pioneering radio station. It earned the name Radyo Balagon due to the usage of cable wires for their broadcasts—the only station in the area to do so. Its initial programming consisted mostly of entertainment shows and radio drama with Bicolano vernacular scripts.

BWBS' successor, DZGB, was established in 1960 as a separate commercial station, while converting to the aircast style to cope with the competition during the years prior to the 1972 declaration of the nationwide martial law. Thereafter, the station was among the three in the city which were able to operate; as BWBS had been subsumed and restructured into the current PBN Broadcasting Network.

== News operation ==
As of 2025, DZGB provides 42 hours of its weekly overall program grid to news/talk with programs hosted by government agencies, religious shows and music on other times of the day.

DZGB is notable for its unique wall-to-wall coverage of typhoons passing through the Bicol region by forgoing its evening sign-off, whereas its competitors maintain an overnight dormancy for safety of its personnel and equipment.
