= Diocese of Masbate =

Latin Catholic diocese in the Philippines

Diocese of Masbate Dioecesis Masbatensis Diyosesis san Masbate Diyosesis ng Masbate Diócesis de Masbate

Catholic
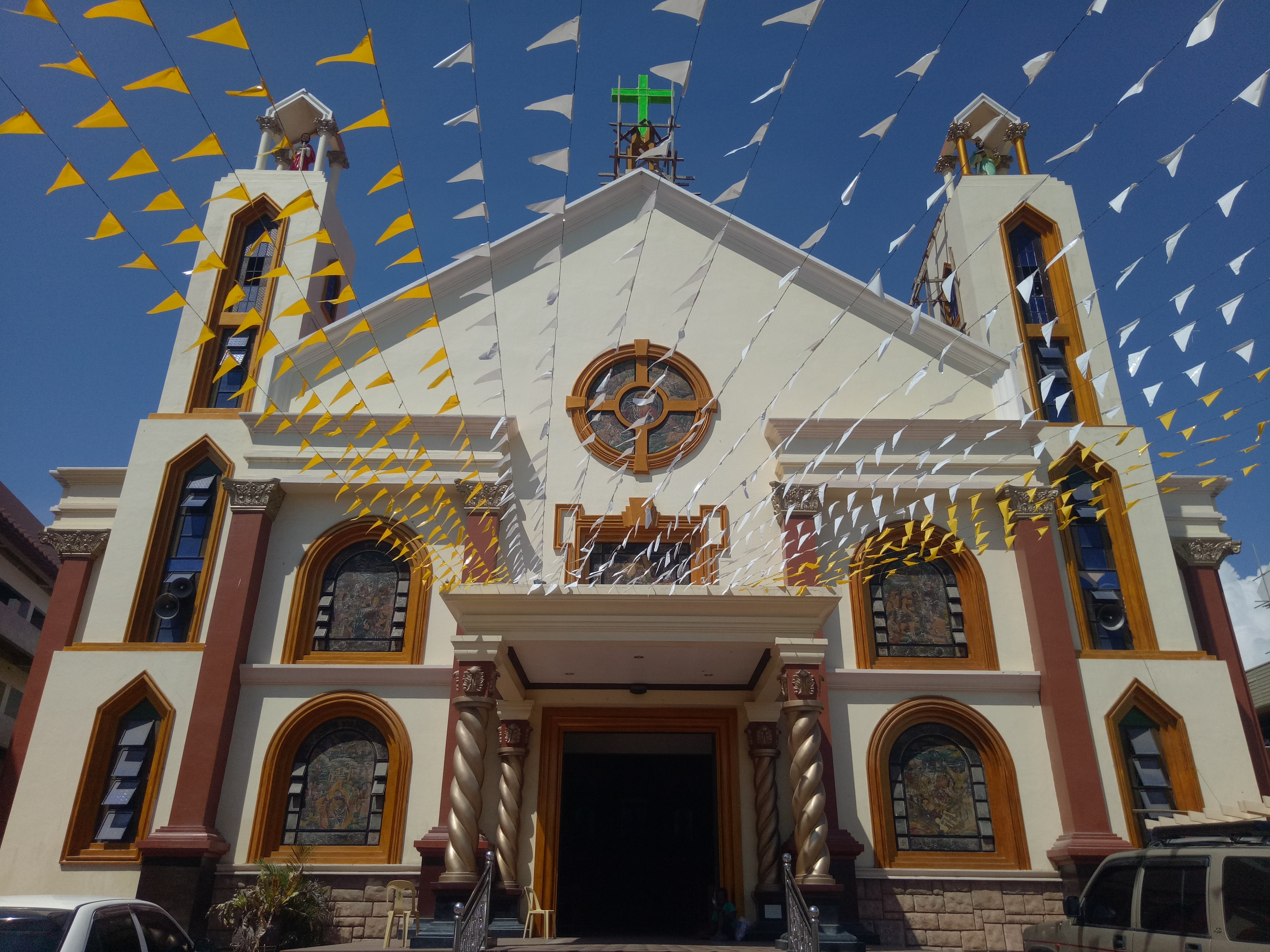
- Masbate Cathedral

- Coat of arms

Location
- Country: Philippines
- Territory: Masbate
- Ecclesiastical province: Caceres
- Metropolitan: Caceres
- Coordinates: 12°22′08″N 123°37′08″E

Statistics
- Area: 7,000 km^{2} (2,700 sq mi)
- Population: Total; Catholics: (as of 2021); 983,172; 917,532 (93.3%)
- Parishes: 35

Information
- Denomination: Catholic
- Sui iuris church: Latin Church
- Rite: Roman Rite
- Established: March 23, 1968 (created), September 25, 1968 (canonically erected)
- Cathedral: Saint Anthony of Padua Cathedral
- Patron saint: Anthony of Padua
- Secular priests: 60

Current leadership
- Pope: Leo XIV
- Bishop: Sede vacante
- Metropolitan Archbishop: Archbishop Rex Andrew Alarcon
- Vicar General: Eusebio Llonoso

Map
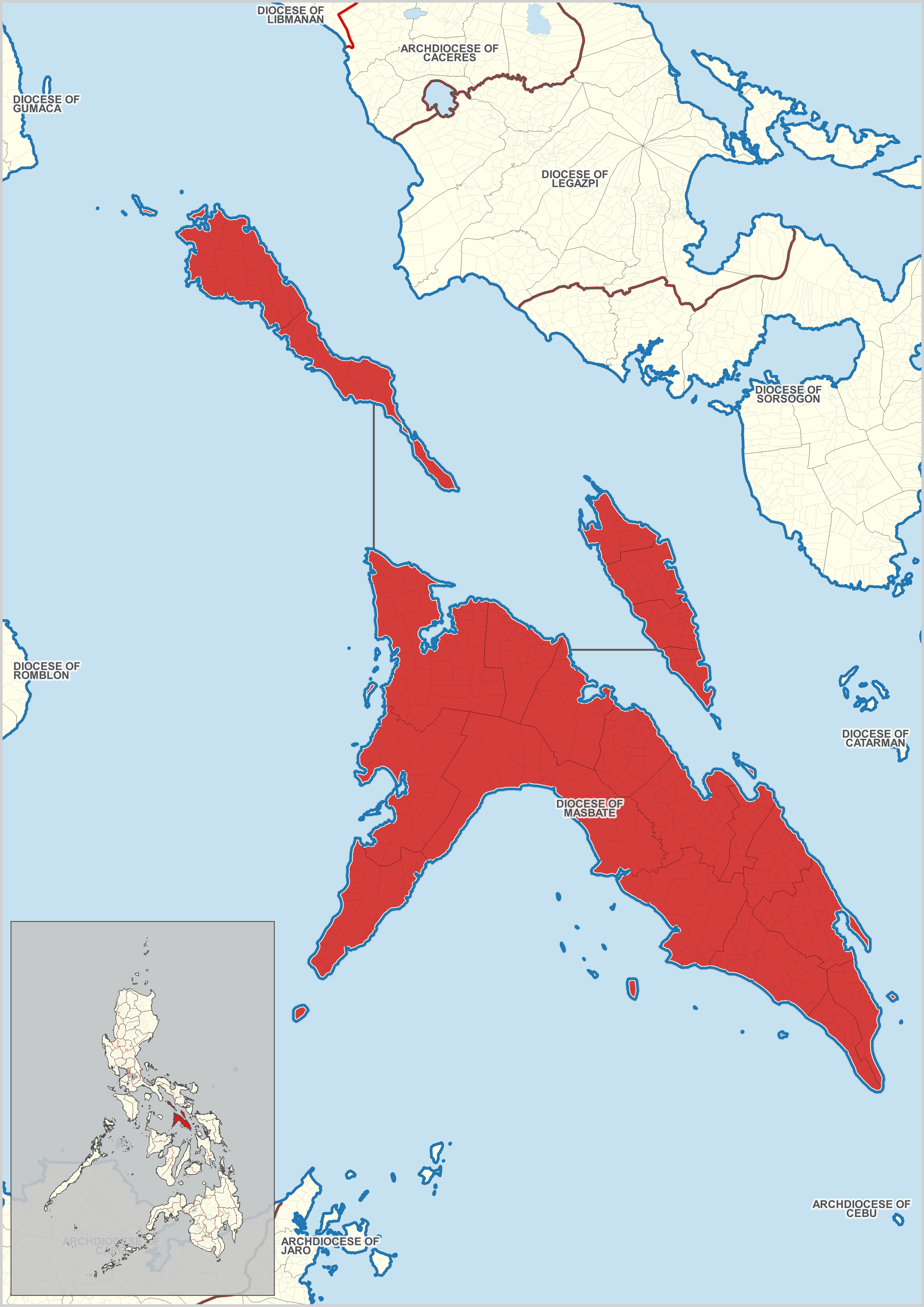
- Territorial jurisdiction of the Diocese of Masbate

The Diocese of Masbate (Latin: Dioecesis Masbatensis) is a diocese of the Latin Church of the Catholic Church in the Philippines. The seat of the bishop is the Cathedral Parish of Saint Anthony of Padua along Quezon Street, Masbate City.

The diocese has experienced no jurisdictional changes and is suffragan to the Archdiocese of Cáceres. Its patron is Saint Anthony of Padua.

The former coat of arms of the Diocese of Masbate features an island topped with a church upon an agitated sea, in canton a book and lily, the symbols of St. Anthony of Padua.

== History ==
With the other provinces of Bicol, Masbate once belonged to the Archdiocese of Cáceres. When Cáceres was elevated to the status of an archdiocese on June 29, 1951, Masbate became part of the newly erected Diocese of Sorsogon. Pope Paul VI created the Diocese of Masbate on March 23, 1968. It was formally inaugurated on September 25, 1968, with Porfírio Rivera Iligan, a priest from the Archdiocese of Cáceres, as its first bishop.

== Ordinaries ==
No.	Name	From	Until	Consecrated bishop	Coat of arms
1	Porfirio Rivera Iligan	June 17, 1968 (appointed)	February 14, 1998 (retired)	September 3, 1968	
2	Joel Zamudio Baylon	February 14, 1998 (appointed)	October 1, 2009 (appointed as bishop of Legazpi)	March 25, 1998	
3	Jose Salmorin Bantolo	June 15, 2011 (appointed)	December 13, 2025 (died in office)	August 22, 2011	
Sede vacante (since December 13, 2025)

== Vicars-general ==
The vicar-general assists the bishop in the administrative duties over the diocese. The offices of the vicar-general and the episcopal vicars temporarily ceased upon the vacancy of the episcopal see.

- Anacleto Golimlim (†)
- Arturo Lachica (†)
- Claro Caluya III (1984–2009)
- Ismael Misolas (2009)
- Eusebio Llonoso (2011–present)

== See also ==
- Catholic Church in the Philippines

== Resources ==
- The 2010–2011 Catholic Directory of the Philippines (published by Claretian Publications for the Catholic Bishops' Conference of the Philippines, 2010)
