= DWGB =

Radio station in Legazpi, Philippines

OKFM Legazpi (DWGB)
- Legazpi; Philippines
- Broadcast area: Albay and surrounding areas
- Frequency: 97.1 MHz
- Branding: 97.1 OKFM

Programming
- Languages: Albayanon, Filipino
- Format: Contemporary MOR, OPM
- Network: OKFM Bicol

Ownership
- Owner: PBN Broadcasting Network
- Sister stations: DZGB

History
- First air date: April 10, 1987
- Call sign meaning: George Bayona

Technical information
- Licensing authority: NTC
- Power: 5,000 watts

Links
- Webcast: OKFM Live

DWGB (97.1 FM), broadcasting as 97.1 OKFM, is a radio station owned and operated by PBN Broadcasting Network. It serves as the flagship station of the OKFM network. Its studios are located at the 3rd Floor, Bayona Bldg., Imperial Court Subd. Phase 1, Legazpi, Albay, and its transmitter is located at Brgy. Taysan, Legazpi, Albay.
