= DWJX =

OKFM Sorsogon (DWJX)
- Sorsogon City; Philippines
- Broadcast area: Sorsogon and surrounding areas
- Frequency: 89.5 MHz
- Branding: 89.5 OKFM

Programming
- Languages: Bicolano, Filipino
- Format: Contemporary MOR, OPM
- Network: OKFM Bicol

Ownership
- Owner: PBN Broadcasting Network

History
- First air date: 1970 (on AM); March 6, 2017 (on FM)
- Former call signs: DZMS (1970-February 2017)
- Former frequencies: 1251 kHz (1970-February 2017)

Technical information
- Licensing authority: NTC
- Power: 5,000 watts

Links
- Webcast: OKFM Live

DWJX (89.5 FM), broadcasting as 89.5 OKFM, is a radio station owned and operated by PBN Broadcasting Network. Its studios and transmitter are located on the 4th Floor of the ABA Building, Brgy. Talisay, Sorsogon City.
