= DWGV-AM =

Radio station in Angeles City, Pampanga, Philippines

GVAM (DWGV)
Angeles City; Philippines
- Broadcast area: Pampanga and surrounding areas
- Frequency: 792 kHz
- Branding: GVAM 792

Programming
- Languages: Kapampangan, Filipino
- Format: News, Public Affairs, Talk

Ownership
- Owner: GV Radios Network Corporation; (Mediascape Inc.)
- Sister stations: GV 99.1

History
- First air date: June 3, 1996
- Call sign meaning: Galang and Villegas

Technical information
- Licensing authority: NTC
- Power: 5,000 watts

Links
- Webcast: http://www.ustream.tv/channel/gvam

DWGV (792 AM), broadcasting as GVAM 792, is a radio station owned and operated by GV Radios Network Corporation, a subsidiary of Apollo Broadcast Investors through its licensee Cignal TV/MediaScape Inc. The station's studio are located at the 4th Floor, PG Building, McArthur Highway, Barangay Balibago, and its transmitter is located at Sitio Target, Sapangbato, Angeles City. It is the only AM radio station in Pampanga.

== Awards ==
Year	Awards	Category	Recipient	Result	Ref.
2011	20th KBP Golden Dove Awards	Best Public Affairs Program - Provincial	Aksyon Central Luzon	Nominated	
