= DZOK-FM =

FM station in Naga, Camarines Sur, Philippines

OKFM Naga (DZOK)
- Naga; Philippines
- Broadcast area: Camarines Sur and surrounding areas
- Frequency: 97.5 MHz
- Branding: 97.5 OKFM

Programming
- Languages: Bicolano, Filipino
- Format: Contemporary MOR, News, Talk
- Network: OKFM Bicol

Ownership
- Owner: PBN Broadcasting Network
- Sister stations: DZGB-TV

History
- First air date: 1995
- Former names: DZOK Talk & News FM (February 2011-June 2013)
- Call sign meaning: OK FM

Technical information
- Licensing authority: NTC
- Power: 5 kW

Links
- Website: www.pbnbicol.com

97.5 OK FM (DZOK 97.5 MHz) is an FM station owned and operated by PBN Broadcasting Network. Its studios and transmitter are located at Star C Bldg., Magsaysay Avenue, Naga, Camarines Sur.
