= DWAW-FM =

Radio station in Sorsogon, Philippines

Wow Smile Radio (DWAW)
Sorsogon City; Philippines
- Broadcast area: Sorsogon and surrounding areas
- Frequency: 99.9 MHz
- Branding: 99.9 Wow Smile Radio

Programming
- Languages: Bicolano, Filipino
- Format: Contemporary MOR, News, Talk
- Affiliations: Radio Mindanao Network

Ownership
- Owner: Allied Broadcasting Center
- Operator: Wow Smile Media Services

History
- First air date: 2014 (as DWQS); 2022 (as DWAW-FM)
- Former call signs: DWQS (2014–2022)
- Former frequencies: 107.3 MHz (2014–2022)

Technical information
- Licensing authority: NTC
- Class: D / E
- Power: 1,000 watts
- ERP: 2,100 watts

DWAW (99.9 FM), broadcasting as 99.9 Wow Smile Radio, is a radio station owned by Allied Broadcasting Center and operated by Wow Smile Media Services. Its studios and transmitter are located at Madrileña St., Roseville Subd., Brgy. Bibincahan, Sorsogon City.

== History ==
The station was established in 2014 on Radio Sorsogon Network-owned 107.3 FM. On June 13, 2022, it took over Allied Broadcasting Center's 99.9 FM, which was formerly occupied by Padaba FM.
