= DZEV =

Philippine radio station

Radyo Polangui (DZEV)
Polangui; Philippines
- Broadcast area: Northern Albay, Southern Camarines Sur
- Frequency: 102.7 MHz
- Branding: 102.7 Radyo Polangui

Programming
- Languages: Albayanon, Filipino
- Format: Community radio

Ownership
- Owner: Allied Broadcasting Center

History
- First air date: 2002
- Former call signs: DWJJ (2002-August 25, 2019); DWJZ (2019-2024)
- Former names: Hot FM (2002–2015)
- Former frequencies: 96.7 MHz (2002–2010); 97.9 MHz (2010-August 25, 2019)

Technical information
- Licensing authority: NTC
- Power: 5,000 watts

DZEV (102.7 FM), broadcasting as 102.7 Radyo Polangui, is a radio station owned and operated by Allied Broadcasting Center. Its studios are located at the 2nd Floor, Polangui Commercial Arcade, Brgy. Basud, Polangui.

The station was formerly owned by Manila Broadcasting Company under the Hot FM network from 2002 to 2015.
