= DZGV =

Radio station in Batangas, Philippines

GV 99.9 (DZGV)
- Mataasnakahoy; Philippines
- Broadcast area: Southern Luzon and surrounding areas
- Frequency: 99.9 MHz
- Branding: GV 99.9

Programming
- Languages: English, Filipino
- Format: CHR, OPM

Ownership
- Owner: Apollo Broadcast Investors; (Mediascape Inc.)
- Sister stations: 98.5 Cool FM

History
- First air date: February 24, 1996
- Call sign meaning: Galang and Villegas

Technical information
- Licensing authority: NTC
- Class: A/B/C/D/E
- Power: 5,000 watts
- ERP: 10,000 watts

DZGV (99.9 FM), broadcasting as GV 99.9, is a radio station owned and operated by GV Radios Network Corporation, a subsidiary of Apollo Broadcast Investors. The station's studio is located at the 2nd floor, Cristina Bldg., V.Templo St., Mataasnakahoy; while its transmitter is located atop of Mt. Banoy, Batangas City.

GV 99.9 formerly had a sister station based in Sto. Tomas with the call letters DWEG. Initially known as Smile 89.5, it first signed on in 2010 to serve the extreme northern Batangas and western Laguna market. In March 2018, it was converted into a relay of GV 99.9, thus carrying the branding GV 99.9. It went off the air in late 2018 due to cost-cutting measures and its transmitter being disabled by Tropical Storm Usman.
