= Masbate Cathedral =

Roman Catholic church in Masbate, Philippines

St. Anthony of Padua Cathedral
- Saint Anthony of Padua Cathedral
- Catedral Parroquial de San Antonio de Padua (Spanish)
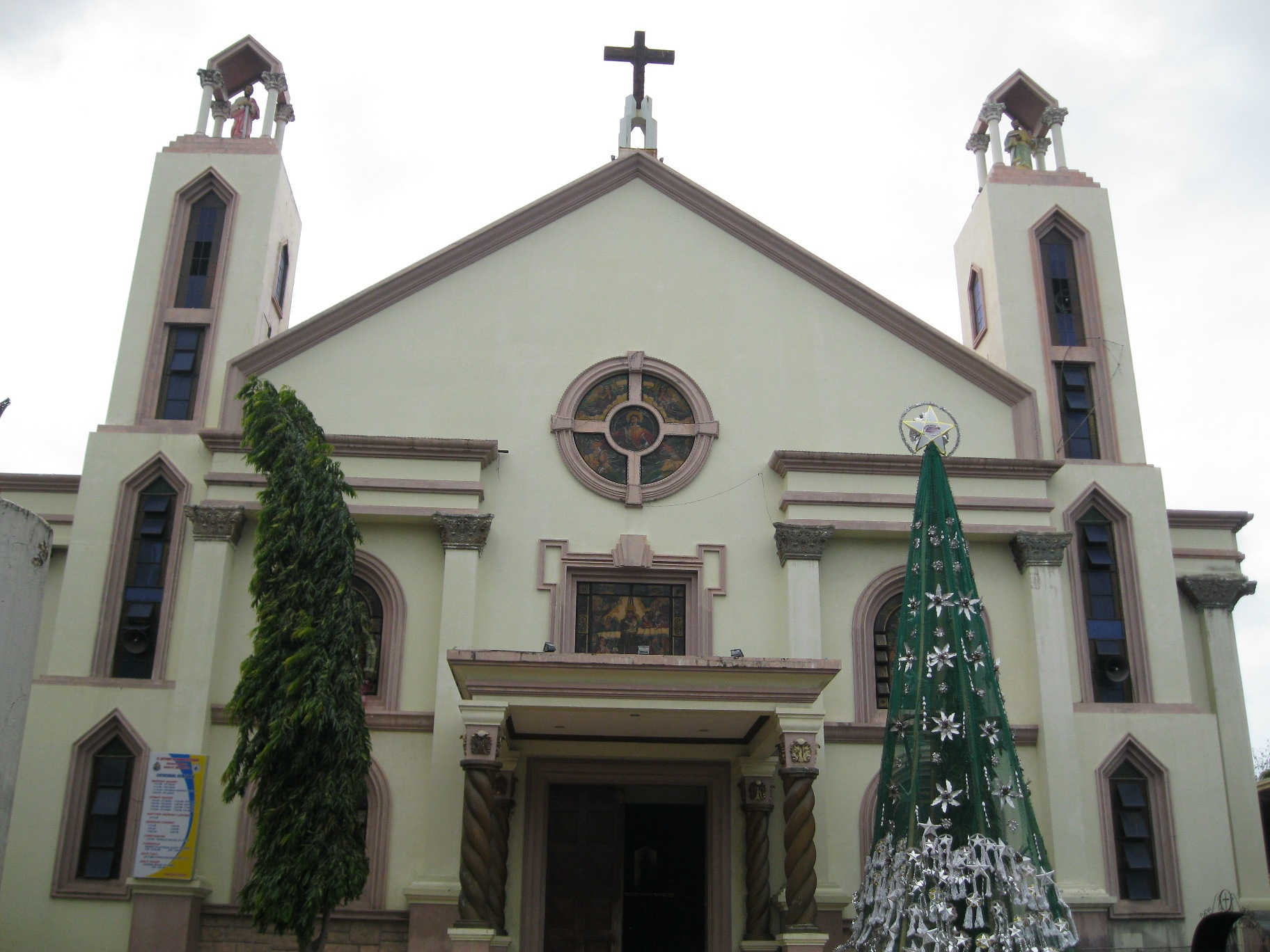
- Cathedral facade in 2010

- Location in Luzon island group Location in the Philippines
- 12°22′07″N 123°37′08″E
- Location: Masbate City, Masbate
- Country: Philippines
- Denomination: Roman Catholic

History
- Status: Cathedral
- Founded: 1578
- Dedication: Saint Anthony of Padua

Architecture
- Functional status: Active
- Architectural type: Church building
- Style: Baroque

Administration
- Division: Vicariate of Saint Anthony of Padua
- Archdiocese: Caceres
- Diocese: Masbate

Clergy
- Bishop: Jose Salmorin Bantolo
- Rector: Fr. Ely M. Alvarez

Saint Anthony of Padua Cathedral, commonly known as Masbate Cathedral, is a Roman Catholic church located along Quezon Street in Masbate City, Masbate, Philippines. Founded in 1578 by Spanish missionaries, it is presently the cathedral or seat of the Diocese of Masbate. The present pastor and rector of the cathedral is Rev. Fr. Ely M. Alvarez.

== History ==
The parish was founded in 1578 by Spanish missionaries, who placed the new church under the patronage of the Archdiocese of Nueva España. With the canonical erection of the first local church in the Philippines in 1581, it became part of the Diocese of Manila. In 1595, it became part of the newly established Diocese of Nueva Cáceres when the Bicol region was given its own local church. In 1951, the parish became part of the newly erected Diocese of Sorsogon, of which the Most Rev. Teopisto Alberto was its first bishop. Then parish priest Msgr. Arnulfo Arcilla (later made bishop of Sorsogon) laid down the foundation of the first structures of the cathedral-parish in 1954. On March 23, 1968, the civil province of Masbate was declared an independent diocese from Sorsogon, and Saint Anthony of Padua Parish was made the cathedral or seat of the Diocese of Masbate.

A major repair on the building was done during the administration of the first Bishop of Masbate, the Most Rev. Porfirio R. Iligan. Expansions and other improvements followed later under the supervision of its succeeding cathedral rectors. The present cathedral structure preserves the center floor, the aisle, and some vestiges of the cross-shaped part of the ceiling as a result of Bishop Joel Baylon's call for church renovation. The cathedral was blessed and dedicated on September 25, 2004.

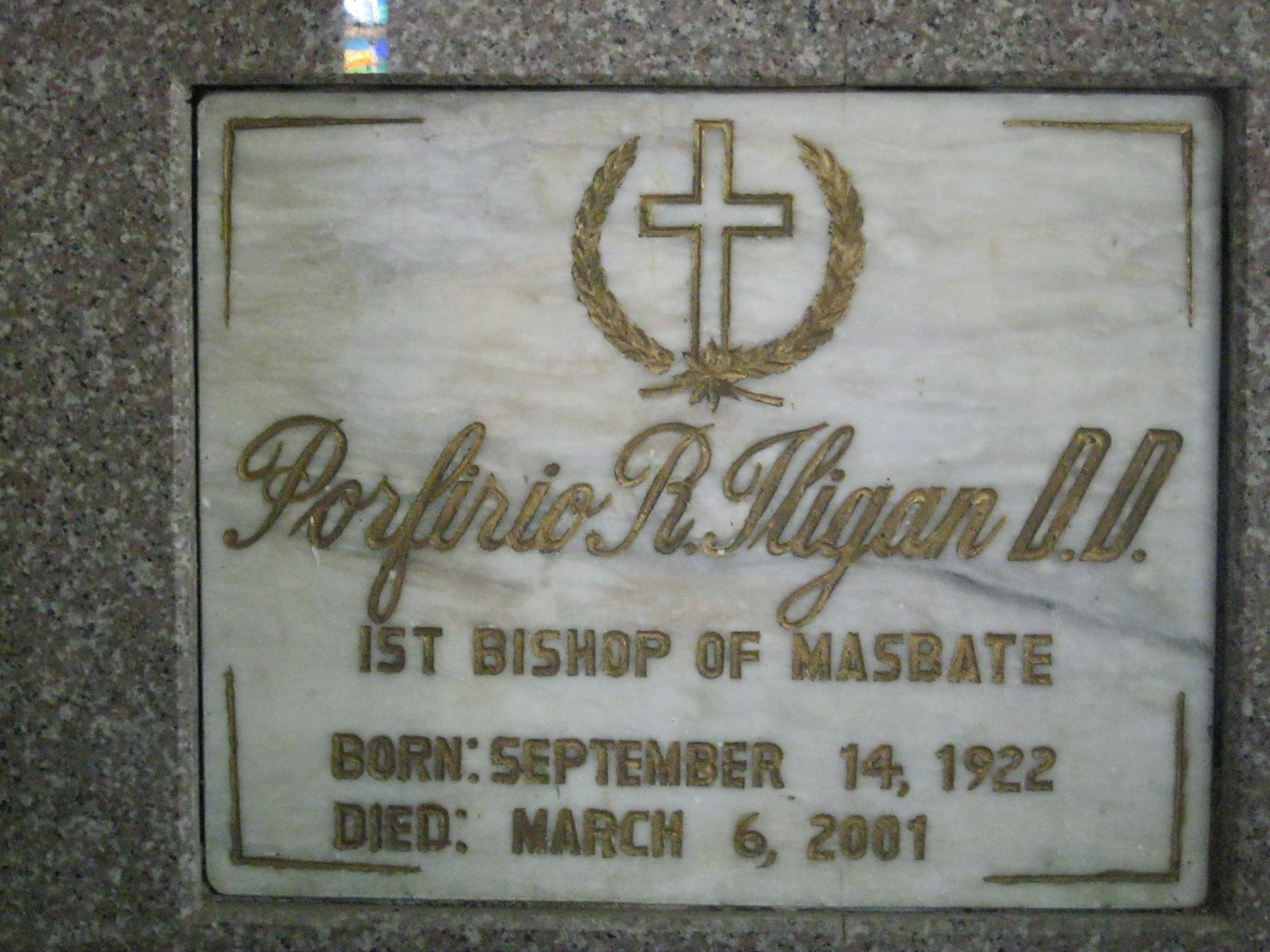
Crypt of Rev. Porfirio R. Iligan

== Pastors ==
Below is the recent list of parish priests / cathedral rectors.

Name	Years of Pastorship	Present Assignment
Most Rev. Arnulfo Arcilla	1959	deceased Bishop-emeritus of Sorsogon
Most Rev. Vicente Ataviado	1959 to 1968	deceased Bishop of Maasin
Rev. Msgr. Ernesto Villaroya, P.C.	1988	in the United States
Rev. Msgr. Claro V. Caluya III, H.P. (Msgr. Boy)	1988 to 1999	Resident Priest, Saint Nicholas of Tolentine Parish (Mobo, Masbate)
Rev. Msgr. Quintin C. Ferraren Jr., H.P.	1999 to 2004	retired
Rev. Msgr. Aquino T. Atendido, H.P.	2004 to 2009	retired
Rev. Msgr. Ismael B. Misolas, P.C.	2009 to 2014	Retired Guest Priest of Mary Immaculate Parish, also known as "Nature Church"
Rev. Fr. Lorenzo V. Bautista	2014 to 2019	Parish Priest of St. Patrick Parish
Rev. Fr. Ely Alvarez	2019-present	current Rector

== Resources ==
- The 2016–2017 Catholic Directory of the Philippines (published by Claretian Publications for the Catholic Bishops' Conference of the Philippines, June 2016)
