= PBN Broadcasting Network =

Media network in Bicol Region, Philippines

PBN Broadcasting Network Inc.
- Type: Private company
- Industry: Broadcast radio network
- Predecessor: People's Broadcasting Network
- Founded: October 24, 1958
- Headquarters: Corporate Offices; Eesan Bldg., #32 Quezon Ave., Quezon City; Broadcast Headquarters; 3rd Floor, Bayona Bldg., Imperial Court Subdivision - Phase 1, Legazpi, Albay
- Key people: Jorge Bayona; Founder; Brenda Bayona-Locsin; President; Glenn J. Barcelon; Executive Vice President and Concurrent Station Manager for DZGB-AM; Henry A. Maceda; Vice President for Network Programming
- Website: www.pbnbicol.com

PBN Broadcasting Network, Inc. is a Philippine media network representing the Bicol Region. Its corporate office is located at the 3rd floor, Eesan Bldg., #32 Quezon Ave., Quezon City while the network's flagship broadcast operations are located at the 3rd Floor, Bayona Bldg., Imperial Court Subdivision - Phase 1, Legazpi, Albay.

== History ==
PBN was originally established by Jorge D. Bayona on October 24, 1958, as the Bicol Wire Broadcasting System (BWBS). At the outset, Legazpi and the province of Albay had only heard radio through faint broadcast signals from Manila-based stations, especially at night when skywave propagation expanded the range of AM stations beyond their immediate communities. BWBS pioneered the broadcast industry in the Bicol region by operating the first cable radio station that became affectionately called by its listeners as "Radyo Balagon."

At the height of its popularity, Radyo Balagon initially served 3,000 households in Legazpi and the neighboring town of Daraga, Albay. With the continuous increase of subscribers, its area of coverage was expanded to the 1st district of Albay via a cable-relay station in the then-municipality of Tabaco.

With the success of Bicol Wire Broadcasting System (BWBS), and although technology was still in its infancy in the 60s, Bicol Wire Broadcasting System evolved into People's Broadcasting System with the establishment of DZGB-AM, the pioneer commercial radio station in Legazpi.

DZGB proved to be the first of a string of AM stations. Subsequently, a sister station purely dedicated to news and music was opened and named DZGM, the first AM station to adopt an FM-styled programming of less talk and more music. On June 24, 1970, DZMD-AM was inaugurated in Daet, Camarines Norte. Two years later, DZMS-AM started broadcasting in the province of Sorsogon. The household name of People's Broadcasting System became People's Broadcasting Network (PBN) to reflect its founder's intent to serve its fellow Bicolanos region-wide.

The declaration of martial law on September 21, 1972, was the darkest moment in broadcast history. All radio and TV stations nationwide were shut down, and PBN was among the casualties. DZGB Legazpi was immediately allowed to resume its broadcast operation one day after the shutdown order, followed by DZMD Daet, Camarines Norte, two days later and DZMS Sorsogon after a week.

In 1987, 97.1 DWGB-FM Legazpi aired its maiden broadcast. Barely six months later, it made history when it dominated the local surveys as the most listened-to FM station in the area. DWGB-FM would serve as the flagship of the regional OKFM network

With the advent of the 90s, the network began to consider a move to television. Realizing the need for a national network with a strong programming capability, PBN entered into and became an affiliate of ABC 5 (now TV5). On March 3, 1995, PBN's dream of operating its own TV station became a reality. Its local TV shows took Naga City by storm, and other local networks found it a worthy competitor.

Inspired by the huge success of DWGB-FM in Legazpi City, PBN decided to open another FM station in a more competitive market—Naga—on July 3, 1995.

With the establishment of PBN TV 5 in Naga, it was just a matter of time before the second TV station was opened. In June 1995, PBN TV 6 was born in Legaspi. In the same year, People's Broadcasting Network changed its corporate name to PBN Broadcasting Network, Inc., with three AM stations, two FM stations, and two television stations strategically positioned in the key cities and provinces in the region that practically covers the entire Bicolandia.

== PBN stations ==
=== Radio stations ===
==== AM stations ====
| Callsign | Frequency | Location |
|---|---|---|
| DZGB | 729 kHz | Legazpi |

==== FM stations ====
| Branding | Callsign | Frequency | Location |
|---|---|---|---|
| OKFM Naga | DZOK | 97.5 MHz | Naga |
| OKFM Daet | DWJL | 98.5 MHz | Daet |
| OKFM Legazpi | DWGB | 97.1 MHz | Legazpi |
| OKFM Sorsogon | DWJX | 89.5 MHz | Sorsogon City |
| WGB FM | DWPT | 106.9 MHz | Tabaco |
| OKFM Sogod | DYLX | 102.1 MHz | Sogod |

=== Defunct/Inactive ===
==== Radio ====
| Callsign | Frequency | Location | Status |
|---|---|---|---|
| DZMD-AM | 1161 kHz | Daet, Camarines Norte | Migrated to FM under the OKFM network. |
| DZMS-AM | 1251 kHz | Sorsogon City | Migrated to FM under the OKFM network. |

==== Television ====
| Callsign | Channel (Analog) | Location | Status |
|---|---|---|---|
| DZGB-TV | 5 | Naga, Camarines Sur | Defunct since 2020. |
| DWGB-TV | 6 | Legazpi City | Defunct since 2020. |
