= DWCZ =

Radio station in Legazpi, Philippines

Spirit FM Legazpi (DWCZ)
- Legazpi; Philippines
- Broadcast area: Albay and surrounding areas
- Frequency: 94.7 MHz
- Branding: 94.7 Spirit FM

Programming
- Language: English
- Format: CHR/Top 40, OPM, Religious Radio
- Affiliations: Catholic Media Network

Ownership
- Owner: Diocesan Multi-Media Services, Inc.
- Sister stations: Veritas 1008

History
- First air date: November 22, 2011
- Call sign meaning: Catholic Zita

Technical information
- Licensing authority: NTC
- Class: A, B, C+
- Power: 10,000 watts

Links
- Webcast: Listen Live

DWCZ (94.7 FM), broadcasting as 94.7 Spirit FM, is a radio station owned and operated by Diocesan Multimedia Services, Inc., the media arm of the Diocese of Legazpi. Its studio and transmitter is located at the DMSI Hub (Old St. Jude Catholic School Compound), Sol's Subdivision, Brgy. Bitano, Legazpi, Albay. It is the only FM station in Albay and the only CMN Spirit station airing a Top 40 format.
