= DZBA =

Radyo Mabini (DZBA)
- Daet; Philippines
- Broadcast area: Daet
- Frequency: 106.1 MHz
- Branding: Radyo Mabini

Programming
- Languages: English, Filipino
- Format: College radio

Ownership
- Owner: Mabini Colleges

Technical information
- Licensing authority: NTC
- Power: 10 w

DZBA (106.1 FM) Radyo Mabini is a radio station owned and operated by Mabini Colleges under the College of Liberal Arts. Its studios and transmitter are located along Gov. Panotes Ave., Daet.
