= DWRG =

Defunct radio station in Naga, Camarines Sur, Philippines

Zoom Radio (DWRG)
- Naga; Philippines
- Broadcast area: Camarines Sur and surrounding areas
- Frequency: 105.5 MHz
- RDS: ZOOM FM
- Branding: 105.5 Zoom Radio

Programming
- Languages: Bicolano, Filipino
- Format: Contemporary MOR, News, Talk

Ownership
- Owner: Allied Broadcasting Center

History
- First air date: August 23, 2018
- Former names: Idol FM (2018-2024); Radyo Gwapito (2025-2026)

Technical information
- Licensing authority: NTC
- Power: 5,000 watts

DWRG (105.5 FM), broadcasting as 105.5 Zoom Radio, is a radio station owned and operated by Allied Broadcasting Center. Its studios and transmitter are located at Ralik Bldg., Queborac Drive, Brgy. Bagumbayan Sur, Naga, Camarines Sur.

== History ==
The station first went on air on September 8, 2018 as Idol FM. During its existence, it was located in J. Abucar Bldg. in Brgy. Mabolo. On December 31, 2024, it signed off for the last time, along with the other Idol FM stations. In June 2025, it went back on air, this time as Radyo Gwapito under the management of BGR Media Productions. During its existence, it was located along Roxas Ave. in Brgy. Tabuco. On July 20, 2026, it was taken off the air due to unpaid blocktime fees and salaries. On August 24, it went back on air, this time as Zoom Radio. By this time, the frequency's ownership was transferred to Allied Broadcasting Center. It was officially launched last September 10.
