= DWBS-AM =

Radio station in Legazpi, Philippines

Radyo Veritas Legazpi (DWBS)
- Legazpi; Philippines
- Broadcast area: Albay and surrounding areas
- Frequency: 1008 kHz
- Branding: Veritas 1008

Programming
- Languages: Albayanon, Filipino
- Format: News, Public Affairs, Talk, Religious Radio
- Affiliations: Catholic Media Network

Ownership
- Owner: Diocesan Multi-Media Services, Inc.
- Sister stations: 94.7 Spirit FM

History
- First air date: March 1990
- Former frequencies: 1224 kHz (1990–1991)
- Call sign meaning: Boses ng Simbahan

Technical information
- Licensing authority: NTC
- Power: 5,000 watts

Links
- Website: http://veritaslegazpi.com/

DWBS (1008 AM), broadcasting as Veritas 1008, is a radio station owned and operated by Diocesan Multimedia Services, Inc., the media arm of the Diocese of Legazpi. Its studio and transmitter is located at the DMSI Hub (Old St. Jude Catholic School Compound), Sol's Subdivision Brgy. Bitano, Legazpi, Albay.
