= Allied Broadcasting Center =

Philippine radio network

- Type: Private
- Industry: Broadcast
- Founded: June 19, 1960
- Headquarters: Makati, Philippines
- Key people: Engr. Erwin V. Galang (Head, Regulatory and Industry Relations)
- Parent: Apollo Broadcast Investors

Allied Broadcasting Center is a Philippine radio network. Its corporate office is located at Unit 1703, Cityland 10, Tower 1, H.V. De la Costa St., Makati. It is a subsidiary of Apollo Broadcast Investors.

== ABC stations ==
=== AM stations ===
Branding	Callsign	Frequency	Location	Operator
Bible Radio	DZBR	531 kHz	Manila (Note: Transmitter location in Tanauan, Batangas.)	Cathedral of Praise
Life Radio	DYRP	1017 kHz	Iloilo City	JPG Broadcasting Network

=== FM stations ===
Branding	Callsign	Frequency	Location	Operator
Zoom Radio	DWRG	105.5 MHz	Naga	—N/a
Ratsada News FM	DWWV	96.7 MHz	Iriga	—N/a
Radyo Polangui	DZEV	102.7 MHz	Polangui	—N/a
Wow Smile Radio	DWAW	99.9 MHz	Sorsogon City	Wow Smile Media Services
K5 News FM Tanjay	DYPW	88.1 MHz	Tanjay	5K Broadcasting Network
South Radio News FM	DYMN	102.9 MHz	Carcar	—N/a
Radyo Ubay	DYAA	95.9 MHz	Bohol	Ubay Municipal Government
Dream Radio	DYAB	104.7 MHz	Tacloban	Prime Media Services

=== Former stations ===
Callsign	Frequency	Location	Status
DWLQ	1296 kHz	Lucena	Defunct.
DYRO	945 kHz	Roxas City	Defunct.
DYRH	1197 kHz	Bacolod	Defunct.
DYMK	93.5 MHz	Iloilo City	Currently owned by GMA Network.
DYRM	1134 kHz	Dumaguete	Acquired by the Radio Corporation of the Philippines.
DYRB	540 kHz	Cebu City	Acquired by the Radio Corporation of the Philippines.
DWPR	1296 kHz	Dagupan	Acquired by the Radio Corporation of the Philippines.
