= Masbate City =

Capital city of Masbate, Philippines

- Component city
- City of Masbate
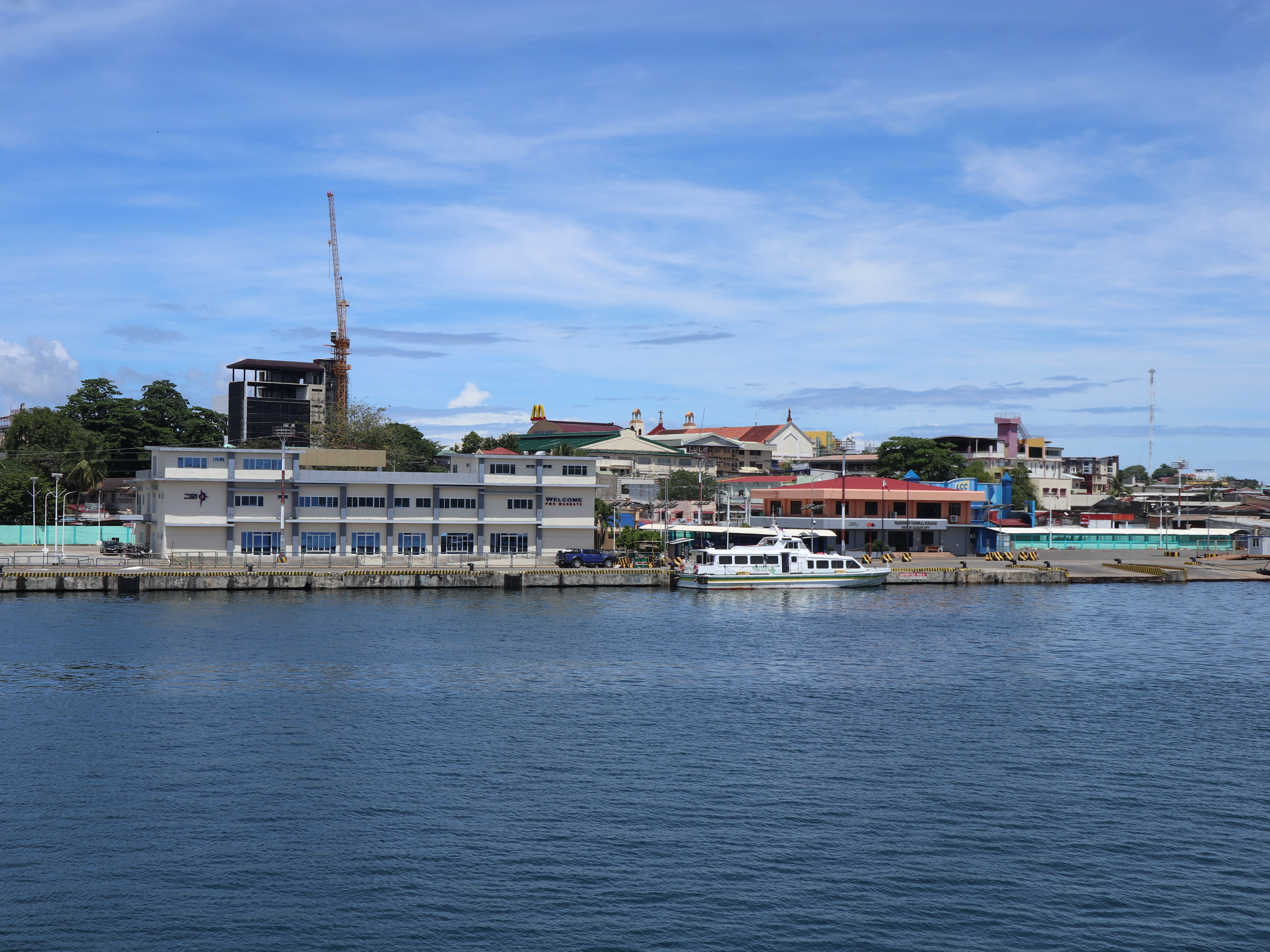
- Masbate City Port Area

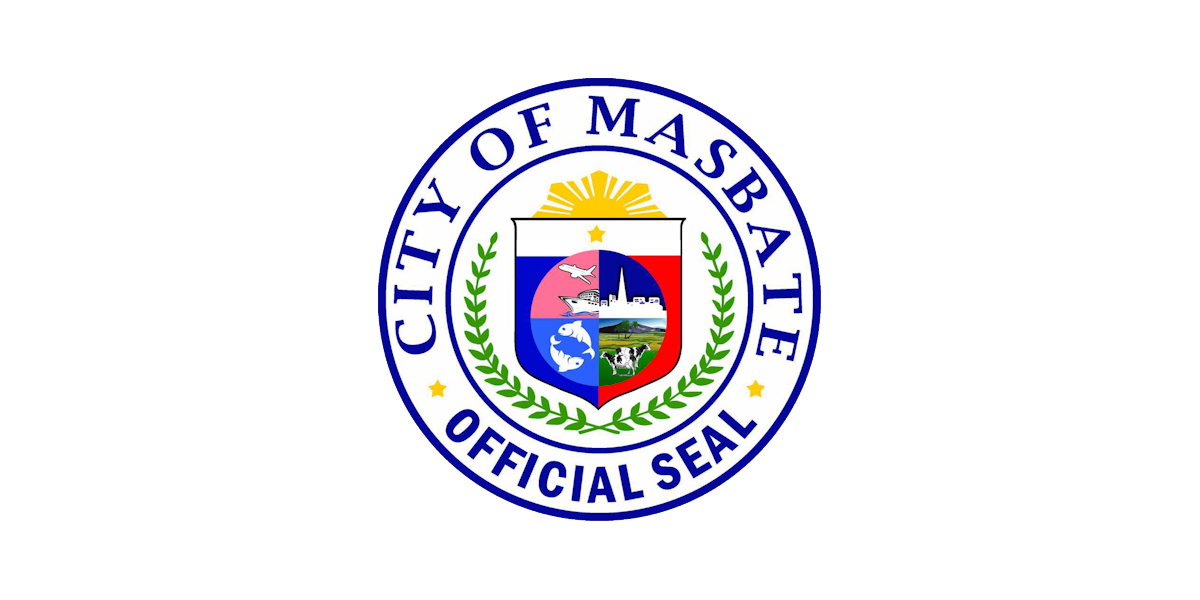
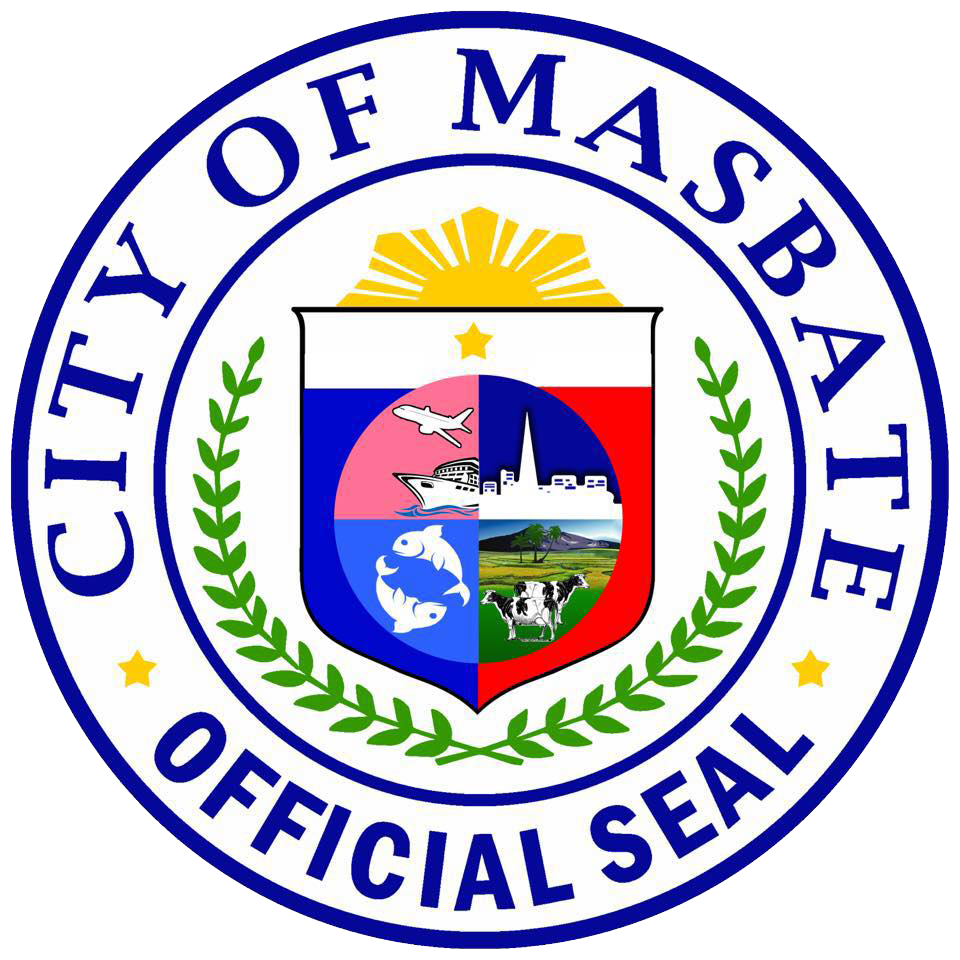
- Flag Seal
- Nicknames: Rodeo Capital of Southeast Asia; Melting Pot of Diverse Cultures and Traditions in Central Philippines
- Motto(s): Padayon na Pag-urusad, Katawhayan kag Progreso! (Continuing Unity for Peace and Prosperity!)
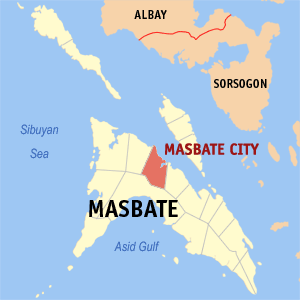
- Map of Masbate with Masbate City highlighted
- Interactive map of Masbate City
- Location within the Philippines
- Coordinates: 12°22′26″N 123°37′29″E
- Country: Philippines
- Region: Bicol Region
- Province: Masbate
- District: 2nd district
- Founded: 1864
- Cityhood: September 30, 2000
- Barangays: 30 (see Barangays)

Government
  - Type: Sangguniang Panlungsod
  - Mayor: Ara Kho
  - Vice Mayor: Alex D. San Pablo
  - Representative: Olga Kho
  - City Council: Members: Rodolfo C. Abella; Jarvey Jasper D. Bala; Rosemarie V. Salvacion; Alberto R. Abayon; Alex D. San Pablo; Joel V. Ibañez; Allan T. Lim; Meden G. Diez; Ramil O. Yaneza; Jerry A. Rey
  - Electorate: 84,898 voters (2025)

Area
  - Total: 188.00 km^{2} (72.59 sq mi)
- Elevation: 68 m (223 ft)
- Highest elevation: 697 m (2,287 ft)
- Lowest elevation: 0 m (0 ft)

Population (2024 census)
  - Total: 104,011
  - Density: 553.25/km^{2} (1,432.9/sq mi)
  - Households: 22,357
- Demonym: Masbateño

Economy
  - Income class: 3rd city income class
  - Poverty incidence: 13.42% (2023)
  - Revenue: ₱ 972.1 million (2024)
  - Assets: ₱ 2,214 million (2024)
  - Expenditure: ₱ 939 million (2024)
  - Liabilities: ₱ 657.3 million (2024)

Service provider
  - Electricity: Masbate Electric Cooperative (MASELCO)
- Time zone: UTC+8 (PST)
- ZIP code: 5400
- PSGC: 054111000
- IDD : area code: +63 (0)56
- Native languages: Masbateño; Tagalog
- Website: cityofmasbate.gov.ph

Masbate City, officially the City of Masbate (Masbateño: Syudad san Masbate; Filipino: Lungsod ng Masbate), is a 1st class component city and capital of the province of Masbate, Philippines. According to the 2024 census, it has a population of 104,011 people.

As the most populous and the only city in the province, Masbate City serves as the province's main commercial center and chief seaport.

== Etymology ==
Some accounts claim that "Masbate" was coined after the words "masa" and "bate" or from another word "masibat" remains anecdotal up to the present. Other accounts claim that the term "Masbate" comes from "masbad" which means "machete".

== History ==
=== Spanish colonial era and the Philippine Revolution ===
The islands of Masbate, Ticao and Burias were explored by Captain Luis Enriquez de Guzman in 1569. This exploration work was continued by Captain Andres de Ibarra. Ibalon (Albay) Province assumed jurisdiction over Masbate Islands, and Masbate was named the town's capital village; for security reasons, the seat of government had to be moved time and time again. It was first moved to Mobo and then again, to Guiom. It was later transferred to Palanog near the mouth of Lumbang River to make it more accessible to Bicol mainland and to the islands of Burias and Ticao. However, government records were kept inland in Cagay.

The Spaniards found several gold mines in the mountains now covered by the town of Aroroy. And in the 1850s, there were Spanish settlements in Masbate. the town of Masbate was first founded in 1864. they later founded the Pueblo de Cervantéz (later named Placer) and the Town of Milagros in 1869 and the town of Malobago (Cataingan) in 1872.

The political history of the town dates back to the 1850s when the Spaniards established their government under a Spanish gobernadorcillo. Spanish control over Masbate was lost in mid-1898 when the Pulahanes forces besieged the town before handing it to the Philippine revolutionaries that arrived in Masbate soon after.

=== Philippine-American War ===
Sometime after General Emilio Aguinaldo declared Philippine independence at Kawit, Cavite, he issued a military order to overthrow the Spanish Government in Masbate and the Visayas. General Justo Lucban and General Diego de Dios acted on this order with the help of Masbateño rebels under Pedro Kipte. Immediately thereafter, the military government under Aguinaldo's government was established. But when the American forces reached Masbate in November 1900, it took over the government of Masbate without any resistance from the Masbateños.

=== American colonial era ===
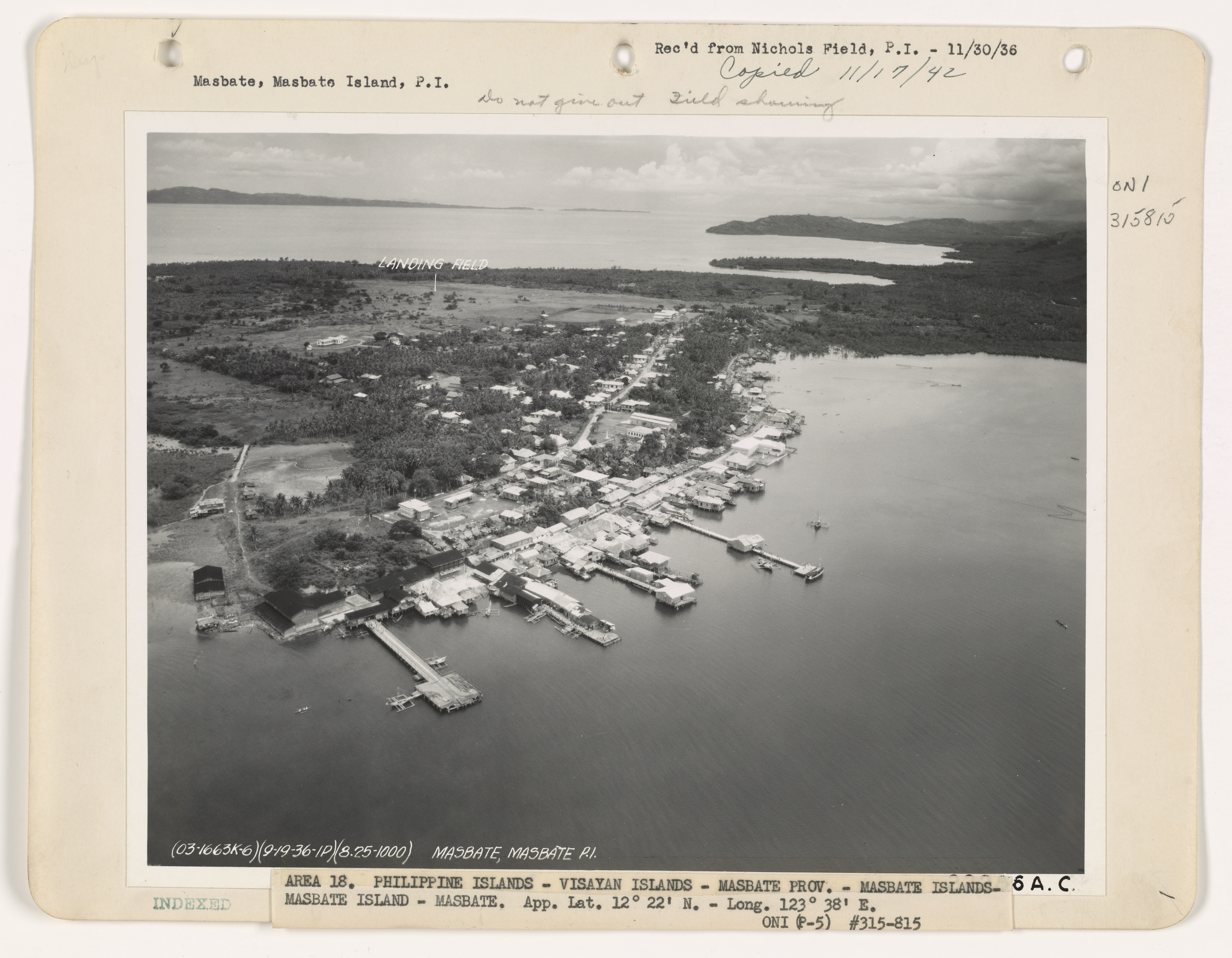
Aerial view of Masbate, 1936

After a devastating typhoon in 1908, an Executive Order was passed annexing the province of Masbate to the province of Sorsogon. Masbate, by force of circumstance, became a sub-province of Sorsogon until 1922 when its provincial status was restored. Shortly before the restoration of Philippine Independence in 1946, the town of Masbate was established as the provincial capital.

During World War II, the first elements of Japanese troops advancing from Legazpi arrived in Masbate Province at dawn on January 7, 1942, landing at several points without encountering resistance, as the stationed forces had withdrawn to Panay Island.

=== Philippine independence ===
In the mid-1990s, the idea of converting the municipality into a city was initiated by 2nd District Representative Luz Cleta Reyes Bakunawa. The effort was later continued by her successor, Congressman Emilio Espinosa Jr., in coordination with Municipal Mayor Juan P. Sanchez Sr., along with local officials and government employees.

==== Cityhood ====
On August 16, 2000, President Joseph Estrada signed Republic Act 8807 converting the Municipality of Masbate into a component city. In a plebiscite held later that year, Masbateños voted 7,800 to 3,200 in favor of cityhood, and on September 30, 2000, the Commission on Elections Regional Office in Region 5 officially proclaimed Masbate as a component city.

== Geography ==
The city is bounded on the north-east by Masbate Pass; on the south-west by the municipality of Milagros and on the north-west by a portion of Asid River and the municipalities of Milagros and Baleno.

The city is more or less situated at the center of Masbate province and Masbate Island, about 212 aerial miles and 362 nautical miles from Manila. It is noted for its well-protected seaport, with Ticao Island acting as barrier against the effects of inclement weather from the north-east. Being located at the central part of the Philippine archipelago, the city serves as Bicol Region's gateway to the Visayas and Mindanao. It is accessible through sea and air transportation.

The city's territory, with 37.6 kilometres (23.4 mi) of shoreline, includes 300 square kilometres (120 sq mi) of municipal waters, 1,240 hectares (3,100 acres) of mangroves, 560 hectares (1,400 acres) of coral reefs, and 400 hectares (990 acres) of sea grasses. Residential land use covers 229.920 hectares (568.14 acres); commercial 15.0515 hectares (37.193 acres); fish ponds 252.9759 hectares (625.117 acres); and institutional 2,813.9192 hectares (6,953.346 acres).

=== Climate ===
Dry season is from February to June and rainy from July to February.

Climate data for Masbate City (1991–2020, extremes 1908–2023)
Month	Jan	Feb	Mar	Apr	May	Jun	Jul	Aug	Sep	Oct	Nov	Dec	Year
Record high °C (°F)	35.1 (95.2)	35.4 (95.7)	36.3 (97.3)	37.5 (99.5)	37.4 (99.3)	36.8 (98.2)	36.8 (98.2)	35.8 (96.4)	36.1 (97.0)	36.0 (96.8)	36.0 (96.8)	34.5 (94.1)	37.5 (99.5)
Mean daily maximum °C (°F)	30.4 (86.7)	31.0 (87.8)	32.0 (89.6)	33.2 (91.8)	33.7 (92.7)	33.3 (91.9)	32.5 (90.5)	32.5 (90.5)	32.5 (90.5)	32.4 (90.3)	31.9 (89.4)	30.9 (87.6)	32.2 (90.0)
Daily mean °C (°F)	26.9 (80.4)	27.2 (81.0)	28.0 (82.4)	29.1 (84.4)	29.7 (85.5)	29.4 (84.9)	28.8 (83.8)	28.8 (83.8)	28.8 (83.8)	28.6 (83.5)	28.3 (82.9)	27.5 (81.5)	28.4 (83.1)
Mean daily minimum °C (°F)	23.4 (74.1)	23.4 (74.1)	24.0 (75.2)	24.9 (76.8)	25.7 (78.3)	25.5 (77.9)	25.1 (77.2)	25.1 (77.2)	25.0 (77.0)	24.9 (76.8)	24.7 (76.5)	24.1 (75.4)	24.7 (76.5)
Record low °C (°F)	19.0 (66.2)	16.1 (61.0)	19.5 (67.1)	21.1 (70.0)	21.3 (70.3)	21.3 (70.3)	21.3 (70.3)	19.8 (67.6)	20.1 (68.2)	20.0 (68.0)	20.4 (68.7)	18.2 (64.8)	16.1 (61.0)
Average rainfall mm (inches)	195.0 (7.68)	113.5 (4.47)	111.0 (4.37)	50.3 (1.98)	126.8 (4.99)	144.8 (5.70)	209.1 (8.23)	168.9 (6.65)	205.2 (8.08)	203.9 (8.03)	204.6 (8.06)	293.5 (11.56)	2,026.6 (79.79)
Average rainy days (≥ 1 mm)	14	10	8	5	8	11	15	14	15	14	15	17	146
Average relative humidity (%)	86	84	83	80	80	82	83	82	83	84	85	86	83
Source: PAGASA

=== Barangays ===
Masbate is politically subdivided into 30 barangays. Each barangay consists of puroks and some have sitios.

Here are the list of the Barangays with their corresponding population as of 2015 (outdated):

- Anas - 1,152 (Rural)
- Asid - 2,400 (Rural)
- B. Titong (formerly Bugsayon)- 1,635 (Rural)
- Bagumbayan - 4,806 (Urban)
- Bantigue - 3,272 (Rural)
- Bapor - 1,381 (Urban)
- Batuhan - 1,953 (Rural)
- Bayombon - 2,174 (Rural)
- Biyong - 2,117 (Rural)
- Bolo - 3,321 (Rural)
- Cagay - 1,769 (Rural)
- Cawayan Exterior - 1,330 (Rural)
- Cawayan Interior - 945 (Rural)
- Centro - 1,985 (Urban)
- Espinosa - 5,741 (Urban)
- F. Magallanes - 3,387 (Urban)
- Ibingay - 7,144 (Urban)
- Igang - 1,771 (Rural)
- Kalipay (now known as J.T. Fernandez) - 1,944 (Urban)
- Kinamaligan - 5,917 (Rural)
- Maingaran - 3,664 (Rural)
- Malinta - 4,153 (Rural)
- Mapiña - 1,543 (Rural)
- Nursery - 12,125 (Urban)
- Pating - 3,480 (Urban)
- Pawa - 2,253 (Rural)
- Sinalongan - 1,114 (Rural)
- Tugbo - 6,833 (Urban)
- Ubongan Dacu - 1,267 (Rural)
- Usab - 2,813 (Rural)

Anas
Anas came from the word "Dangas" which literally means bald. A native whose hair had seriously thinned out at the pâté lived in this place. "Dangas" later on became "Angas" and finally "Angas" became "Anas". Anas was established as a barangay in 1880 by the following persons: Vicente Lerit, Lorenzo Verano, Pedro Bello, Juan Cortes and Cornelio Bello. The tenientes who served the barangay in early times were Pedro Bello, Tomas Cortes, Antonio Suplito, Pedro Badillo, Timoteo Asne, Andres Verano, Epifanio Buhion, Felipe Zaragoza, Constantino Zaragoza, Casiano Lerit, Lucio Lerit, Bernabe Asne, Carmelito Cortes and Serapio Serrano. The sitios of Anas are Purang, Cabanatihan, Can-anab and Libas.
Ibingay
Barangay Ibingay was originally called Punta Ibingay the name came from the word "Bingcay" or assorted seashells, which children played with, while their mothers were busy with the entre cuatro or card playing. In 1973, it was renamed "Balo" or swordfish, the kind of fish often caught by fishermen in Ibingay waters. However, "Balo" did not stick. People continued to refer to the place as "Ibingay". So, today, Ibingay remains as its official name.
Asid
Asid, according to the legend, was formerly called "Asin". Asid River separates Masbate City from Milagros Municipality. This barangay is known for its bamboo craft. Incidentally, Asid is also the name for the gulf which is a rich fishing ground in the vicinity of Milagros town.
B. Titong
Barangay B. Titong was named after Benigno Titong Jr. who donated the barangay site of B. Titong. His father, Benigno Sr. was a German national who came to Masbate as a trader of lumber. He settled in what is now B. Titong. Formerly the place was called "Bugsayon". The barangay was established in 1890. The original families of Bugsayon were the Veranos, Tumambacs and the Titongs. The first Teniente del Barrio was Bernaldo Verano followed by Eulogio Verano, Isidro Verano, Felipe Verano and Mario Verano.
Bagumbayan
Bagumbayan was formerly called "goma". In time, the place was used by laborers as a temporary corral for cattle while the shippers were waiting for the vessel that would transport the animals to Manila. Later, the laborers called the place Bagumbayan or New Town when transients built their homes near the shore and a community was created. The name "goma" was forgotten due to disuse. Today, Bagumbayan is bursting at the seams so to speak, because of the influx of people.
Bantigue
Bantigue, a barangay across the sea facing the city poblacion is a fishing village founded by the Boholano fishermen who migrated to Masbate sometime in the 1950s. Its name was derived from the Borobantigue tree, a species of mangrove abundantly growing in the Bantigue mudflats in the olden days. Bantigue barangay is better known as the place where the native dance "Lapay Bantigue" originated.
Bapor
Barangay Bapor in earlier times was called "Puerto de San Antonio", then it was named Muelle later on, and then renamed "Eldorado", because this was the name of the Corporation which bought copra, the bodega of which was called El Dorado. In 1973, it was named bapor because of the ships that dock at Masbate wharf, which is found in the barangay. An incident tells that in 1973, when the barangay officials were deliberating and mulling on the proper name for their barangay, an incoming boat sounded its horn. Then, someone in the group said, "Why don't we call this place "Bapor" and everyone nodded in approval.
Batuhan
Barangay Batuhan came from "Kabatuhan" meaning, where rocks or boulders abound. The locality of this barangay has a large deposit of marble rocks or "kabatuhan". It is unfortunate that up to this writing, no effort has been exerted to quarry the deposit of marbles or to exploit the "guano" (bat droppings) and the edible birds nest from the caves of this barangay. Some of the noted settlers of Batuhan were Lucas Zurbito, Felipe Danao, Pedro Rosero, Venancio Natural, Ambrosio Brioso, Nicolas Danao, Francisco Malunes, Apolinario Ebona and Aproniano Torres. The sitios of Batuhan are Ed-idan, Makalangkag, Kampoon, Bukana, Ilawod, Iraya, Pacil, Kabagohan, and Ubo. The barangay was founded in 1882. With Lucas Zurbito as the first Cabeza de Barangay. The Tenientes del Barrio who were selected by the people through the years were Mariano Cervantes, Toribio Brioso, Onofre Danao, Epifanio Torres, Rufino Cebu, Jose Espinosa, and Agaton Espinosa.
Bayombon
Bayombon originated from the term Bayong and Bong. Bayong is a large buri bag, where farmers place the things they bought from Malinta during the market days. Bong is a nickname of endearment for a boy. "Daraha tabi an bayong, Bong", or please bring the bag, Bong. Later it evolved into "Bayongbong" and then "Bayombon". Another legend about the name Bayombon tells that it was named "baybay sa bobon" which refers to the sand in the well. The sitios of Bayombon are Mapugahan and Macawayan. The barangay was established in 1895 by the following families: Bacar, Torres, Guadayo, Andaya, Danao, Recto, Nerza, Francisco and Manlapaz. The Tenientes del Barrio were: Fructuoso Candidato, Eulalio Ramos, Ciriaco Bevantucios, Bibrano Manlapaz, Prudencio Nerza, Heracleo Fermin, Saturnino Tupas, Gaudencio Natural and Cresencio Bacar.

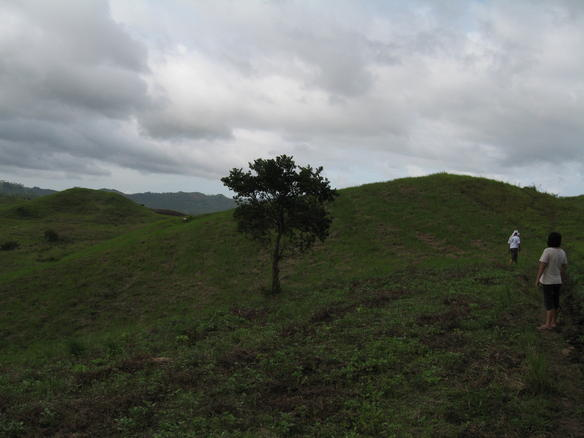
Biyong hills

Biyong
Biyong came from the native term "lambiyong", meaning whirlwind. Biyong is a level land below Igang Mountain. During bad weather, the wind tends to form into a whirlwind, which usually destroys houses and crops. In the course of time "lambiyong" shortened to "Biyong". This is a farming barangay.
Bolo
Nipa and Pagbato-on are sitios of Bolo. The barangay was established in 1926 by the following people: Daniel Fernandez, Mateo Fernandez, Julian Antonio, Timoteo Valladores, Emiliano Gutierrez, Hilario Dometita. The barangay captains were Fortunato Flores, Mateo Fernandez, Andres Buhion, Cesario Natural, Enrique Ragaza, Venancio Azuto, and Bino Gutierrez. Bolo is an Ilonggo word which means a small variety of bamboo called Bolo Bagacay, which grew abundantly in Bolo before.
Cagay
Cagay got its name from the common vine plant called "cagay". The vine was used for ropes of carabaos because it is stronger than rattan. The sitios of Cagay are Caly, Tagbon, and Burabod. The barangay was established in 1897 by Telesforo Rejuso, and the families of Dalanon, Espares, Malunes, delos Reyes, Saldivar and Robles.
Cawayan Exterior
Cawayan is a Masbateño word for bamboo. Barangay Cawayan Exterior was established in the 1900s. The sitios are: Danao, Bil-at, Lab-ogan and Pocdol. The original families of Cawayan were: Hermogenes Verano, Domingo Bajar, Pedro Cabug, Dionisio Celebre, Basilio Floresta, Pedro Cornal, Pio Cebu, Timoteo Valladores, Regacio Verano, Alberto Cabug and Florencio Fernandez Sr., the father of the governor of Masbate, Jolly T. Fernandez.
Cawayan Interior
The barangay is called Cawayan Interior because the place were bounded from coastal to upland west was situated in between Bolo, Batuhan, and Cawayan exterior. Since Cawayan upland is a sitio of Cawayan coastal (Cawayan Exterior), there happened to be an agreement of splitting into two Cawayans. This was them the idea of a certain leader Mr. Florencio Fernandez Sr. soon the official separation was made in October 1966 initiative of them Mayor Juan P. Sanchez Sr. according to sources the barangay was organized sometimes in 1971:kind hearted individuals donated the lot to be the barangay site it was Mr. Leopoldo Brioso who solicited from the late Lope Buncaras Sr. and Antonio Luzanta Sr. to donate. Folks main sources of income were farming left coastal community and settled fishing remained in the coast to fish for a decent living.

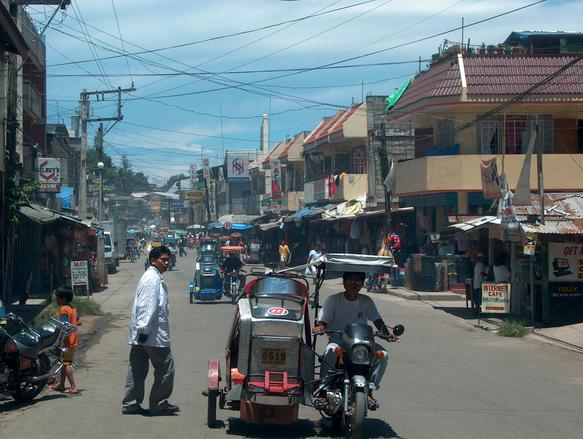
Downtown Masbate

Centro
Barangay Centro is situated at the center of the city. The first Barangay Chairman was Mr. Agapito Guadayo Sr., followed by Dr. Antonio Chang and Dr. Ricardo Lazaga. Juan Zaragoza and his family resided along Lugsadan during Spanish Era occupying his property.
Espinosa
Barangay Talahib, formerly known as Lomboy got its name sometime in 1972, when the late Tito R. Espinosa became the Municipal Mayor of Masbate Town. Talahib was the former Mayor's moniker when addressed by his close associates. Later, Talahib became Barangay Espinosa when an assassin gunned down Tito who died in Quezon City in 1995.
F. Magallanes
Barangay Magallanes was formerly called "Upa". It was a soggy swampy place but because of the Veloso Rice Mill, which deposits rice hull, the swamp was reclaimed from the sea in the course of time. Eventually, homeless settlers occupied and named the place Barangay F. Magallanes in honor of the late Francisco Magallanes the Mayor of Masbate in 1931, and the father of former Mayor of Masbate Benjamin M. Magallanes who served the town for 25 years.
Igang
Igang was named after the sharp stones that litter the area or kaigangan. The sitios of Igang are Cacia, Cabulu-an, Manticaun. Casili, Tuminobo and Buyog. The barangay was established in 1890. The original families of Igang were: Marcos, Pusing, Amaro, Andaya, Dela Peña, Gamgam, Esquillo and Arciete. The barangay tenientes were: Zoilo Amaro, Nicolas Lupango, Benito Marcos, Macario Senede, and Rencio Presado.
J. T. Fernandez
JT Fernandez is a poblacion barangay. This barangay was known as barangay Kalipay, which means happiness, since the 1973 when the City poblacion was divided into barangays. Kalipay was renamed into JT Fernandez to honor the former OIC Governor and former Assemblyman Jolly T. Fernandez through Resolution No.113-94 by motion of Esteban G. Almero on December 20, 1994.
Kinamaligan
Kinamaligan was an old name. It literally means a "camalig" or a nipa hut built in the area. Today, Kinamaligan is being urbanized. However, because of the narrow strip between the sea and the roadside, houses are overcrowded. For its expansion, it has to reclaim a generous portion of the sea nearby.
Malinta
The name "Malinta" originated from the root word "Linta" which means leech – a small (about one inch in length and ¼ inch in width) blood-sucking worm that inhabit the dark but warm forest corridor. When engorged with blood, the worm swells to about two inches in length and a half inch in width. "Malinta" literally means the place where linta/leeches are plentiful. This must have started in the later part of the 1800s when Malinta was still forested. A highland barangay, Malinta is a growing community with 500 households according to the latest Census. During saudan or tiangge (marketdays) Malinta is a center of trade for various goods such as farm products, livestock, fish and assorted commercial commodities. It is a meeting place for minor entrepreneurs and farmers. Juan Villamor was the first Teniente del Barrio of Malinta.
Mapiña
Mapiña may have gotten its name from the piña or pineapple grove planted in the area. Mapiña means the place where pineapple is plentiful.
Maingaran
Maingaran probably came about in the 1930s when Pio V. Corpuz was a congressman for Masbate. His residential house was built one hundred meters away from the road. In order to inform his visitors, the name "Don Pio V. Corpuz" was printed and placed right at the roadside. Since then, the people refer to the place "May ngaran" which literally means – the site where the name was printed. May Ngaran eventually evolved into Maingaran. The sitios of Maingaran are Calpi, Buyog, Pukdol, Bagalihog, Daan-Lungsod, and Panangdangan. The original families were: Julian Casadangan, Antonio Malunes, Lorenzo Malunes, Jorge Malunes, Lutz Radaza, Leoncio Cabatingan, Isidro Villaraiz, Macario Cristobal, Juan Dioquino, Antonio Fernandez, and Gregorio Sampaga.
Nursery
Barangay Nursery, was the original name of the place. Sometime in the 1950s, the area was occupied by the Masbate Provincial Nursery under Mr. Romeo Escuadra, Provincial Agriculturist. In the course of time, at the periphery of Nursery, the population grew. In 1973, the place was renamed "Acacia", but like "Balo" the name was not popular. The residents continued to call their place Nursery. So Nursery remains as the official name of the barangay.
Pating
Barangay Pating, formerly called "Ubos" elected Natividad Cervantes whose alias was "Pating", the first barangay chairman of the said barangay.
Pawa
Pawa is a Masbateño term for clearing. In the olden days, the place was heavily forested with mangrove trees. The residents decided to cut the trees and created a clearing. They built a cluster of houses and then in the course of time, Pawa community was formed. Boat building and fishing are the major industries of Pawa barangay.
Tugbo
Tugbo Barangay is situated some four kilometers south of Masbate City proper. The legend of the place tells that its name originated from "tigbe" a kind of wild plant which thrived abundantly in olden days. Tugbo is a fishing community, no wonder then that the Badjaos who came in droves some two years ago had chosen the shoreline of Tugbo as their dwelling place.
Ubongan Dacu
Ubongan, on the other hand was named after the portion of the river where residents wade especially during the rainy season when the river swells. Originally, it was "ubogan", meaning, where one wades, from the root word "ubog" or wade.
Usab
Usab originated from the Cebuano word "usab" which literally means "again". When the Combined American-Filipino Liberation Army came in 1945, it is said that a Cebuano farmer had crossed the street and was almost run over by a large army truck. Later, he told the people that he will not cross the street again if there is a vehicle around by saying "Dili na ako mo-usab paglakaw sa kalsada ug na-ay sakyahan nga mo-agi". The people named the place where the incident happened, "Usab". The barangay is a farming community.

== Demographics ==
City Hall of Masbate

Population census of Masbate City

Year	Pop.	±% p.a.
1903	5,235	—
1918	10,821	+4.96%
1939	23,312	+3.72%
1948	24,999	+0.78%
1960	31,613	+1.98%
1970	45,591	+3.72%
1975	46,728	+0.50%
1980	52,944	+2.53%

Year	Pop.	±% p.a.
1990	58,714	+1.04%
1995	66,049	+2.23%
2000	71,441	+1.70%
2007	81,585	+1.85%
2010	85,227	+1.60%
2015	95,389	+2.17%
2020	104,522	+1.94%
2024	104,011	−0.12%

Source: Philippine Statistics Authority

In the 2024 census, the population of Masbate City was 104,011 people, with a density of 550 inhabitants per square kilometre or 1,400 inhabitants per square mile.

=== Language ===
The city's majority language is Masbateño, with Hiligaynon, Waray, Cebuano and Bicolano following next.

=== Religion ===
The city is the ecclesiastical seat of the Roman Catholic Diocese of Masbate with the Cathedral of Saint Anthony of Padua (Masbate Cathedral) as its church. Like most Filipinos, the vast majority of the city's residents are Roman Catholics.

== Economy ==
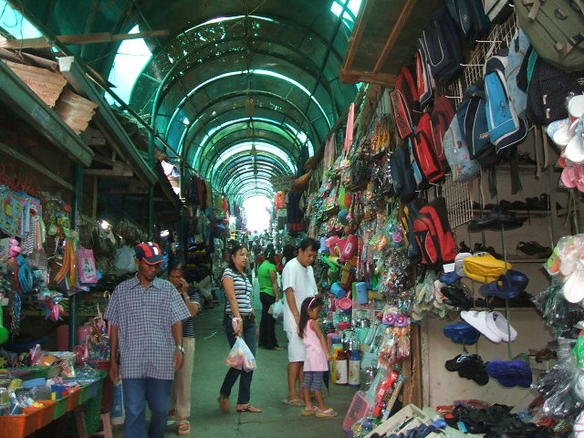
Lugsadan Commercial Center, Masbate City

Poverty incidence of Masbate City (%)

Source: Philippine Statistics Authority

Masbate City was recognized by the Philippine Chamber of Commerce and Industry as Top 4 Awardee Nationwide in the 2013 Most Business-Friendly LGU Award (City Level 3 Category). The city is also cited as the 20th Most Competitive City among 143 cities in the Philippines. The city is the center of trading activities in the province. It serves as the intra-distributor of almost all commodities being traded to other municipalities in the entire province.

=== Industry ===
Masbate's main products are copra and marine resources such as fish. These are traded to Manila, Lucena, Legazpi, and Cebu cities. Other traded products such as dried fish, crabs, prawn, bangus, livestock, and rice are coming from the neighboring or nearby municipalities on the island.

==== Trading relations ====
The city has existing trading relations with Manila, Iligan, Lucena, Daet, Legazpi, Naga, Sorsogon, Panay, Negros, Cebu, Bohol, Ormoc, Calbayog and Tacloban. These are the main destinations of the products traded by the city and those of the other municipalities passing through the city's port. Copra, cattle and aquamarine products are also shipped-out to Manila, Cebu, Batangas and Lucena, etc. Shrimps, crabs and prawns are shipped to Japan, mud crabs to Taiwan, headless squid to United States of America and Japan, crab meat to U.S.A. and scallops to Europe.

The city is importing products mainly from Manila, Lucena, Cebu and Legazpi. These are mostly rice, bakery raw materials, transport vehicles and appliances, farm inputs, construction materials and basic commodities. These are also traded by the city to other municipalities in the whole province.

=== Banking and finance ===
Masbate City is the Financial Center of Masbate Province. The total number of Banks in the city is 15, consisting of different Government-owned Banks, Universal Bank, Commercial Banks, Rural Banks, Development Banks and Thrift Banks. Banco de Oro or BDO which is the country's largest bank in terms of assets open its first branch in the entire province in the city.

=== Shopping malls ===
LCC Mall and Gaisano Capital Masbate are the only two shopping malls in the city. LCC Masbate is located at Barangay Bapor, Zurbito St. Port Area, while Gaisano Capital Masbate is located in Cagba St.

== Tourism ==
=== Festivals and events ===
Pagdayao Festival
This festival honors, praises and give thanks to the city's Patron Saint Anthony of Padua every June 13 of the year.

Lapay Bantigue Dance Festival
It is celebrated during the City Anniversary on 30th day of September. This event highlights the traditional folk dance created by "Lola Felisa" many years ago, when she imitated the graceful movement of the seagull (locally known as Lapay). The dance has evolved and is now recognized by the Cultural Center of the Philippines as one of the official folk dances of the country. This dance was also recognized during the Spanish Colonization.

Rodeo Masbateño
It is the only rodeo show in Asia. It is celebrated annually in April and showcase 10 competitive rodeo events. Highlighting this event is the difficult "figure of eight" competition where the cowboy crisscrosses around a group of barrels. Women participate in heart stopping events like calf wrestling, calf lassoing and carambola.

=== Places of interest ===
Masbate Cathedral

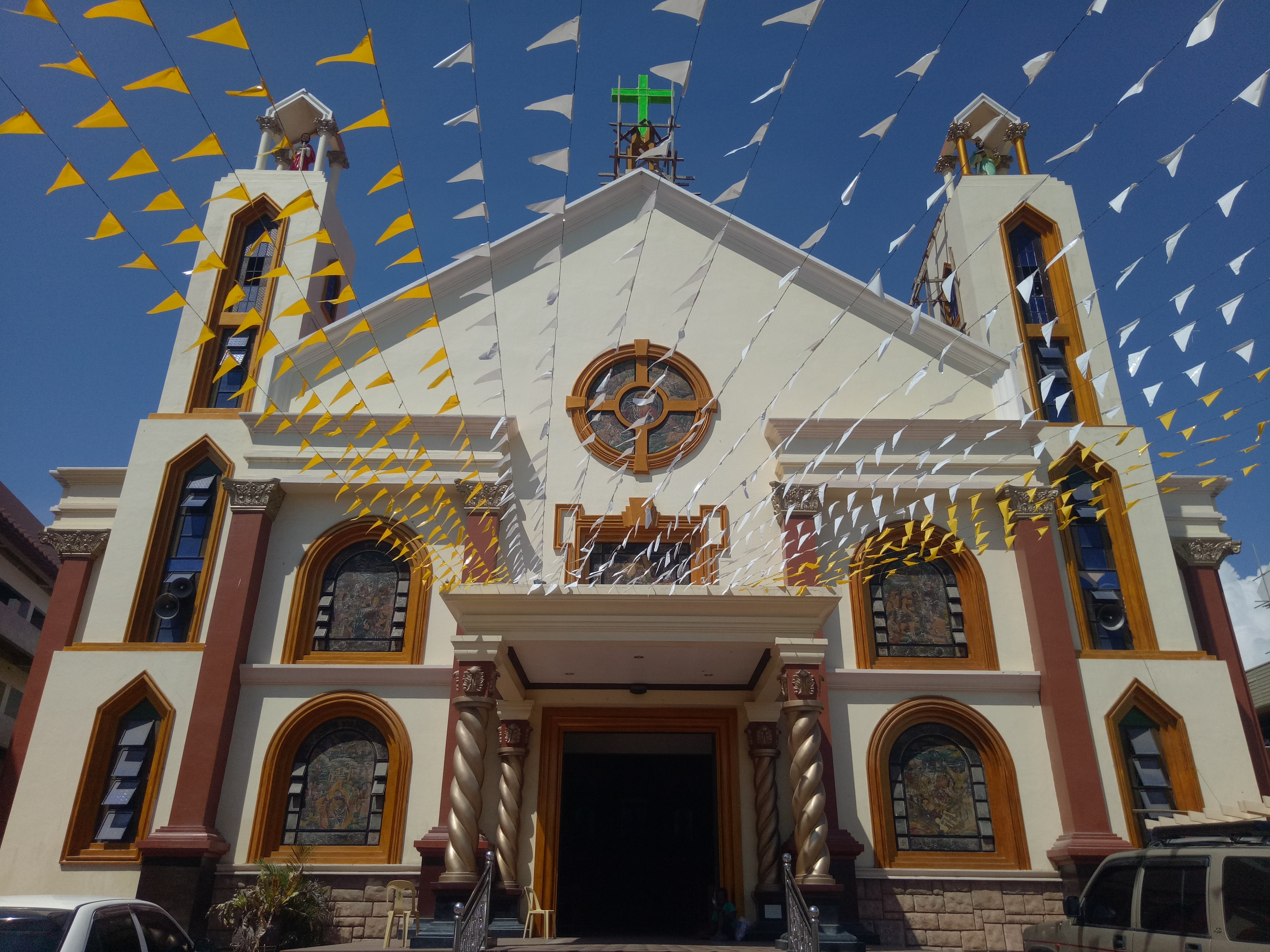
Masbate Cathedral

formally known as the Cathedral-Parish of Saint Anthony of Padua, is a Roman Catholic church located at Quezon Street, Masbate City. It is the cathedral or seat of the Roman Catholic Diocese of Masbate. It belongs to the Vicariate of St. Anthony of Padua, which includes also Sacred Heart of Jesus Parish in Malinta, Masbate City and St. Nicholas of Tolentino Parish in Mobo. It was founded in 1578 by Spanish Missionaries.

Coastal Resource Management Interpretative Center (CRMIC)
Being the first of its kind in the Philippines is a great staging point from which you can plan and begin your journey of discovery and exploration of the diverse and amazing natural and cultural wonders of Masbate.

Magallanes Coliseum

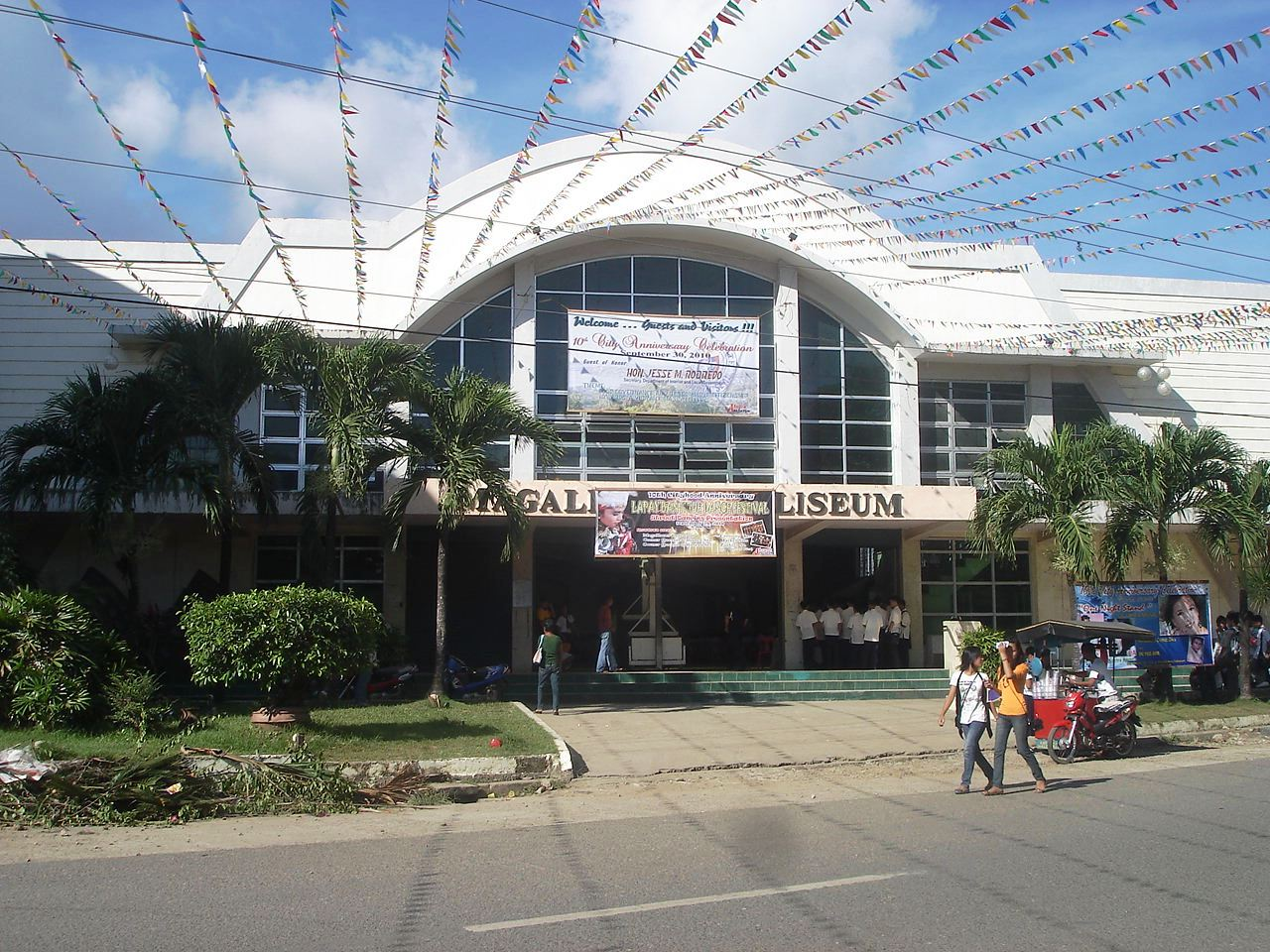
Magallanes Coliseum

The Magallanes Coliseum is a 1230 square meter amenity constructed in 2004 as a venue for sports, recreation, and other major city celebrations.

==== Natural attractions ====
Pawa Mangrove Nature Park
The city's biggest area of natural mangrove growth, with 300 hectares of mangrove plantation along its 1.3 kilometer boardwalk.

Buntod Sand Bar and Marine Sanctuary

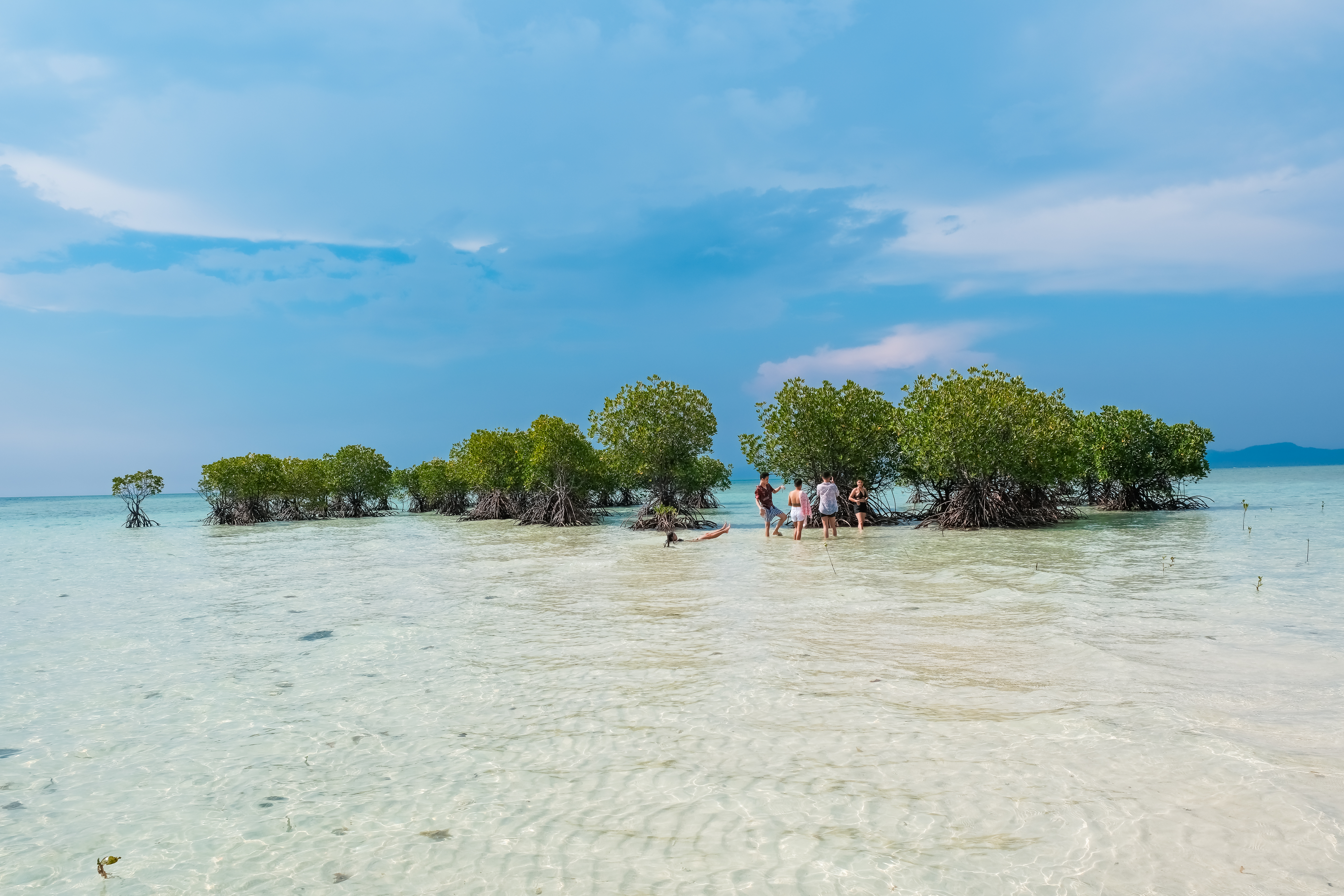
Buntod Sand Bar

The first established marine sanctuary of the city where live hard and soft coral covers highlights the majestic underwater sceneries.

Bugsayon Marine Sanctuary
A 50-hectare marine sanctuary where you can experience to see the amazing live corals and its diverse marine animals.

Tattoo Island
Also called as Minalayo Island. It has a number of openings of various sizes that lead to an underground lagoon where sea snakes and bats reign.

== Transportation ==
=== By air ===
The city is accessible by air via the Moises R. Espinosa Airport that is located within the city proper. Cebu Pacific (operated by Cebgo) has morning flights to and from Manila.

=== By land ===
Masbate can be reached from Manila by land through South Road to the Port of Pio Duran, Albay, Pilar, Sorsogon, and Bulan, Sorsogon. From there, RORO ferry and fastcraft take about two hours and fifteen minutes or motorized boat for a three-hour ride to the Port of Masbate.

=== By sea ===
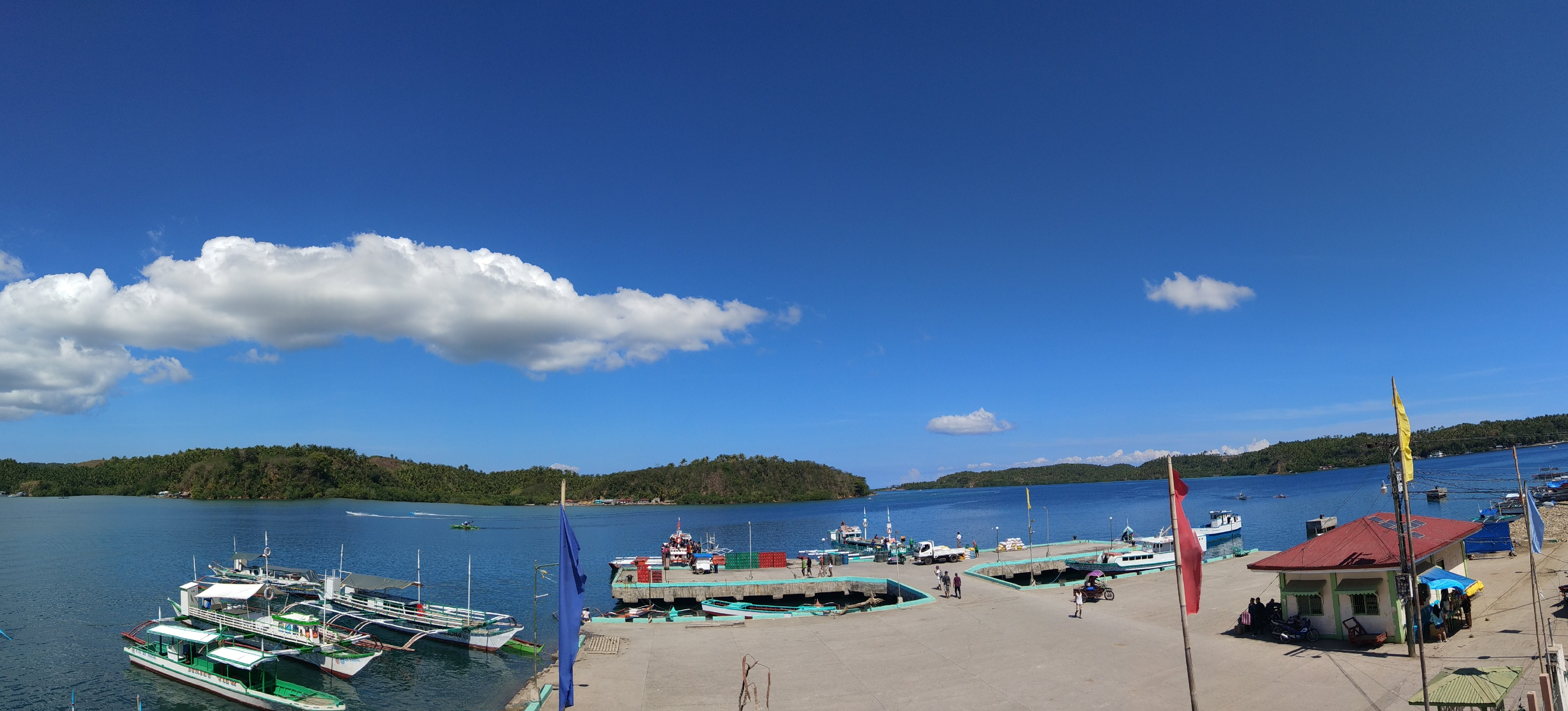
Masbate Port

Masbate can also be reached through the sea on board in a luxury shipping lines from the Port of Manila, taking about 16 to 18 hours. Other sea trips are via Dalahican Port in Lucena, Pio Duran Port in Pio Duran, Albay and to Allen, Northern Samar.

To the neighboring islands, Masbate City is three hours away by boat from the nearest point in Bicol mainland; three hours away from the nearest point in Burias; three hours away from the nearest municipality in Ticao Island; five hours from the nearest point in the island of Cebu and five hours from the nearest point in Panay island.

== Notable people ==
=== Politics ===
- Emilio Espinosa Jr., politician, former governor and served as Secretary of the Department of Labor under President Ferdinand Marcos.
- Leonardo Quisumbing, lawyer, politician, served as former secretary of the Department of Labor and Employment and associate justice of the Supreme Court.
- Jesse Robredo, politician, former secretary of the Department of Interior and Local Government who died in a plane crash at Masbate islands nearby.

=== Television and other personalities ===
- Bea Rose Santiago, beauty queen and television personality, Miss International 2013
- Kisses Delavin, actress and singer
- Hannah Arnold, beauty queen, model, and television personality, Binibining Pilipinas International 2021

== Sister cities ==
=== Local ===
- (Philippines) Legazpi City, Albay
- (Philippines) Daet, Camarines Norte
- (Philippines) Kalibo

== See also ==
- Masbateño people
- Masbateño language
