= Our Lady of Salvation =

Title of Mary, mother of Jesus

Our Lady of Salvation Nuestra Señora de Salvación de Joroan
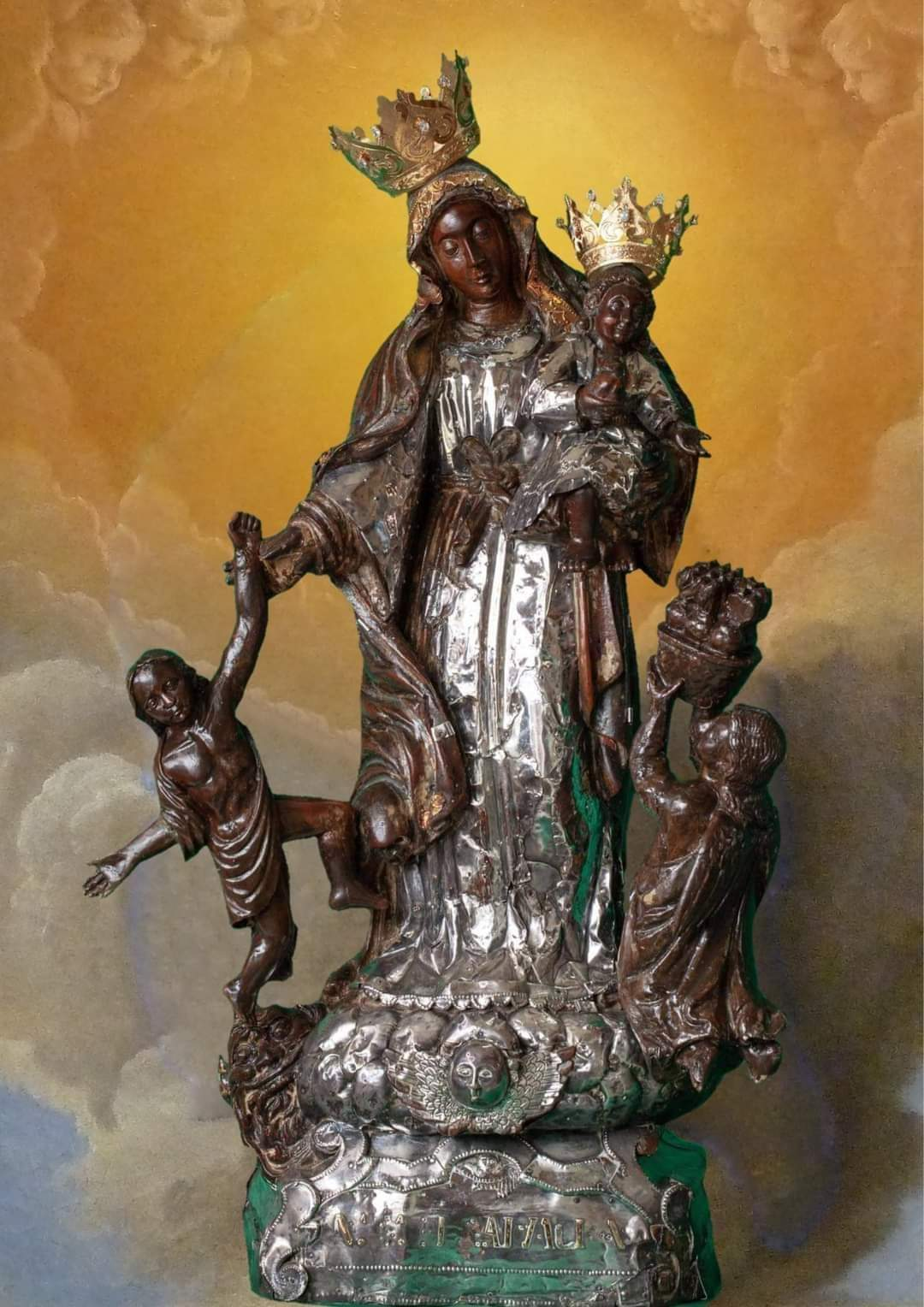
- The original image of Our Lady of Salvation venerated in Joroan, Tiwi, Albay, Philippines
- Location: Joroan, Tiwi, Albay; Philippines
- Date: 1775
- Witness: Various
- Type: Marian apparition
- Approval: Pope Paul VI (patronage, 1977) Pope Leo XIV (canonical coronation, 2026)
- Shrine: Diocesan Shrine and Parish of Our Lady of Salvation, Joroan
- Patronage: Diocese of Legazpi; Bicol Region (particularly Albay); Canlapwas, Catbalogan; Pasadena, San Juan, Metro Manila; Lawigan, San Joaquin, Iloilo
- Attributes: Soul being saved from Hellmouth, Child Jesus with a flaming heart, angel offering a basket of hearts

Our Lady of Salvation (Spanish: Nuestra Señora de Salvación), also known as Our Lady of Light, is a Catholic title of the Blessed Virgin Mary. The devotion to Our Lady of Salvation is based on a wooden statue of the Virgin Mary that was first venerated in Joroan (now part of Tiwi, Albay) in the Philippines.

The image was episcopally crowned 25 August 1976 by Cardinal Jaime Sin, Archbishop of Manila. The former Bishop of Legazpi, Teotimo Pacis y Cruel declared the Virgin Mary under this title as the patroness of Albay province.

Pope Leo XIV granted the image a decree of Pontifical coronation. The decree was issued on October 20, 2026.

She was crowned on October 28, 2026 by Cardinal Luis Antonio Gokim Tagle, Dean of the College of the Cardinals

== Description ==
The original, 18th-century image of Our Lady of Salvation reflects her role as Co-Redemptrix, the 15th-century name for the Catholic belief in her cooperation in the salvation of the world through Jesus Christ. The Virgin is portrayed as carrying the Christ Child in her left arm, while her right arm grasps a man (Note: The man portrayed in the original image as being saved from the devil is usually misinterpreted as a child.) by the wrist as he is about to fall into a gaping Hellmouth. An angel kneels by the left foot of the Virgin, offering a basket of burning hearts to the Christ Child, who holds a burning heart in his right hand. His left hand is stretched in a gesture of accepting the hearts.

== History ==
Much of the history regarding the statue of the Lady of Salvation and the Marian devotion centered on it rely heavily on the written accounts, based on tradition, of the first parish priest of Joroan, Rev Lamberto S. Fulay (1919–1935), in his booklet An Kasaysayan Kan Ladawan Ni Birhen de Salvación (“The History of the Image of the Virgin of Salvation”).

=== The Calpi tree ===
According to the Fulay account, in the 1770s a certain haciendero named Don Silverio Arcilla of Buhi, assigned a tenant farmer called Mariano Dacoba, to one of his vast estates in Joroan (once known as Cagnipa), then a satellite barrio of Buhi. While Dacoba was clearing parts of Arcilla's hacienda one day, he cut down a large kalpi (Citrus webberii) tree. Although already severed at the base, the tree's leaves did not wilt and maintained its life and freshness. The tenant informed Arcilla, and the latter consulted with the curate of Buhi. (Note: Joroan was under the jurisdiction of Buhi during the Spanish colonial period)

A certain sculptor called Bagacumba was commissioned by the curate of Buhi to carve an image from the wood of the felled but living Calpi. The resulting images were: the statue of Our Lady of Salvation, a relief of Our Lady of Solitude, and that of Saint Anthony of Padua. (Note: The statues of Our Lady of Salvation, Our Lady of Solitude, and St. Anthony of Padua were given to the barrios of Joroan, Buhi, and Tambo respectively) On 25 August 1776, the image of Our Lady of Salvation was lent to Joroan on condition that the villagers build a chapel at the centre of their barrio. Consequently, a certain Sotera Cababag was assigned as the chapel's Hermana Mayora, in charge of caring for the image.

=== The 1853 agreement ===
Buhi was initially the image's rightful owner as it was the residence of Silverio Arcilla (who owned the land where the statue's wood came from), the curate who had commissioned the image, and the sculptor Bagacumba. On 21 January 1853, Buhi and Joroan had an agreement transferring rights over the image to the latter. Buhi's parish priest and its gobernadorcillo, Rev Antonio Guadalajara and Mariano Buenaflor, respectively, made the pact with Joroan's barrio lieutenants. In accordance with the agreement, Buhi surrendered all rights over the image to the people of Joroan for an offering of fifty pesos fuertes, and an additional twenty-five for a bell.

=== Miracles ===
==== First miracle ====
Joroan, according to Fulay, was often the target of Muslim marauders due to being on the coast of Lagonoy Gulf. During one attack, the people of Joroan would flock to the image and pray to the Virgin for protection. Tradition notes that Muslims pillaging Joroan would constantly fail to ignite houses, and this was attributed to the protection of the Virgin. (Note: According to Fulay, the exact period of the phenomenon of the torch is unknown, although he suggests that it was sometime during the reign of Manuel Grivaljo as Bishop of the See of Nueva Cáceres (1748-1761))

==== Deliverance of Hermana Tiray ====
The second miracle was when a Hermana Mayora known only as "Tiray" was captured in a Moro raid. After a year of captivity in Sulu, Tiray fell into a deep sleep and upon waking, realised she was no longer in her quarters but standing in an unknown forest. She then saw a strange, white deer in the woods, and out of curiosity followed it through the mountains until losing sight of the creature. Tiray soon discovered she had been miraculously transported to Legazpi, and was now only 38 km south of Joroan. After this incident, the people of Joroan moved the chapel further away from the sea to a higher location in the mountains, in order to avoid its desecration by raiders.

==== Apparition ====
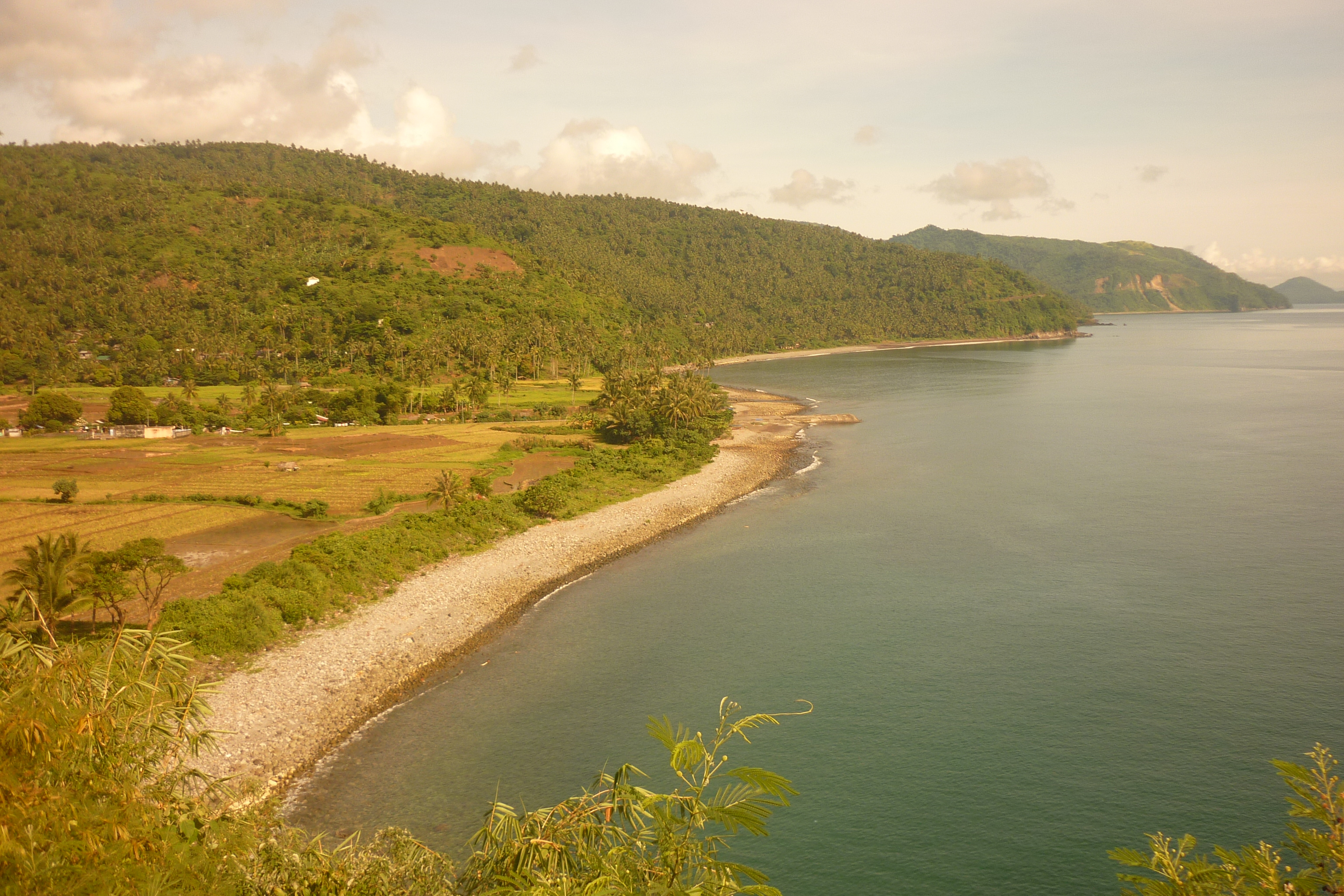
The Beaches of Joroan, where Muslim raiders mounted their attacks, was also where folklore situates the apparition of Our Lady of Salvation.

The third miracle was an apparition of Our Lady of Salvation. Four devotees from the island of Catanduanes sailed west to Joroan for a pilgrimage, bringing with them a set of beeswax candles they intended to offer at the shrine. Upon reaching land, three of them made a detour to Buhi to light candles for Saint Anthony of Padua in Tambo, while the fourth pilgrim was left to guard their boat. As the fourth man strolled along the beach at dusk, he met a woman carrying her child. She asked him for a candle to light the way to her home in the mountains, as it was almost dark. The man refused as the candle was not his, but the insistent woman promised she would return the candle the next morning if he would come to her upland house. Out of generosity, the man acquiesced to the lady, who told him he can the next day enquire where she lived from the town lieutenant of Joroan, so that she might return his candle.

The next day, the man did as he was told, but the town lieutenant did not know where the mysterious lady lived. The lieutenant referred the pilgrim to the Hermana Mayora, who was also of no help, save for advising the man to seek divine guidance at the shrine of Our Lady of Salvation. Upon arriving at the chapel, the shocked man found at the foot of the image the exact same but unused candle he had lent the mysterious lady at the beach the day before. He looked at the image of the Virgin Mary and it resembled the mysterious lady, and so he was filled with compunction. After leaving the candle with her, he prostrated and asked the Virgin to pray for the forgiveness of his sins.

==== Final Muslim raid ====
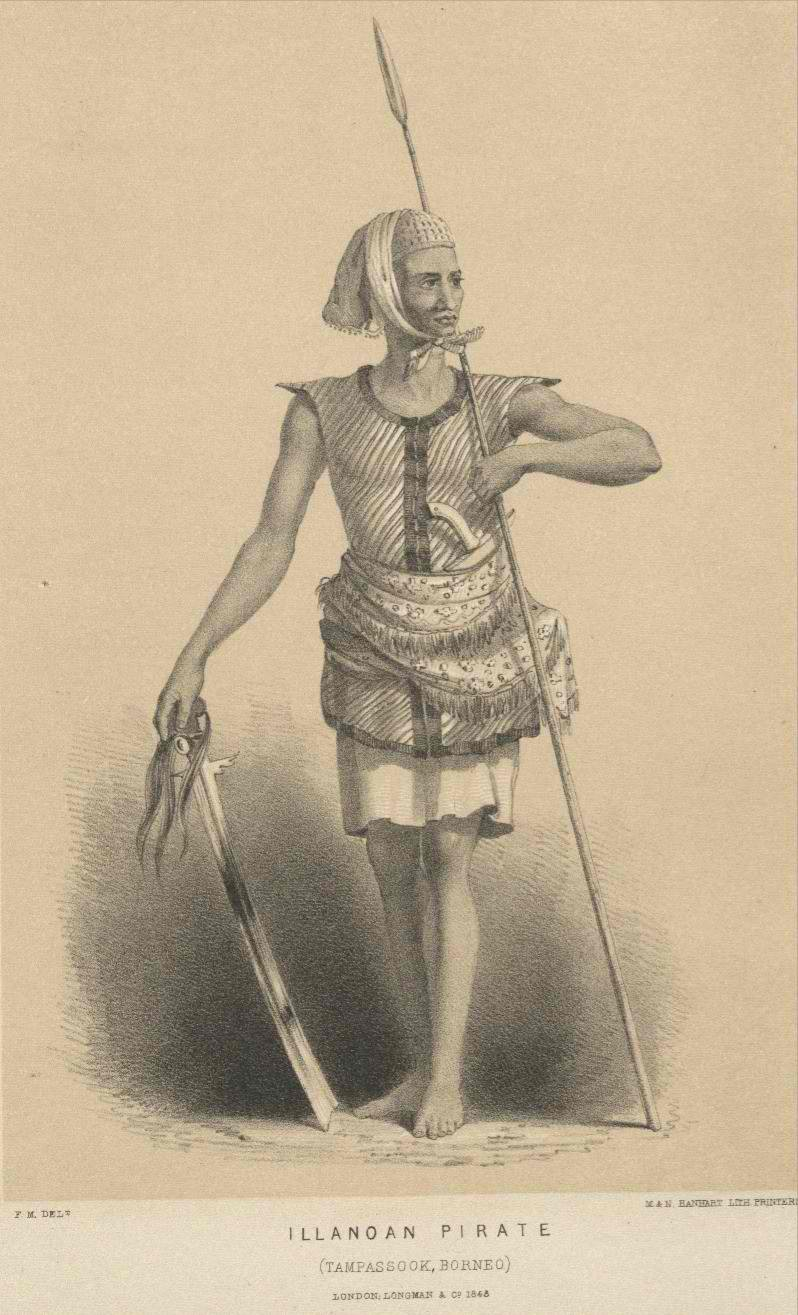
A 19th-century illustration of an Iranun pirate.

The fourth miracle attributed to Our Lady of Salvation occurred during the years that a Dominga de los Reyes succeeded Tiray as Hermana Mayora. While on one of their raids, the Moro pirates were said to have retreated almost immediately after seeing a vision of heavily armed men. The vision was said to have traumatised the raiders so much that it was the last Muslim attack on the shores of Joroan. (Note: It can be said that the vision was just a means of scaring the Muslim raiders; no actual army was ever recorded to have been on that occasion, hence an illusion)

==== The Boat ====
On the eve of the feast of Our Lady of Salvation in 1884, a group from the Partido were sailing to Joroan when a whirlwind attacked the boat. Giant waves almost drowned them, but the passengers’ boat suddenly regained its balance, and their clothes were completely dry as though freshly ironed. The group attributed their escape from death to Our Lady of Salvation.

=== Boundary dispute ===
In the late 19th century, a territorial dispute arose over whether Joroan was governed from Buhi in Ambos Camarines, or Tiwi in Albay. A certain Captain Vera from Albay argued that Tiwi's relative proximity to Joroan gave it rightful jurisdiction. Vera won the case, and Joroan was annexed by Tiwi as a barangay, becoming a part of Albay.

=== Construction of a new church ===
Joroan became very peaceful in the 1860s, as the boundary dispute was resolved, and the Muslims no longer attacked the barrio. During this time, Doña Clara de Vera, the wife of a certain landlord named Don Vicente de Vera, (Note: Don Vicente de Vera was known in Joroan as a wealthy landlord) became the image's Hermana Mayora. Doña Clara vowed to care for the image until her death, and financed its silver and gold plating.

Unsatisfied with her lifetime of service, Clara de Vers began building a new church at the centre of Joroan. In her eagerness to construct, she sought the help of her friend, Doña Saturnina de Bayot of Tabaco, to finance the project. Another acquaintance, Don Manuel Casa of Manila, also contributed greatly, sending the needed materials and an architect. During the long trip to Joroan, the architect whom Casa had dispatched fell seriously ill, and men had to support him as he supervised construction. After a great deal of pain, the architect was suddenly cured on the ninth day of his work.

=== Disputes with Tiwi ===
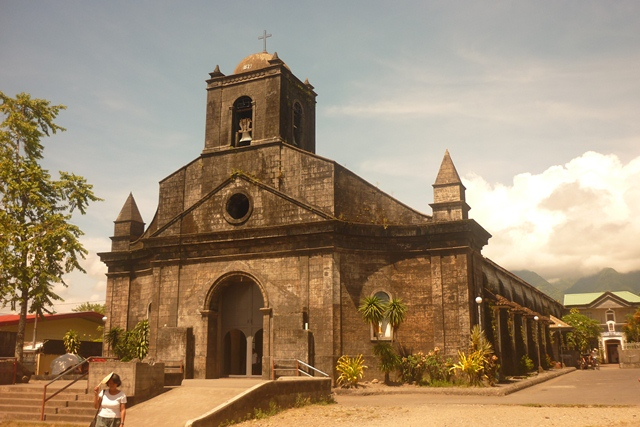
Saint Lawrence the Martyr Parish in Tiwi, where the image was enshrined from 1895 to 1919.

==== Traslación ====
After the church was finished, the image was translated from its mountain chapel to the new shrine, beginning the annual custom of the image's traslación to Tiwi.

The people of Tiwi had also become ardent devotees of Our Lady of Salvation, and tradition holds that before the fiesta, the parish priest of Tiwi would personally retrieve the image from Joroan. (Note: Traslación can be generally defined as a Spanish term for an action and effect of moving from place to someone or something) The arrival of the image in Tiwi was a moment of great rejoicing, and a band would accompany its entry into the town. (Note: Transportation from Joroan to Tiwi was either by land or by sea. However, a 9km land travel was very difficult during that time due to the lack of proper roads leading to Joroan, so travel by sea was more convenient)

The practice was cut short by a typhoon that devastated Joroan in 1895. The chapel was completely destroyed, but the image was found miraculously standing on its pedestal. The people of Joroan rebuilt half of the chapel from the debris, but everything later deteriorated. A long and bitter rift between Joroan and Tiwi began: since the former was governed by the latter, Rev Francisco Borondia kept the image in Tiwi until a proper chapel was built in Joroan.

This meant that the direction of the traslación was reversed, as the people of Joroan would borrow the image during fiestas— an arrangement they greatly resented. They almost lost their right to enshrining the image, which they had spent a lot of time, effort, and money to recover, and thus inevitably earning the ire of the people of Tiwi.

==== Disputes with Ricardo Sayson ====
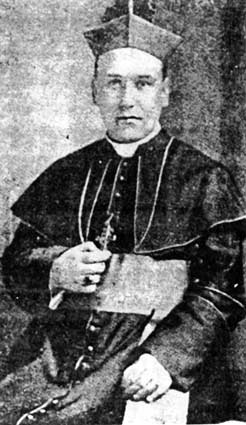
Most Rev. John Bernard McGinley, Bishop of Cáceres and arbiter of the dispute between Tiwi and Joroan over the image.

In 1917, Joroan planned to hold a grand celebration from the beginning of the novena honouring the image up to a few days after the fiesta. On the ninth day, the people of Joroan requested of Rev Ricardo Sayson, the Tiwi parish priest, that the image be allowed to stay a little longer in Joroan so that might make further homage to the Virgin. Sayson refused, and arrogantly taunted the people, daring them to file a complaint at court.

The people of Joroan drafted a letter to Most Rev John Bernard McGinley, Bishop of Cáceres, requesting designation of a separate curate for Joroan. Pedro Colar I and Lino Clutario were tasked to deliver the request, and immediately set out for the episcopal see in Naga, but turned back on learning McGinley was visiting Albay. The emissaries overtook McGinley in Iriga, but the bishop refused to discuss the matter there, suggesting they instead meet on it in Malinao on 17 November 1917. On the appointed date, Joroan again sent Clutario, this time with Miguel Diolata, and the brothers Felipe and Lorenzo Clutario. (Note: Felipe and Lorenzo Clutario are brothers.)

Lino Clutario was the group's spokesman, as he had the best command of English. During their audience, Clutario told Bishop McGinley that Joroan wanted a separate curate for their barrio, and that the image of Our Lady of Salvation be ordered returned to them. The McGinley declined the first request due to a lack of priests in the diocese, but considered the second with an order to verify the origins of the image. Another audience was set for two days later, this time with Tiwi as the venue, but nothing favourable for the people of Joroan resulted from the conference. The issue was brought to court, with Narciso Cultivo spearheading the case of the real owner of the image, and Domingo Imperial as lawyer. The civil court however deemed it an ecclesiastical matter and soon dropped it, endorsing the case to McGinley.

==== Creation of Joroan Parish ====
In 1918, Rev. Tomás Bernales succeeded Sayson as curate of Tiwi, and Bishop McGinley authorised him to settle the dispute with Joroan. In May of that year, Councilor Alfajara and Lieutenant Cultivo of Joroan met with Bernales, and both sides agreed that Joroan was to become a separate parish covering barangays of Sogod, Matalibong, Bariis, Maynonong, Misibis, Dapdap, and Mayong under Tiwi. Bishop McGinley was informed of the agreement, and named Rev. Lamberto S. Fulay as its first parish priest. The Parish of Joroan was canonically erected on 18 September 1919, with Fulay assuming duties as curate on 8 October.

The image of Our Lady of Salvation was still in Tiwi, so in accordance with the 1918 agreement, another Traslación was scheduled for 20 November 1919. Joroan Church had no proper paraphernalia for the time being, so Bernales lent some of his things, while donations began to pour in from all over Albay to the new parish.

The images was greeted with fireworks as its boat docked at Joroan, and there great jubilation among the townsfolk. Early the next morning, a solemn High Mass was celebrated with a huge number of pilgrims from all over the Bicolandia in attendance. Also present were the Vicar Forane; the pastors of Tiwi, Tabaco, and Nabua; the Governor of Albay; the board members of the Provincial Government; the Municipal President; the Municipal Council; and other prominent people.

==== Episcopal Decree of 1919 ====
Among the terms of agreement made when Joroan was raised to the status of parish was the episcopal decree Constandoonos of 18 September 1919. The Decree states that:

Menos qué por el espacio de quince días continuos cada año pueda estar (la imagen) en la iglesia de Tiwi, bajo instrucción del Párroco de Tiwi, para el debido culto de los fieles. Y se ordena que la trasferencia y conducción anual a Tiwi sean hechos con todo decoro y solemnidad convenientes. (“Except for the space of fifteen days consecutive every year, [the image] can stay in the church of Tiwi, under instruction of the parish priest of Tiwi, for the due cult of the faithful. And it is ordained that the annual transfer and conduction to Tiwi be done with all suitable decorum and solemnity.”)

Although already a parish by now, Joroan still had several issues. The Decree was no guarantee that the image was now fully in Joroan's possession, so a committee was organised with the purpose of appealing to Bishop McGinley for the Decree's revision and deletion of the clause “except for the space of fifteen days”. McGinley rejected the request by further stating that the Decree is part of the terms of agreement for the elevation of Joroan to the status of a parish, and that its representatives signed it.

==== Rising tensions ====
In 1920, Joroan was reminded to comply with the Decree. The people however, were still adamant for fear that something unfavourable might happen and majority of the people, especially the women, no longer favoured the idea of lending the image of Our Lady of Salvation to Tiwi. This prompted Bishop McGinley to dispatch Fr. Luis Dimaruba, a priest vested with ecclesiastical authority, to warn the people Joroan of their insolence, and persuade them about the urgency of lending the image to Tiwi since the fiesta was approaching. However, it was only after the encouragement and assurance of the image's return by their parish priest that the people reluctantly lent the image.

On 6 August 1920, a cohort led by Bernales arrived in Joroan to retrieve the image. Before the image was taken, Bernales reassured the people that the image shall be returned after fifteen days, as its absence from the altar made the people of Joroan so anxious that they never lost track of the fifteen-day promise. However, on seeing Tiwi had not yet returned the image even though the fifteen-day agreement had already lapsed, the people dispatched a big boat there to remind Bernales and retrieve the image.

==== The August Riot ====
When Fulay greeted Bernales, the latter was compelled to return the image. A huge number of people from Tiwi were present in the church to bid the image farewell. However, when the image was about to be handed over to Fulay, a bystander screamed and seized the image from Bernales. The visitors from Joroan cried foul and rioting ensued.

The message was clear: the people of Tiwi refused to give back the image by violently declaring that the image was theirs. This claim is backed by the alleged testimony of the elders of Tiwi that the image in question was just a copy of the original: the copy belonged to Tiwi, while the original belonged to Joroan. Folklore held that in those days there was an antique image of Our Lady of Salvation, and that the image's Hermana Mayora was a certain Mitay. When it was still in a good condition, it was brought down to the chapel whenever the contested image was in Tiwi, but that it had already deteriorated with age. The people of Joroan supposedly had abandoned it, and gave the title of Our Lady of Salvation to the present image.

==== Final settlement ====
Fulay, seeing that the brawl would do no good, advised his parishioners to go home instead. He then wrote a letter to Bishop McGinley about the heightened tensions between the peoples of Joroan and Tiwi. In response, McGinley reassured Joroan that the image will be returned to them. Owing to the previous rioting, the image was kept in the house of Vicente de Vera for over a month, and it was only on 28 September of that year that the image was returned to Joroan.

To prevent further violence, Bishop McGinley on 18 August 1920 declared that:

“We suppress and cancel by this presents [the clause “fifteen days consecutive”] and confirm the rest of the said Decree reserving to us. However, the right to take measure we deem necessary to avoid or suppress abuses which may arise in the cult of the image, and to vindicate our exclusive right over the image in reference”. (Note: Original Spanish Text: Suprimimos y cancelamos por el presente y confirmamos el resto de dicho decreto, reservándonos sin embargo el derecho de tomar quantas medidas juzgaremos necesarias para evitar o suprimir abusos que pudierán surgír en el culto de la imagen y para vindicar nuestra exclusivo propiedad en la imagen de referencia. (Libro de Ordenes, no. 1, Tiwi, p 44))

To keep the ardour of the same Marian devotion in Tiwi and to prevent further tensions, McGinley also permitted the creation of a replica for Tiwi. The original image has been permanently enshrined in Joroan since 1920.

=== Later years ===
==== Church recognition ====
On 8 December 1975, Teotimo Pacis, the Bishop of Legazpi, formally declared the Virgin Mary, under the title of Our Lady of Salvation, as the heavenly patroness of Albay. In 1976, the Diocese formally celebrated the Bicentennial Jubilee of its patroness. One of the projects during the Bicentennial was the completion of the shrine. The original design of the shrine was the handiwork of Juanito Pelea of Tiwi, but was later redesigned and finished under the supervision of Fidel Siapno of Legazpi City. After its completion, Bishop Pacis blessed the shrine on 21 August 1976. The Archbishop of Manila, Cardinal Jaime Sin episcopally crowned Our Lady of Salvation, with Joroan Church proclaimed a Diocesan shrine on 25 August 1976.

On 7 February 1977, the Holy See officially proclaimed Our Lady of Salvation as the Patroness of the Diocese of Legazpi.

On 28 October 2026, the image received its Pontifical coronation granted by Pope Leo XIV during a Mass celebrated by Cardinal Luis Antonio Tagle, Dean of the College of Cardinals, at Legazpi Cathedral.

== Veneration ==
Every year, during the month of August until September, devotees from all over the Bicol Region visit the Shrine of Our Lady of Salvation in Joroan. The last Saturday of August is traditionally reserved as a special day of veneration wherein pilgrims walk in procession for 9 km from Saint Lawrence' Church in Tiwi to the Diocesan Shrine in Joroan.

In barangay of Pasadena in San Juan, Metro Manila, a replica of the image is fêted on the third weekend of May with a Mass and procession. The feast is celebrated in May as the anniversary of the area being unharmed during a typhoon in the 1970s, the devotion having been introduced by Bicolano transplants.

In the barangay of Caridad, Culasi, Antique, the fiesta is celebrated every end of the month of May. It starts on the vísperas or eve of the feast on 28 May, with the feast day on 29 May. The image of Nuestra Señora de Salvación was donated by the Cadiena-Española family.

In the barangay of Guinbanga-an, Laua-an, Antique, the people celebrate the image during their annual fiesta from 25–26 November, with a procession and Mass on the second day. The new images of Nuestra Señora de Salvación were donated by the Berte-Dolendo-Pepatco-Samillano family, heirs of Tongcua-Luces family.

== Gallery ==
Our Lady of Salvation
Nuestra Señora de Salvación
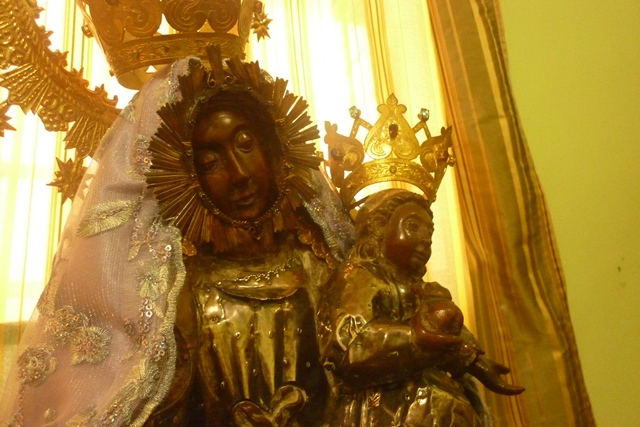
Faces of the Virgin and Child on the original image of Our Lady of Salvation

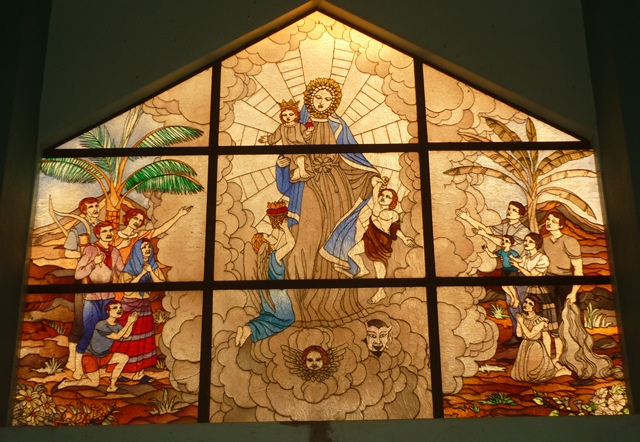
The Virgin on the stained glass window on the façade of Joroan Church, seen from the inside

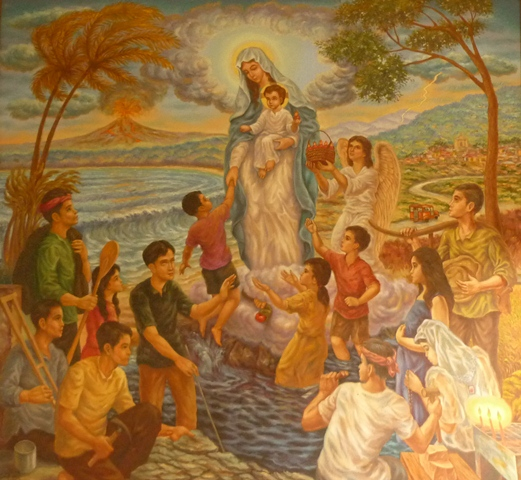
Fresco of Our Lady of Salvation at the convento of Joroan Church. The scenery depicts the town's approximate location relative to the sea and Mount Mayon, the region's iconic active volcano (shown in the background).

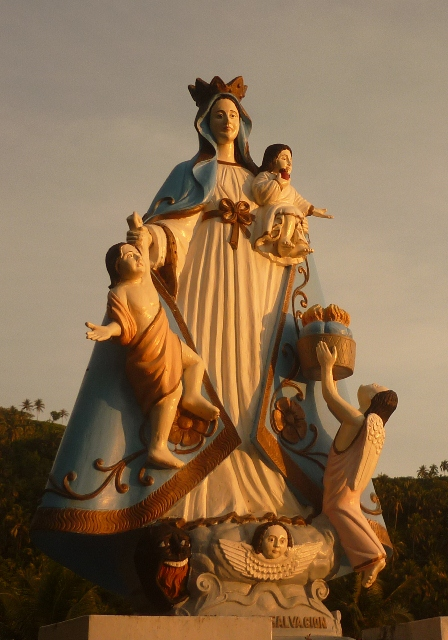
Concrete outdoor replica of Our Lady of Salvation on the grounds of Joroan Church
