= Tiwi, Albay =

Municipality in Albay, Philippines

Tiwi
- Municipality
- Municipality of Tiwi
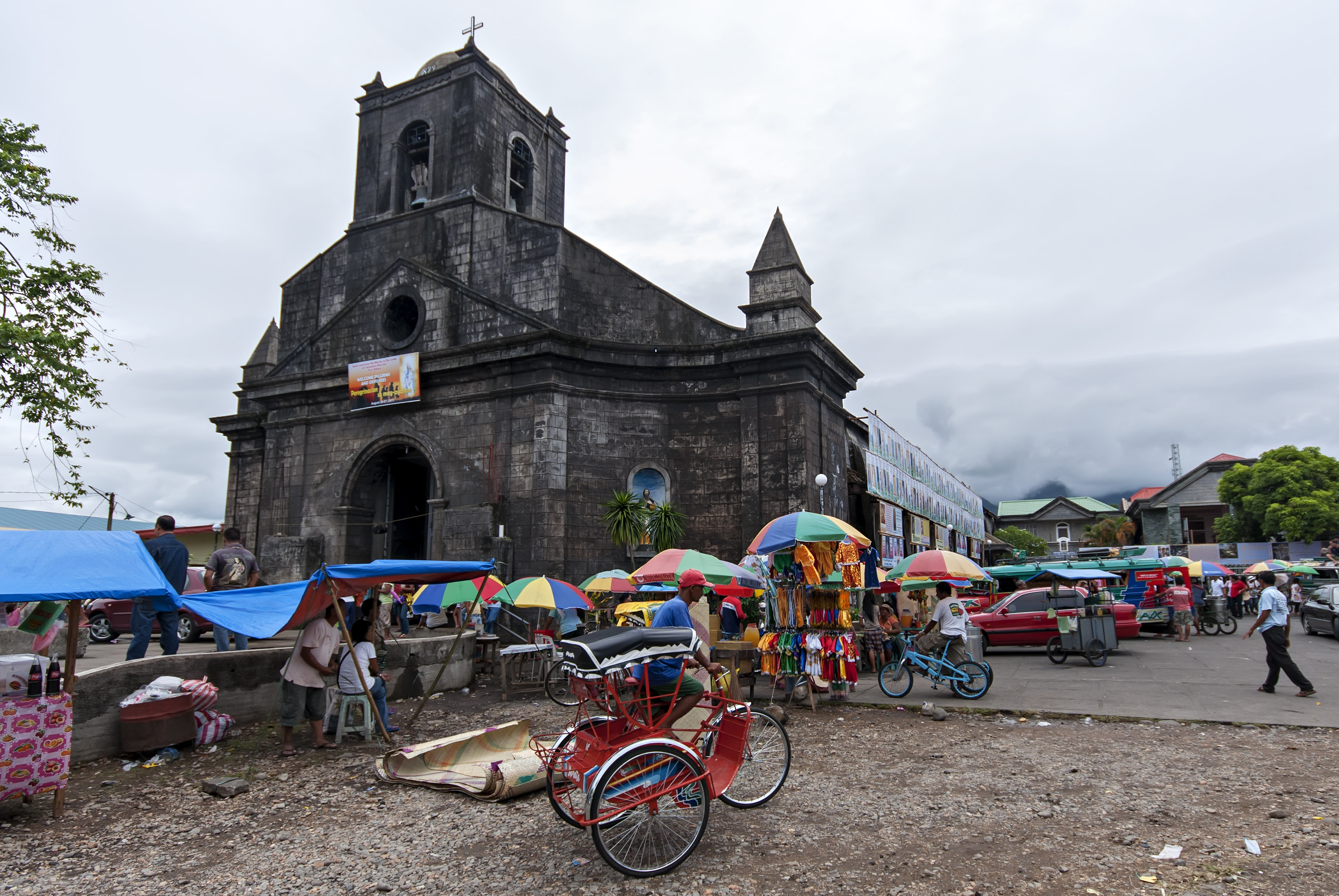
- Tiwi Church

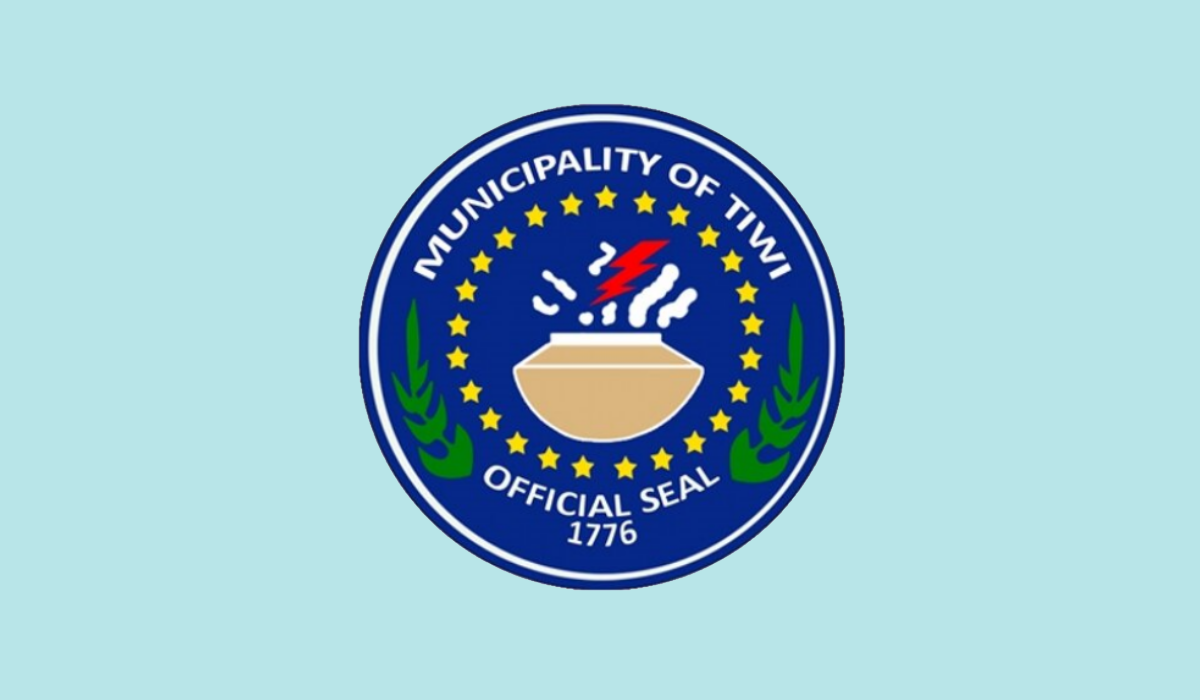
- Flag

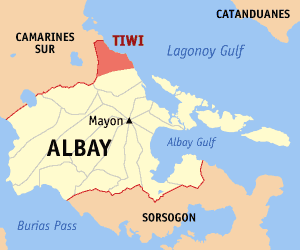
- Map of Albay with Tiwi highlighted
- Interactive map of Tiwi
- Location within the Philippines
- Coordinates: 13°27′31″N 123°40′50″E
- Country: Philippines
- Region: Bicol Region
- Province: Albay
- District: 1st district
- Founded: 1696
- Barangays: 25 (see Barangays)

Government
  - Type: Sangguniang Bayan
  - Mayor: Jose Morel C. Climaco
  - Vice Mayor: Jaime C. Villanueva
  - Representative: Krisel Lagman
  - Municipal Council: Members: Ma. Theresa B. Ciocson; Jerahmeel C. Clerigo; Edgardo L. Capa; Aiken C. Villanueva; Cherry Ann C. Oliquiano; Katherine N. Salcedo; Rey M. Kallos; Ryan Kevin R. Carlet
  - Electorate: 39,155 voters (2025)

Area
  - Total: 105.76 km^{2} (40.83 sq mi)
- Elevation: 61 m (200 ft)
- Highest elevation: 965 m (3,166 ft)
- Lowest elevation: 0 m (0 ft)

Population (2024 census)
  - Total: 56,871
  - Density: 537.74/km^{2} (1,392.7/sq mi)
  - Households: 12,657

Economy
  - Income class: 1st municipal income class
  - Poverty incidence: 27.27% (2023)
  - Revenue: ₱ 349.9 million (2024)
  - Assets: ₱ 1,179 million (2024)
  - Expenditure: ₱ 330.4 million (2024)
  - Liabilities: ₱ 590.5 million (2024)

Service provider
  - Electricity: Albay Electric Cooperative (ALECO)
- Time zone: UTC+8 (PST)
- ZIP code: 4513
- PSGC: 0500518000
- IDD : area code: +63 (0)52
- Native languages: Central Bikol; Tagalog
- Catholic diocese: Diocese of Legazpi
- Website: www.tiwi.gov.ph

Tiwi, officially the Municipality of Tiwi (Central Bikol: Banwaan kan Tiwi; Tagalog: Bayan ng Tiwi), is a municipality in the Province of Albay, Philippines. According to the 2024 census, it has a population of 56,871 people.

It is notable for its geothermal energy facilities and traditional pottery craft. It became the first water-based geothermal system in the world to generate more than 160 megawatts of power and now has an installed capacity of 289 MW. The town is also known for its coron, handcrafted pottery made in different shapes and sizes. Visitors can see the Tiwi Geothermal Power Plant from Naglagbong Geothermal People’s Park, often called Nag Park.

== Etymology ==
Friars called the place Tigbi, which evolved into Tivi and, then, finally to its present name Tiwi.

== History ==
Tiwi began as a barrio of Malinao before it was formally organized as a politically independent pueblo in 1696. As a pueblo, it was governed by a gobernadorcillo. As a Catholic parish, it was administered by a secular priest under the then Diocese of Nueva Caceres, now an archdiocese. In its primeval stages, it had some 1,105 houses, a parish church, a community-funded primary school, and a cemetery outside the town proper. The villagers ordinarily engaged in fishing, planting rice, corn, sugarcane, indigo, fruit-bearing trees, and vegetables. Aside from agriculture, they also busied themselves weaving cotton and abaca clothes, and in pottery.

In Kagnipa, known today as Barangay Baybay, stands the dilapidated Sinimbahan. It is the remnant of the first concrete house of worship built by the Franciscans led by the pastor of Malinao, Fray Pedro de Brosas, remains to be the deaf witness of both the villagers' ready acceptance of the Christian faith and their suffering of persecution at the hands of the Moslems; Christian missionaries called them Moros. The parola by the shore of Sitio Nipa of the same barangay testifies to the people's paralyzing fear of the Moros' capricious forays. The market site of the pueblo before these raids was located in the present location of Baybay Elementary School. In order to sidetrack surprise attacks, at least temporarily, the market site was transferred to southernmost part of now Barangay Baybay; henceforth, it was called Binanwaan. The transfer, however, was useless. Finally, to have enough time to escape and keep themselves safer from their enemies' easy attacks, the inhabitants moved the market site and their settlement to the present poblacion now named as Barangay Tigbi. Before the Moro's assaults, Barangay Baybay was then the center of trade and commerce because of its easy accessibility to marine transportation of goods. The goods came from the islands of what are now known as Catanduanes, San Miguel, Rapu-Rapu, and Batan, not to mention those from adjoining pueblos in the mainland of Ibalon, now the province of Albay, and the Camarines.

In the extant records of the municipality, the first chief executive of the municipal government was Don Lorenzo Mancilla installed in 1776. The 1818 census showed 2,669 native families paying tribute and they were coexisting with 157 Spanish-Filipino families.

== Geography ==
Tiwi is located at 13°27′31″N 123°40′50″E.

According to the Philippine Statistics Authority, the municipality has a land area of 105.76 square kilometres (40.83 sq mi) constituting 4.11% of the 2,575.77-square-kilometre- (994.51 sq mi) total area of Albay. Tiwi is 38 kilometres (24 mi) from Legazpi City and 565 kilometres (351 mi) from Manila.

=== Climate ===
Climate data for Tiwi, Albay
| Month | Jan | Feb | Mar | Apr | May | Jun | Jul | Aug | Sep | Oct | Nov | Dec | Year |
|---|---|---|---|---|---|---|---|---|---|---|---|---|---|
| Mean daily maximum °C (°F) | 27 (81) | 27 (81) | 28 (82) | 30 (86) | 31 (88) | 30 (86) | 29 (84) | 29 (84) | 29 (84) | 29 (84) | 28 (82) | 27 (81) | 29 (84) |
| Mean daily minimum °C (°F) | 22 (72) | 22 (72) | 23 (73) | 24 (75) | 25 (77) | 25 (77) | 25 (77) | 25 (77) | 25 (77) | 24 (75) | 24 (75) | 23 (73) | 24 (75) |
| Average precipitation mm (inches) | 138 (5.4) | 83 (3.3) | 74 (2.9) | 50 (2.0) | 108 (4.3) | 165 (6.5) | 202 (8.0) | 165 (6.5) | 190 (7.5) | 186 (7.3) | 188 (7.4) | 183 (7.2) | 1,732 (68.3) |
| Average rainy days | 16.8 | 11.9 | 13.5 | 13.8 | 20.5 | 25.2 | 27.4 | 26.2 | 26.1 | 24.7 | 20.7 | 18.5 | 245.3 |
Source: Meteoblue

=== Barangays ===
Tiwi is politically subdivided into 25 barangays. Each barangay consists of puroks and some have sitios.

| PSGC | Barangay | Population | | | ±% p.a. | |
| | | 2024 | | 2010 | | |
|---|---|---|---|---|---|---|
| 050518001 | Bagumbayan | 4.1% | 2,315 | 2,148 | ▴ | 0.52% |
| 050518002 | Bariis | 1.9% | 1,092 | 921 | ▴ | 1.19% |
| 050518003 | Baybay | 4.0% | 2,265 | 2,207 | ▴ | 0.18% |
| 050518004 | Belen (Malabog) | 2.5% | 1,406 | 1,273 | ▴ | 0.69% |
| 050518005 | Biyong | 3.0% | 1,680 | 1,543 | ▴ | 0.59% |
| 050518006 | Bolo | 2.1% | 1,205 | 1,173 | ▴ | 0.19% |
| 050518007 | Cale | 9.8% | 5,557 | 5,245 | ▴ | 0.40% |
| 050518008 | Cararayan | 3.5% | 2,012 | 2,011 | ▴ | 0.00% |
| 050518009 | Coro-coro | 3.1% | 1,747 | 1,587 | ▴ | 0.67% |
| 050518010 | Dap-dap | 1.6% | 891 | 765 | ▴ | 1.06% |
| 050518011 | Gajo | 2.7% | 1,536 | 1,489 | ▴ | 0.22% |
| 050518012 | Joroan | 4.8% | 2,741 | 2,667 | ▴ | 0.19% |
| 050518013 | Libjo | 5.2% | 2,936 | 2,624 | ▴ | 0.78% |
| 050518014 | Libtong | 4.1% | 2,304 | 2,253 | ▴ | 0.16% |
| 050518017 | Matalibong | 2.5% | 1,397 | 1,290 | ▴ | 0.55% |
| 050518018 | Maynonong | 1.4% | 824 | 674 | ▴ | 1.40% |
| 050518019 | Mayong | 2.9% | 1,632 | 1,660 | ▾ | −0.12% |
| 050518020 | Misibis | 3.9% | 2,192 | 2,064 | ▴ | 0.42% |
| 050518021 | Naga | 8.1% | 4,629 | 4,614 | ▴ | 0.02% |
| 050518023 | Nagas | 5.6% | 3,206 | 2,925 | ▴ | 0.64% |
| 050518024 | Oyama | 2.3% | 1,289 | 1,208 | ▴ | 0.45% |
| 050518025 | Putsan | 2.2% | 1,234 | 1,186 | ▴ | 0.28% |
| 050518026 | San Bernardo | 3.1% | 1,759 | 1,530 | ▴ | 0.97% |
| 050518027 | Sogod | 3.7% | 2,103 | 1,993 | ▴ | 0.37% |
| 050518028 | Tigbi (Poblacion) | 5.6% | 3,168 | 3,113 | ▴ | 0.12% |
| | Total | | 56,871 | 50,163 | ▴ | 0.87% |

Lourdes is another Barangay in the Municipality of Tiwi, Albay.

== Demographics ==
Population census of Tiwi
| Year | Pop. | ±% p.a. |
|---|---|---|
| 1903 | 9,593 | — |
| 1918 | 10,557 | +0.64% |
| 1939 | 12,539 | +0.82% |
| 1948 | 14,350 | +1.51% |
| 1960 | 17,691 | +1.76% |
| 1970 | 22,037 | +2.22% |
| 1975 | 24,350 | +2.02% |
| 1980 | 28,726 | +3.36% |
| 1990 | 34,658 | +1.90% |
| 1995 | 39,733 | +2.59% |
| 2000 | 44,261 | +2.34% |
| 2007 | 49,185 | +1.47% |
| 2010 | 50,163 | +0.72% |
| 2015 | 53,120 | +1.10% |
| 2020 | 56,444 | +1.29% |
| 2024 | 56,871 | +0.18% |
Source: Philippine Statistics Authority

In the 2024 census, Tiwi had a population of 56,871 people. The population density was 540 inhabitants per square kilometre (1,400/sq mi).

=== Religion ===
Roman Catholicism remained the dominant religion since its propagation in the town 1696.

=== Language ===
Generally the town speaks Central Bikol as their first language while others speak Buhinon in the areas near Buhi, Camarines Sur. Other Bikol languages are spoken by significant minorities that are from other areas of the Bicol Region.

The majority of the inhabitants also understand Tagalog (Filipino) and English as second languages.

== Economy ==
Poverty incidence of Tiwi (%)

Source: Philippine Statistics Authority

== Tourism ==
- Parish Church of Our Lady of Salvation, Barangay Joroan
- Parish Church of St. Lawrence, Deacon & Martyr, Barangay Tigbi
- Tiwi Hot Springs Resorts/Mendoza & Mirasol Resorts - Barangay Naga
- Corangon Shoal, Barangay Baybay
- PhilCeramics, Barangay Putsan
- Naglagbong Park and Science Centrum Museum, Barangay Naga
- Rangasa Spring Resort
- Sinimbahan Ruins, Barangay Baybay
- Japanese Garden, Barangay Tigbi
- Bugsukan Falls, Barangay Misibis
- Baybay-Bolo Beach
- Sogod Beach
- Maslog Waterfalls, Barangay Misibis
- Tiwi Geothermal Power Plant
- DJC Halo-Halo
- Capantagan Waterfalls, Barangay Cale

== Culture ==
=== Coron festival ===
The town celebrates every year in August since 2006, the Coron Festival, where spectators enjoy a civic and float parade that showcase the town’s cultural heritage and its well-known pottery industry.

== Education ==
The Tiwi Schools District Office governs all educational institutions within the municipality. It oversees the management and operations of all private and public, from primary to secondary schools.

=== Primary and elementary schools ===
- Bagumbayan Elementary School
- Bariis Elementary School
- Baybay Elementary School
- Belen Elementary School
- Biyong Elementary School
- Bolo Elementary School
- Cale Elementary School
- Cararayan-Naga Elementary School
- Dapdap Elementary School
- Joroan Elementary School
- Libjo Elementary School
- Libtong Elementary School
- Lourdes Elementary School
- Maynonong Elementary School
- Mayong Elementary School
- Misibis Elementary School
- Nagas Elementary School
- Putsan Elementary School
- San Bernardo Elementary School
- Spectrum Learning Center
- Sto. Cristo Elementary School
- Sugod Elementary School
- Tabgon Elementary Schoo
- Tiwi Central School

=== Secondary schools ===
- Joroan High School
- Naga National High School
- Tiwi Agro-Industrial School

=== Higher educational institution ===
- Our Lady of Salvacion College
- Tiwi Community College

== Notable people ==
- Aida Cirujales (born 1952), retired Bicolana public school teacher, writer and songwriter
- Zeus Salazar (born 1932), Filipino historian, anthropologist, and writer

== Gallery ==
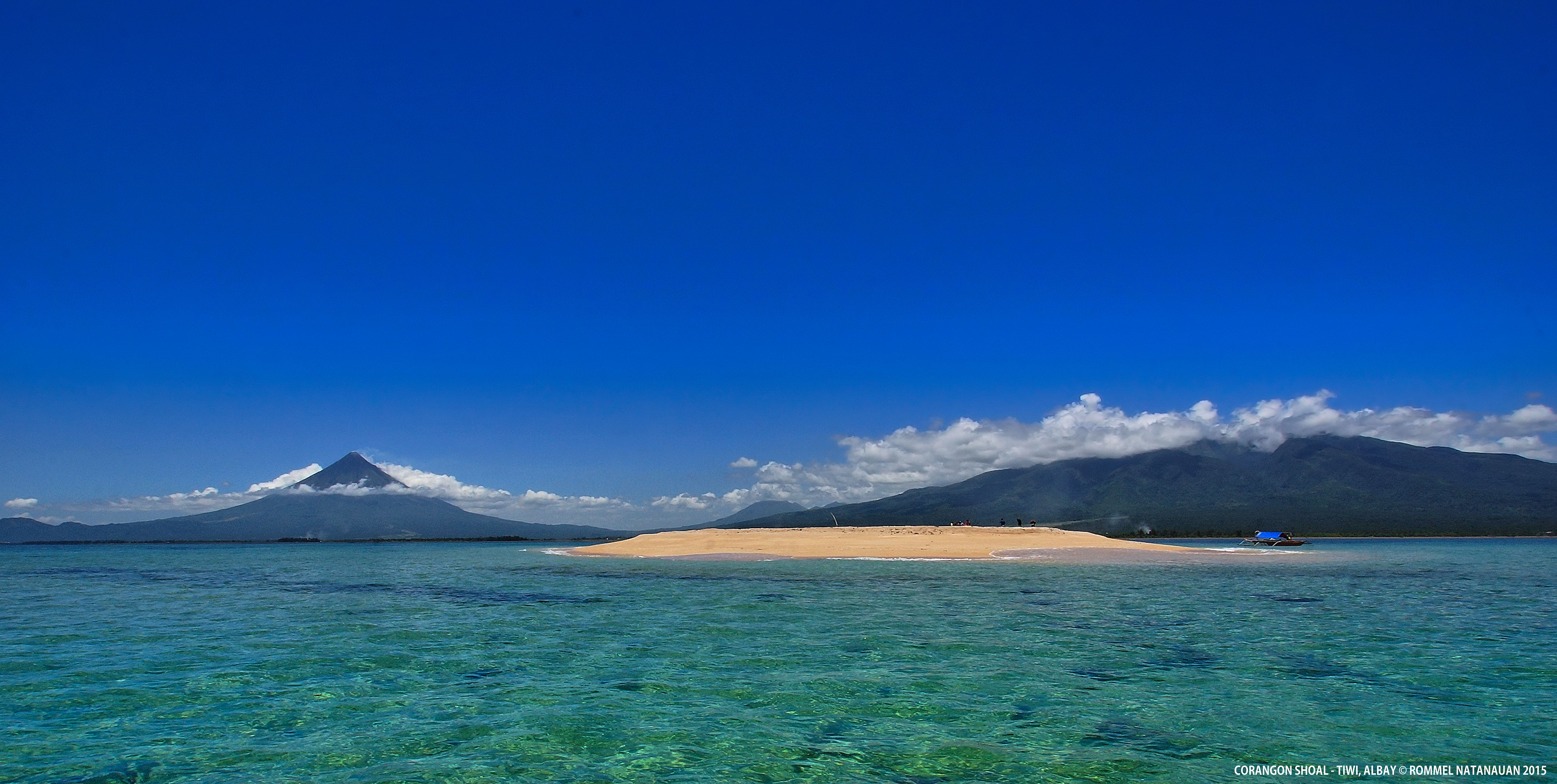
Corangon shoal, made up of mainly crushed corals and white sand, is about 15 minutes boat ride from the shore of barangay Baybay. Mounts Mayon (left), Masaraga (center) and Malinao (right) serve as the background.

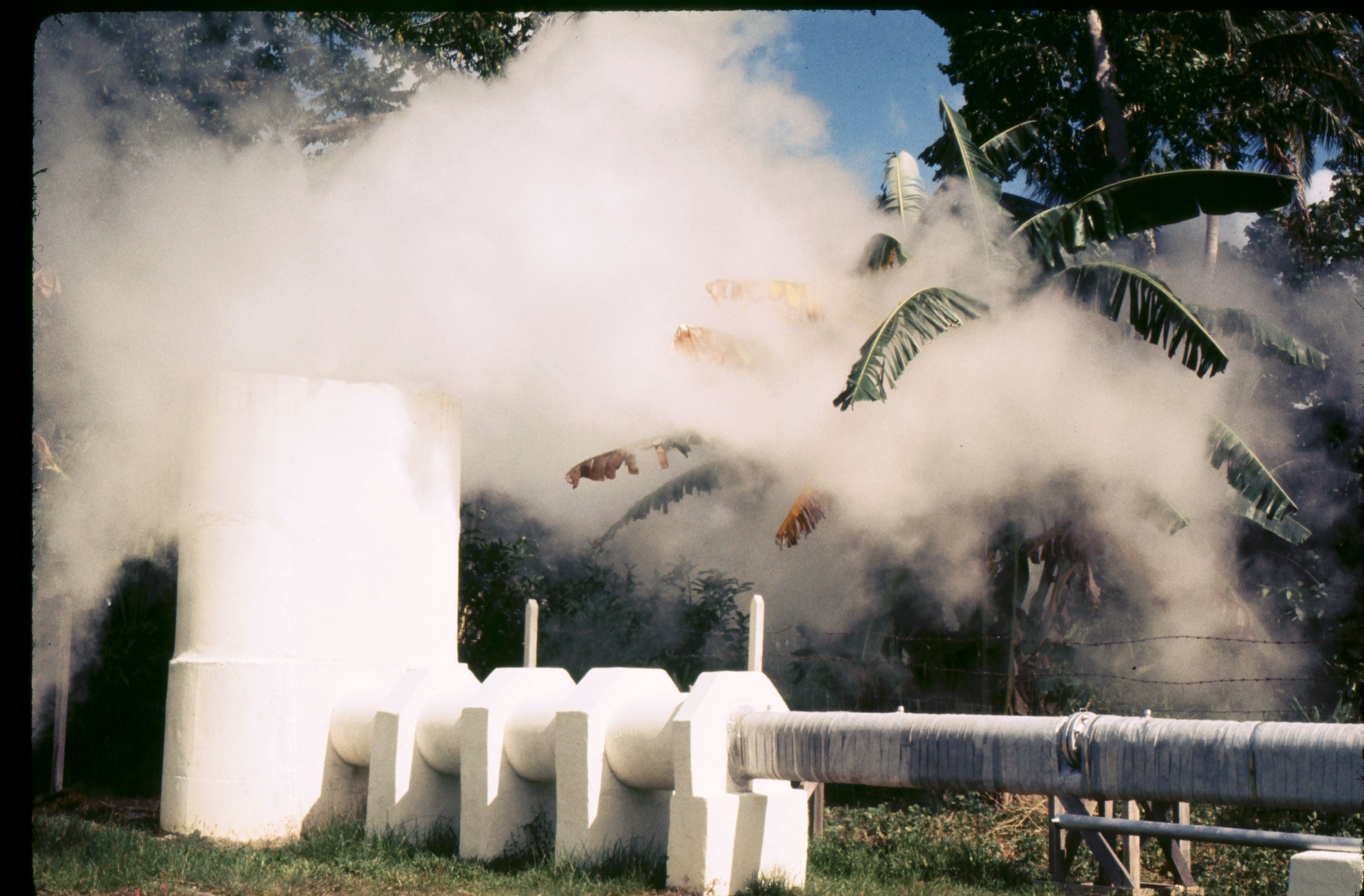
Tiwi Geothermal Plant

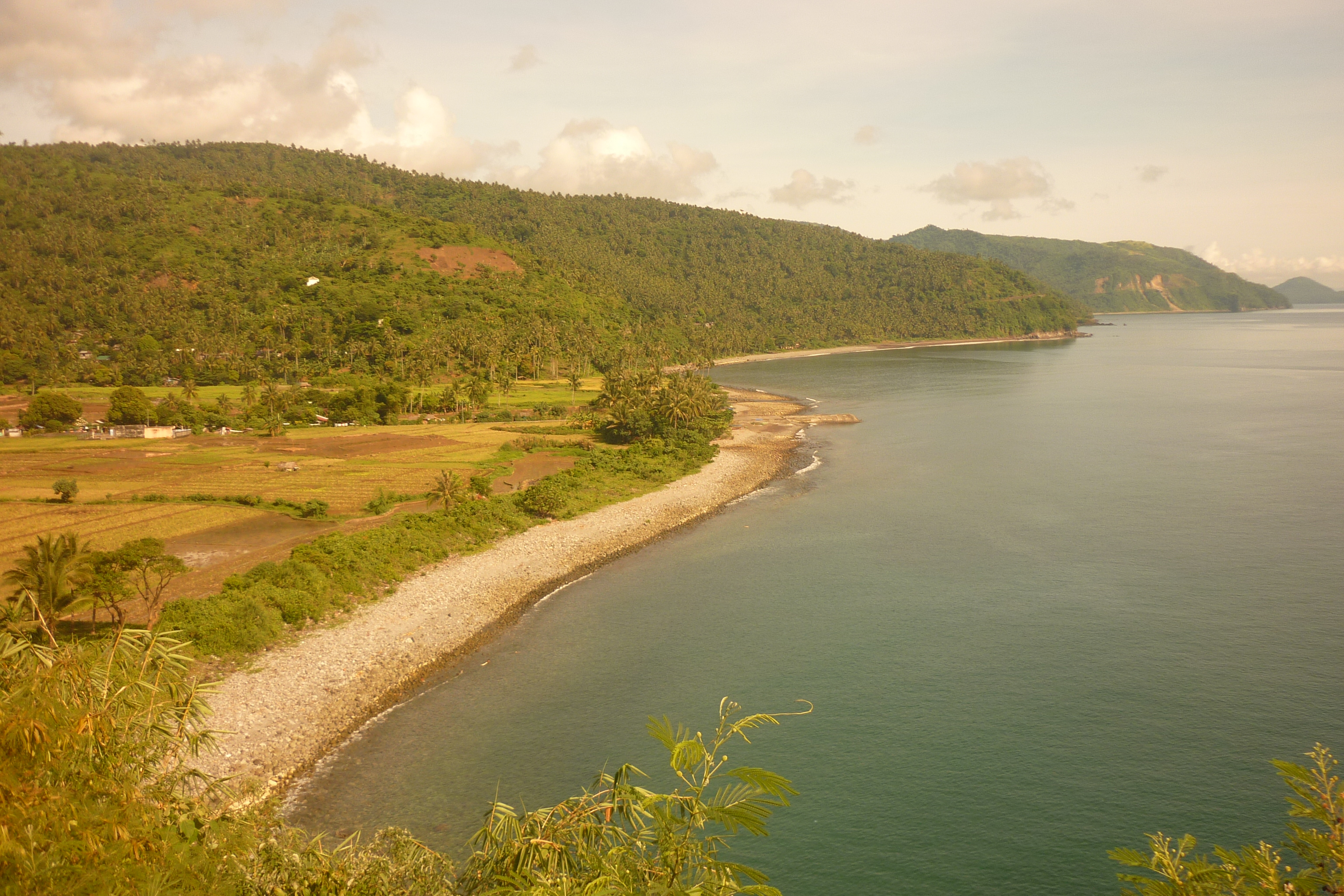
Joroan Beach

== See also ==
- Tiwi Geothermal Power Plant
