= Nabala (Mauretania) =

Roman Empire - Mauretania Caesariensis (125 AD)

Nabala (Latin: Dioecesis Nabalensis) was an ancient Roman–Berber diocese in the province of Mauretania Caesariensis, located in present-day Algeria. No ancient bishops are known from the diocese, although it was vacant in 484; similarly, the seat of the bishopric remains unknown. Today, Nabala survives as a suppressed and titular bishopric of the Roman Catholic Church. The current holder of the see is Lucilo Quiambao, a retired auxiliary bishop of Legazpi.
