= Nestor Cariño =

Filipino Roman Catholic bishop (1938–2025)

The Most Reverend Nestor Cariño D.D.
- Bishop Emeritus of Legazpi
- Archdiocese: Cáceres
- Diocese: Legazpi
- Appointed: April 1, 2005
- Installed: May 24, 2005
- Term ended: November 7, 2007
- Predecessor: José Crisologo Sorra
- Successor: Joel Baylon
- Previous posts: Auxiliary Bishop of Legazpi and Titular Bishop of Thibiuca (1978–1980); Bishop of Borongan (1980–1986); Titular Bishop of Acholla and Auxiliary Bishop of Daet (2003–2005)

Orders
- Ordination: December 31, 1961
- Consecration: May 31, 1978 by Bruno Torpigliani

Personal details
- Born: Nestor Celestial Cariño; September 8, 1938 Malinao, Albay, Commonwealth of the Philippines
- Died: May 24, 2025 (aged 86) San Juan, Metro Manila, Philippines
- Motto: Comfort my people
- Coat of arms

Styles of Nestor Cariño
- Reference style: His Excellency; The Most Reverend
- Spoken style: Your Excellency
- Religious style: Bishop

Nestor Celestial Cariño (September 8, 1938 – May 24, 2025) was a Filipino Roman Catholic prelate. He served as bishop of the Roman Catholic Diocese of Legazpi from 2005 to 2007.

== Biography ==
Cariño was born in Malinao, Albay on September 8, 1938. He was ordained a priest in 1961 and became auxiliary bishop of Legazpi in 1978. In 1980, he was appointed bishop of Borongan, serving until 1986 when he became secretary general of the Catholic Bishops' Conference of the Philippines. In 2001, Cariño was deployed to serve in Pasig. He was then appointed auxiliary bishop of Daet in 2003 and became bishop of Legazpi in 2005, serving until his retirement in 2007.

Cariño died at the Cardinal Santos Medical Center in San Juan, Metro Manila, on May 24, 2025, at the age of 86.

Catholic Church titles
Preceded by José Crisologo Sorra	Bishop of Legazpi; May 24, 2005 – November 7, 2007	Succeeded by Joel Baylon
Preceded by Henry Theophilus Howaniec	— TITULAR — Bishop of Acholla; June 11, 2003 – April 1, 2005	Succeeded by Eusebio L. Elizondo Almaguer
Preceded by Sincero Barcenilla Lucero	Bishop of Borongan; August 12, 1980 – January 31, 1986	Succeeded by Leonardo Yuzon Medroso
Preceded by Ippolito Rotoli	— TITULAR — Bishop of Thibiuca; May 31, 1978 – August 12, 1980	Succeeded by Patricio Hacbang Alo
