= Joel Baylon =

Filipino Roman Catholic bishop (born 1954)

The Most Reverend Joel Baylon
- Bishop of Legazpi
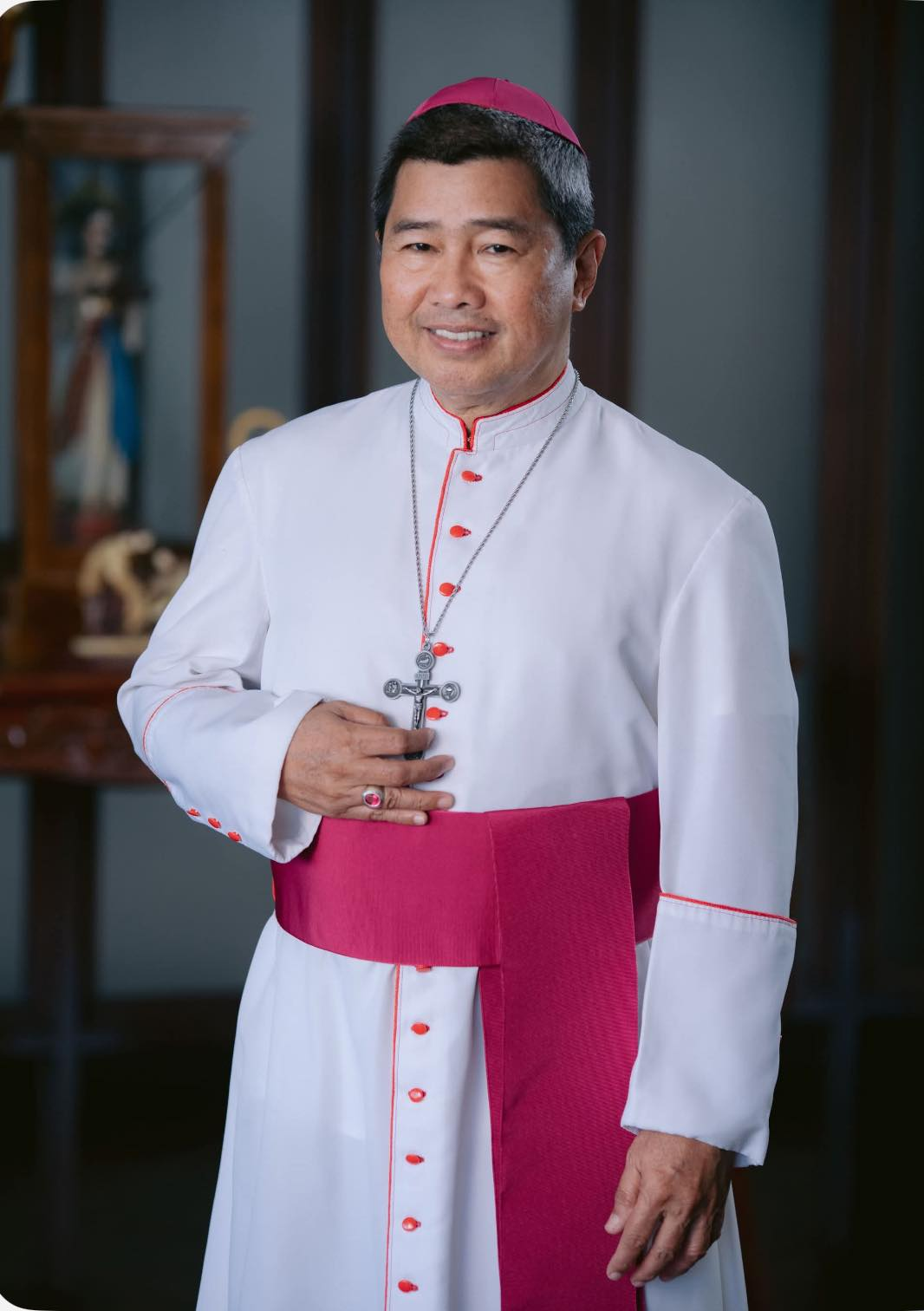
- Baylon in 2024
- Province: Caceres
- See: Legazpi
- Appointed: October 1, 2009
- Installed: December 14, 2009
- Predecessor: Nestor Cariño
- Previous post: Bishop of Masbate (1998–2009)

Orders
- Ordination: October 8, 1978
- Consecration: March 25, 1998 by Gian Vincenzo Moreni

Personal details
- Born: January 29, 1954 (age 72) Milaor, Camarines Sur, Philippines
- Motto: "Sub Tuum Praesidium" (Under Your Protection)
- Coat of arms

Styles of Joel Z. Baylon
- Reference style: His Excellency; The Most Reverend
- Spoken style: Your Excellency
- Religious style: Bishop

Joel Zamudio Baylon (born January 29, 1954) is a Filipino prelate of the Roman Catholic Church. He has been Bishop of Legazpi since 2009. Before this, he was Bishop of Masbate from 1998 to 2009.

== Early life and education ==
Baylon was born on January 29, 1954, in Milaor, Camarines Sur, which was then part of the Prelature of Libmanan.

He completed his elementary education at St. Peter's Academy in Polangui, Albay, from 1959 to 1965. For secondary education, he attended St. Gregory the Great Seminary in Tabaco, Albay, graduating in 1970. His college years were spent at Vianney Hall, a formation residence in the cathedral rectory of Legazpi City, from 1970 to 1975. He continued his studies at Divine Word College in Legazpi City before entering theological formation at the Tahanan ng Mabuting Pastol in Tagaytay City. From 1975 to 1979 he studied at Divine Word Seminary in Tagaytay.

Baylon later pursued further studies in the United States at Duquesne University in Pittsburgh and the University of California, Berkeley, earning a master's degree in formative spirituality from 1983 to 1985.

== Priesthood ==
Baylon was ordained a priest on October 8, 1978, for the Diocese of Legazpi. He then served in various capacities, including as a professor and spiritual director at the Minor Seminary of Legazpi, spiritual director at Holy Rosary Seminary in Naga City, and assistant secretary of the Catholic Bishops' Conference of the Philippines (CBCP). He was also the local attaché of the apostolic nunciature in Manila. On June 24, 1994, he received the title of Monsignor.

In 1995, he became the parish priest of St. Vincent Ferrer Parish in Bigaa, Legazpi City. The same year, he was also appointed Diocesan Family Life Commission director and later became director of the Bethlehem Inter-Diocesan Pastoral Center in Bacacay, Albay. Additionally, he was chairman of the Diocesan BEC Commission for the Diocese of Legazpi.

== Episcopal ministry ==
=== Bishop of Masbate ===
On February 14, 1998, Pope John Paul II appointed Baylon as Bishop of Masbate. He was consecrated as a bishop on March 25, 1998, at the Saint Gregory the Great Cathedral Parish in Legazpi City.

=== Bishop of Legazpi ===
On October 1, 2009, Pope Benedict XVI appointed Baylon as Bishop of Legazpi, succeeding Bishop Nestor Cariño. He was installed on December 14, 2009.

Within the Catholic Bishops' Conference of the Philippines, he was the chairman of the Episcopal Commission on Youth from 2007 to 2013. He was also chairman of the Episcopal Commission on Prison Pastoral Care from 2017 to 2023. As chairman he has actively promoted the humane treatment of people deprived of liberty (PDLs) and urged the church to support their rehabilitation and reintegration into society.

== Advocacy ==
Baylon has been a vocal advocate for environmental protection, particularly against illegal quarrying operations in the Bicol region.

During the 2018 eruption of Mayon Volcano, Baylon urged the faithful to remain calm, adhere to evacuation orders, and support those affected. He highlighted the diocese's readiness to assist evacuees through initiatives like HARONG, which had previously provided aid during similar events.

In November 2020, following the devastation caused by Super Typhoon Rolly, he called for an investigation into quarrying and mining operations on Mayon's slopes, suggesting that these activities may have exacerbated the lahar flows that buried numerous homes. Following severe flooding in November 2024, he urged the government to take action against unsustainable quarrying activities that contributed to the disaster.

Baylon has spoken against efforts to reinstate the death penalty in the Philippines. He has emphasized the importance of restorative justice and called on the Catholic faithful, especially youths, to influence public opinion on the issue.

Catholic Church titles
Preceded by Nestor Celestial Cariño	Bishop of Legazpi; December 10, 2009 – present	Incumbent
Preceded by Porfirio R. Iligan	Bishop of Masbate; March 25, 1998 – October 1, 2009	Succeeded by José S. Bantolo
