= Aida Cirujales =

Filipina teacher

Aida B. Cirujales
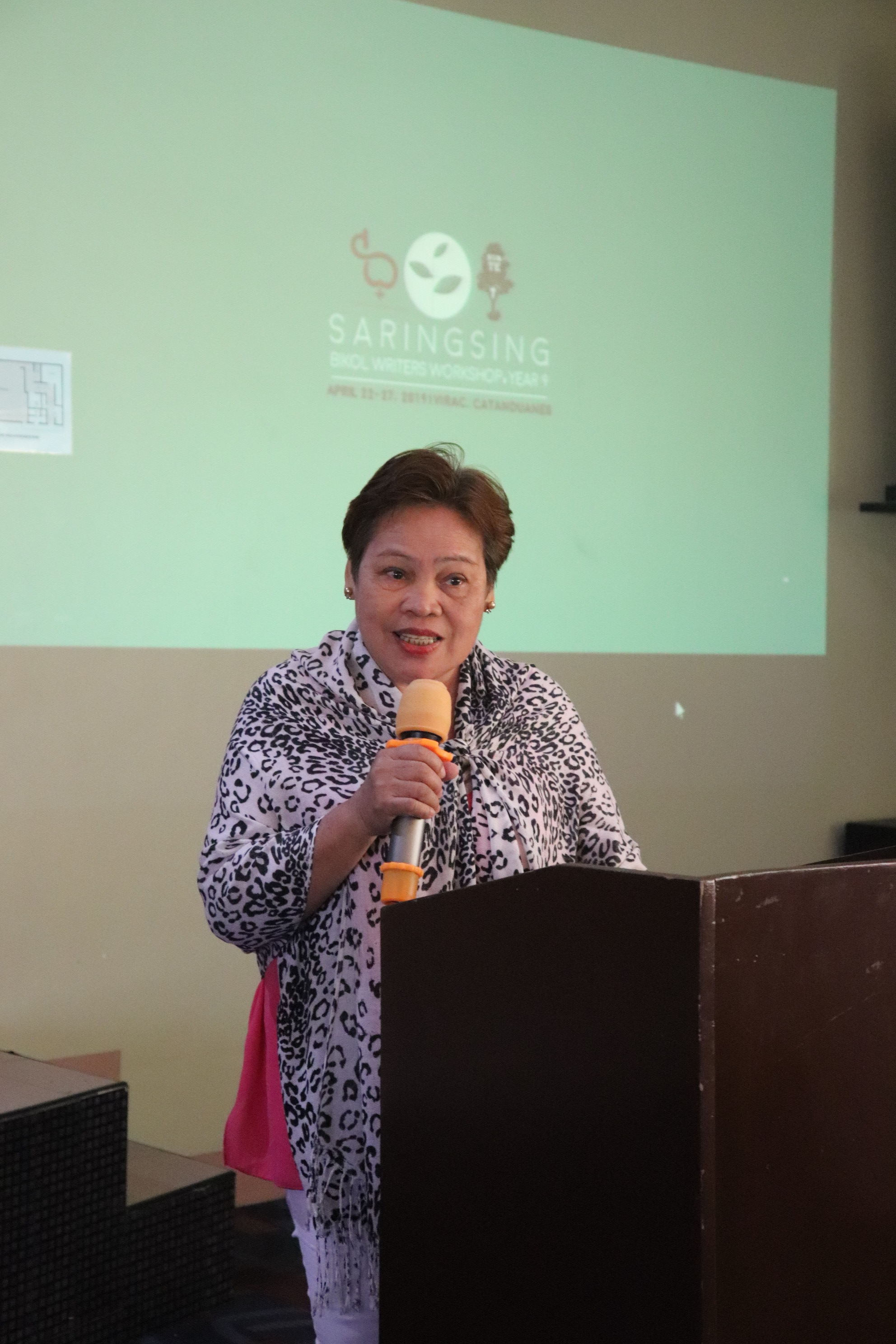
- Aida Cirujales (2019)
- Born: Tiwi, Albay, Albay
- Occupations: Retired teacher, writer
- Writing career
- Genre: Tigsik
- Notable works: Tigsik (NCCA, 2008)

Aida Brosas Cirujales (born June 5, 1952 in Tiwi, Albay, Philippines) is a retired Bicolana public school teacher, writer of tigsik, poem, poetic debate, Bikol debate, oration and songwriter. She is also known as "Tigsik Queen" in Camarines Sur. She taught at Gainza Central School until her retirement.

She became a panelist of Premio Tomas Arejola for Bicol Literature year 2007. Also a resident tigsik writer in Bikol Daily, Bicol Mail for the program "Sa Pagtabang Sana" in DZGE-Canaman, Camarines Sur, poetry and Bikol debate for the program "Taragboan" in the same station. Today, several of her writings can be read at the Bicol Standard-Bicol News.

She is the author of the book "Tigsik" published by the National Commission for Culture and the Arts (NCCA) in 2008. Cirujales is a member of Sumaro Bikolnon and Parasurat Bikolnon, two cultural organizations in Camarines Sur.

== Gallery ==
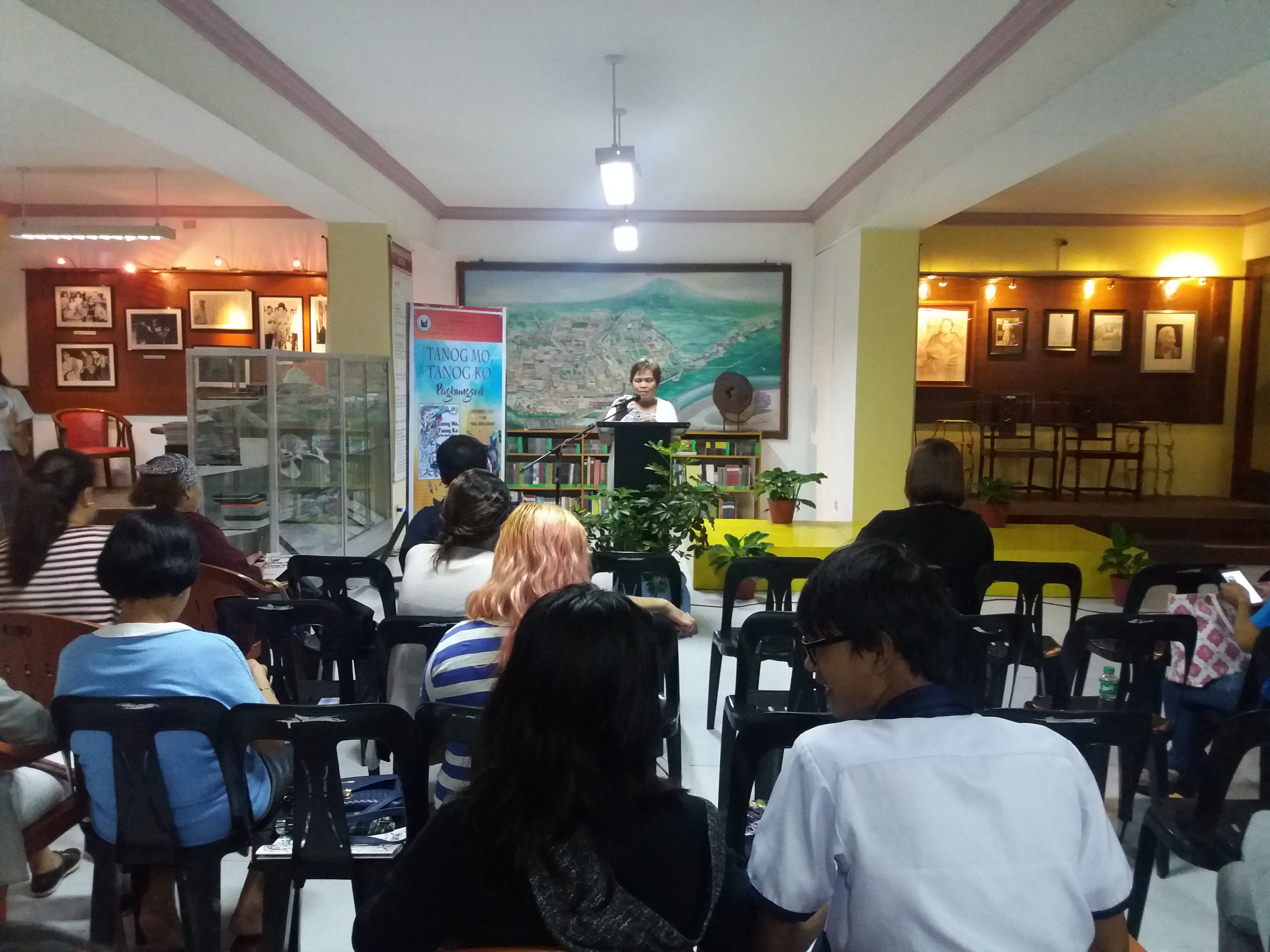
Aida Cirujales during the launching of her book Tanog Mo, Tanog Ko (2017) at Raul S. Roco Library

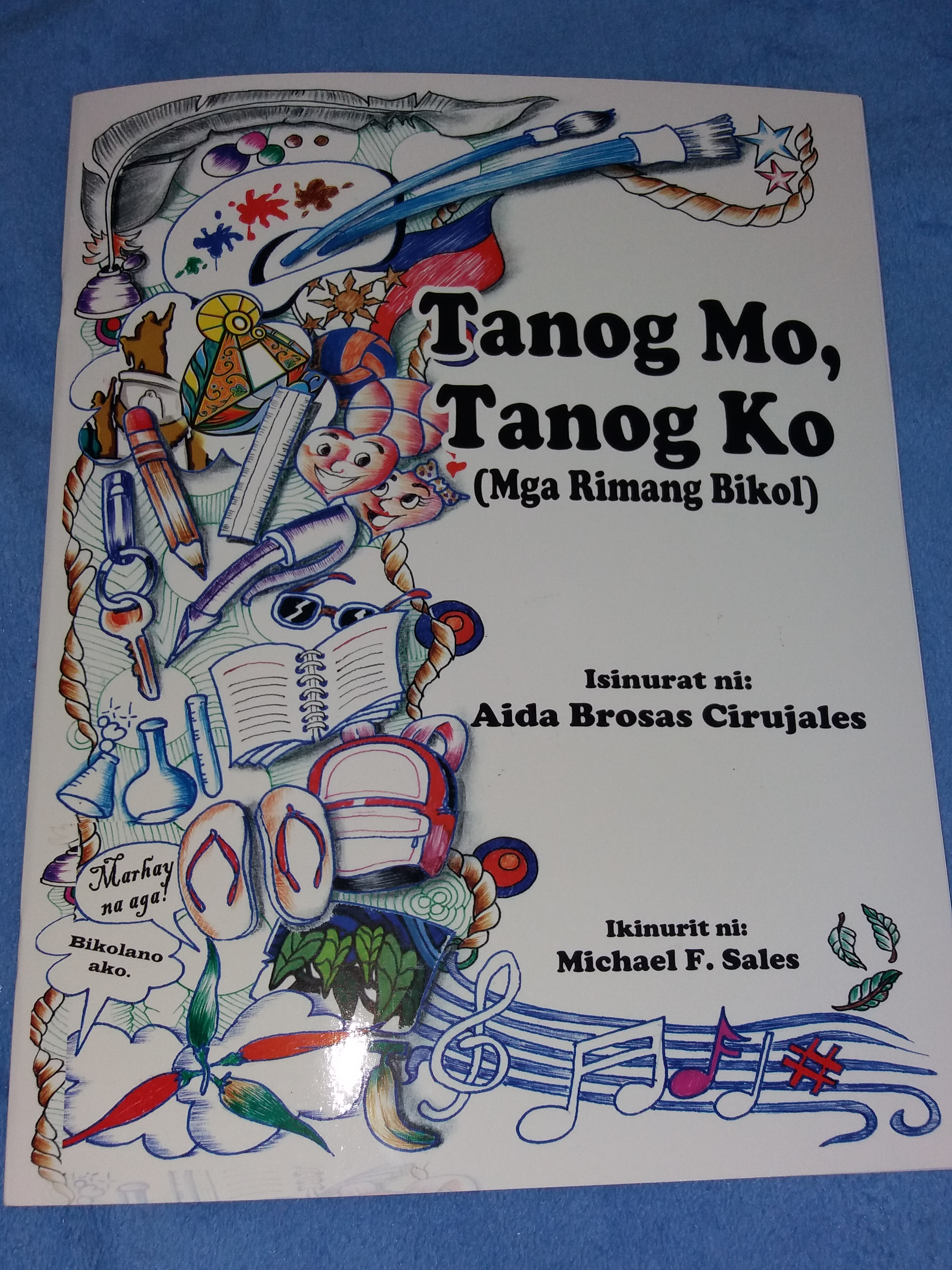
A copy of her book Tanog Mo, Tanog Ko (2017)

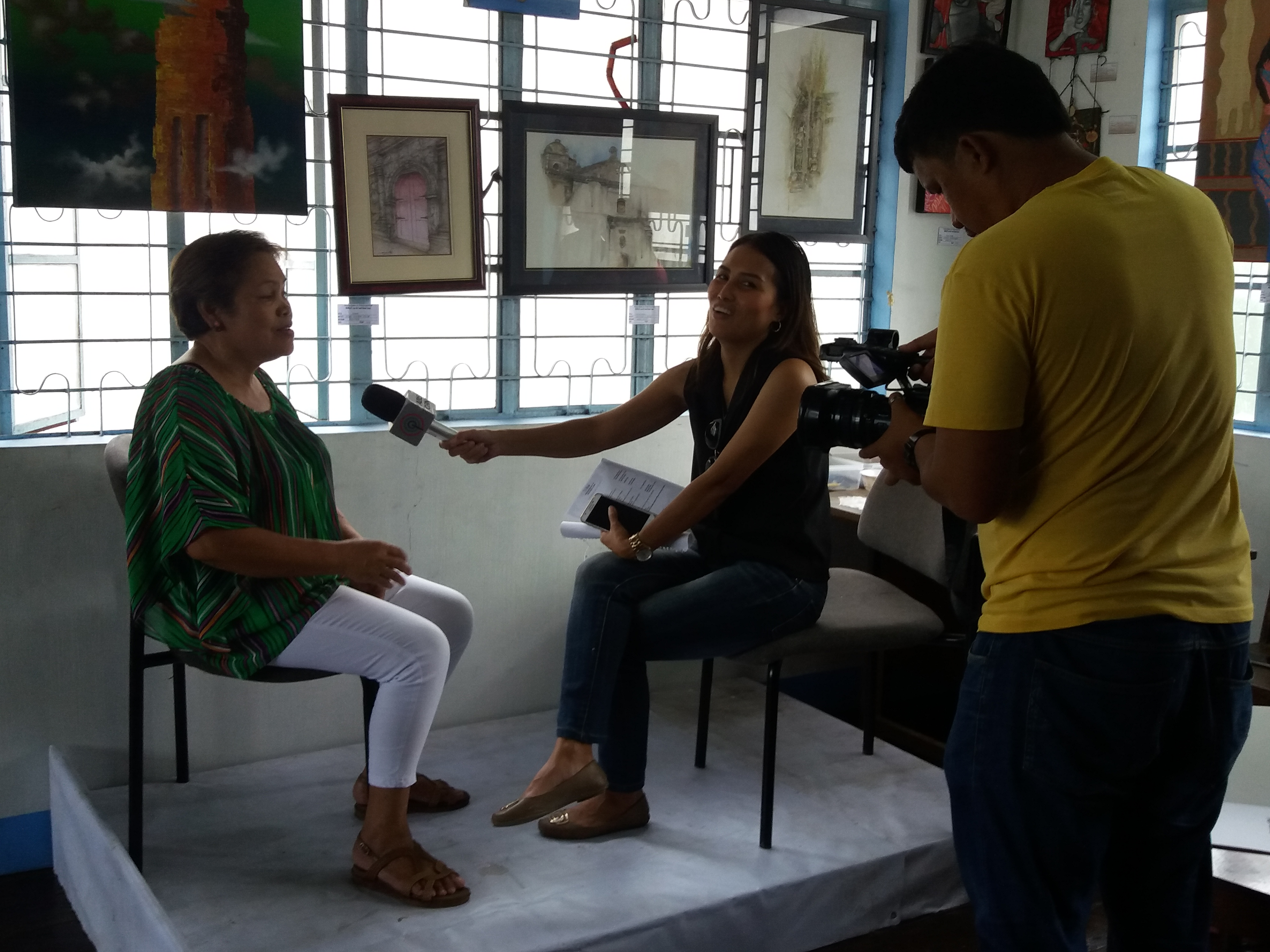
An interview by TV Patrol Bicol during Buklat Art and Book Expo 2018 in Naga City

== See also ==
- Merlinda Bobis
