= Tiwi Geothermal Power Plant =

Geothermal power station in Tiwi, Albay, Philippines

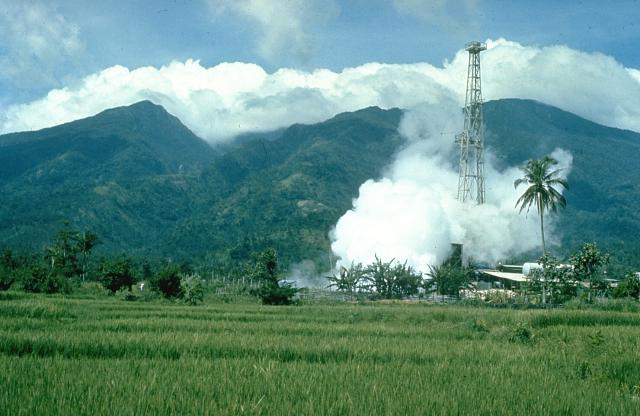
- Country: Philippines
- Location: Albay, Philippines
- Coordinates: 13°27′56.5″N 123°38′58.1″E
- Status: Operational
- Commission date: 1979
- Owner: AP Renewables
- Operator: AP Renewables

Geothermal power station
- Type: Flash steam (existing) / Binary cycle (planned)

Power generation
- Units operational: 4 units
- Units planned: 1 unit
- Nameplate capacity: 234 MW

The Tiwi Geothermal Power Plant is a 234-MW geothermal power station in Tiwi, Albay, Philippines.

== History ==
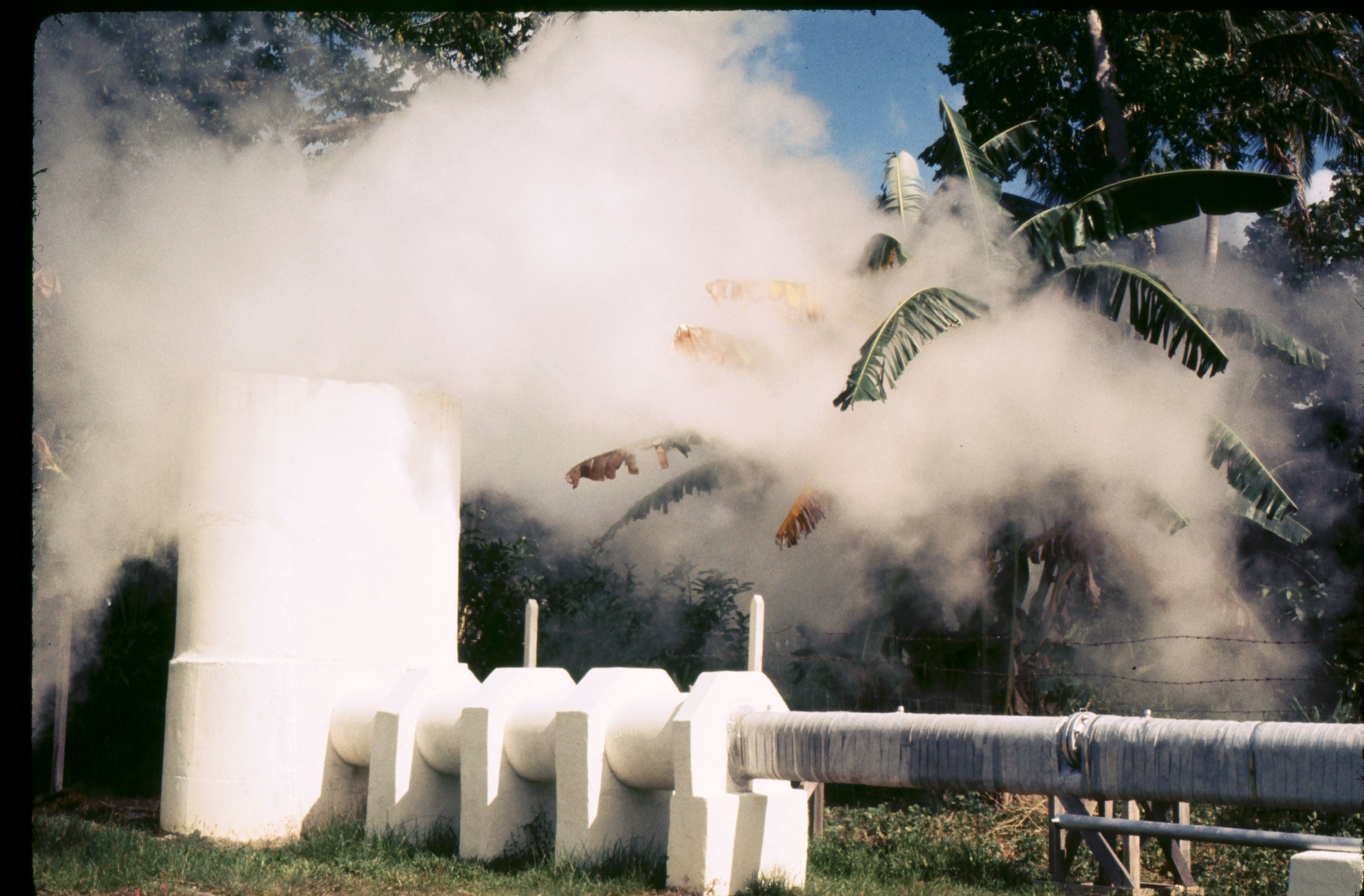
Pilot geothermal plant. 1970

The Commission on Volcanology conducted an exploration of the Tiwi geothermal field from 1964 to 1968.

The Philippine government in early 1971 invited the Union Oil Company of California (Unocal) to form the Philippine Geothermal, Inc. (PGI) which is intended as a joint venture for the exploration and development of geothermal energy. A service contract was made with the state-owned National Power Corporation (NPC) on September 10, 1971.

PGI contributed technical knowledge as well as a portion of the Tiwi field's exploration and development. NPC would construct and run the geothermal power stations. The first two units were put into service in 1979. Units 3 through 6 would be operational from 1980 to 1982.

The geothermal field would then be acquired by Aboitiz Power in 2009. The company would own and operate the plant under its subsidiary AP Renewables.

In January 2023, a new binary cycle power plant within the Tiwi Geothermal Power Plant broke ground. It will add 17-MW capacity to the existing geothermal complex.

== Facilities ==
The Tiwi Geothermal Field is divided into four geographical areas: Naglagbong, Kapipihan, Matalibong, and Bariis. At one point it had six units and a 330-MW capacity.

As of December 2021, the Tiwi geothermal facility has four units and a capacity of 234-MW.
