= Lucilo Quiambao =

Filipino Roman Catholic bishop (born 1932)

The Most Reverend Lucilo Quiambao D.D.
- Auxiliary Bishop Emeritus of Legazpi
- Church: Catholic Church
- Archdiocese: Caceres
- Diocese: Legazpi
- Appointed: 23 March 1982
- Term ended: 10 December 2009
- Other posts: Titular Bishop of Nabala (since 1982), Apostolic Administrator of Legazpi (1992–1993, 2007–2009)

Orders
- Ordination: 2 April 1960
- Consecration: 27 April 1982 by Jaime Sin

Personal details
- Born: Lucilo Barrameda Quiambao; 30 October 1932 (age 93) Bacacay, Albay, Philippines
- Coat of arms

Lucilo Barrameda Quiambao (born 30 October 1932) is a Filipino Roman Catholic prelate who served as auxiliary bishop of the Diocese of Legazpi from 1982 until his retirement in 2009.

== Early life and priesthood ==
Quiambao was born in Bacacay, Albay, on 30 October 1932. He was ordained to the priesthood for the Diocese of Legazpi on 2 April 1960.

Prior to his appointment as bishop, he served as vicar general of the Diocese of Legazpi.

== Episcopal ministry ==
On 23 March 1982, Pope John Paul II appointed Quiambao auxiliary bishop of Legazpi and titular bishop of Nabala. He received episcopal consecration on 27 April 1982 from Cardinal Jaime Sin.

According to UCA News, Quiambao served twice as apostolic administrator of the Diocese of Legazpi, first from 1992 to 1993 and later following the vacancy of the see in 2007.

On 10 December 2009, Pope Benedict XVI accepted his resignation as auxiliary bishop of Legazpi upon reaching the retirement age prescribed by canon law.

== Later life ==
In 2017, Quiambao joined other Catholic leaders in Albay in speaking out against extrajudicial killings and violence associated with the Philippine government's anti-drug campaign.
