= José Crisologo Sorra =

Catholic priest (1929–2021)

The Most Reverend José Crisologo Sorra D.D.
- Bishop Emeritus of Legazpi
- Church: Catholic Church
- Province: Caceres
- See: Legazpi
- Appointed: March 1, 1993
- Retired: April 1, 2005
- Predecessor: Concordio Maria Sarte
- Successor: Nestor Celestial Cariño
- Previous post: Bishop of Virac (1974–1993)

Orders
- Ordination: March 17, 1956
- Consecration: August 28, 1974 by Julio Rosales

Personal details
- Born: March 9, 1929 Malinao, Albay, Philippine Islands
- Died: January 21, 2021 (aged 91) Legazpi, Albay, Philippines
- Motto: Fiat ('Let it be so')
- Styles
- Reference style: His Excellency; The Most Reverend
- Spoken style: Your Excellency
- Religious style: Bishop

Jose Crisologo Sorra (9 March 1929 – 21 January 2021) was a Filipino Roman Catholic bishop.

Sorra was born in Malinao, Albay, in the Philippines and was ordained to the priesthood in 1956. He served as bishop of the Roman Catholic Diocese of Virac from 1974 to 1993 and as bishop of the Roman Catholic Diocese of Legazpi from 1993 to 2005. Upon his retirement, Sorra moved to Bacacay in a retreat center called Bethlehem. He died due to respiratory failure on January 21, 2021, in Legazpi.
