= Diocese of Legazpi =

Latin Catholic diocese in the Philippines

Diocese of Legazpi Diœcesis Legazpiensis Diocesis kan Legazpi Diyosesis ng Legazpi

Catholic
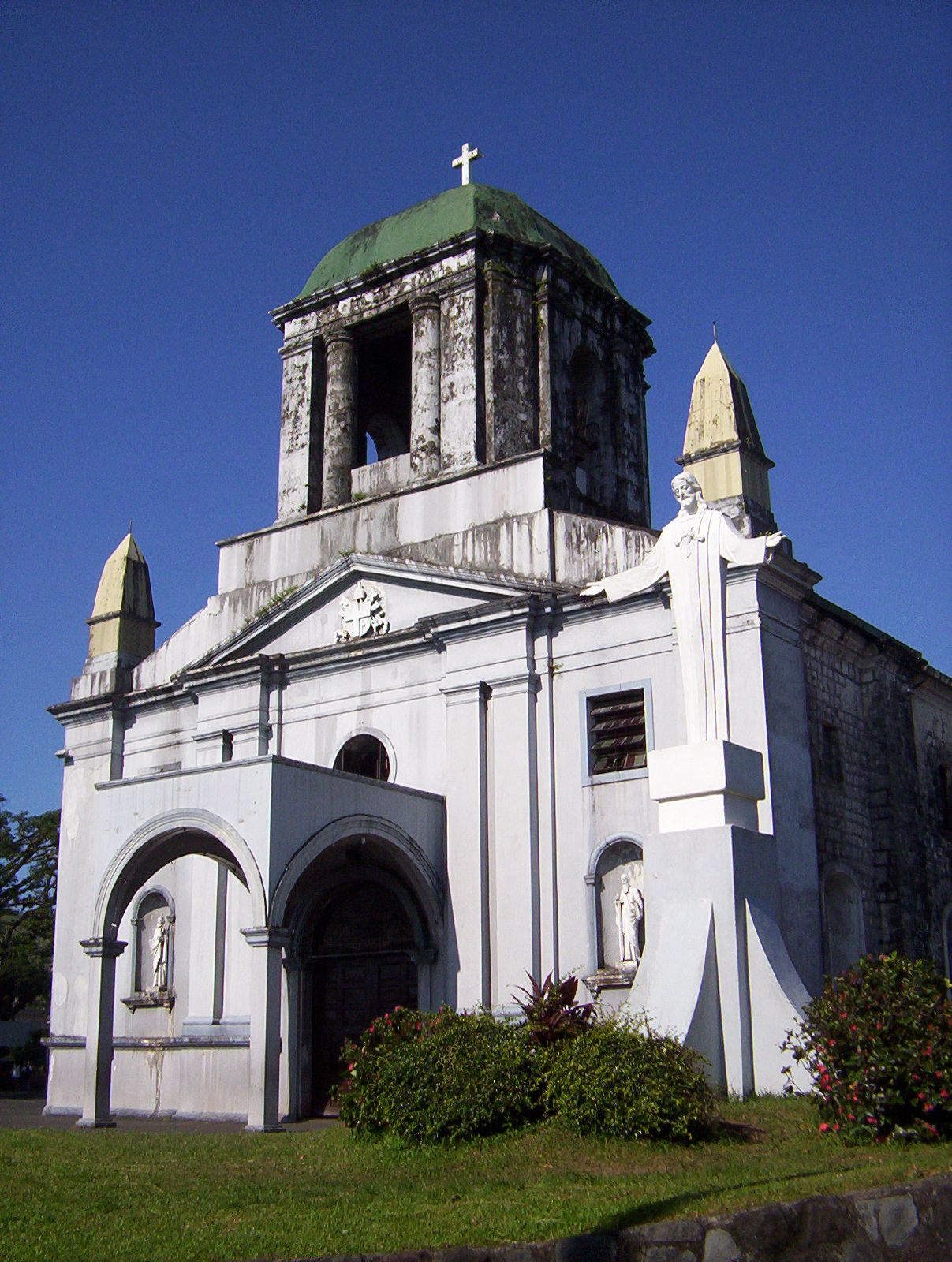
- Legazpi Cathedral

- Coat of arms

Location
- Country: Philippines
- Territory: Albay
- Ecclesiastical province: Caceres
- Metropolitan: Caceres
- Coordinates: 13.1384°N 123.7336°E

Statistics
- Area: 2,552 km^{2} (985 sq mi)
- Population: Total; Catholics: (as of 2021); 1,487,322; 1,376,482 (93.2%)
- Parishes: 49

Information
- Denomination: Catholic Church
- Sui iuris church: Latin Church
- Rite: Roman Rite
- Established: June 29, 1951
- Cathedral: Saint Gregory the Great Cathedral
- Patron saint: Our Lady of Salvation
- Secular priests: 101

Current leadership
- Pope: Leo XIV
- Bishop: Joel Zamudio Baylon
- Metropolitan Archbishop: Rex Andrew Alarcon
- Vicar General: Rev. Msgr. Crispin C. Bernarte, Jr., P.C. V.G. Rev. Msgr. Ramon C. Tronqued, P.C, V.G.
- Bishops emeritus: Lucilo Quiambao, auxiliary bishop emeritus (1982–2009)

Map
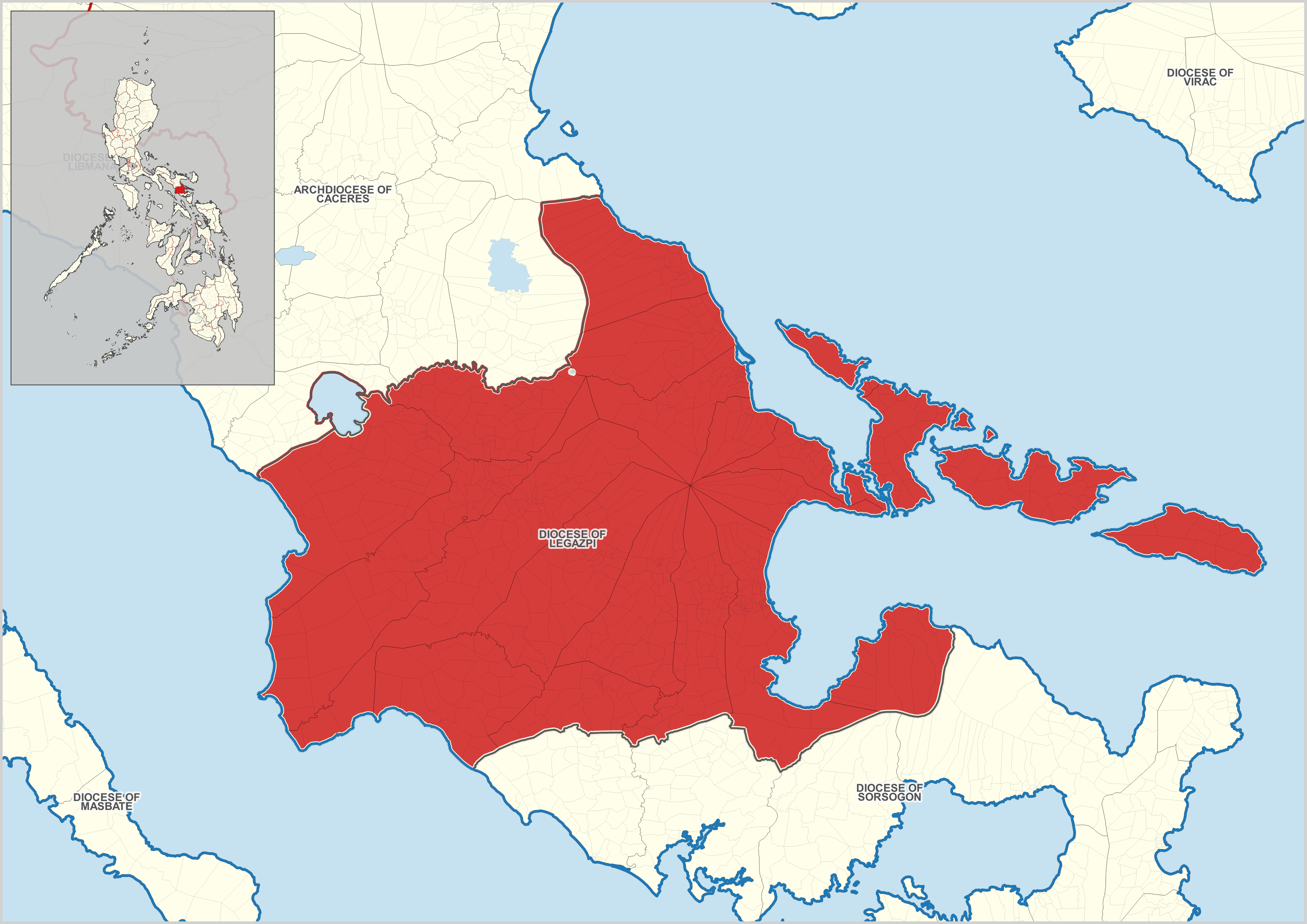
- Territorial jurisdiction of the Diocese of Legazpi

The Diocese of Legazpi (Latin: Dioecesis Legazpiensis) is a diocese of the Latin Church of the Catholic Church. It constitutes the entire province of Albay in the Philippines.

The diocese was erected in 1951, carved from territory of the Archdiocese of Cáceres, to which it is a suffragan. In 1974, the diocese was partitioned to form the Diocese of Virac.

Most Rev. Joel Baylon, D.D. is the current bishop of Legazpi, after serving as Bishop of Masbate. Prior to his appointment, Auxiliary Bishop of Legazpi Lucilo Quiambao had been the apostolic administrator of the diocese since Bishop Nestor Cariño's retirement in 2007. Baylon is assisted by his vicars-general, Ramón Tronqued, PC VG and Crispin Bernarte, VG.

== Coat of arms ==
The Mayon Volcano which towers over the city of Legazpi occupies the center of the shield. The papal cross surmounted by the nimbed dove symbolizes Saint Gregory the Great, the titular of the cathedral. The dove is an allusion to the testimony of Peter the Deacon who said that he oftentimes saw the Holy Ghost in the form of a dove hover above the saint while he dictated his works. The rose symbolizes Our Lady of Peñafrancia to whom all Bicolanos have a great devotion. The lily at the base represents the Immaculate Conception, the patroness of the principal church of Virac, Catanduanes in Catanduanes which belongs to the diocese (until 1974).

== Bishops ==
=== Ordinaries ===
| # | Picture | Name | From | Until | Coat of arms |
|---|---|---|---|---|---|
| 1 | | Flaviano Barrechea Ariola | May 15, 1952 appointed | November 27, 1968 resigned | |
| 2 | | Teotimo Cruel Pacis, C.M. | May 23, 1969 appointed | June 4, 1980 resigned | |
| 3 | | Concordio Maria Sarte | August 12, 1980 appointed | November 22, 1991 died | |
| 4 | | José Crisologo Sorra | March 1, 1993 appointed | April 1, 2005 retired | |
| 5 | | Nestor Celestial Cariño | April 1, 2005 appointed | November 7, 2007 resigned | |
| Sede vacante - apostolic administrator | | Lucilo Barrameda Quiambao | November 7, 2007 | October 1, 2009 | |
| 6 | | Joel Zamudio Baylon | October 1, 2009 appointed | present | |

=== Auxiliary bishops ===
| # | Picture | Name | From | Until | Coat of arms |
|---|---|---|---|---|---|
| 1 | | Nestor Celestial Cariño | 1978 | 1980 (appointed bishop of Borongan) | |
| 2 | | Lucilo Barrameda Quiambao | 1982 | 2009 | |

=== Other priests of this diocese who became bishop ===
- José Crisologo Sorra, appointed bishop of Virac in 1974; later returned here as bishop
- Joel Zamudio Baylon, appointed bishop of Masbate in 1998; later returned here as bishop

== See also ==
- Catholic Church in the Philippines
