= Legazpi Cathedral =

Roman Catholic church in Albay, Philippines

- Saint Gregory the Great Cathedral Parish
- Parokyang Katedral ni San Gregorio Magno (Filipino); Parroquia Catedral de San Gregorio Magno (Spanish)
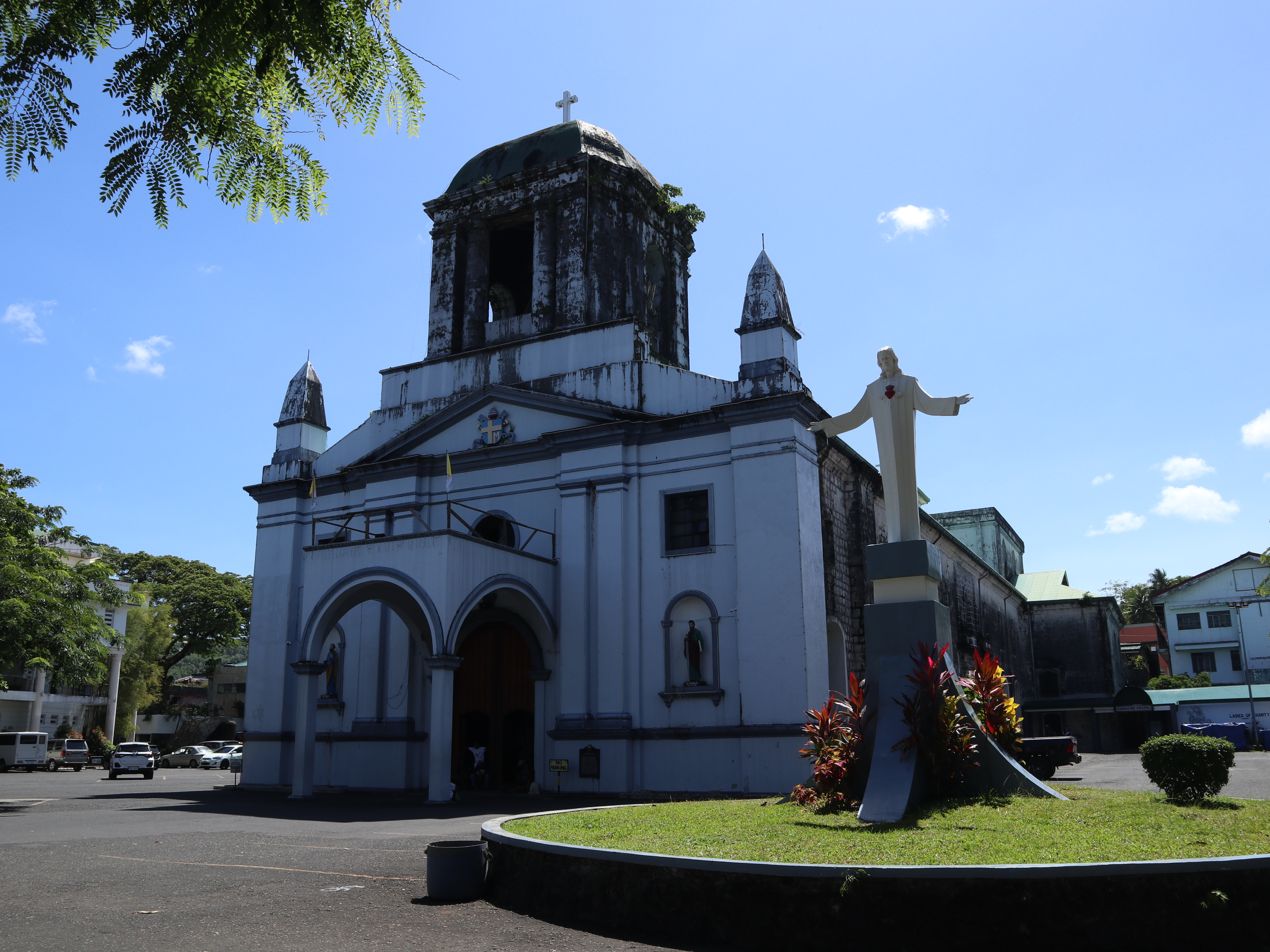
- The cathedral in April 2024

- Location in Albay Location in Luzon Location in the Philippines
- 13°08′18″N 123°43′59″E
- Location: Legazpi, Albay
- Country: Philippines
- Denomination: Roman Catholic

History
- Status: Cathedral
- Founded: 1587
- Dedication: Saint Gregory the Great

Architecture
- Functional status: Active
- Architectural type: Church building
- Style: Baroque
- Groundbreaking: 1834
- Completed: 1616, 1635, 1839, 1945
- Demolished: 1754, 1900

Administration
- Province: Province of Albay
- Archdiocese: Archdiocese of Caceres
- Diocese: Legazpi

Clergy
- Bishop: Joel Zamudio Baylon
- Rector: Rev. Fr. Lyndon F. Balubar

Saint Gregory the Great Cathedral Parish, commonly known as Legazpi Cathedral and locally as Albay Cathedral, is a Roman Catholic cathedral dedicated to Saint Gregory the Great in the Old Albay District of the city of Legazpi, Albay, in the Bicol region of the Philippines. It is the seat of the Diocese of Legazpi. In 2018, a historical marker of the National Historical Commission of the Philippines was unveiled at the cathedral.

== History ==
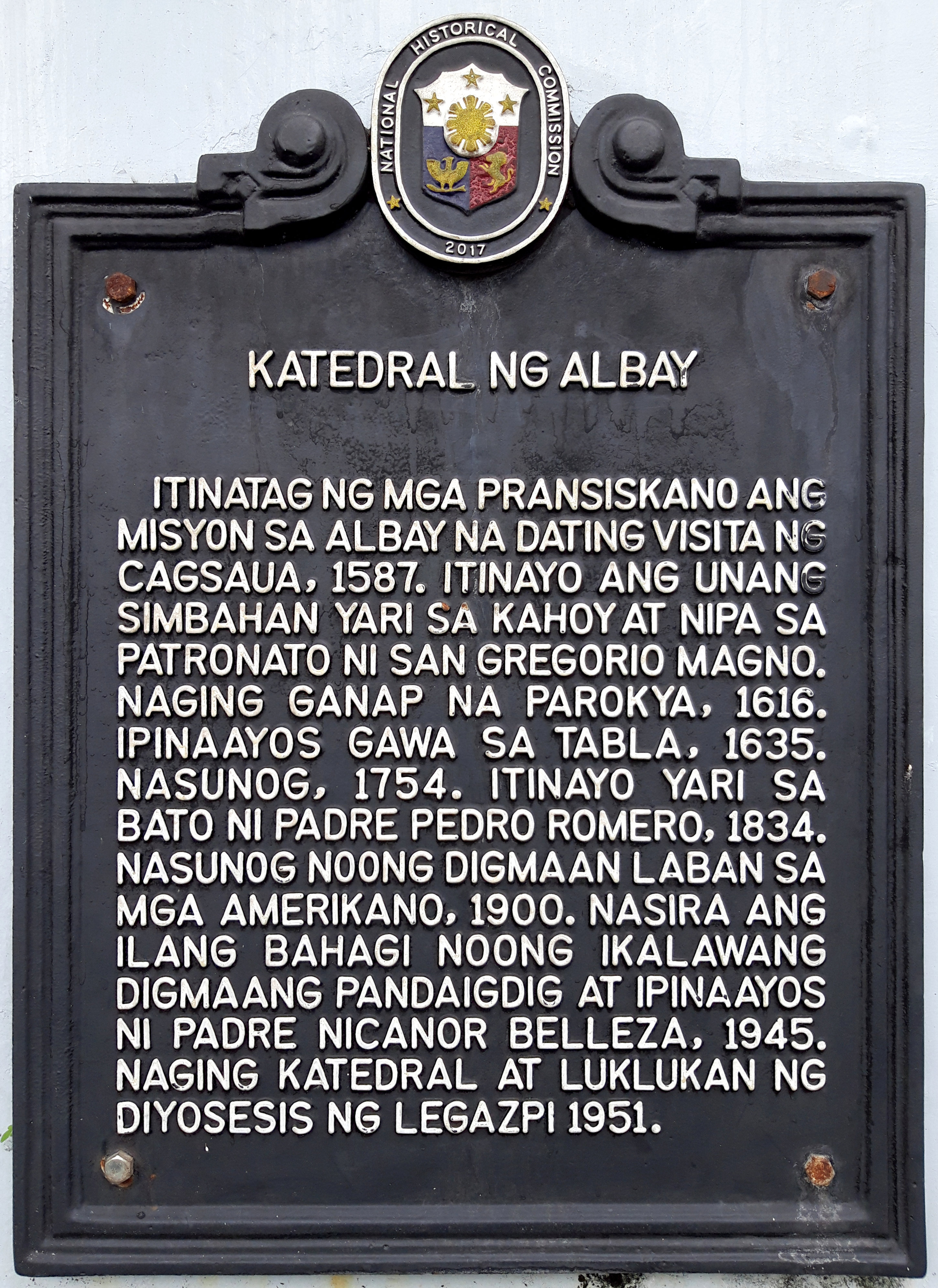
Church NHCP historical marker installed in 2017

The city of Legazpi today was initially a barangay called Sawangan, which at present corresponds to the location of the Legazpi Port. The mission in the area, the Mission de San Gregorio Magno de Sawangan, was founded by the Franciscans in 1587 as a visita of Cagsaua. Its first church of nipa and lumber was constructed which was placed under the patronage of Saint Gregory the Great, the pope of the Catholic Church from 590 to 604 CE. In 1616, it became a full pledged parish and was called Albay. It was reconstructed with wood planks in 1635 which was razed by fire in 1754. The first stone church was built under Fr. Pedro Romero in 1834 which was charred again during the Philippine-American War in 1900. In 1945, parts of the church were damaged during World War II, and was subsequently repaired under Fr. Nicanor Belleza. In 1951, it became the seat and cathedral of the Legazpi Diocese upon its foundation from the territories of the Diocese of Nueva Caceres.

== Gallery ==
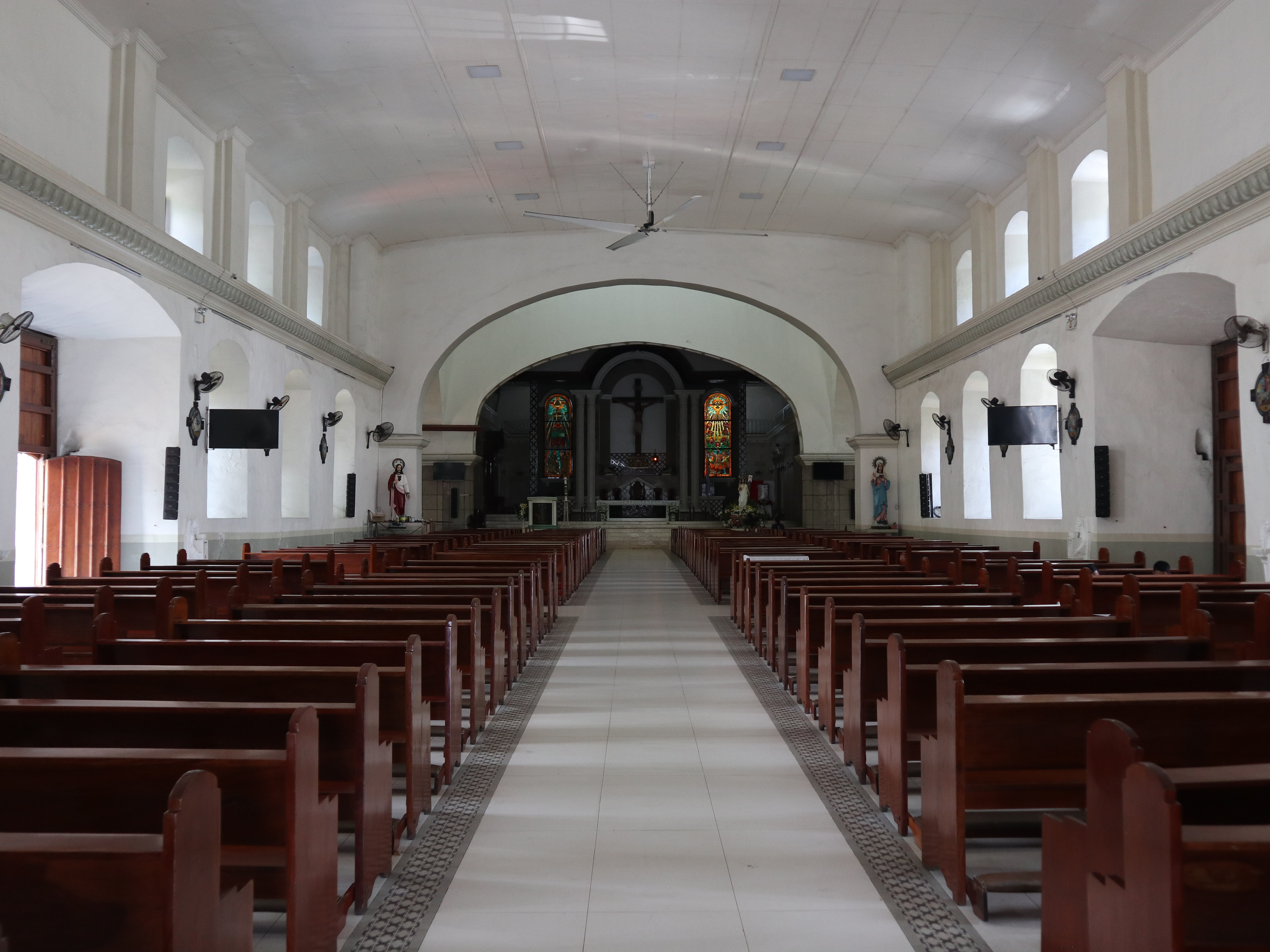
Church interior in 2023

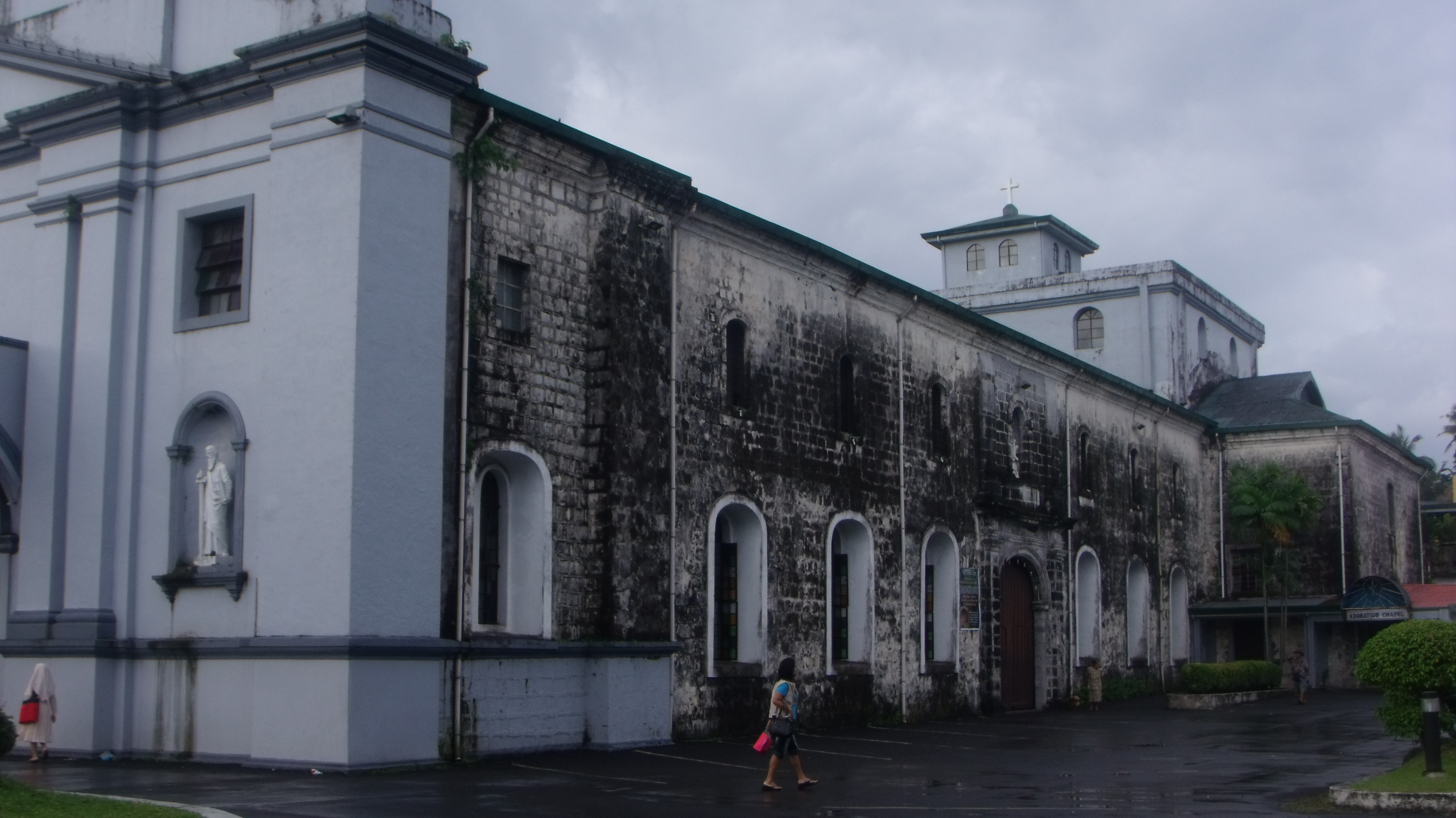
Side entrances of the cathedral

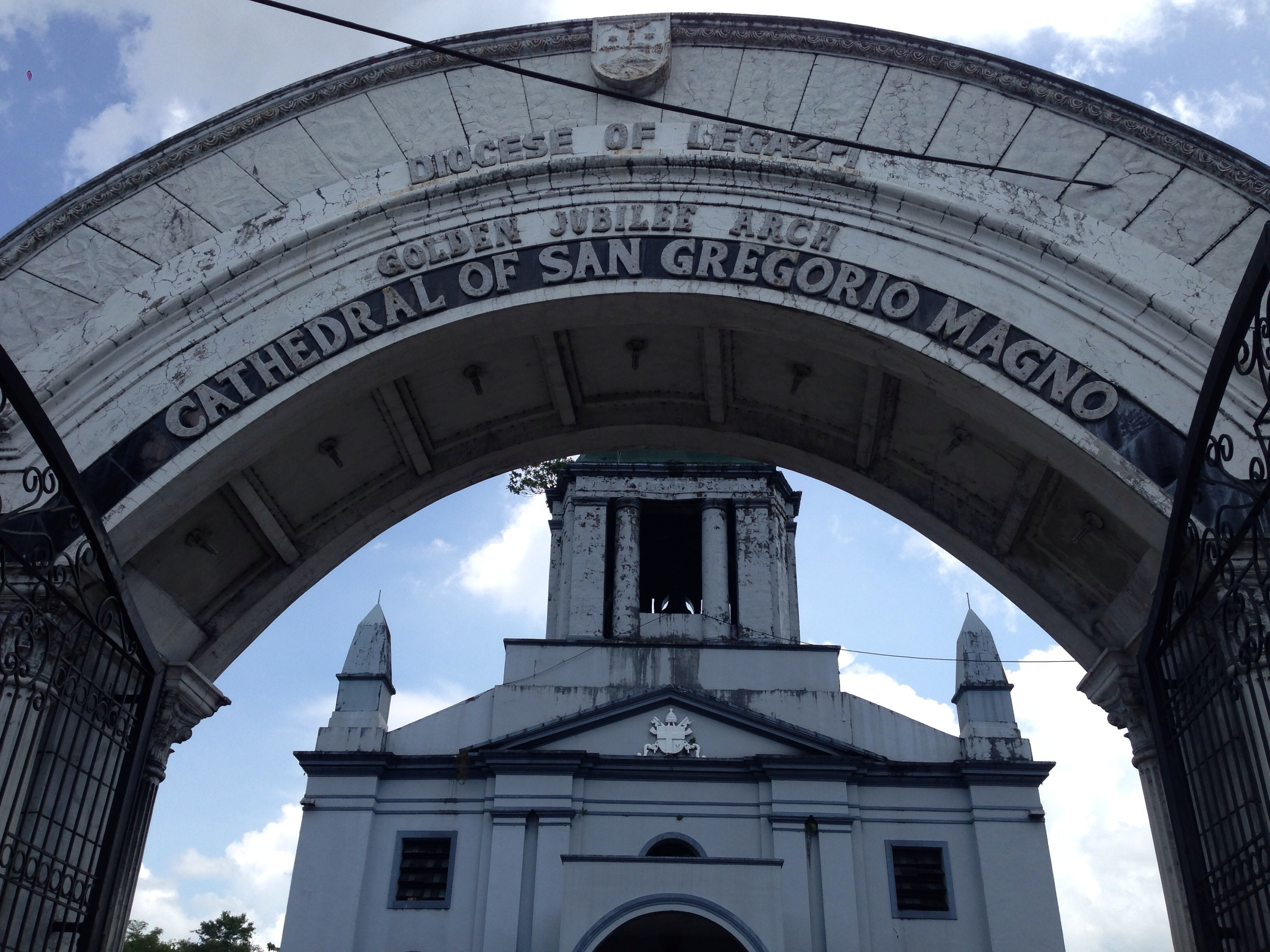
Archway at the cathedral's vicinity

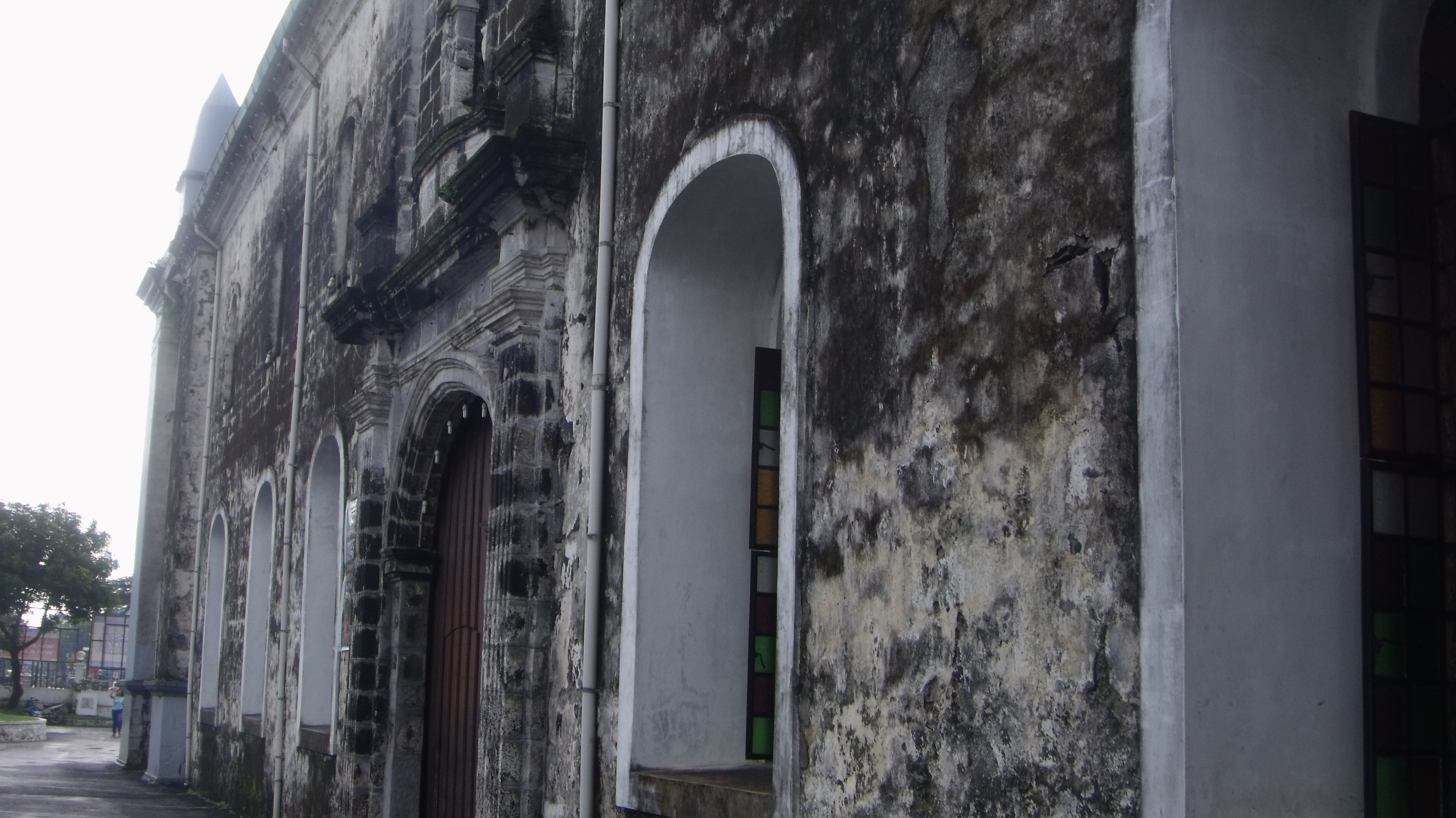
The cathedral's lateral wall details
