= List of journalists killed in the Philippines =

This is a list of journalists killed in the Philippines, sorted by date of death.

== Definitions ==
The term "media killing" has various definitions:

- The National Union of Journalists of the Philippines (NUJP) considers all media killings as work-related unless there is proof otherwise.
- The Center for Media Freedom and Responsibility (CMFR) defines media killings as "the murder of journalists and media workers," encompassing anyone who works regularly in certain media and its aspects regardless of work quality or status, with clarification on categorizing as work-related the cases of targeted killings due to their reports. The case is classified as "in the line of duty" regardless of reported abuses in the practice being provoked the killing. Meanwhile, while CMFR acknowledges a case that may be not work-related, it finds no evidence to indicate such motives until it is verified, delisting the case.
- The Committee to Protect Journalists (CPJ) records journalist killings if there are reasonable grounds to believe these are work-related.
- For Task Force Usig, a journalist's murder must be "work-related" to be considered a media killing.
- The Presidential Task Force on Media Security (PTFOMS) focuses on the case depending on the definition of "media members" or those considered as workers, which excludes guests invited by media entities; initially presumes all reported killings of such personnel as work-related and takes initiative in the investigation as a matter of protocol.

In the case of the 32 journalists slain in Maguindanao in 2009, they are reported to have been killed in the line of duty, as recorded by both CMFR and NUJP. This contradicts the claims made by TF Usig, which considers the incident to be election-related. The journalists were not the intended targets of the killers and are categorized as "collateral damage." Additionally, media activists have expressed concerns about the task force's counts since 2001, as they have documented only a small percentage compared to the tallies from CMFR and NUJP.

== Background ==
=== Statistics ===
==== Journalism-related indices ====
Despite the Philippines having one of the most liberal media environments in Asian countries, Reporters Without Borders (RSF) has said that it is the deadliest for journalists in the Asia–Pacific. Violence against journalists continued even with the establishment of the Presidential Task Force on Media Security (PTFoMS) in 2016. In its press freedom index for 2022, the country ranks 147th out of the 180 countries evaluated by RSF.

The 2009 Maguindanao massacre caused the country to be ranked 156th by RSF in 2010, 3rd in the Global Impunity Index (GII) from then until 2014, which was the country's worst ranking, and also lead to the country being listed as the world's deadliest for journalists in that year by the Committee to Protect Journalists (CPJ). The country had been on its list of the twenty deadliest from 2007 until being excluded in 2015. In 2018, the country was given a special citation as one of those with an improved ranking. Likewise, the country was reported by the RSF as one of the five deadliest countries for journalists in the world from the mid-2010s until being delisted in 2018. One of the causes is the PTFoMS' immediate action on various cases of killings and threats against the press.

The country, along with five others, has been in the GII since its launch by CPJ in 2008. The index measures deliberate, work-related killings of journalists, beginning from ten years prior. In the 2023 list, the country ranks 8th in terms of impunity in the killings, moving down from 7th in 2019–2022, and 4th in 2015.

==== Tallies ====
Based on the data by the National Union of Journalists of the Philippines (NUJP), 199 (Note: (As of November 5, 2023) NUJP still includes in their list of those killed since 1986, especially as one of the 17 during the Aquino administration, the case of Florante de Castro despite the fact that he was killed in 1984, as reported by CMFR. Considering this, the November 2023 death of Juan Jumalon should be counted by the NUJP as 198th and not 199th.) media workers have been killed since 1986; all deaths included were in relation to their job. The highest number was under the administration of President Gloria Macapagal Arroyo with 103, including 32 of those murdered in Maguindanao in what was called the world's worst single attack on journalists, which made the year 2009 the deadliest for them.

Other groups also report similarly high numbers. Data from the CPJ shows 159 killed since 1992; UNESCO reported 117 since 1996, with the majority of them having the state's publicized responses to Director General's request for information on judicial follow-up. Both include the most recent killing, the death of Juan Jumalon in November 2023.

Prior to Jumalon's death, PTFoMS reported that there were 142 work-related killings, also since 1986.

RSF, on the other hand, has an estimate of directly work-related killings that is a little less than the estimate of the NUJP.

Journalists and media workers killed
Presidency	Number		
Presidency	NUJP	CMFR, PCIJ	Bulatlat (PMPF, et al.)
Marcos Sr. (Note: Aside from official statistics, reports from various sources differ: Citing an interview with a National Press Club (NPC) official in January 1989, there were about 35 reported cases during the Marcos administration.; As reported in 1985 by The Washington Post: In a published open letter to President Ferdinand Marcos in 1985, the NPC noted 22 cases since 1979 (by August 1985); ten in the past two months. Many of these were perpetrated by either soldiers or paramilitary units. Only five were said to have been solved, few suspects had been arrested, and one conviction reported.; As reported in 1985 by Associated Press: NPC tallied six cases between 1975 and mid-1984. Since then, the military reported 13 such cases and a disappearance of the police reporter (by August 1985); seven of those deaths were possibly work-related; at least 3 were reportedly killed by the military although it is listed as suspect in several other cases, citing news reports; at least one, claimed to be a leftist rebel, reportedly killed in an encounter. The Tri-Media Association in Manila lists two others.)	n/a	n/a	32 (since 1972)
C. Aquino	17	21	34
Ramos	15	11	19
Estrada	5	6	5
Arroyo	103	80	14 (until 2003)
B. Aquino III	32	31	—
Duterte	23	—	—
Marcos Jr. (as of Nov. 2023)	4	—	—
NOTES: Figure varies.; National Union of Journalists of the Philippines (NUJP) and Center for Media Freedom and Responsibility (CMFR): tallies since C. Aquino administration began in 1986.; A 2013 report from Philippine Center for Investigative Journalism (PCIJ) cited data from CMFR.; Philippine Movement for Press Freedom (PMPF): tally since President Ferdinand Marcos declared martial law in 1972. Until 1999, 87 journalists were reportedly slain. PMPF, defunct by the mid-2000s, was a media watchdog which monitored press freedom violations especially in the 1980s; also active during the administrations of C. Aquino and Ramos.; Reports from Bulatlat in 2003 cited figures compiled by PMPF and by the Media for Peace through the CMFR and NUJP. However, their tally differs from CMFR alone, for instance, the case of Nelson Nadura was counted by Bulatlat as 72nd, by CMFR as 43rd, both since 1986.; Through a published letter in the Philippine Daily Inquirer in 2014, CMFR explained that in researching each case, they exclude those found to be non-work-related, making its count lower than that of NUJP.; CMFR announced it will cease operations on September 30, 2026, citing funding difficulties.

Most deaths, according to NUJP and the Philippine Center for Investigative Journalism (PCIJ), were radio personalities, especially blocktime commentators, many affiliated to local politicians as suggested by a research from CPJ, and as reported by PCIJ, had minimal awareness of journalistic ethics or libel laws. Most incidents occurred in Mindanao, according to PTFoMS.

Various data show similarities seen in most of the killings. Incidents usually occurred in the provinces, wherein victims working there as journalists exposed wrongdoings in their locality and were critical about these issues. For instance, a CPJ's database shows that among those journalists killed in 1992–July 2021, it was found that 94% were based in the provinces; a third of them had received prior threats. On the other hand, suspects, unknown and presumably hired killers, were hardly caught; very often they are motorcycle-riding assailants.

Both CMFR and the Philippine National Police reported in 2005 that of the journalists slain in the line or duty, seven were killed in crossfire: five during encounter with or being killed by the New People's Army (including two in an ambush in 1986), and two during a coup attempt in 1989 perpetrated by RAM–SFP–YOU.

The Center for Media Freedom and Responsibility (CMFR) has recorded, by April 2015, ten of those "killed in the line of duty since 1986" are women, four of them in the 2009 Maguindanao massacre case. Excluding more than a hundred arrested in connection with the 2009 murders, four alleged gunmen in two of the six cases were arrested; one of them has been released.

Data shows that few cases of media killings since the 1986 People Power Revolution have had developments. Combined data from CMFR (Nov. 2014) and PTFoMS (Jan. 2020) show that at least 53 of the cases resulted in convictions; the CMFR also reported, by Apr. 2016, six acquittals. (Note: Trial status: CMFR reported (by Nov. 2014): —Fourteen with conviction: Joaquin, 1987; Toling, 1991; Berbon, 1996; Mallari, 1998 (archived for other suspects); Palma, 1999; Ureta, 2001 (accomplice convicted of homicide, gunman cleared due to being dead); Damalerio, 2002; Endrinal, 2004; Esperat (case against masterminds archived), Cantoneros & Benaojan, 2005; Pace, 2006; Padrigao, 2008 (conviction for a suspect pled guilty to homicide; ongoing trial for another); Ortega, 2011 (ongoing trial for masterminds). —Four with acquittal: Binoya & Mariano, 2004; Batul, 2006; Lintuan, 2007. —Eight dismissed at the Regional Trial Court (RTC) level: Manrique, 1988; Cayona & Ramos, 2001; Villarante, 2003; Manalo, 2004 (at the trial court and Ombudsman; accused gunman killed); Agustin, 2005 (case against alleged mastermind dismissed; archived for other suspects); Canete, 2006; Sison, 2008 (insufficient evidence against suspects). PTFoMS, in their inventory of cases, had obtained eighteen cases with convictions, as well as two (Loreto–Kho case, 2013) with a suspect pleaded guilty, with some discovered especially the unreported ones, prior to the 2019 verdict on the deaths of 31 of 32 journalists in Maguindanao in 2009 (the case of Momay was dismissed by the court and is for reinvestigation), thus reporting 49 overall: —Fifteen work-related: Lingan (1990), Toling (1991), Palma (1999), Ureta (2001), Demalerio (2002), Endrinal & Hinolan (2004), Esperat & Benaojan (2005), Pace (2006), Roxas & Padrigao (2008), Camangyan & Belen (2010), Ortega (2011). —Three non-work-related: Hernandez (1997), Orsolino (2006), Daguio.) Meanwhile, CMFR recorded that, by 2011, 54% of the monitored cases were considered "cold or dead," where police have been unable to identify and arrest any suspect. Furthermore, both PCIJ (in a February 2015 report) and CMFR stated that none of the masterminds have been prosecuted and convicted. The CPJ shows in its database that assailants in 97% of the recorded killings (1992–July 2021) have not yet been punished; local government officials were suspected as the masterminds in more than half of the cases.

PTFoMS, created through Administrative Order No. 1 issued by President Rodrigo Duterte in October 2016, has been acting on the later cases; also, it has been gathering all data from various sources to map prior cases in the country and to exercise investigative powers on them; the results (shown at the table) until the 2019 verdict on the Ampatuan massacre case are recorded.

Cases recorded by PTFoMS (since 1986, as of Jan. 2020)
Description			No.
Killing (180)	Work-related (22)	Under investigation (including those cases with unidentified suspects, unavailable witnesses or evidence)	5
Killing (180)	Work-related (22)	Ongoing trial	17
Killing (180)	Not-work related		56
Killing (180)	Closed cases (102)	Reached conviction (including the Ampatuan massacre case) (Note: Only 31 of 32 cases. That of victim Reynaldo Momay is for reinvestigation after it was dismissed.)	49
Killing (180)	Closed cases (102)	Deemed prescribed and with unavailable records	26
Killing (180)	Closed cases (102)	Suspects died	8
Killing (180)	Closed cases (102)	Victim's family is no longer interested to file a complaint or pursue the case	8
Killing (180)	Closed cases (102)	Reached acquittal	5
Killing (180)	Closed cases (102)	Dismissed	6
Not killing (64)	Threats		58
Not killing (64)	Survivors of physical attacks with the intention to kill		6
Cases involving journalists and media workers			244
Source: Presidential Task Force on Media Security

For those cases prior to 1986, various sources document such. According to the National Press Club (NPC), about 35 journalists were killed during the Marcos administration. NPC, as well as the military and a journalists' group in Manila, both reported more cases from mid-1984 to mid-1985, more than twice than the previous decade. Either military personnel or paramilitary units were the perpetrators in several cases. Few of these were said to be solved, few suspects were arrested, and at least a conviction was reported.

In 2006, President Gloria Macapagal Arroyo created Task Force Usig in response to the rising number of murders of journalists and activists. While the supervisory body reportedly accomplished police reform and increased coordination, among other accomplishments, it was criticized by media activists for failure to provide necessary logistics. Additionally, it was deemed ineffective as it operated from Camp Crame and relied on local police investigators vulnerable to political pressure.

== Pre-1980s ==
- Antonio Abad Tormis, Republic News editor and columnist, was shot on July 3, 1961, in front of the Masonic Temple building in Cebu City. Felipe Pareja, city treasurer at that time, had been the subject of Tormis' commentaries on graft. Pareja, the mastermind, and the gunman, Cesario Orongan, were convicted and imprisoned. This is the only such case in Cebu considered work-related.
- Ermin Garcia Sr., editor of the Dagupan Sunday Punch newspaper, was shot dead in his office by two hitmen in Dagupan, Pangasinan on 20 May 1966. The next edition of the Sunday Punch revealed that Garcia was working on exposing the illegal practices of some local politicians at the time, and that the killing was most likely related.
- Celso Tan, DYRL commentator, was shot dead in May 1967 in his home in Bacolod. He had been exposing in his program a criminal syndicate, which was later believed to be behind the killing. This is the first such killing in the city and in Negros Occidental.

== 1980s ==
=== Pre-1986 ===
- Demosthenes "Demy" Dingcong, Lanao provincial correspondent of Bulletin Today, was shot by an unidentified gunman in his house in Iligan, Lanao del Norte on December 5, 1980. He had written exposés about anomalies in the local government activities, including that on the missing fund intended for the students of Mindanao State University; also on military abuses, and the situation of the political prisoners in the province. He had already received threats from local officials.
- Geoffrey Siao, radio commentator and writer of the Philippine Post in Iligan, was murdered on March 2, 1984.
- Florante "Boy" de Castro, lawyer and news commentator worked at DXCP, who had reported suspicious local government activities in South Cotabato, was gunned down on March 9, 1984, inside his house in General Santos. (Note: Florante de Castro had been listed in media organizations' databases, including CMFR which, in 2006, discovered that de Castro was killed on March 9, 1984, and not 1986, citing a 1984 issue of Malaya newspaper. Thus, de Castro was excluded then by CMFR from its official list of those killed in the line of duty since 1986. Despite such fact, NUJP still includes de Castro in their list and remains until the present tally.)
- Vicente (Vic) Villordon, DYLA anchor, a critic of both the Marcos government and the communist movement, was shot by two gunmen on December 28, 1984, outside the station in Cebu City. The case has been unsolved. In a 2006 report by The Philippine Star, a former communist rebel claimed Villordon and Leo Enriquez III (killed in 1987), his former colleagues in the Communist Party of the Philippines–New People's Army (CPP–NPA), were killed by their comrades.
- Charles (or Charlie) Aberilla, DXWG (Iligan) commentator, on April 29, 1985, was killed by three armed men who had entered the announcer's booth while on-air.
- Nabokodonosor "Nabing" Velez, 47, DYLA anchor-commentator in Cebu, was attacked by six gunmen on June 1, 1985, while watching a beauty contest. Case is unsolved.
- Joselito Paloma, provincial journalist and publisher in Surigao, was fatally shot in his car on August 19, 1985.
- Eddie Suede, died 1985.
- Edgar Nagar of DXDC, Davao City.
- Gorge Batoctoy of defunct National Media Production Center, Davao City.
- Alexander Orcullo, worked for a newspaper in Davao, was gunned down.
- Noe Alejandrino of Bulacan, was claimed by the military as a Communist rebel leader who was killed after engaging soldiers in a firefight.

=== 1986 ===
Name	Profile	Date	Place	Notes	Sources	Refs
Pete Mabazza (Note: In its 2005 report, Reporters Without Borders listed 42 cases whose actions of the police are said had been not good enough: 1986: Mabazza, Vicoy; 1987: Joaquin, Palo, Balani, Sagado; 1988: Miranda, Manrigue, Nava; 1989: Arcones, Talan; 1990: Catinding, Ladrigan; 1991: Toling; 1992: Hapalla, Martin, Vergara; 1993: Legaspi; 1996: Reyes; 1997: Mabazza; 1998: Bancarin, Bentulan; 2000: Yu, Jalapit; 2001: Yusop, Ureta, Cayona, Ramos; 2002: Hernandez, Damalerio (decided 2005), Alcantara; 2003: Villanueva, Pobeda, Gregorio, Villarante, Ramirez, Pala, Nadura; 2004: Endrinal, Mariano, Lumawag; 2005: Amoro)	Local correspondent for Manila Bulletin	Apr 24	Gattaran, Cagayan	Mabazza and Vicoy were attacked on April 24 in Gattaran, Cagayan. Mabazza died that day and Vicoy died the following day in Tuguegarao. A convoy of army soldiers and journalists was ambushed by the NPA; eight soldiers were also killed. Mabazza and Vicoy were the first journalists killed while covering the communist insurgency.	NUJP, CMFR	
Wilfredo Vicoy	Veteran combat photographer for United Press International and Reuters	Apr 24	Gattaran, Cagayan	Mabazza and Vicoy were attacked on April 24 in Gattaran, Cagayan. Mabazza died that day and Vicoy died the following day in Tuguegarao. A convoy of army soldiers and journalists was ambushed by the NPA; eight soldiers were also killed. Mabazza and Vicoy were the first journalists killed while covering the communist insurgency.	NUJP, CMFR	

=== 1987 ===
Name	Profile	Date	Place	Notes	Sources	Refs
Virgilio Pacala	Manila Hotline magazine	Mar 24	San Pablo, Laguna	Pacala was fatally shot. The motive remains unclear.	CMFR	
Dionisio Perpetuo Joaquin	Olongapo News	Apr 12	Subic, Zambales or Olongapo	Nicomedes Fabro, Francisco Dimalanta and Amado Alcala were convicted for the killing.	NUJP, CMFR	
Manuel Sanchez	Television cameraman	Jun 9	Quezon City	Sanchez had hitched a ride with leftist politician Bernabe Buscayno after Buscayno's television appearance; he was killed when gunmen ambushed Buscayno.		
Narciso Balani	Technician-on-board, DXRA	Aug 27	Davao City	Balani, Maglalang, Palo, and Zagado were from DXRA of Rizal Memorial Colleges. Along with five civilian guests, they died when NPA gunmen attacked the radio station, then known for its anti-communist broadcasts, in the worst crime against the press in the city. Fernando "Ferdie" Lintuan survived the attack but was later assassinated in 2007.	NUJP, CMFR	
Cesar Maglalang	Assistant, DXRA	Aug 27	Davao City	Balani, Maglalang, Palo, and Zagado were from DXRA of Rizal Memorial Colleges. Along with five civilian guests, they died when NPA gunmen attacked the radio station, then known for its anti-communist broadcasts, in the worst crime against the press in the city. Fernando "Ferdie" Lintuan survived the attack but was later assassinated in 2007.	CMFR	
Leo Palo (Note: Leo Palo: Some sources also referred to as Leo Palomares and Ed Palomares with Palo erroneously reported as being killed "during the Malacañang siege.")	News commentator, DXRA	Aug 27	Davao City	Balani, Maglalang, Palo, and Zagado were from DXRA of Rizal Memorial Colleges. Along with five civilian guests, they died when NPA gunmen attacked the radio station, then known for its anti-communist broadcasts, in the worst crime against the press in the city. Fernando "Ferdie" Lintuan survived the attack but was later assassinated in 2007.	NUJP, CMFR	
Rogie Zagado	Reporter, commentator, DXRA	Aug 27	Davao City	Balani, Maglalang, Palo, and Zagado were from DXRA of Rizal Memorial Colleges. Along with five civilian guests, they died when NPA gunmen attacked the radio station, then known for its anti-communist broadcasts, in the worst crime against the press in the city. Fernando "Ferdie" Lintuan survived the attack but was later assassinated in 2007.	NUJP, CMFR	
Robert MacDonald	New Zealand freelance photographer working for Pacific Defense Reports	Aug 28	Quezon City	MacDonald was shot while covering the August 1987 Philippine coup attempt.		
Martin Castor	Pilipino Ngayon (Manila) reporter; photographer	Aug 28	Manila	Castor was shot during the August 1987 Philippine coup attempt when members of the Reform the Armed Forces Movement fired on his press van.	NUJP, CMFR	
Ramon Noblejas	DYVL (Tacloban) production manager; reporter	Oct 4	Tacloban	Noblejas was shot. He had denounced local corruption and human rights violations. The case remains unsolved.	NUJP, CMFR	
Leo Enriquez III	People's Journal correspondent; news reporter also worked in Kyodo News Service and Washington Times; local anti-communist activist	Oct 10	Mandaue	Enriquez was shot dead near his house. The case has been unsolved. The CPP–NPA were reported to be responsible; this was further claimed by a former communist rebel, former colleagues of Enriquez and Vic Villordon (killed in 1984), and in a 2006 report by The Philippine Star.	CMFR	

=== 1988 ===
Name	Profile	Date	Place	Notes	Sources	Refs
Noel Miranda	Publisher, editor, and owner of Mindanao Scanner	Mar 29	Tagum, Davao del Norte		NUJP, CMFR	
Jose Naperos			Pampanga			
Ricardo Ribano	People's Journal correspondent	Jun 22		Ribano, 26, was allegedly killed by member of anti-communist group Alsa Masa in an argument. The suspect was later released on bail.		
Oscar Apolinario	Reporter, San Francisco Times (San Francisco)	Jul 23	Surigao City	Apolinario was reportedly killed at his home by a gunman identified as a sergeant. The motive is unknown.		
Ruben Manrique	Luzon Tribune (Bataan) publisher-editor	Aug 12	Balanga, Bataan	Manrique was shot. His killing is believed to be related to his reports on local illegal gambling. The case was dismissed at the trial court.	NUJP, CMFR	
Josef Aldeguer Nava	Editor & publisher of Visayan Life Today (Iloilo); also worked in DYRP	Oct 30	Iloilo City	Nava was shot dead by unidentified assailant. He was known for his exposés of corruption and human rights abuses by the military. No leads were reported for the case.	NUJP, CMFR	
Noli Resurreccion	Laguna correspondent for Metro Manila-based Balita and DZMM	Nov 17		A local businessman was reportedly identified as a suspect in Resurreccion's killing and later charged, but he escaped arrest. The killing is believed to be connected to his exposé of local illegal gambling.		

=== 1989 ===
Name	Profile	Date	Place	Notes	Sources	Refs
Mandangan Abedin		Mar 17				
Severino Arcones	DYFM Bombo Radyo (Iloilo City) manager, commentator, and reporter	Oct 17	Iloilo City	Arcones was murdered in front of his house. Responsibility for the murder was unclear; Arcones, an anti-communist, was generally believed to be killed by the NPA because of his stance. He had also criticized local politicians in Iloilo province. Arcones was the first husband of Marlene Garcia-Esperat, who was later murdered in 2005.	NUJP, CMFR	
Cesario de Vera		Nov 23	Biñan, Laguna			
Eddie Telan	Manila-based; worked at Newscaster as publisher, editor; also worked in radio	Dec 1	Quezon City		NUJP, CMFR	

== 1990s ==
=== 1990 ===
Name	Profile	Date	Place	Notes	Sources	Refs
Benito Mercadono		Jan 4	Iligan			
Enrique Lingan	The Luzon Times, The Midway Star	Jan 4	Lucena		CMFR	
Joseph "Joe" Kreuger	Mindoro Weekly Reporter	Feb 6	Pinamalayan, Oriental Mindoro		CMFR	
Enrique Ger		Feb 7	Oriental Mindoro			
Reynaldo Catindig Sr.	Publisher, editor of Northern Sierra Madre Express (Isabela)	May 15	Tumauini, Isabela		NUJP, CMFR	
Jean Ladringan	Publisher-editor of the weekly Southern Star (General Santos)	Jul 8	General Santos	Along with her husband, Ladringan was shot dead by unidentified men in what was said to be a robbery case. An exposé published by Ladringan implicating top Muslim officials at the Mindanao State University in graft and corruption, which led to their dismissal, was seen as a possible motive.	NUJP, CMFR	
Mahaidin Abdullah	Radio show host in Cotabato City	Jul 9	Cotabato City	Abdullah was shot dead by unknown gunmen.		
Francisco "Frank" Mararac	Reporter and commentator in DWDW; staffer, Sunday Punch newspaper, Dagupan	Jul 10	Lingayen, Pangasinan	With his son, Mararac was shot dead by an unknown gunmen.		
Jaime Ramoros		Dec 25	Iligan			

=== 1991 ===
Name	Profile	Date	Place	Notes	Sources	Refs
Nesino Paulin Toling	Publisher-editor and owner of Panguil Bay Monitor (Ozamiz)	Apr 14	Ozamiz, Misamis Occidental	Toling was shot and killed. He had been exposing organized crime activities. Two suspects were arrested for the murder. Gerry Sarabia was convicted for the killing and had to serve a term of 17–20 years at the San Ramon Penal Colony.	NUJP, CMFR	
Candido Basilisco	Philippine Punch editor (Cebu)	May 1 or 5	Cebu City	His support to the workers in a local labor dispute was linked to the killing. Several arrests were made in connection with the murder; but the case was unsolved by year-end.		
Nicasio "Nick" Enciso	Reporter and columnist for dailies, Manila Bulletin and its sister publication Tempo; president of the Pambansang Katipunan ng mga Barangay and of the Federation of Provincial Press Clubs of the Philippines	May 26	Tagaytay, Cavite	Enciso, 67, was killed in an attack by two armed soldiers who had barged into his house, reportedly due to a land dispute.		

=== 1992 ===
Name	Profile	Attack/death	Notes	Sources	Refs.
Danilo Vergara	Publisher (1989–1992) & editor of the weekly Philippine Post Secretary of the Mindanao and Iligan press clubs	Jul. 1 Iligan	Vergara was shot by assailants allegedly from a criminal group; so as a security guard who tried to intervene. Case remains unsolved.	NUJP; CMFR; CPJ	
Abdulajid/Ladjid "Jade" Ladja	Correspondent for the weekly Prensa Zamboanga	July; Zamboanga City		NUJP; CMFR; CPJ	
Anwar Utto	DXMS reporter in Cotabato City	July 28			
Greg Hapalla	Commentator at DXAS (Zamboanga City) preacher	Sept. 21; Zamboanga City	Hapalla, along with a radio technician and a visitor, was shot to death by gunmen during his broadcast. Case remains unsolved.	NUJP; CMFR; CPJ	
Gloria Martin	DXXX correspondent and commentator based in Isabela, Basilan	Dec. 2 Isabela, Basilan	Martin died after being shot by two unidentified motorcycle-riding gunmen while driving home. She had received death threats as she was criticizing the government for allegedly failing to stop the kidnappings in the municipality.	NUJP; CMFR; CPJ	
Notes: That year, the Committee to Protect Journalists (CPJ) began documenting cases worldwide with 4 in the country—that of Vergara and Hapalla were confirmed as work-related; the rest were suspected. NUJP & CMFR also documented 4.

=== 1993 ===
Name	Profile	Attack/death	Notes	Sources	Refs.
Romeo A. Legaspi	Voice of Zambales publisher-columnist	Disappearance & reported death: Jan. 11; Olongapo	Legaspi was last seen alive on that day he was abducted after a conflict with law enforcement intelligence. It was suggested that he was killed. Case remains unsolved.	NUJP; CMFR; CPJ	
Alfredo M. Noblefranca	Davao Observer columnist	Apr. 3			
Elpidio Monteclaro	DZNC commentator in Isabela	June 2 or 3			
Ding Sade	Reporters for Cotabato News (Cotabato Ngayon in another source.)	Nov. 22; Cotabato City	Sade and Lao were shot dead. No motive had been established.	NUJP; CPJ	
Rosauro Lao	Reporters for Cotabato News (Cotabato Ngayon in another source.)	Nov. 22; Cotabato City	Sade and Lao were shot dead. No motive had been established.	NUJP; CPJ	
Note: NUJP & CPJ documented 3 cases, with that of Legaspi confirmed by CPJ as work-related and the rest suspected; CMFR, 1.

=== 1995 ===
Name	Profile	Attack/death	Notes	Refs.
Ambrosio Iyas	DYLA blocktimer	Apr. 14; Lapu-Lapu, Cebu	Iyas, 63, was shot at his home. He was said to be the campaign manager of the city's vice mayor who was running for mayor in the 1995 Philippine general election. The case remains unsolved.	
Geronimo "Boy" Creer	Broadcaster; former sports columnist for The Freeman Lawyer	May 11; Cebu City	Creer and his lover were stabbed to death near a street corner. Charges against Jecknel Inso, who had spent five years in jail as a suspect, were dismissed upon prosecution's failure to present witnesses. The case remains unsolved.	
Note: No cases were included in any of the tallies.

=== 1996 ===
Name	Profile	Attack/death	Notes	Sources	Refs.
Ferdinand Reyes	Publisher & editor-in-chief of the weekly Press Freedom (Dipolog) human rights lawyer	Feb. 12; Dipolog, Zamboanga del Norte	Reyes was shot to death by an assassin in his office. A soldier, contracted by military officials, was suspected; as Reyes had received threats for being critical of the government, particularly the army on alleged abuses of their power. Case remains unsolved.	NUJP; CMFR; CPJ	
Jose Tiongson	Reporter of the Ilocos Observer	Mar. 31; Tayug, Pangasinan	Tiongson was killed by a jeepney driver in an altercation; suspect remains at large. The motive is unclear.		
Junel Desonia	Cotabato-based reporter of the Mindanao Bulletin tabloid (General Santos)	May 4	Desonia, 23, was fatally shot allegedly by a security guard while entering a disco house.		
Alberto Berbon	Senior editor (deskman) for ABS-CBN–DZMM (Metro Manila) Head of a local journalists association; anti-crime activist	Dec. 15; Imus, Cavite	In early 1997, charges were filed against four suspects. Jose Espinelli, reportedly the killer, was convicted.	NUJP; CMFR; CPJ	
Note: NUJP, CMFR & CPJ documented two cases; with that of Reyes confirmed by CPJ as work-related and that of Berbon suspected.

=== 1997 ===
Name	Profile	Attack/death	Notes	Sources	Refs.
Daniel "Danny" Hernandez	News editor and columnist at People's Journal Tonight (Metro Manila)	June 3 Quezon City	Hernandez was shot dead while riding a taxi. He was known for being a critic of crimes and corruption.	NUJP; CMFR; CPJ	
Evelyn Joy Militante	GMA Channel 12 (Legazpi)	August; Legazpi, Albay		NUJP	
Regalado Mabazza	Polaris Cable Network (Cauayan, Isabela) as announcer	Dec. 17; Cauayan, Isabela		NUJP; CMFR	
Note: NUJP documented all 3 cases; CMFR, 2; CPJ, 1.

=== 1998 ===
Name	Profile	Date	Place	Notes	Sources	Refs
Odilon Mallari	DXCP (General Santos) reporter and commentator; lawyer	Feb 15	General Santos	Mallari was shot and killed. Elias Bravo and Lucio Beating, suspected NPA Sparrow hitmen, were convicted for the killing. The case was archived for other suspects.	NUJP, CMFR	
Rey/Reynaldo Bancairin	DXLL (Zamboanga City) commentator	Mar 29	Zamboanga City	Bancairin was gunned down while broadcasting in the radio booth. Abdulwarid Ada was accused. Candelario Cayona, another journalist from the same station, was murdered in 2001; Ada was also involved.	NUJP, CMFR, CPJ	
Nelson Catipay	DXMY (Cotabato City) correspondent	Apr 16	Sultan Kudarat	Catipay was shot and killed.	NUJP, CPJ	
Danny Llasos	Volunteer-reporter for Radio Mindanao Network (RMN)–DYHB Radyo Agong (Bacolod)	May 13	Bacolod	Llasos was shot dead in a betting station by unidentified motorcycle-riding men. This was said to be not work-related, and the killers have not been arrested. In 2004, the Criminal Investigation and Detection Group (CIDG) reopened its investigation on the case.		
Dominador "Dom" Bentulan	DXGS (General Santos)	Oct 30	General Santos or Digos		NUJP, CMFR	

=== 1999 ===
Name	Profile	Date	Place	Notes	Sources	Refs
Bienvenido Dasal	DXKR Radyo Agong	Jan 21	Koronadal, South Cotabato		CMFR	
Frank Palma	DYWB Bombo Radyo (Bacolod) senior reporter; pastor	Apr 25	Bacolod	Palma was murdered near his home. Gerardo Tocana, said to be the killer, was sentenced to life imprisonment for the killing in one of the first convictions among other cases since 1986.	NUJP, CMFR	
Elmer Duque	PTV-4 cameraman	Jul 28	Quezon City	Duque's killing was not work-related. He was shot by a group of men in a robbery spree in Caloocan and Quezon City, which killed six. All eight suspects were later convicted of robbery with homicide.		

=== Unknown date ===
- In the early 1990s, Pedro "Pete" Dahan, a DXUM block-timer announcer, was shot dead in Davao City. The killing was linked to various aspects other than him being a journalist.

== 2000s ==
=== 2000 ===
Name	Profile	Date	Place	Notes	Sources	Refs
William Yap Yu	Publisher of local Pagadian City Star	May	Pagadian, Zamboanga del Sur	Yu was reportedly shot dead. No arrests were made, though the assassin was described by witnesses. The case remains unsolved.		
Vincent Rodriguez	DZMM correspondent (Pampanga-based)	May 23	Guagua, Pampanga	Rodriguez was murdered while on assignment covering the visit of a son of President Joseph Estrada. On June 4, 2001, three accused in the killing, all members of the NPA splinter group Rebolusyonaryong Hukbong Bayan, were arrested in Pampanga. A case was filed.	NUJP, CMFR, CPJ	
Olimpio Jalapit Jr.	RMN–DXPR as commentator	Nov 17	Pagadian, Zamboanga del Sur	Jalapit was murdered. A former military officer accused of the killing remained at large; RSF was uncertain if the case was work-related.	NUJP, CMFR, CPJ	

=== 2001 ===
For 2001, RSF reported two cases as work-related: Rolando Ureta and Candelario "Jhun" Cayona Jr. RSF said that by year-end, the killings of two other journalists could not be established if work-related. (Note: Some sources erroneously included the case of Noli Ebarle (Noel Esin), Butuan-based radio broadcaster abducted by a criminal syndicate on Aug 31 (mistakenly recorded as date of death) and released on Sept. 3. The RSF, at least, reported the same in its annual report.)

Name	Profile	Date	Place	Notes	Sources	Refs
Rolando Ureta	Program director and commentator for RMN–DYKR Kalibo, Aklan; formerly worked for IBC–DYIG and for Panay News; former member of municipal council	Jan 3	Lezo, Aklan	Ureta was killed by gunmen on motorcycles while on his way home from his evening broadcast. Ureta had tackled issues on illegal gambling and illegal drugs in Aklan, and reportedly received death threats within the past five months due to his commentaries. Murder charges against four suspects were filed in 2004 but dismissed by the provincial prosecutor's office, which rejected the lone witness' testimony. In 2007, the Department of Justice reversed the dismissal of two of the suspects, who then filed a motion asking for the retention of the case's dismissal. In 2008, the Supreme Court granted a petition by the Freedom Fund for Filipino Journalists (FFFJ) and the NUJP to transfer the venue of the cases of Ureta and of Herson Hinolan from Aklan to Cebu; both cases were raffled to the Cebu City Regional Trial Court. An accomplice was convicted of homicide; the gunman, being dead, was cleared.	NUJP, CMFR, CPJ	
Mohammad Yusop	Commentator of DXID of the Islamic Radio Broadcasting network (Pagadian)	Feb 24	Pagadian, Zamboanga del Sur	While on his way home on his motorcycle, Yusop was reportedly shot and killed by two unidentified individuals. Police had no leads in the case. He had hosted a religious program and was not known to have broadcast any controversial reports. The station manager said that he was not aware of any threats against Yusop. The case underwent investigation.	NUJP, CMFR, CPJ	
Candelario "Jhun" Cayona Jr.	Presenter on DXLL Radyo Ukay (UMBN; Zamboanga City) and print journalist	May 30	Zamboanga City	Cayona was murdered by two unidentified gunmen on the way to the radio's offices. At the time, he was investigating drug trafficking in the region. He had received death threats as he carried out several interviews with leaders of the rebel group Abu Sayyaf especially during the Jolo hostage crisis, which angered the authorities, especially the Philippine Army. On May 28, 2002, the main suspect, hired killer Abduwarid Adda, was arrested in the same city. Adda was said to be involved in the 1998 murder of another journalist from the same station, Reynaldo Bancayrin. The case was dismissed at the trial court.	NUJP, CMFR, CPJ	
Joy Mortel	Mindoro Guardian reporter	May 30	Occidental Mindoro	Mortel was shot and killed by two armed people who had entered her home. Being an administrator of agricultural cooperatives, she was accused of corruption and became a target of Communist rebels. Although the motive for her murder remains unclear, police did not exclude the possibility that this was work-related.	NUJP, CPJ	
Dennis Ramos	Boses tabloid	Aug 24	Bacoor, Cavite	The case was dismissed in court.	CMFR	

=== 2002 ===
Name	Profile	Date	Place	Notes	Sources	Refs
Benjaline "Beng" Hernandez	Vice president of the College Editors Guild of the Philippines for Mindanao; editor of Ateneo de Davao student newspaper Atenews; researcher for the human rights organization Karapatan in Davao City	Apr 5	Arakan, Cotabato	Hernandez, 22, and her three companions were shot reportedly by a group of army troopers and paramilitary men while conducting a research in the area for the organization and for local newspapers. In August, a complaint was submitted by her family; no arrests were made.	NUJP	
Edgar Damalerio	Pagadian-based commentator and reporter at RPN–DXKP, managing director and editor of local The Zamboanga Scribe, editor (and correspondent) of Mindanao Gold Star; also worked in RPN-9	May 13	Pagadian, Zamboanga del Sur	An award-winning journalist, Damalerio, 32 or 33, was fatally shot by one of two unidentified motorcycle-riding men that had stopped his open vehicle while he was returning home from a press conference along with two friends. He had criticized local politicians and police, including its chief, for corruption and the failure to crack down on illegal drugs and criminal activities, and had received death threats. Despite the National Bureau of Investigation (NBI) opening an investigation, a series of cover-ups by police were reported. Two of three witnesses of the killing were later killed. After a trial in 2005 in Cebu, police officer Guillermo Wapile, an alleged hired killer identified as gunman by victim's companions, was sentenced to life in prison for the murder. Wapile had refused to name his accomplices and the instigators of the murder. One of the witnesses killed was Damalerio's fellow journalist, Edgar Amoro, who identified the gunman in 2005.	NUJP, CMFR, CPJ	
Sonny Alcantara	Presenter of a political program on private Celestron Cable TV; managing editor and publisher of local biweekly magazine Kokus; radio broadcaster	Aug 22	San Pablo, Laguna	Alcantara was shot by an unknown man as he rode from home. He had regularly criticized the municipal opposition and a former mayor, a businessman, which was said to had been behind the murder. He had received threats weeks prior to the killing. A witness later withdrew his evidence after being threatened. It is considered a cold case; murder suspects were later killed.	NUJP, CMFR, CPJ	

=== 2003 ===
CPJ reported six work-related murders; all remain unsolved and none were charged.

Name	Profile	Date	Place	Notes	Sources	Refs
John Belen Villanueva Jr.	Cultural programming at DZGB (Legazpi, Albay)	Apr 28	Camalig, Albay	Villanueva was gunned down. The case remains unsolved.	NUJP, CMFR	
Apolinario "Polly" Pobeda	DWTI-am (Lucena) commentator	May 17	Lucena	Pobeda, 35, was shot by two unidentified gunmen on motorcycles who had stopped him while riding his motorcycle to work. He often criticized corrupt local officials, especially the mayor whom he had accused of involvement in the local illegal drug trade; he had received repeated numerous anonymous death threats. By early 2005, three suspects were arrested, all linked to the mayor's family, including brothers identified as bodyguards of the mayor's son, also a councilor; a third person was said to have shot and killed Pobeda; those behind the murder are still unidentified. The case underwent trial.	NUJP, CMFR, CPJ	
Bonifacio Gregorio	Reporter and columnist of the weekly Dyaryo Banat (Tarlac); former village chief in La Paz town	Jul 8	La Paz, Tarlac	Gregorio was shot by an unidentified gunman in front of his house. Gregorio wrote many articles critical of municipal officials including the mayor. No arrests were made.	NUJP, CMFR, CPJ	
Noel Villarante	Blocktimer at DZJV; and in local periodical Laguna Score	Aug 19	Santa Cruz, Laguna	Villarante was fatally shot by a gunman in front of his house. Villarante was believed to have been killed because of his reports on drug trafficking, illegal gambling and local government corruption; another possible angle was his activity as a police informer. Concerns were expressed on the hesitant investigation as high-profile individuals were said to be involved. A suspect, a civilian police agent arrested few days after the killing, was released on bail in December 2004 as the investigation was shelved for lack of evidence. The former town police chief and three other policemen then shared a cash reward for the arrest of the presumed killer. For some time, police ransacked his house, confiscating articles he had written. The case was dismissed at the trial court.	NUJP, CMFR, CPJ	
Rico Ramirez	Commentator at DXSF (Butuan); reporter; cameraman	Aug 20	San Francisco, Agusan del Sur	Ramirez, 25, was shot on the roadside. He had engaged in critical reporting on local politicians. The murder was believed to be due to his investigations into drug trafficking. The case remains unsolved; it underwent preliminary investigation.	NUJP, CMFR, CPJ	
Juan "Jun" Pala Jr.	Program host and commentator on DXGO Aksyon Radyo (Davao City); former Davao City councilor; known anti-communist activist	Sep 6	Davao City	Known for his anti-communist commentaries, Pala was pronounced dead on arrival when he was shot by two unidentified motorcycle-riding gunmen while walking home with a bodyguard and a friend. The motive is unclear. Pala had survived two prior attacks, the most recent had been in April. Thereafter, Pala had been broadcasting from home his show that exposed corruption among local politicians. No arrests were made.	NUJP, CMFR, CPJ	
Nelson Nadura	DYME commentator (Masbate City); president of the Union of Print and Broadcast Journalists of Masbate; NPA rebel-turned-returnee	Dec 2	Masbate City	Nadura was shot by two unidentified gunmen while on his motorcycle leaving the station after his daily broadcast. The motive is unclear. Nadura, a blocktimer, had a news program wherein he criticized local officials. The NPA, said to be the suspects, denied their involvement. By 2014, the trial was ongoing, with other suspects at-large.	NUJP, CMFR, CPJ	

=== 2004 ===
RSF, noticing surge in violence in the election period, reported 2004, when general elections were held, as the deadliest year for the press at that time. That year and 2006 were the deadliest prior to the 2009 Maguindanao massacre, based on NUJP data.

Name	Profile	Attack/death	Notes	Sources	Refs.
Rowell/Ruel Endrinal	Blocktime program host and political commentator on DZRC (Legazpi) and publisher of Bicol Metro News	Feb. 11; Legazpi, Albay	Shot by two assailants as was just left his home and walked to work. He was critical of local politicians, especially the provincial governor. Endrinal had received death threats before, said to be linked to local politicians. Those behind the murder remain unidentified. Conviction reported; mastermind/s remained at large (as of 2014).	NUJP, CMFR, CPJ	
Elpidio/Eliseo "Ely" Binoya	Manila Broadcasting Company (MBC)–Radyo Natin commentator (General Santos)	June 17; General Santos	Gunned down by an assassin riding at the back of a motorcycle while riding home from the Prosecutor's office where he had just filed a formal complaint about being assaulted by thugs allegedly employed by the local mayor, whom he had criticized along with corrupt local police officials. Two suspects, a village chief whom he accused of corruption and believed the mastermind, and a former police intelligence official, either surrendered or were arrested in August. On March 6, 2006, a court acquitted a former police officer.	NUJP, CMFR, CPJ	
Rogelio "Roger" Mariano	Commentator and reporter for DZJC Aksyon Radyo (Laoag) and Radyo Natin in Ilocos Norte; Former commentator for DZVR Bombo Radyo; had chaired a multipurpose cooperative and a group of plant growers	July 31; San Nicolas, Ilocos Norte	Gunned down by assailants while on his motorcycle after his program. Believed to be work-related. Mariano, a known critic of government affairs, was about to report a story on alleged scams at a local electric company. Two of the four suspects charged with murder, including a former policeman, were arrested following a witness' testimony. Upon order from the Supreme Court in 2006, the court records, as well as suspects, were transferred from Ilocos Norte to Manila before the trial; two more suspects remain at large. Acquittal reported.	NUJP, CMFR, CPJ	
Arnnel Manalo	Batangas-based; provincial correspondent for DZRH and Bulgar tabloid; columnist and correspondent for provincial newspapers (Dyaryo Veritas and People's Courier)	Aug. 5 Bauan, Batangas	Shot dead by two motorcycle-riding gunmen. A contract killer was detained at the end of the month. The presumed instigator surrendered to the authorities the following month. Case dismissed at both the trial court and Ombudsman; accused gunman later killed.	NUJP, CMFR, CPJ	
Jonathan "Jun" Abayon	Reporter of DXBB RGMA Super Radyo General Santos	Aug 8 or 9 General Santos	Shot by a former soldier and former bodyguard of Manny Pacquiao following a heated argument; died after being under critical condition. Suspect remains at large as of 2012.	NUJP	
Fernando Consignado	Laguna-based volunteer reporter of Radio Veritas	Aug. 12; Nagcarlan, Laguna	Found dead with a gunshot wound in his home. He had received threats over a land dispute along with his commentaries.	NUJP; CPJ	
Jose Luis Villanueva	Assistant business editor of Today	Sept. 24; Pasay	Villanueva, 29, was stabbed by one of three robbers while riding a bus bound for Baclaran. The suspects were arrested later that month.		
Christopher Misajon	Ratsada news anchor and news reader at GMA Channel 6 (Iloilo City)	Incident: Sept. 23; Iloilo City Death: Sep 25	Misajon, 28, was said accidentally shot by one of four robbers who had stopped him, with a companion, in a vacant lot while he was driving. Another suspect later turned as witness. In a decision issued on Dec. 2012 and promulgated the following month, Iloilo RTC convicted three of the suspects of robbery with homicide and sentenced them to prison.		
Romeo/Romy Binungcal	Remate, Bulgar; Mt. Samat Forum (Bataan-based)	Sept. 29; Boundary of Balanga and Pilar, Bataan	Murdered	NUJP, CMFR, CPJ	
Eldy Gabinales (aka Eldy Sablas)	DXJR-fm Real Radio (Tandag)	Oct. 19; Tandag, Surigao del Sur	Murdered	NUJP, CMFR, CPJ	
Gene Boyd Lumawag	Photojournalist (Davao City-based) worked in MindaNews online publication	Nov. 12; Jolo, Sulu	Lumawag, 26, arrived in Sulu with a MindaNews editor; shot and killed in the pier as he was heading back to a hotel. There were various theories for the attack (including an Abu Sayyaf initiation rite and possible reprisal for a corruption story the two were pursuing.) A murder complaint was later filed against two Abu Sayyaf members, who are at large. Colleagues believed that the claimed involvement of Abu Sayyaf is difficult to verify. Case archived as suspects later killed.	NUJP, CMFR, CPJ	
Herson "Boy" Hinolan	Station manager and program host at DYIN Bombo Radyo (Kalibo)	Attack: Nov. 13; Kalibo, Aklan Death: Nov 15	Shot by a masked man in a local carnival while attempting to run. Murder charges were later filed against Alfredo Arcenio, former mayor of Lezo, Aklan, but were downgraded to homicide in 2005. In 2008, the Supreme Court granted a petition by the FFFJ and NUJP to transfer the venue of the cases of Hinolan and of Rolando Ureta from Aklan to Cebu. In May 2009, a witness was arrested for defying a subpoena. Arcenio had been imprisoned for eight years prior to his conviction on August 10, 2016, by Cebu City RTC, which sentenced him to 14 years in prison.	NUJP, CMFR, CPJ	
Michael Llorin	Freelance photojournalist in Manila	Nov. 13; Quezon City	Killed in a gas station	NUJP	
Allan Dizon	Photographer for dailies The Freeman and its sister periodical, Banat News tabloid (Cebu City)	Nov. 27; Cebu City	Shot dead in a reclamation area by one of two men on a motorcycle as he tried to flee. Businessman Edgar Belandres, Dizon's neighbor and identified as a shooter, was convicted of murder by a court on January 19, 2006, despite the prosecution's failure to present a motive; but was freed upon reversal of ruling by the Court of Appeals in 2010.	NUJP; CPJ	
Stephen Omaois	Kalinga-based; Guru News Weekly & DZRK	Abduction: Nov. 26 Death: December; Tabuk, Kalinga		NUJP; CPJ	

=== 2005 ===
Name	Profile	Attack/death	Notes	Sources	Refs.
Edgar Amoro	Freelance broadcaster worked as commentator at DXKP (Pagadian); School teacher	Feb. 2 Pagadian, Zamboanga del Sur	Amoro, in his 40s, was the second and witness in the 2002 murder of his colleague, Edgar Damalerio, to be killed when shot by gunmen, said to be accomplices of Damalerio's killer, in front of a high school where he was teaching, while walking home. Amoro was said to had received a death threat since 2002, shortly after dismissal of a police chief. On January 26, 2010, a court sentenced to life imprisonment one of the gunmen, Muhammad Maulana, for the murder; another suspect remains at large.	NUJP	
Arnulfo Villanueva	Asian Star Express Balita (Naic, Cavite) as columnist	Feb. 28; Naic, Cavite	Shot and killed by paramilitary agents shortly after he left his house; case reportedly "solved" by police.	NUJP; CPJ	
Romeo Sanchez	DZNL (San Fernando, La Union) as commentator	Mar. 9 Baguio	Killed by paramilitary agents inside a flea market.	NUJP (Note: Documented only by UNESCO.)	
Marlene Garcia-Esperat	Tacurong-based; columnist for provincial weekly The Midland Review and blocktime program presenter on DXKR; President of Tri-Media Association in Soccksargen Region; former ombudsman in the Department of Agriculture–Region 12 (DA–12) Her first husband, Severino Arcones, was murdered in 1989.	Mar. 24; Tacurong, Sultan Kudarat	Fatally shot during a family dinner in her home. She had exposed misconduct in the local government and filed corruption charges against several officials; especially in DA–12, and even accused its officers, Osmeña Montañer and Estrella Sabay, who were among the suspected masterminds for the murder; as well as the Fertilizer Fund scam in which President Gloria Macapagal Arroyo and her Secretary of Agriculture were implicated. On October 6, 2006, a Cebu City court convicted three men, including confessed killer Gerry Cabayag, of murder and sentenced them to life imprisonment; acquitted suspect-turned-state witness, a former military intelligence officer who admitted being the coordinator, for lack of evidence. Meanwhile, despite the witness' testimony and the support of the DOJ, charges against the suspected masterminds were dismissed by the Tacurong RTC, prompting a request to the Supreme Court to transfer the case to Cebu, wherein a motion to reinstate the cases was also dismissed. In 2008, murder charges were filed again and the Tacurong RTC eventually issued warrants of arrest. Case against masterminds reportedly archived.	NUJP; CMFR; CPJ	
Klein Cantoneros	DXAA-fm commentator and program host (Dipolog)	May 4 Dipolog, Zamboanga del Norte	Cantoneros, 34, was shot by three men on motorcycles as he stepped out of the station on his way home. He was known for his commentaries and criticisms of certain politicians, alleged corruption and illegal gambling. On January 29, 2010, Robert Woo was convicted of as an accomplice to the murder.	NUJP; CMFR; CPJ	
Philip Agustin	Editor-publisher of community periodical Starline Times Recorder in Dingalan, Aurora (with offices also in Isabela)	May 10; Dingalan, Aurora	Agustin, 54, was shot in his daughter's home by two assailants on a motorbike. Weeks prior, he had published an exposé on irregularities in Dingalan, with a mayor being implicated of embezzlement. Indicted before the municipal trial court were a hired gun and two others, as well as the mayor as the alleged mastermind, who surrendered in 2006. The same year, the Supreme Court agreed to transfer the case from Aurora to the Manila RTC, citing safety concerns and the mayor's influence. On May 14, 2009, another suspected mastermind was arrested in Mabalacat, Pampanga. Murder case against alleged mastermind dismissed, case archived for other suspects.	NUJP; CMFR; CPJ	
Rolando Morales	RMN–DXMD (South Cotabato) as anchorman	July 3 Polomolok, South Cotabato	Murdered. Case archived.	NUJP; CMFR; CPJ	
Ricardo "Ding" Uy	Anchor at DZRS-am (Sorsogon City); Chair of the city chapter of Bayan Muna	Nov. 18; Sorsogon City	Murdered inside his house. Uy criticized militarization in Sorsogon, letting the military to label him as a "communist supporter and NPA recruiter". Case archived.	NUJP; CMFR; CPJ	
Robert Ramos	Katapat, community paper in Laguna, as reporter	November; Cabuyao, Laguna	Ramos was fatally shot. In early April 2025, joint law enforcement groups arrested a suspect in Sapad, Lanao del Norte. Case archived earlier.	NUJP; CMFR; CPJ	
George Benaojan	DYDD Bantay Radyo reporter and commentator (Cebu City)	Dec. 1 Talisay, Cebu	Shot at a market. In October 2007, Roberto Jagdon, a former professional boxer originally charged of murder, was sentenced to 8–12 years in prison for homicide. Jagdon was believed to be a hired killer; mastermind remains free. No motive was established.	NUJP; CMFR; CPJ	

=== 2006 ===
The years 2006 and 2004 were the deadliest prior to the 2009 Maguindanao massacre, based on NUJP data.

Name	Profile	Attack/death	Notes	Sources	Refs.
Rolly Cañete	Freelancer worked in DXPR (Pagadian), as well as DXPA and DXBZ	Jan. 20; Pagadian, Zamboanga del Sur	Case dismissed at the trial court	NUJP; CMFR; CPJ	
Graciano Aquino	Central Luzon Forum (Bataan)	Jan. 21; Balanga, Bataan	Killed inside a cockfight arena	NUJP	
Orlando Mendoza	Freelancer worked in Tarlac Profile and Tarlac Patrol, both as editor-in-chief	Apr. 2 Tarlac City	Killed while riding from his farm. Case underwent investigation	NUJP; CMFR; CPJ	
Elpidio "Jojo" dela Victoria	DYRF Cebu City anchor Market administrator in Cebu City and project director of the city's Bantay Dagat Commission	Apr. 12; Talisay, Cebu	Shot while entering his house. Motives considered include his activity against illegal fishing. In September of that year, SPO1 Marcial Ocampo was sentenced by the court to 40 years in jail for murder. Two alleged accomplices and the mastermind remain unidentified.		
Nicolas Cervantes	Reportedly a freelance columnist who worked in Surigao Daily & Daily Tribune (Surigao)	May 2 Mandaluyong	Killed in front of his residence	NUJP	
Albert Orsolino	Saksi Ngayon tabloid (Metro Manila) as reporter	May 16; Boundary of Caloocan and Malabon	Killed while driving along the C4 Road. On June 26, 2013, Rommel Lirazan was convicted of murder by the Caloocan RTC.	NUJP	
Fernando "Dong" Batul	Commentator and program host at DYPR (Palawan Broadcasting Corporation; Puerto Princesa); also worked in DZRH; Former vice mayor of Puerto Princesa	May 22; Puerto Princesa	A murder case was filed against two gunmen, one of them was a police officer who had been criticized by the victim for alleged gun display. He was earlier arrested and tried. The death affected journalists in Palawan, especially when DYPR clashed with its competitor, politician-run DYER, over the issue. Acquittal reported.	NUJP; CMFR; CPJ	
George Vigo	Both Kidapawan-based; couple were part-time journalists, program hosts at Church-run DXND (Notre Dame Broadcasting Corporation). Also: Mr. Vigo: contributor for the Union of Catholic Asian News; Mrs. Vigo: columnist Couple were founders of a local periodical; both also peace advocates	June 19; Kidapawan, Cotabato	George, 36, and Maricel, 39, were gunned down by two or three motorcycle-riding assassins while on their way home from the city's public market. They had later reported and commented on local government issues. A case was filed against Juniver Madangguit, an alleged member of the Sparrow Unit of the NPA identified as a suspect along with three unknown individuals, which was later dismissed in late 2006 for lack of evidence. Human rights advocates saw evidence of a whitewash as the authorities linked NPA guerillas to the killing. When a new case was to be filed, this was become difficult as the task force investigating the case had been deactivated and with the suspicious death of Madangguit in 2007 in Makilala. On the other hand, the NBI reportedly stated that the gunmen were military operatives and that a politician might be the mastermind. Case underwent preliminary investigation.	NUJP; CMFR; CPJ	
Maricel (Macel) Alave–Vigo	Both Kidapawan-based; couple were part-time journalists, program hosts at Church-run DXND (Notre Dame Broadcasting Corporation). Also: Mr. Vigo: contributor for the Union of Catholic Asian News; Mrs. Vigo: columnist Couple were founders of a local periodical; both also peace advocates	June 19; Kidapawan, Cotabato		NUJP; CMFR; CPJ	
Armando "Rachman" Pace	Blocktimer and commentator at DXDS Radyo Ukay (Digos)	July 18; Digos	Shot dead by two motorcycle-riding assailants on his way home from work. He had been facing libel lawsuits filed by politicians. On April 29, 2009, a court convicted Joy Anticamara, identified as a gunman, of homicide and sentenced him to 10–17 years in prison.	NUJP; CMFR; CPJ	
Ralph Ruñez	RPN-9 (Metro Manila) as cameraman	July 28; Metro Manila		NUJP	
Prudencio "Dick" Melendrez	Tanod tabloid (Metro Manila); also in Saksi Ngayon as photographer	July 31; Malabon	Killed by gunmen near his house while on his way to work.	NUJP	
Ponciano Grande	Former reporter for The Recorder and The Nueva Ecija Times (Nueva Ecija-based) and former assistant information writer for DWNE; also worked in DWJJ	Dec. 7 Cabanatuan	Killed by two motorcycle-riding men in his farm. Robbery was considered as the motive.	NUJP; CPJ	
Andres "Andy" Acosta	Reporter for DZJC Aksyon Radyo (Laoag) and the monthly Northern Light	Dec. 20; Batac, Ilocos Norte	Acosta, 46, was stabbed to death by assailants while on his way home from Laoag. Revenge is said to be the motive.	NUJP; CPJ	

=== 2007 ===
Name	Profile	Attack/death	Notes	Sources	Refs.
Hernani Pastolero Sr.	Associate publisher of a local weekly Lightning Courier (Cotabato City); Started in the broadcast industry; former editor-in-chief of another, then-defunct local Mindanao Newscast	Feb. 19; Sultan Kudarat, Shariff Kabunsuan	Shot dead by a lone assailant outside his house. The motive is yet to be established as none has been willing to give a statement on the incident.	NUJP; CPJ	
Carmelo "Mark" Palacios	Police reporter for the government-run DZRB Radyo ng Bayan (Nueva Ecija-based); Former head of an anti-crime group based in Nueva Ecija	Apr. 18; Santa Rosa, Nueva Ecija	Palacios, 41, who was last seen near police headquarters in Cabanatuan a day before, was found dead in a village. He sustained various wounds. Palacios was said to had "earned the ire" of certain people involved in crimes and corruption that he had reported. Cold case.	NUJP; CMFR; CPJ	
Dodie Nuñez	Katapat (Cavite)	May 21		NUJP	
Vicente Sumalpong	Reporter worked at Radyo ng Bayan Tawi-Tawi, also production supervisor	June 25; Bongao, Tawi-Tawi	Shot near his house. Despite the case transferred to NBI, incident remains unresolved.	NUJP	
Fernando "Batman" Lintuan	Davao City-based; DXGO Aksyon Radyo (Manila Broadcasting Company) blocktimer and SunStar columnist	Dec. 24; Davao City	Survivor of the 1987 DXRA attack, was gunned down by motorcycle-riding assassins after leaving his radio program. His companions in a car he drove, two radiomen, left unhurt. On April 22, 2009, a court acquitted a man charged of murder, many believed as a fall guy, due to insufficient evidence.	NUJP; CMFR; CPJ	

=== 2008 ===
Name	Profile	Attack/death	Notes	Sources	Refs.
Benefredo Acabal	The Filipino Newsmen tabloid (Cavite & Bulacan) as publisher & columnist	Apr. 7 Pasig		NUJP; CPJ	
Marcos Mataro	D'X-Man host at UNTV-37 (Metro Manila); Minister, Ang Dating Daan	Apr. 27; San Simon, Pampanga	Attacked by two masked gunmen at a North Luzon Expressway toll gate. Case underwent preliminary investigation.	NUJP; CMFR	
Fausto "Bert" Sison	Correspondent (contributor) for the weekly Regional Bulletin and at the Lucena-based DZAT-am as music program host	June 30; Sariaya, Quezon	Sison, 60, and his two daughters, also working for the said newspaper, were on their way home from a party when two unidentified motorcycle-riding men opened fire at his car. Sison died; the daughters survived. The suspects and the motive remain identified. Case dismissed in court due to insufficient evidence against suspects.	NUJP; CMFR	
Martin Roxas	RMN–DYVR (Roxas) program director; program host Auditor, NUJP–Capiz	Aug. 7 Roxas, Capiz	Roxas, 32, who denounced government corruption, was shot by a gunman on a motorcycle while on his way home from his noon time program. Roxas had discussed for two weeks the alleged anomalies on the financial aid during an administration of a mayor. Two suspects were arrested a few weeks later. Case underwent trial.	NUJP; CMFR; CPJ	
Dennis Cuesta	Program director and commentator of RMN–DXMD (General Santos)	Attack: Aug. 4 General Santos Death: Aug. 9	Cuesta, 38, who denounced government corruption, was fatally shot by one (believed to be a hired) of the motorcycle-riding assailants near a shopping mall while walking on his way home from work. Believed to be work-related. A month before, Cuesta had reported in his program water contamination in a village, with an association later investigated. He then received death threats. On July 13, 2009, the Supreme Court granted a petition to transfer the trial for the murder from General Santos to Makati. A police inspector related to the then-mayor, identified as the main suspect and one of the gunmen, remained at large despite an arrest order in 2009; the murder charge against him has been archived. Case remains unresolved.	NUJP; CMFR; CPJ	
Arecio Padrigao Sr.	Anchor (and commentator) of a blocktime weekly program for DXRS-fm Radyo Natin (Gingoog) and columnist for the local Mindanao Monitor Today	Nov. 17; Gingoog	Padrigao, 55, was gunned down by a motorcycle-riding assassin in front of a university. His killing appeared to be work-related. Padrigao criticized local government corruption as well as illegal logging activities in his province on his program and had received threats. Conviction reported for a suspect (pled guilty to homicide while trial is ongoing for another one).	NUJP; CMFR; CPJ	
Leo Mila	Anchoring programs (and commentator) at Radyo Natin; also worked at En Peryodista	Dec. 2 San Roque, Northern Samar	Mila, 38, was on his way home from his afternoon program when unknown assailants shot him. Mila had received death threats because of his commentaries. Killing is believed to be work-related.	NUJP; CMFR; CPJ	

=== 2009 ===
TF Usig documented five of these cases; classified that of Perez, Castillo and Linao as work-related, while that of Petalvero and Abbas otherwise.

Name	Profile	Attack/death	Notes	Sources	Refs.
Badrodin Abbas Other records: Badrodin Abas	DXCM Radyo Ukay as blocktime program host (commentator)	January; Cotabato City	Shot by two unidentified assailants. He was known for hard‑hitting stories. Case under investigation.	NUJP; CPJ	
Ernesto Rollin	DXSY-am (Oroquieta) as announcer	Feb. 23; Oroquieta, Misamis Occidental	Murdered. Case underwent trial.	NUJP; CMFR; CPJ	
Tiburcio "Jojo" Trajano Jr.	Remate	June 3 Taytay, Rizal	Killed in a dangerous assignment. Case filed; suspects later killed.	CMFR; CPJ	
Crispin Perez	Lawyer-broadcaster; one of weekday program anchors (and commentator) at DWDO; Former vice governor of Occidental Mindoro	June 9 San Jose, Occidental Mindoro	Shot by a gunman outside of his house. On April 14, 2016, the Lipa RTC acquitted police officer Darwin Quimoyog, accused in the murder, citing that the testimonies of some witnesses were "only circumstantial evidence".	NUJP; CMFR; CPJ	
Antonio Castillo	Bigwasan tabloid reporter	June 12; Uson, Masbate	Shot by two men. He was known for his criticism of local politicians in Masbate. In July, a murder case was filed against the suspects, one of them identified, both remain at large. Case archived	NUJP; CMFR	
Jonathan Petalvero	DXVM-fm as commentator	June 25; Bayugan, Agusan del Sur	Killed by a gunman. Murder charges were filed in July against a suspect.	NUJP	
Godofredo Linao Jr.	Radyo Natin Bislig as program coordinator	July 27; Barobo, Surigao del Sur	Shot by a gunman. A murder case was filed the following day against several suspects who remain at large. Case archived	NUJP; CMFR; CPJ	
Ismael Pasigma/Pasigna	B96 FM (Zamboanga del Norte) as commentator	Dec. 24; Labason, Zamboanga del Norte	Case underwent trial	NUJP; CMFR; CPJ	

==== Journalists killed in Maguindanao massacre ====
Thirty-two journalists were among 58 people murdered on November 23, 2009 in Maguindanao as they accompanied the convoy of the family and supporters of Buluan vice mayor Esmael Mangudadatu; and were about to cover the filing of candidacy on the latter's behalf for provincial governor of Maguindanao for the 2010 election. They had departed from Mangudadatu's residence and before reaching Shariff Aguak, came across the ruling Ampatuan family's "private army" of approximately 200, allegedly led by Datu Unsay mayor Andal Ampatuan Jr. and with law enforcement authorities, at Ampatuan town. The Ampatuans waylaid the group, as well as passers-by and diverted them to a hill wherein they shot the victims dead, with their bodies and some of the vehicles later buried in the pits by clan members. Within few days, all were retrieved except a body of one journalist which remains missing. This incident is the world's single worst attack on the media members and the country's worst incident of electoral violence.

Journalists and media workers killed in Maguindanao massacre (Note: All names of the 32 are from the CPJ data. Meanwhile, 30 are listed in the UNESCO data; not in their list are the names of Jepon Cadagdagon, Jolito Evardo, and Daniel Tiamson, but included there is a journalist whose name is Eugene Dohillo.)
Name	Age	Profile	Refs.
Bengie Adolfo	20	From Gold Star Daily: Adolfo: driver The rest are correspondents.	
Rubello Bataluna	44	From Gold Star Daily: Adolfo: driver The rest are correspondents.	
Jose "Jhoy" Duhay		From Gold Star Daily: Adolfo: driver The rest are correspondents.	
Ronnie Perante	43	From Gold Star Daily: Adolfo: driver The rest are correspondents.	
Henry Araneta	42	DZRH correspondent	
Mc Delbert "Mac-mac" Arriola	20	From UNTV: Arriola: cameraman Evardo: assistant cameraman Nuñez: news anchor and reporter Tiamzon: driver	
Jolito Evardo	23	From UNTV: Arriola: cameraman Evardo: assistant cameraman Nuñez: news anchor and reporter Tiamzon: driver	
Victor Nuñez	24	From UNTV: Arriola: cameraman Evardo: assistant cameraman Nuñez: news anchor and reporter Tiamzon: driver	
Daniel Tiamzon	52	From UNTV: Arriola: cameraman Evardo: assistant cameraman Nuñez: news anchor and reporter Tiamzon: driver	
Arturo Betia		From Periodico Ini: Betia: marketing director Caniban: news bureau chief Decena: circulation manager Legarta: contributor Merisco: columnist Razon: sales manager Also: Caniban: Sultan Kudarat Gazette associate publisher Decena: worked in Rapido; Merisco: worked in Tingog MindaNOW; Legarta: Tingog Mindanao publisher, worked in Prontiera News	
John Caniban	30	From Periodico Ini: Betia: marketing director Caniban: news bureau chief Decena: circulation manager Legarta: contributor Merisco: columnist Razon: sales manager Also: Caniban: Sultan Kudarat Gazette associate publisher Decena: worked in Rapido; Merisco: worked in Tingog MindaNOW; Legarta: Tingog Mindanao publisher, worked in Prontiera News	
Noel Decena		From Periodico Ini: Betia: marketing director Caniban: news bureau chief Decena: circulation manager Legarta: contributor Merisco: columnist Razon: sales manager Also: Caniban: Sultan Kudarat Gazette associate publisher Decena: worked in Rapido; Merisco: worked in Tingog MindaNOW; Legarta: Tingog Mindanao publisher, worked in Prontiera News	
Bienvenido Legarta Jr.	36	From Periodico Ini: Betia: marketing director Caniban: news bureau chief Decena: circulation manager Legarta: contributor Merisco: columnist Razon: sales manager Also: Caniban: Sultan Kudarat Gazette associate publisher Decena: worked in Rapido; Merisco: worked in Tingog MindaNOW; Legarta: Tingog Mindanao publisher, worked in Prontiera News	
Rey Merisco		From Periodico Ini: Betia: marketing director Caniban: news bureau chief Decena: circulation manager Legarta: contributor Merisco: columnist Razon: sales manager Also: Caniban: Sultan Kudarat Gazette associate publisher Decena: worked in Rapido; Merisco: worked in Tingog MindaNOW; Legarta: Tingog Mindanao publisher, worked in Prontiera News	
Fernando "Ranny" Razon	44	From Periodico Ini: Betia: marketing director Caniban: news bureau chief Decena: circulation manager Legarta: contributor Merisco: columnist Razon: sales manager Also: Caniban: Sultan Kudarat Gazette associate publisher Decena: worked in Rapido; Merisco: worked in Tingog MindaNOW; Legarta: Tingog Mindanao publisher, worked in Prontiera News	
Romeo Jimmy "Pal-ak" Cabillo		From Midland Review: Cabillo: correspondent Momay: photographer and messenger	
Reynaldo "Bebot" Momay (Note: A body of Reynaldo Momay, reportedly among those 32 died, remains missing; only the rest were recovered.)	61	From Midland Review: Cabillo: correspondent Momay: photographer and messenger	
Marites Cablitas	37	From News Focus: Cablitas: publisher Morales: circulation manager Cabitas: RPN–DXDX news anchor	
Rosell Morales	34	From News Focus: Cablitas: publisher Morales: circulation manager Cabitas: RPN–DXDX news anchor	
Hannibal Cachuela	50	Manila Star correspondent and Punto News bureau chief	
Jephon Cadagdagon	28	From Saksi Balita/Saksi Mindanaoan News: Cadagdagon: photographer Dela Cruz, Montaño: correspondents Montaño: DXCP (talent, reporter); Also RGMA Super Radyo part-time reporter; sales account executive	
Gina Dela Cruz	41	From Saksi Balita/Saksi Mindanaoan News: Cadagdagon: photographer Dela Cruz, Montaño: correspondents Montaño: DXCP (talent, reporter); Also RGMA Super Radyo part-time reporter; sales account executive	
Marife "Neneng" Montaño		From Saksi Balita/Saksi Mindanaoan News: Cadagdagon: photographer Dela Cruz, Montaño: correspondents Montaño: DXCP (talent, reporter); Also RGMA Super Radyo part-time reporter; sales account executive	
Eleanor "Leah" Dalmacio	38	From Socsargen News Today/Socksargen Today: Dalmacio: reporter, office secretary Subang: publisher	
Francisco "Ian" Subang Jr.	49	From Socsargen News Today/Socksargen Today: Dalmacio: reporter, office secretary Subang: publisher	
Santos Gatchalian Jr.	51	From Mindanao Daily Gazette: Gatchalian: reporter Lupogan: Davao City-based reporter; publisher Gatchalian: DXGO Davao City	
Lindo Lupogan	42	From Mindanao Daily Gazette: Gatchalian: reporter Lupogan: Davao City-based reporter; publisher Gatchalian: DXGO Davao City	
Joel Parcon	49	Prontiera News correspondent	
Ernesto "Bart" Maravilla		News anchor and reporter at Bombo Radyo Koronadal	
Alejandro "Bong" Reblando	54	Manila Bulletin correspondent and Reuters stringer	
Napoleon "Nap" Salaysay	55	Publisher and editor-in-chief of Clear View Gazette	
Andres "Andy" Teodoro	59	Mindanao Inquirer editor-in-chief, People's Forum	
Attack and death: November 23, 2009; Ampatuan, Maguindanao			
Sources: NUJP, CMFR, CPJ

The incident resulted in the declaration of martial law by President Gloria Arroyo in December, which lasted for nine days.

Fifteen of the 197 accused were members of the Ampatuan clan including the masterminds, former provincial governor Andal Sr., died July 2015, and his sons, Andal Jr. and Zaldy, former Autonomous Region in Muslim Mindanao governor. On December 19, 2019, in a verdict by Quezon City RTC, 28 principal respondents, including eight Ampatuan clan members especially the brothers, were convicted for 57 counts of murder, including 31 media workers, and were sentenced with reclusión perpetua without parole; 15 were sentenced to lower prison terms for being accessories to the crime.

By January 2020, four more accused, one of them among those acquitted, were under police custody; 77 remain at large.

Suspects in the Maguindanao massacre case
Status		No.
Individuals originally indicted		197
Arrested		117
During the trial	Discharged and/or released	8
During the trial	Died	8
During the trial	Had faced the trial	101
During the trial	Granted bail	11
During the trial	Remained under detention	90
2019 verdict	Convicted (sentenced to reclusión perpetua)	28
2019 verdict	Convicted (sentenced to 6–10 years imprisonment)	15
2019 verdict	Acquitted	57
Remained at large at the time of the verdict		80
Accused under police custody after the verdict (by January 2020)		4 (Note: One of them, surrendered in Jan. 2020, is among those acquitted in the case.)

== 2010s ==
=== 2010 ===
In the final month of the Arroyo administration, three radio journalists were killed. Desidario Camangyan was killed while hosting a singing contest at Manay, Davao Oriental on June 14. Within 48 hours, Joselito Agustin was murdered in Bacarra, Ilocos Norte, for his political reporting. Nestor Bedolido was the last journalist killed that month.

Name	Profile	Attack/death	Notes	Sources	Refs.
Desiderio "Jessie" Camangyan Other records: Desidario Camangyan	Sunrise FM (Mati, Davao Oriental) as broadcaster	June 14; Manay, Davao Oriental	Camangyan, 50, was shot dead while onstage hosting a singing contest; reportedly over his criticisms on illegal logging activity. Case underwent trial.	NUJP; CMFR; CPJ	
Jovelito Agustin	DZJC Aksyon Radyo Laoag as broadcaster	June 15 or 16; Boundary of Laoag and Bacarra, Ilocos Norte	Agustin, 37, was gunned down by two men on motorcycles while on his way home; reportedly over his criticisms against corruption. Nephew injured. Case underwent trial.	NUJP; CMFR; CPJ	
Nestor Bedolido	Mt. Apo Current and Kastigador weekly as reporter, columnist	June 19; Digos	Assassinated allegedly over criticisms against a politician. Case underwent preliminary investigation.	NUJP; CMFR	
Jose Daguio	Former journalist based in Kalinga; Former DZRK Radyo ng Bayan broadcaster; former reporter-commentator of a Radyo Natin station; retired columnist of a provincial daily	July 3 Tabuk, Kalinga	Daguio, 75, was shot dead while having a dinner in his home. The police claimed he was killed by cattle rustlers he had exposed. Five suspects were later charged for the murder, including an arrested suspected gunman, another, Lando Bilog, who was found dead in the Kalinga–Isabela border before arrest warrants were about to be issued, and Edmund Bilog, who was convicted of homicide by the Roxas, Isabela RTC on Dec. 8, 2017.		
Miguel "Mike" Belen	Volunteer field reporter at DWEB-fm (Nabua)	Attack: July 9 Nabua, Camarines Sur Death: July 31; Iriga, same province	Belen, 48, was shot by motorcycle-riding men while on his way home to Iriga. Murder charges were filed against suspects who were supposedly identified by him before his death. They include Eric Vargas, an alleged gunman convicted in 2015 by the Iriga RTC and sentenced to a 40-year prison term; another is an NPA member. This was cited in a 2013 report by PCIJ as the only case in the first six months of the Aquino III administration and considered work-related.	NUJP; CMFR; CPJ	
Edilberto Cruz	Publisher-editor of the defunct Salida tabloid (Nueva Ecija)	Aug. 1 Cabanatuan	Shot while driving a motorcycle. Murder charges were later filed against a freelance female broadcaster, who was his partner and co-worker.		
Edison Flameniana Sr.	Mindanao Inquirer columnist	Dec. 10; Labangan, Zamboanga del Sur	Shot dead		

=== 2011 ===
Name	Profile	Attack/death	Notes	Sources	Refs.
Gerardo "Doc Gerry" Ortega	Commentator and daily talk show anchor at RMN–DWAR; Environmentalist	Jan. 24; Puerto Princesa	Murdered by a lone gunman in a store, after his broadcast. Ortega had criticized the misuse of the royalties arising from the Malampaya gas field off Palawan. A team of hired killers was arrested later. Nine suspects include the alleged masterminds, former Governor Mario Joel Reyes and his brother, former Coron mayor Mario Reyes, both indicted by the DOJ and later managed to escape amid the issuance of an arrest warrant; as well as self-confessed assailant Marlon Recamata who, in May 2013, was convicted and sentenced to life imprisonment. In September 2015, the Reyes brothers were arrested in Phuket, Thailand. They were deported back to the Philippines and detained at the Puerto Princesa City Jail. Joel Reyes was released on January 4, 2018, after the Court of Appeals (CA) cleared him of the murder charges. However, the CA reversed its decision in 2019 and reordered his arrest. In 2023, the Supreme Court ordered the continuation of the Ortega murder trial and Reyes' re-arrest. On September 11, 2024, Joel Reyes surrendered to the National Bureau of Investigation.	NUJP; CMFR; CPJ	
Niel Jimena	RMN–DYRI (Iloilo City) blocktimer	Aug. 22; Enrique B. Magalona, Negros Occidental	Killed. Two suspects were identified. Case underwent trial.	NUJP; CMFR; CPJ	
Antonio Silagon	Bohol Balita Daily News tabloid publisher	December; Trinidad, Bohol	Killed. Case underwent trial.	NUJP; CMFR	
Cirilo Gallardo	DWWM Spirit FM DJ and newscaster (Bangued)	Feb. 1 Bangued, Abra	Killed	NUJP	
Roy Gallego	Freelancer worked as blocktimer in DXDA, DXSF, DXJM, and 92.7 Smile FM	Oct. 14; Lianga, Surigao del Sur	Killed. Case archived.	NUJP; CMFR; CPJ	
Alfredo "Dodong" Velarde Jr.	Brigada News circulation manager	Nov. 11; General Santos	Shot dead by a gunman while driving his car.	NUJP	
Marlina/Maria Len Flores–Sumera	DZME anchor President of a homeowners' group	Mar. 24; Malabon	Shot dead by a gunman near her house while on her way to her work. Sumera was president of a homeowners' group which was involved in land disputes, which she also covered in her program. She had received threats allegedly from another group in the said city. In April, charges were filed against four alleged members of the Partisanong Armadong Operatiba ng Partidong Marxista-Leninista ng Pilipinas who were identified as suspects. Suspects remain at-large.	NUJP; CMFR; CPJ	
Romeo (Romy) Olea	DWEB-fm program host (commentator and reporter)	June 13; Iriga, Camarines Sur	Gunned down by one of two unidentified motorcycle-riding men while on his way to work. Olea had discussed issues on the city government in his program. The murder was classified as a cold case because of lack of information for possible suspects.	NUJP; CMFR; CPJ	
Johnson Pascual	Based in Maddela, Quirino; acting editor-in-chief and columnist for the now-defunct FICO's Prime News, columnist of a local weekly Northeast Journal; Branch manager of the First Isabela Cooperative (FICO) Bank in the same municipality	October; Alicia, Isabela	Shot dead by two motorcycle-riding men while driving a van from Alicia to Cauayan. The motive was said related to his work as a bank manager. A suspect was arrested in Oct. 2012 for the murder.		

=== 2012 ===
Name	Profile	Attack/death	Notes	Sources	Refs.
Aldion Layao	DXRP blocktimer; also worked in GMA Super Radyo Davao; Barangay chairman	Apr. 8 Davao City	Shot by motorcycle-riding assassins inside his car while on his way home from work. A suspect was identified.	NUJP; CMFR; CPJ	
Christopher Guarin	Publisher in local Tatak News and (blocktime) commentator also worked in Radyo Mo Nationwide and RGMA Super Radyo	Jan. 5 General Santos	Shot by a gunman on a motorcycle who fired at his car.	NUJP; CPJ	
Nestor Libaton	Catholic-run DXHM anchor	May 8 Mati, Davao Oriental	Shot dead by unknown motorcycle-riding assailants as he was leaving for Tarragona, Davao Oriental. No motive was found. Case underwent trial.	NUJP; CMFR; CPJ	
Rommel "Jojo" Palma	DXMC Bombo Radyo reporter and driver	Apr. 30; Koronadal, South Cotabato	Killed. No case filed yet.	NUJP; CMFR	
Julius Cauzo	Political commentator and program host at DWJJ-am; Vice president of the Nueva Ecija Press Club	Nov. 8 Cabanatuan	Murdered by a motorcycle-riding gunman reportedly while on his way back to the studios of his station. Cauzo was said to have received several death threats. Despite police having witnesses' accounts on two unidentified men at the scene prior to the crime and digital composite sketches of these men, their only lead, as well as a cash reward from local officials for their arrest, there was little progress in the case. PCIJ, on its Nov. 2013 report, noticed some faults in the investigation, including reports on the existence of any evidences. The motive remains unknown and no arrests were made.	NUJP; CMFR; CPJ	
Nixon Cua	Pilipino Star Ngayon	July 22		NUJP	
Eddie Jesus Apostol	DXND	Sep 1		CPJ	

=== 2013 ===
The International News Safety Institute (INSI) reported that a total of 14 journalists died; the International Federation of Journalists (IFJ) documented 13 cases, nine of them targeted killings. Another four, died on duty at radio stations as super typhoon Haiyan (Yolanda) hit Tacloban, were also included by INSI and IFJ, which categorized them as accidental deaths. On the other hand, the Center for Media Freedom and Responsibility said ten other media workers remained missing and were presumed dead.

Meanwhile, Human Rights Watch reported only 12 killed journalists.

Name	Profile	Attack/death	Notes	Sources	Refs.
Dr. Edgardo Adajar	Hot FM 101.5 blocktimer	January; San Pablo, Laguna	Killed. Two accused were identified. Case filed, suspects at large by Nov. 2014.	NUJP; CMFR	
Richard Kho	All were from the weekly tabloid Aksyon Ngayon: Kho: staff member and columnist Loreto: publisher and columnist	July 30; Quezon City	Kho, 47, and Loreto, 59, were fatally shot by two assailants on motorcycles outside a convenience store. On Oct. 23, 2014, Benji Bate, entering into a plea bargaining, pleaded guilty before the Quezon City RTC for the killing. Other suspect remains at large	NUJP; CMFR; CPJ; IFJ	
Bonifacio Loreto Jr.	All were from the weekly tabloid Aksyon Ngayon: Kho: staff member and columnist Loreto: publisher and columnist	July 30; Quezon City	Kho, 47, and Loreto, 59, were fatally shot by two assailants on motorcycles outside a convenience store. On Oct. 23, 2014, Benji Bate, entering into a plea bargaining, pleaded guilty before the Quezon City RTC for the killing. Other suspect remains at large	NUJP; CMFR; CPJ; IFJ	
Mario Vendiola Baylosis	Announcer and presenter at 101.7 FM Radyo Natin and DXNC Radyo Suhnan	Apr. 22; Kabasalan, Zamboanga Sibugay	Baylosis, 33, was killed by two unidentified motorcycle-riding gunmen. He had received a threat.	NUJP; CPJ; IFJ	
Miguelito "Mike" Rueras	DYDD El Nuevo Bantay Radyo correspondent	June 2 Pio V. Corpuz, Masbate	No case filed as suspect later found killed.	CMFR	
Mario Sy	Freelance photojournalist; regular contributor for daily local tabloid Sapol News Bulletin	Aug. 1 General Santos	Sy, 53, was shot by unidentified gunmen who had entered his home. Case underwent investigation.	NUJP; CMFR; CPJ; IFJ	
Fernando "Nanding" Solijon	Commentator and host at DXLS Love Radio Iligan	Aug. 29; Iligan	Shot while leaving a friend's house and crossing a street by an assailant, who later escaped on an accomplice's motorcycle. A critic of corruption and crime in the city, he had received threats; motive reportedly may be political. Case filed; suspect remains at large; other suspect found dead.	NUJP; CMFR; CPJ; IFJ	
Vergel Bico	Calapan-based; editor and publisher of the weekly Kalahi; editor of Bandera Pilipino	Sept. 4 Calapan, Oriental Mindoro	Bico, 40 or 41, was shot by two motorcycle-riding assailants. He had written on several issues, particularly the drug trade. Case underwent investigation.	NUJP; CMFR; CPJ; IFJ	
Jesus "Jessie" Tabanao	Program anchor and reporter at DYRC Radyo Calungsod; Former Bombo Radyo assistant station manager; information officer of the Philippine Drug Enforcement Agency–Region 7	Sept. 14; Cebu City	Tabanao, 35, was shot by unidentified motorcycle-riding gunman who remain. Classified as work-related as he had reported on the illegal drug trade.	NUJP; CMFR; CPJ; IFJ	
Later cases cited.
Joash (Joas) Dignos	Program host at DXGT Radyo Abante (Maramag)	Nov. 29; Valencia, Bukidnon	Shot dead by four assailants in a gathering in front of a building. He was a critic of some politicians and government officials; attack was linked to his commentary. Suspects remain at large; case was filed against one of them.	NUJP; CMFR; CPJ; IFJ	
Michael [Diaz] Milo Other records: Michael "Mike" Melo	National supervisor and commentator for DXFM Prime FM 99.1 (Tandag) and program host; managing editor for Prime Balita	Dec. 6 Tandag, Surigao del Sur	Shot dead by gunmen; attack was linked to his commentary. Murder charges were later filed against eight suspects including the victim's wife, a police officer, and four unidentified, including the gunman. Family problems were said to be the motive.	NUJP; IFJ	
Rogelio "Tata" Butalid Other records: Rogelio Butalib	Blocktime commentator for 107.9 Radyo Natin Tagum; Former broadcaster in DXDN; village councilor	Dec. 11; Tagum, Davao del Norte	Shot dead by one of unidentified motorcycle-riding men shortly after he concluded his program, which had tackled local issues, particularly corruption. This was linked to his criticisms, particularly issues in the Davao del Norte Electric Cooperative (DANECO). A mayor was implicated and was said to had directed a "death squad". No action was taken against him and his accomplices.	NUJP; CMFR; CPJ; IFJ	

==== Journalists killed during Typhoon Haiyan ====
Eight media practitioners were among those who died as Typhoon Haiyan (Yolanda) hit Tacloban on November 8; four of them in the line of duty.

Several local media stations and offices in the city were destroyed by the storm.

Journalists and media workers who died or went missing during Typhoon Haiyan (Note: The names are not included in any data from media watchdogs.)
Name	Profile	Notes	Refs.
Four radio broadcasters died in line of duty, as their stations went off the air during news coverages.
Archie (Archi) Globio	Announcers & reporters at DYBR Apple Radio Tacloban	Both died as their station was hit by storm surges. Globio though, was reported missing (as of early December).	
Malou Realino	Announcers & reporters at DYBR Apple Radio Tacloban	Both died as their station was hit by storm surges. Globio though, was reported missing (as of early December).	
Allan Medino	From DYVL Aksyon Radyo Tacloban: Medino: technician Viñas: Anchor/reporter Viñas was also the vice president of the Samar Island Press Club.	Their station office, located near the sea, was damaged, mainly by a storm surge. Medino was found inside the station's announcer's booth. Viñas was last seen at the station's door; confirmed dead though still missing (as of 2015). Two family members of their personnel were killed as well.	
Ronald Viñas	From DYVL Aksyon Radyo Tacloban: Medino: technician Viñas: Anchor/reporter Viñas was also the vice president of the Samar Island Press Club.	Their station office, located near the sea, was damaged, mainly by a storm surge. Medino was found inside the station's announcer's booth. Viñas was last seen at the station's door; confirmed dead though still missing (as of 2015). Two family members of their personnel were killed as well.	
Four other journalists died in the aftermath, from complications of their diseases.
Ariel Aguillon	Bombo Radyo Tacloban technician	Reportedly buried at Palo, Leyte.	
Gregorio Caing	EV Mail		
Rolie Montilla	Eastern Times		
Dindo Ortiza	Leyte Samar Daily Express		
Deaths or disappearances: On and after November 8, 2013; Tacloban			
Sources: NUJP, CMFR, CPJ, IFJ

=== 2014 ===
Name	Profile	Attack/death	Notes	Sources	Refs.
Robelita/Rubylita "Ruby" Garcia	Remate tabloid correspondent, DWAD blocktimer President of a regional journalists' group and a National Press Club member	Apr. 6 Bacoor, Cavite	Had been working as a radio blocktimer a few weeks when was shot by two unidentified men in her house. A feud with a police officer was said to be a possible motive. Case underwent investigation.	NUJP; CMFR; CPJ	
Richard "DJ Troy" Nadjid/Najid	Broadcaster at DXNN Power Myx FM and also worked in DXGD-am	May 4 Bongao, Tawi-Tawi	Killed. Case underwent investigation.	NUJP; CMFR; CPJ	
Samuel "Sammy" Oliverio	Program host in DXDS Radyo Ukay, owned by UM Broadcasting Network, and Supreme Radio	May 23; Digos	Fatally shot by two motorcycle-riding attackers while driving home. Police confirmed his death was work-related and politically motivated. Case underwent preliminary investigation.	NUJP; CMFR; CPJ	
Nilo Baculo Sr.	DWIM Radyo Mindoro	June 9 Calapan, Oriental Mindoro	Case underwent investigation.	NUJP; CMFR; CPJ	

=== 2015 ===
The CPJ excluded the Philippines on its list of the twenty deadliest for journalists after eight years. It recorded at least seven media killings in 2015, though it reported none of them as work-related. The CMFR said that nine journalists were killed in 2015, at least three of them work-related: Ybañez, Escanilla, and Maestrado.

- Nerlita "Nerlie" Ledesma, Abante tabloid reporter based in Balanga, Bataan, was shot and killed by unidentified motorcycle-riding gunmen on January 8 while she was on the way to work.
- Maurito Lim, dyRD, died on February 14.
- Melinda "Mei" Magsino, Philippine Daily Inquirer, died on April 13. (Note: Documented only by CPJ.)
- Gregorio (Gregory) Ybañez was publisher of local weekly Kabayan News, president of Davao del Norte Press and Radio-TV Club (DNRPC), and a director of the National Electrification Administration (NEA) bloc. He was fatally gunned down at his residence in Tagum, Davao del Norte on August 18. He had been writing a column about an ongoing dispute between two DANECO factions; in that conflict he was involved.
- Teodoro Escanilla was a program anchor at a local radio station (DZMS), chairperson of a local workers' organization and spokesperson of human rights group Karapatan. He was shot by two gunmen outside his home in Barcelona, Sorsogon on August 19. It was believed that his commentaries and being an activist were possible motives.
- Cosme (Diaz) Maestrado, commentator at a local radio station (DXOC), was shot dead in front of a shopping center in Ozamiz, Misamis Occidental on August 27. He had received death threats; he survived an assassination attempt in 2011.
- Jose Bernardo, broadcaster (DWBL & DWIZ; Bandera Pilipino), was killed in Quezon City on October 31. The motive is unclear.

=== 2016 ===
- Elvis Ordaniza, dxWO FM, died on February 16.
- Alex Balcoba, People's Brigada, died on May 27.

Two cases in the first six months of Duterte administration were recorded by the NUJP.

- Apolinario Suan Jr. worked for Real FM, and was a former president of the Barangay Chairmen of Bislig and provincial board member. He was killed in Bislig, Surigao del Sur. The motive is inconclusive. He had been critical of the mayor.
- Larry Que of Catanduanes News Now periodical, was murdered in December in Virac, Catanduanes. He had reported on drug proliferation in Catanduanes. The case was confirmed to be work-related. A resolution from the Department of Justice was issued, dismissing the murder complaint against five individuals for lack of evidence. In February 2019, the provincial police turned over the investigation to a regional unit of the Criminal Investigation and Detection Group.

=== 2017 ===
Six deaths, all recorded by the NUJP, were also cited in a 2018 report by Vera Files. Three of them are confirmed work-related (That of Lozada is only considered the same by the PTFoMS):

- Joaquin Briones of Remate periodical, was murdered on March 13 in Milagros, Masbate. Four suspects were arrested for the killing. The motive was believed to be either local politics, which he had reported, or a personal grudge.
- Leonardo "Leo" Diaz of Sapol News Bulletin periodical, who worked in Balita and Radio Mindanao Network, was murdered on August 7 in President Quirino, Sultan Kudarat. He had reported on local corruption. According to the provincial police, the killing was possibly due to his personal affairs and activities. An arrest warrant was issued by the Tacurong RTC against one of the two accused.
- Christopher "Chris" Iban Lozada of DXBF–Prime Broadcasting Network, was murdered on October 24 in Bislig, Surigao del Sur. He had reported local politics and corruption. By late 2019, suspects were indicted for the cases of murder and frustrated murder. The case is pending in court as of early 2020.

Two others are confirmed non-work-related:

- Mario Contaoi, was a former reporter for DZNS Radyo Totoo and university professor. He was killed on January 6 in Magsingal, Ilocos Sur. He had reported local politics and environmental issues before he left the station in early 2016. A possible motive for the killing was a personal grudge.
- Rudy Alicaway, program host at DXPB-fm Radyo ng Bayan, incumbent barangay kagawad, was shot and killed on August 6 in Molave, Zamboanga del Sur. The motive was said to be most likely personal, as he was linked in the death of a barangay chairman.

The motive of another case is reportedly inconclusive by mid-2018:

- Marlon Muyco was a municipal administrative assistant in M'lang and, according to the police, a frequent guest in a program on DXND Radyo Bida Kidapawan. He was killed in February in M'lang, Cotabato.

Other non-work-related cases include:

- Michael Marasigan was a retired journalist: a former reporter and editor of BusinessWorld, independent producer for the Living Asia Channel, and public relations person. With his brother, he died when attacked by two unknown motorcycle-riding gunmen in San Juan on August 3. The case was endorsed for investigation by early 2020.
- Alexi Bolongaita, 89.1 Power FM disc jockey, was shot dead inside her home at Cebu City on September 21. A suspect, who was arrested in a hospital a few hours later, admitted to the crime and was charged with robbery and homicide and was arraigned in court. The case was classified as non-work-related.

=== 2018 ===
NUJP recorded four of those listed. The cases of Denora and Llana are considered work-related by the PTFoMS; that of Sestoso is confirmed the same by another source.

- Edmund Sestoso, anchorman of DYGB-FM Power 91 Dumaguete, was riding a pedicab on April 30 in Dumaguete when gunmen riding in tandem opened fire at him. He was in critical condition until his death in a hospital on May 1. He had reported local issues. At least three witnesses identified the two suspects, including the gunman. They said said they introduced themselves as NPA members, and planned the killing as Sestoso was alleged to be responsible for framing another suspect, an NPA commander and their uncle, who had been arrested in 2014 in Tanjay. Murder charges were filed twice in 2018 against the three. The first, supported by various evidence, was withdrawn by Sestoso's widow; the second was dismissed for lack of evidence. One of the suspects, Richard Bustamante Jr., died in a shooting incident in La Libertad later that year; another was wounded. Police investigators sought a reopening of the case.
- Carlos Matas (volunteer broadcaster of DXCA-fm; retired soldier), died on the spot on May 12 in Labangan, Zamboanga del Sur when was ambushed by gunmen while riding on his way home to Pagadian. Later in the afternoon, an operation was conducted by joint law enforcement personnel, with three suspects, as well as a policeman, were killed; another suspect was wounded. Personal motive was reportedly the reason. Three more suspects remain at large by early 2020.
- Dennis Denora was publisher-editor of the weekly Trends and Times (Panabo) and DNPRC president. He was shot dead by motorcycle-riding assailants on June 7 in Panabo, Davao del Norte in what was suspected to be a politically motivated murder. He used to write a column for People's Daily Forum and Peryodiko Davao prior to setting up his own publication. A murder complaint and information were filed against a suspect and his unidentified companions. The case is pending in court by early 2020.
- Joey Llana, Zoom Radio Legazpi, was declared dead two hours after being shot while on his way to work in Daraga, Albay on July 20. In 2019, an information for murder was filed against a suspect. The case was raffled at the Legazpi RTC. The case is pending in court.
- Gabriel Alburo was an announcer of DYJL-fm Like Radio Guihulngan and candidate for councilor in Guihulngan, Negros Oriental. He was shot to death on December 28 by two unidentified gunmen riding in tandem while on his way home from the La Libertad cockpit arena. It was reported that the victim had an argument with a betting rival because of their bets. The investigation is ongoing.

Non-work-related cases include:

- Jessie M. Cano was an administrative aide at the government-owned DXSO Radyo Pilipinas Marawi and Army Reservist. He was shot dead by unknown assailants as he arrived home in a village inside the Mindanao State University Campus in Marawi, Lanao del Sur on June 23. Several possible angles were seen, including his work with the military, making him a possible target of Islamic State sympathizers.
- Manny Lacsamana was a contributor to the regional monthly The Media Messenger, chairman of the board of a provincial chapter of the Central Luzon Media Association, and businessman and property developer. He was shot by unidentified motorcycle-riding gunmen, and died upon arrival in a hospital in Cabanatuan on June 23. The murder was reportedly related to his work as a property developer and occurred over quarrying issues in Nueva Ecija.
- Julius Barellano was a volunteer reporter for 101.5 Radyo Bandera Sweet FM Bacolod, disc jockey at Brigada News FM San Carlos, Negros Occidental, as well as chairman of a local chapter of the National Federation of Sugarcane Workers in San Carlos. He died on June 27 after being shot by one of two unknown motorcycle-riding assailants in front of his house in San Carlos while leaving. A personal grudge was revealed as the motive because of an argument between the victim and suspect.
- Nelvie Yu, a reporter at 101.7 Spirit FM Baler, Aurora, was found dead in her residence in Dingalan, Aurora on August 4. Her husband was considered a person of interest as she allegedly had an argument with him on the night before.
- Celso Amo, was a Bicol correspondent of The Philippine Star, Philippine News Agency stringer, also worked for the defunct Philippine Journal; editor-in-chief of government publication The Windows; and former regional information officer of the Philippine Information Agency. He was stabbed to death at a basketball court in Daraga, Albay on November 11 following an argument. Adam Johnson Abanes, charged with homicide, later pleaded guilty of death by tumultuous affray through the plea bargain and was sentenced to eight years in prison by the Legazpi RTC in 2021.

=== 2019 ===
NUJP recorded three killings: Eduardo Dizon, Dindo Generoso, and Benjie Caballero.

- John Michael Decano was a part-time news correspondent, announcer of DWPY Pasalingaya FM in Sorsogon, and beautician. He was found dead on January 9 inside a parlor in Sorsogon City. His death in what appeared as robbery with homicide is not work-related.
- Francisco Patindol was a DXJM-FM Butuan daily program blocktime commentator, and former program director of its sister station DXCO-AM Opol, Misamis Oriental, as well as local coordinator of the Abante Mindanao partylist. On April 20, he was stabbed by a drunk jeepney dispatcher who had got into an argument with him and his companion outside a photocopying center in Butuan; he walked to a nearby hospital where he later died.
- Eduardo Dizon, station manager and host at Brigada News FM Kidapawan station, was shot dead by motorcycle-riding gunmen while driving home on July 10 in Kidapawan, Cotabato. He was critical of the Kapa investment scam in his commentaries over his program, which was later said as the motive for the killing. A suspect-turned-eyewitness identified a local Kapa leader, who was also a local broadcaster, as the organizer. In late 2019, three other suspects were indicted for the murder in the Kidapawan RTC. Since 2021, the case was heard by the Davao City RTC which, in March 2024, acquitted one of the suspects, also a broadcaster of Radyo Natin FM Kidapawan. The suspected gunman was arrested in April 2024, while the rest remain at large. The venue for the trial was moved to Quezon City RTC through a July 2024 resolution by the Supreme Court.
- Dindo Generoso, DYEM-FM Bai Radio, died in November in Dumaguete. Charges were filed; the case is pending in court.
- Benjie Caballero, Radyo ni Juan, died in Tacurong, Sultan Kudarat.

== 2020s ==
=== 2020 ===
- Cornelio Pepino, Original Energy 93.7 FM, was murdered in May in Dumaguete.
- Jobert Bercasio, Balangibog, was murdered on September 14 in Sorsogon City.
- Virgilio Maganes, DWPR and Northern Watch; was murdered on November 10 in Villasis, Pangasinan. He was shot in a prior incident in 2016.
- Ronnie Villamor, Dos Kantos Balita, was gunned down on Nov 14 in Milagros, Masbate in an alleged encounter as authorities claimed. His colleagues denied the allegation.

=== 2021 ===
A statement from the Senate cited five journalists who were killed that year. The International Federation of Journalists (IFJ) documented the cases of Cortes, Dinoy and Malabanan.

- John Heredia, journalist-turned-politician, was killed by assassins on a motorcycle on May 2 in Pilar, Capiz.
- Yentez Quintoy was slain by assassins on a motorcycle on June 4 in General Santos City.
- Renante "Rey" Cortes, commentator at DYRB in Cebu City, was pronounced dead at a hospital 45 minutes after being shot by a gunman driving a motorcycle, while leaving the radio station where he finished his program's July 22 broadcast. He was critical of the local elite instigating arguments with politicians. In 2006, Cortes reportedly survived a previous murder attempt.
- Orlando "Dondon" Dinoy, 43, based in Davao del Sur, reporter for online site NewsLine Philippines and block time anchor-commentator for an Energy FM station, died instantly on October 30 after being shot inside a makeshift recording booth by an assailant who forcibly entered his apartment in Bansalan. He tackled illegal gambling operations in the province prior to his death. His death was believed non-work-related with three possible motives, including personal grudge, being investigated. The identified, suspected gunman was later charged with murder; but remains at large.
- Jesus "Jess" Y. Malabanan, 58, was declared dead on arrival at a private hospital in Calbayog, Samar, on December 8 after being shot at the head inside a store at his residence. Two assailants on a motorcycle who barged in his home, including the gunman, escaped. Land dispute was initially looked as motive. Malabanan, an independent journalist based in Angeles City and served for over 30 years, was the Pampanga correspondent for Bandera, Manila Standard, and The Manila Times; and contributor for Reuters, which he also helped mostly in producing its coverage and in investigating the drug war of President Duterte that won the Pulitzer Prize for International Reporting in 2018. He went into hiding in Samar due to threats he had received in his hometown three years prior to his death.

=== 2022 ===
Six killings, all against radio journalists, took place. The murders of Estrada, Gempesaw, Blanco and Mabasa are unsolved as of August 2023, according to CPJ. Meanwhile, the International Federation of Journalists documented four of these cases; CMFR documented the cases of Blanco and Mabasa.

- Jaynard Angeles was killed on January 12.
- Audrey Estrada was killed in Lanao del Norte on March 17.
- Jhannah Villegas (Sagad & Bugso, Radyo Ukay and Energy FM 106.7) was shot dead by unidentified assailants at her home in Maguindanao on April 15. She had reportedly received threats due to her criticisms.
- Federico "Ding" Gempesaw, political commentator and daily blocktime program host at Radyo Natin 106.3 FM in Cagayan de Oro, died immediately after being shot by two masked men in front of his residence on June 29. An arrest warrant was later issued by the Misamis Oriental RTC Branch 39 against the suspects; the alleged gunman, was arrested by the police on October 31, 2023; another is still at large.
- Renato "Rey" Blanco, broadcaster for Power 102.1 DYRY RFM in Mabinay, Negros Oriental, was declared dead on arrival in a local hospital in the town after being stabbed in an altercation at a house on September 18. The killing was considered by the NUJP as work-related.
- Percival "Percy Lapid" Mabasa, commentator and program host at DWBL 1242, was shot dead by two unidentified armed assailants outside a village in Las Piñas on October 3. A critic of the national government, he was known for criticizing political issues, particularly red-tagging and harassment against a Manila judge. Eleven people were later indicted as principals, including two former Bureau of Corrections officials who are the alleged organizers of the killing; alleged middleman Jun Villamor; deputy security officer Ricardo Zulueta, who reportedly died in March 2024; and chief Gerald Bantag, who is still at large. Through plea bargaining, Joel Escorial, the self-confessed gunman who claimed that the plot came from the New Bilibid Prison, as well as four of the five inmates, later pleaded guilty and were given lower prison sentences by the RTC.

=== 2023 ===
Only that of Bunduquin was documented by CMFR.

The following are based on media reports:

- Cresenciano Bunduquin, 50, program host at DWXR-fm Kalahi Radio, was killed by two motorcycle-riding perpetrators outside his home in Calapan, Oriental Mindoro on May 31. One of the suspects died after being hit by a vehicle while fleeing; another, an alleged gunman, was taken into custody of the NBI–National Capital Region prior to his arrest in July. The case was filed before the Calapan RTC Branch 39.
- Mohammad Hessam Midtimbang, 32, blocktime program host at Gabay Radio 97.7 FM, an Islamic preacher and member of the Bangsamoro Darul Ifta', was killed by a gunman in Cotabato City on August 21. PTFoMS clarified later that he was not a journalist but an Islamic scholar (ustadz) invited by the station as guest. Possible motives being investigated are politics and personal issues.
- Juan Jumalon, 57, broadcaster at Gold FM 94.7 Calamba, was killed by two gunmen who entered his home-based radio booth in Calamba, Misamis Occidental, on November 5, while he was doing a livestream. Four possible motives being investigated include a land dispute. The suspected gunman was arrested in early 2024 in Dipolog, Zamboanga del Norte; his two alleged accomplices had been arrested earlier in Sapang Dalaga. In March 2025, the Calamba RTC dismissed the murder charges and acquitted all suspects citing failure to prove their guilt beyond reasonable doubt.

=== 2024 ===
That of Rodriguez—the year's lone case—while her death has not been officially recognized as work-related, was documented by CMFR. Meanwhile, no work-related killings were reported, for the first time in two decades according to the CPJ; since 1985 according to RSF.

The following is based on media reports:

- Maria Vilma Rodriguez, 56, was a program anchor at 105.9 eMedia, and former volunteer reporter at Brigada News FM, as well as a village secretary. She was fatally shot by her nephew outside a store near her home in Zamboanga City on October 22. The police, clarifying that it is not work-related, said that the motive was allegedly a land dispute. The suspect was apprehended the next day.

=== 2025 ===
Three of the killings were documented by IFJ. Only that of Dayang was documented by CMFR.

The following is based on media reports:

- Juan "Johnny" Dayang, 89, was former president of the Publishers Association of the Philippines, Inc., and mayor of Kalibo, Aklan, during the presidency of Corazon Aquino. He was shot by an unknown gunman inside his residence on April 29. Dayang was also a columnist for Balita and Tempo; founding president of the Federation of Provincial Press Clubs of the Philippines; former director of the National Press Club; former publisher of Philippine Graphic magazine and the now defunct Leader Publishing Company (Headline Manila and Headline Extra dailies); and secretary of the Catholic Mass Media Awards.
- Ali Macalintal, a trans woman and former radio broadcaster for RPN-DXDX, was shot dead at an acupuncture clinic in General Santos on June 23. She was also a former deputy secretary general of the human rights group Karapatan in Soccsksargen and a member of political organizations Makabayan, Bagong Alyansang Makabayan, and Bayan Muna who had previously been accused and detained for alleged involvement in a bombing before being cleared.
- Erwin "Boy Pana" L. Segovia, 63, commentator at DXCB 98.5 in Bislig, Surigao del Sur, was fatally shot by two unidentified gunmen on a motorcycle. He was shot while on his way home aboard his motorbike shortly after his July 21 morning program.
- Noel Bellen Samar, 54, reporter for Kadunong Internet TV and DWIZ News FM 92.3 South Luzon, was ambushed by an unidentified gunman along a highway in Guinobatan, Albay, on October 20, and died at the Bicol Regional Hospital and Medical Center in Legazpi the next day.
- Gerry S. Campos was stabbed to death on December 6, while walking near a gasoline station in Marihatag, Surigao del Sur. The suspect was later apprehended by the police in a pursuit operation. A radio anchor, he was the director of Radio Mindanao Network and the manager of Radyo Serbato, both outlets are based in Butuan, prior to being elected municipal councilor in May.

=== 2026 ===
The following are based on media reports:

- Julito "Jaz" D. Calo, 49, program host at 88.3 DNN News FM in Himamaylan, Negros Occidental, was fatally shot by an assassin aboard an SUV in front of his residence in La Castellana on March 20.
- RJ Nichole Ledesma, 30, community journalist who had been a writer and editor of Paghimutad Negros Island Alternative Media and coordinator of the Altermidya Network in the Negros Island Region, was among 19 people killed in an operation by the Philippine Army against suspected New People's Army rebels in Toboso, Negros Occidental, on April 19, reportedly while doing community work and reporting on the renewable energy projects on farming communities. He is considered a journalist by the NUJP; his career started when he was an editor-in-chief of a student publication in the University of St. La Salle in Bacolod.
- Nestor "Teting" Micator, 45, news anchor and commentator for D'Empire Radio in Pikit, Cotabato, and a member of Lupong Pambarangay, was fatally shot on May 21 in an attack in front of the village hall of Fort Pikit, Malidegao, Special Geographic Area of the Bangsamoro, while he, along with his wife, was about to go home. The gunman, along with an accomplice, fled aboard a motorbike.
- Dennis D. Pido, 56, a Cotabato City resident and a radio technician for the Catholic-owned Notre Dame Broadcasting Corporation for over 30 years, was shot by assailants on a motorcycle along the Davao–Cotabato Road in Sultan Kudarat, Maguindanao del Norte, on July 14 while on his way to his shift at DXMS-AM Radyo Bida. He later died despite being rushed to the Cotabato Sanitarium and General Hospital.
- Adrian "Golden Boy" Loterte, a resident of Daraga, Albay, a program anchor of online platform RBN News Television and blocktimer of a Home Radio station (formerly DWIZ Legazpi) in Legazpi, was shot by one of two assassins on October 12 while visiting his bakery, and later died in a hospital.

==== Died during coverage ====
- Armelito "Itoh" Son, 54, photojournalist for daily tabloid Saksi, collapsed while covering activities during the Feast of the Black Nazarene at the Quirino Grandstand in Manila, and was found unconscious near a Manila Police District station. He was rushed to Gat Andres Bonifacio Medical Center, but was eventually pronounced dead.

== See also ==
- Human rights in the Philippines (section Press freedom)
- Extrajudicial killings and forced disappearances in the Philippines
- Political killings in the Philippines (2001-2010)
- List of assassinations in the Philippines
