= Richard Nadjid =

- Born: ca. 1979
- Died: May 4, 2014; Bongao, Tawi-Tawi, Philippines
- Cause of death: Gun shot
- Other name: DJ Troy
- Occupation: Journalist
- Employer(s): DxNN Power Myx FM Station & dxGD 675 AM
- Known for: Journalism, morning news and public affairs
- Spouse: Wife
- Children: 5 children

Richard Nadjid, also known as DJ Troy (c. 1979 – May 4, 2014), was a Filipino journalist for dxGD 675 AM in Bongao, Tawi-Tawi, Philippines.

== Personal ==
Richard Nadjid was a married 35 year old, father of five children.

== Career ==
Richard Nadjid worked as a reporter for almost seven years for DxGD 675 AM before transferring to DxNN where he then managed the station in Bongao. At DxNN Power Myx FM Station he provided morning news and public affairs programs. Richard Nadjid also provided his time to the local Philippine Drug Enforcement Agency to act as a witness to drug busts. Philippine laws mandates that at least one media practitioner act as a witness in drug bust inventories.

== Death ==
The location of Bongao is shown within the Philippines and relative to the capital Manila.

Richard Nadjid was shot near his house while walking on from a local basketball game. Nadjid was pronounced dead before making it to the hospital. No one witnessed the shooting and the police only found four empty bullet shells. It is speculated that at least two men on a motorcycle are responsible.

Mayor Jasper Que of this town has claimed that the May 4 slaying of broadcaster Richard Nadjid as an off-shoot of a love triangle. He said, "The findings of our police is love triangle. There are women involved and we don’t want to talk about it. We are not pursuing that issue anymore for the sake of the family."

The killing drew ire and condemnation from Malacañang today. Presidential Communications Operations Office Secretary Herminio Coloma Jr. said in a text message to reporters: The Philippine National Police has been ordered to investigate, arrest and charge those suspected perpetrators.

== Context ==
Tawi-Tawi is an island province of the Philippines located in the autonomous region in Muslim Mindanao. The Philippines remained one of the deadliest countries in the world for journalists, with more work-related killings between 1992 and mid-2014 than any country except Iraq. Nadjid is the second member of the Tawi-Tawi's media community killed and the 27th under the Aquino Administration.

== Impact ==
Richard is the 27th journalist killed under the administration of President Benigno Aquino. The deaths of Nadjid will shed doubt on President Aquino's ability to stop the violence, after his announcement in April that a special committee would be formed to counter extrajudicial killings.

== Reactions ==
NUJP said it is "disturbing" that Tawi-Tawi provincial police director Senior Supt. Joselito Salido has "immediately and baselessly dismissed the possibility of Nadjid’s murder being work-related”. The group took exception to Salido's calling the victim "just one disc jockey, a person that plays popular music on FM radio station," and "not a journalist." The NUJP has slammed President Aquino for giving a blanket insinuation that these murders were prodded by motives other than the victims work.

A report from GMA News said Presidential Spokesperson Herminio Coloma Jr. had sent a text message to reporters saying, "We condemn the killing of Mr. Richard (Nadjid). We have already ordered the police to identify, arrest, and hold accountable, those involved with the crime."

The Center for Community Journalism and Development, a media development organization, also condemned the killing saying, "CCJD joins other voices in calling for an end to the insidious and continuing attacks to silence the press. The irony of the latest killing should not be missed and should instead serve as a reminder that in this country where democracy and the rule of law are supposedly thriving, there is a need for continuing vigilance and resistance against the erosion of press freedom."

== See also ==
- List of journalists killed in the Philippines
