= Joselito Agustin =

Filipino journalist (1972/73–2010)

- Born: Joselito Agustin; 1972-73
- Died: June 16, 2010; Bacarra, Philippines
- Occupation: Radio Journalist
- Children: Two

Joselito Agustin (1972-73 – June 16, 2010), also known as Aksyon Lito, was a Filipino journalist who worked for the DZJC radio station at Baccara, Ilocos Norte, on the island of Luzon, Philippines. He was an important journalist in the local community and often showed no fear of political flak and was killed.

Augustin's death occurred within days of two other murders of Filipino journalists. Just one day before Augustin, Desidario Camangyan who did political reports for Sunrise FM in Mati, Davao Oriental, was killed. Later that week Nestor Bedolido, of the Kastigador, which was a weekly, was killed.

== Death ==
Joselito Agustin was shot four times by two different gunmen on his way home from work on the night of June 15, 2010. The reason why it happened is still somewhat unknown according to local officials. What was known by the public is that Agustin did bash politicians in the area and particularly against mayoral candidates who were campaigning for office positions. Later details revealed that Newly elected Vice Mayor Pacific Velasco, an aide and two others were charged with murder by police. The reasoning behind killing Agustin was because he was broadcasting on-air criticizing Velasco and putting his election efforts in jeopardy.

== Context ==
Baccara, is one of many municipalities in the province of Ilocos Norte, Philippines. Journalist Joselito Agustin did speak his political views publicly often, causing a backlash from politicians.

== Impact ==
Joselito Agustin was a voice in the community of Bacarra. The topics he discussed on air such as local election irregularities were important because he called out politicians that were trying or did corrupt the system.

== Reactions ==
Irina Bokova, the director general of UNESCO, said about his killing: “This crime must be investigated and its perpetrators brought to justice. This is essential to put an end to the shocking number of attacks on professionals assassinated for exercising the basic human right of free speech and enabling the public to engage in informed debate.” Jesus Versoza, the Philippine chief of police, ordered the creation of a task force to look into the two killings this week, said Leonardo Espina, a police spokesman. He wants these cases prioritized and solved soon."

Joselito Agustin's death was just one of many in June 2010 in the Philippines as deaths also occurred the previous two days as well. The ongoing murder problem in the Philippines got worse with the newly elected president.

== Career ==
Joselito Agustin was a radio journalist at local station DZJC Radio Station in Bacarra, Philippines. He was often known for his advocacy against corruption in local government units.

== See also ==
- List of journalists killed under the Arroyo administration
