= Maurito Lim =

Filipino journalist

- Born: c. 1944; Philippines
- Died: February 14, 2015; Tagbilaran City, Bohol Providence
- Cause of death: Gun shot
- Other name: Chairman Mau
- Occupation: Journalist
- Years active: 45 years
- Organization: dyRD Radio
- Known for: Broadcaster for "Chairman Mao on Board"
- Spouse: Nunilone Lim
- Family: 2 daughters

Maurito Lim, also known as Chairman Mau (c. 1944 – February 14, 2015), a Filipino journalist for the DYRD-AM radio station in Tagbilaran, Bohol, Philippines, was killed outside of his radio station. According to officials, Lim has been known for criticizing local officials allegedly involved in the illegal drug trade, which could be the cause of his death.

== Personal ==
At one point in his life, Maurito Lim used to work as an engineer for the National Power Corporation but then switched jobs to teach at the University of Bohol. He and his wife, Nunilone Lim, were married for 44 years and had two daughters.

== Career ==
He first started broadcasting in the 1970s when he hosted a program called "Kuya Rito." Kuya Rito was a public service program that aired on the radio station DYTR-AM, which is also in Bohol. He stopped doing the program in the 1980s when he decided to focus on his teaching career. In 2000, Lim bought airtime every Sunday from between 8 p.m. to 9 p.m. for another program, called "Harana," which was broadcast on the radio station DYRD-AM. About 10 years later, Lim started another program, called "Chairman Mao on Board."

Lim, also bought a daily 30-minute segment on his radio station at dyRD called “Lactopafi,” in which he advertised his health supplement that he sold outside of his radio and journalism career.

== Death ==
Tagbilaran City is located within Philippines relative to the capital Manila.

On Valentine's Day, Saturday, February 14, 2015, Lim arrived for his 11:00 a.m. program. His body was found outside of his Isuzu Crosswind SUV with gun shot wound from a .45 caliber pistol round in the head outside DYRD radio station on B. Inting Street in Tagbilaran City. At 10:45 a.m., a gunman, who could not be identified because his face was covered by a ball cap, rode a motorcycle with a license plate that was also unable to be read by security footage, shot Lim as we was getting out of his car outside of the radio station dyRD. He was hit on the left jaw with the bullet exiting his right ear. He was then rushed to the Governor Celestino Gallares Memorial Hospital right across the street from the radio station, only to be pronounced dead at 1:15 p.m. Lim's wife said she was not aware if there were any threats against Lim. According to her, Lim has stayed neutral on his station about his topic on illegal drug trade.

=== Investigation ===
The National Union of Journalists of the Philippines told the government that they need to act quickly in this investigation in finding Lim's killer. Both the NUJP and Senator Aquilino Pimentel III condemned the murder of Lim. The NUJP called for police to act on the killings that have happened within a short period of time and put effort towards finding, and arresting the killers. Senator Pimentel called for the Senate to conduct hearings on the violence against journalists. The police force created the Task Force Mao to investigate Lim's murder, and signs of his death pointed out that the gunman was a "professional hitman". They found a circuit television camera (CCTV) that was installed nearby the radio station. Until the number reaches zero, the President's administration said it would push to stop the attacks that happen to members of the press.

According to reports from two newspaper weeklies, police identified Jovane Celocia Orenia, who was arrested in a drug bust on March 5, 2015, as a possible suspect in the killing of Lim. The evidence later revealed against the suspect was a matching .45 pistol and the identification of a witness. Police suspect the motive behind Lim's murder was a land deal in which he was involved. The initial release of the information about the suspect by the two newspapers had not yet been approved by the police. The suspect had been under surveillance for two weeks prior to the drug bust.

== Context ==
Lim was known for his strong observations against politicians. In Lim's radio segment, "Chairman Mao," he brought up a topic for discussion about the involvement of some politicians in illegal drugs and had been known for criticizing local officials supposedly involved in the trade.

== Impact ==
Lim was the second journalist to be killed in Bohol in the last 6 years, the 34th journalist to be killed since President Benigno Aquino III and the 172nd killing of a journalist since 1986.

== Reactions ==
Irina Bokova, director-general of UNESCO, said, "I condemn the murder of Maurito Lim. This crime needs to be thoroughly investigated for its perpetrators to be brought to justice. Impunity for such crimes increases the vulnerability of all journalists and encourages self-censorship. The authorities must provide the media with as safe an environment as possible to ensure the public’s right to be kept informed."

The International Federation of Journalists and National Union of Journalists of the Philippines asked the government to take action right away in finding the gunman who shot and killed Lim. Jane Worthington, acting director from the IFJ-Asia Pacific, said, "The killing of Lim is a despicable and cowardly act of the highest order." And a statement from the National Union of Journalists of the Philippines said, "We have run out of words of condemnation in the face of the murder of yet another colleague." The IFJ and NUJP both expressed outrage at the neglect of safety and security issues in the Philippines. Mike Dobbie, a delegate of IFJ missions, said, “We need determined efforts by law enforcement agencies to seek out not only the gunmen responsible but also those who ordered this outrage and who employed the shooter. The judicial system must move to a swift resolution. To do less than these measures is to allow impunity to continue and flourish."

His wife said, "He was very friendly. I had never heard someone get angry at him. I am still in shock over what happened. I am calling on the authorities to solve the killing of my husband."

== See also ==
- List of journalists killed under the Arroyo administration
