= Albert Que =

Filipino politician

Albert Tan Que, Al Haj (died 2010s) was a Filipino politician who was mayor of Bongao, Tawi-Tawi from 2001 until 2010. He was the father of current Bongao mayor Jasper Shia Que. In 2007 he was re-elected.
