= Desidario Camangyan =

Filipino radio journalist (1952–2010)

- Born: 1952
- Died: June 14, 2010 (aged 57–58); Manay, Davao Oriental, Philippines
- Other name: "Jessie"
- Occupation: Radio journalist
- Partner: Married
- Children: One

Desidario Camangyan (1952 – June 14, 2010), also called "Jessie", was a radio journalist for Sunrise FM in Mati City in the southern Philippines. He was slain onstage in Manay, Davao Oriental, Mindanao, while hosting a singing contest.

He was the first of three political murders within the span of a week. One day after Camangyan, radio journalist Joselito Agustin of Bacarra was killed at a music event. Later that week print reporter Nestor Bedolido, of the Kastigador, was killed.

== Death ==
Camangyan was acting as the host of an amateur singing contest. At around 10:30 p.m., he was shot a single time in the head at close range by a lone gunman, who then escaped on foot. Camangyan died on stage in front of the audience, including his wife and six-year-old son.

== Context ==
Camangyan hosted a talk radio program on Sunrise FM, where he often gave scathing commentary on political corruption and deforestation. In addition to vocalizing his positions on the illegal logging industry, Camangyan also campaigned for the incumbent mayor of Mati shortly before his death. According to Center for Media Freedom and Responsibility, Camangyan, along with his two co-hosts, would regularly criticize corrupt officials and had received threats in regard to this practice.

Police announced at the time of his death that they were investigating whether or not the assassination was related to Camangyan's profession.

Camangyn is just one of several journalists killed in the Philippines - listed by the Committee to Protect Journalists as one of the most dangerous regions for journalists and ranked third on its 2010 Impunity Index. According to Forbidden Stories Desidario Camangyan was 1 of 13 reporters investigating environmental issues that were killed between 2009 and 2019.

== Reactions ==
The death of Camangyan and two other journalists prompted calls for immediate action, according to the Committee to Protect Journalists. On June 21, 2010, charges were filed against two suspects, a police officer named Dennis Jess Lumikid and a local official named Romeo Antoling who had asked Camangyan to host the singing competition. Lumikid would eventually be indicted for the crime, but charges were dropped against Antoling when there was not enough evidence to indict him. Several members of the June 14 audience - Camagyan's wife included - helped police identify the gunman.

== See also ==
- List of journalists killed under the Arroyo administration
