= DWIL =

Radio station in Laoag, Philippines

Love Radio Laoag (DWIL)
- Laoag; Philippines
- Broadcast area: Ilocos Norte and surrounding areas
- Frequency: 90.7 MHz
- Branding: 90.7 Love Radio

Programming
- Languages: Ilocano, Filipino
- Format: Pop MOR, OPM
- Network: Love Radio

Ownership
- Owner: MBC Media Group
- Sister stations: Aksyon Radyo Laoag, DZRH Laoag

History
- First air date: January 4, 1982
- Call sign meaning: Ilocos

Technical information
- Licensing authority: NTC
- Power: 5,000 watts

Links
- Webcast: Listen Live
- Website: Love Radio Laoag

DWIL (90.7 FM), broadcasting as 90.7 Love Radio, is a radio station owned and operated by MBC Media Group. The station's studio and transmitter are located at the 6/F Hotel Asuncion Bldg., J.P. Rizal cor. Guerrero St., Brgy. Sta. Marcela, Laoag.
