= Teodoro Escanilla =

Filipino blocktimer and politician

- Born: 1958 or 1959; Sorsogon, Philippines
- Died: August 27, 2015 (aged 56); Barcelona, Sorsogon, Philippines
- Cause of death: Gunshot wounds
- Other name: Tio Todoy
- Occupations: Political party and human rights worker and journalist
- Employer: Radio dzMS
- Organization: Karapatan
- Known for: his leftist political activity and radio commentary
- Political party: Anakpawis

Teodoro Escanilla, also known as Tio Todoy, (1958 or 1959 – August 27, 2015), was a Filipino blocktimer who hosted the public affairs commentary show Pamana ng Lahi (lit. A Race's Legacy) for the Radio dzMS radio station, an affiliate of the PBN Broadcasting Network, in Sorsogon City, Sorsogon, Philippines. Escanilla was also involved in politics and human rights in Sorsogan and served as both chair of the political party Anakpawis and spokesperson for the human rights group Karapatan.

== Career ==
Teodoro Escanilla was a well-known human rights leader in the Sorsogon province. He was the spokesperson for the human rights group Karapatan, Sorsogon. He was also the chair of the local Anakpawis political party, which is a party affiliated with the Kilusang Mayo Uno union that advocates labor issues on behalf of peasants and workers.

In addition, Tio Todoy was a block timer for Radio dzMS in Sorsogon City for about 10 years before his death. He used his show Pamana ng Lahi to criticize the military and bring public attention to human rights abuses. Sympathizers had warned him that he was on the military's "hit list" because of the work he did on his radio show, but Escanilla continued to broadcast his human rights advocacy. In 2014, the military detained a person and offered him money to kill Escanilla, according to those who warned him.

== Death ==
Around six men on three motorcycles arrived at Teodoro Escanilla's family compound in Tadon village, Barcelona town, Sorsogon province, shortly before midnight on Wednesday, August 19, 2015, as Escanilla and his wife were entertaining a guest. He went to see what the men wanted and they shot him eight times. Five of the shots were from an M-16 rifle and the other three were from a .45 caliber pistol. His wife screamed at the attackers but could not identify them. Escanilla was rushed to the Sorsogon Medical Mission Group Hospital Health Services Cooperative where he died eight days later. The police immediately formed a task force to investigate.

Teodoro Escanilla was 56-years old at the time he was murdered. He was survived by his wife.

== Context ==
Reporters Without Borders ranked the Philippines 141 out of 180 for press freedom and among the most dangerous countries for journalists in 2015. Over 40 other radio "block timers," or radio hosts who buy time from radio stations, had been killed since 2002 by the time Escanilla was murdered. News organizations noted that his murder followed by one day the murder of Gregorio "Loloy" Ybañez, publisher of Kabuhayan News Services. Beside Ybañez and Escanilla, other journalists killed in 2015 include Cosme Maestrado, August 27, and Jose Bernardo, October 31.

== Impact ==
Escanilla was actively involved in radio commentary and human rights, political activity that was critical of the military's anti-insurgency campaign in the Bicol area. It possible that these attacks were the result of the state's military counter-insurgency campaign as documented by Karapatan.

== Reactions ==
A spokesperson for the Malacañang Press Corps issued the statement, "We condemn the killing of Teodoro Escanilla. The authorities will go after the suspects and will bring them to face justice."

The Sorsogon chapter of the National Union of Journalists of the Philippines said, "We ... call on the authorities to get to the bottom of this latest incident which threatens to once again plunge the province into chaos and bring back the dark years of retaliatory killings which have caused the death of several human rights advocates and state agents."

The human rights and political community also had strong reactions to his death:

"Many more Ka Tudoys will spring forth from the ranks of the oppressed masses despite of his killing," said Escanilla's colleague from the human rights organization Karapatan.

Karapatan released the following statement: "We also call on all people to condemn in the strongest term possible this senseless and cold-blooded killing which has no place in a society if it calls itself civilized and democratic... The perpetrators of this killing are as bestial and demonic as their deed which could only be found in military camps and garrisons of a police and Hitlerian state that has no regard to the sanctity of life and respect for the human rights of the people."

== See also ==
- National Democracy Movement (Philippines)
