= DXDS =

Radyo ni Ga (DXDS)
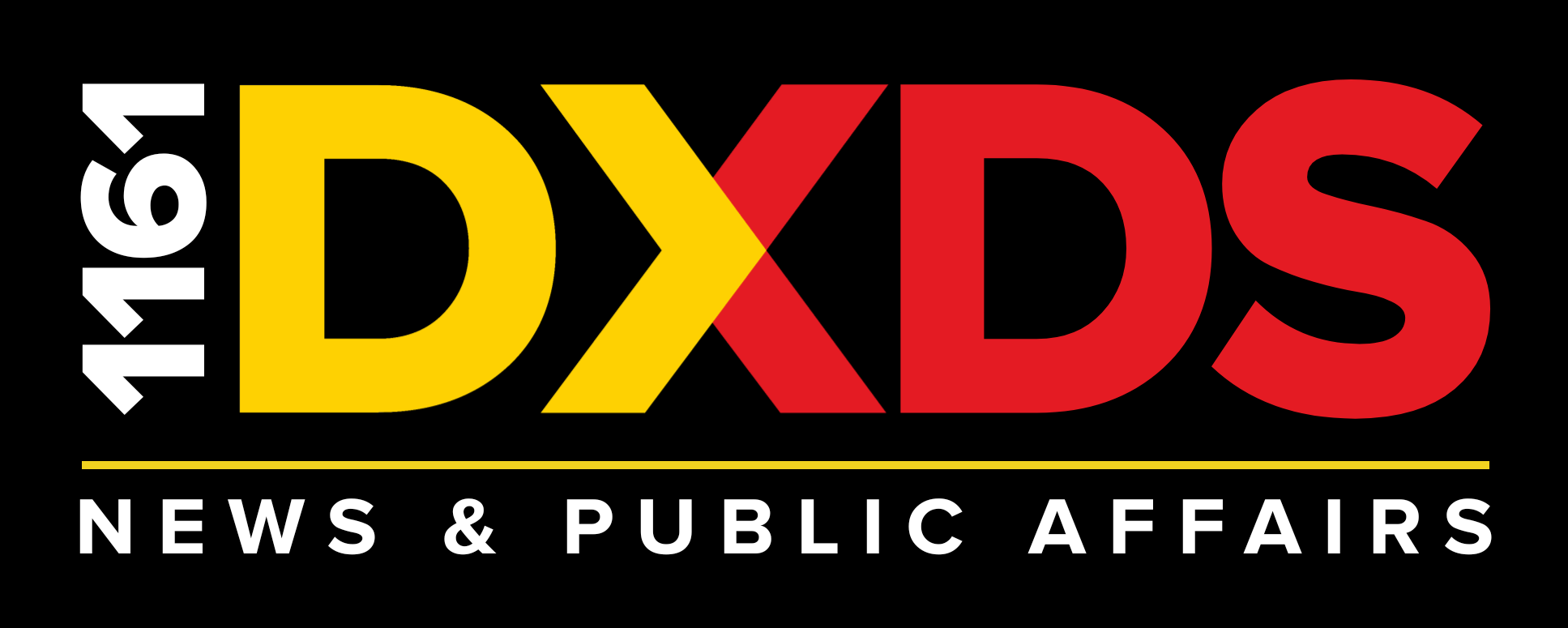
- Digos; Philippines
- Broadcast area: Davao del Sur and surrounding areas
- Frequency: 1161 kHz
- Branding: Radyo ni Ga

Programming
- Languages: Cebuano, Filipino
- Format: News, Public Affairs, Talk

Ownership
- Owner: UM Broadcasting Network

History
- First air date: October 4, 1967
- Former names: Radyo Ukay (2000-2020)
- Former frequencies: 1160 kHz (1967–1978)
- Call sign meaning: Davao del Sur

Technical information
- Licensing authority: NTC
- Power: 5,000 watts (1,000 watts operational)
- ERP: 6,000 watts
- Repeater: DXAY 92.7 MHz

DXDS (1161 AM), broadcasting as Radyo ni Ga, is a radio station owned and operated by UM Broadcasting Network. The station's studio and transmitter are located along Rizal Avenue, Digos.

== History ==
It was formerly known as Radyo Ukay from 2000 to June 14, 2020. On June 15, 2020, management decided to retire the branding as it has run its course. DXDS, along with its other AM stations, started carrying their perspective call letters in their brandings. The yellow highlighted in the "X" of their logos means to move forward.

In August 2025, the station adopted the Radyo ni Ga. Ga is short for pangga, a bisaya term for loved one.
