= DXSF =

- San Francisco; Philippines
- Broadcast area: Eastern Agusan del Sur, parts of Surigao del Sur
- Frequency: 96.1 MHz

Programming
- Format: Silent

Ownership
- Owner: Agusan Communications Foundation

History
- First air date: March 28, 1997
- Last air date: March 10, 2021
- Former names: San Franz Radio
- Call sign meaning: San Francisco

Technical information
- Licensing authority: NTC

DXSF (96.1 FM) was a radio station owned and operated by Agusan Communications Foundation. It was formerly known as San Franz Radio 96.1 from its inception on March 28, 1997 to March 10, 2021, when it went off the air after its franchise expired. Since then, it migrated online as Agusan Digital News Channel.
