= Bantay Radyo =

Philippine radio network

Radyo SIAM
- Type: Radio network
- Country: Philippines

Ownership
- Owner: Sarraga Integrated and Management Corporation

History
- Launch date: 1991
- Former names: Bantay Radyo

Coverage
- Availability: Central Visayas; Misamis Oriental

Links
- Website: http://bantayradyo.page

Radyo SIAM is a Philippine radio network in the Visayas and Mindanao region owned by Sarraga Integrated and Management Corporation (SIAM). Its main headquarters are located in Brgy. Capitol Site, Cebu City, with repeaters located in Bogo and Guihulngan.

== History ==
Bantay Radyo was established in 1991 by Cagayan de Oro–based Sarraga Integrated and Management Corporation, with the leadership of then-provincial Board Member Gigi Sanchez. In 2002, PAFI Techno Resources Corporation took over the network's management. This lasted until mid-2015, when PAFI's contract with SIAM expired.

In 2006, Bantay Radyo expanded to Mindanao with DXIP in Davao, owned by the Southern Broadcasting Network. In 2009, it went off the air for unknown reasons.

On August 1, 2015, Bantay Radyo stations temporarily went off the air due to management issues. Representatives from SIAM confiscated their transmitter equipment. SIAM decided to let CFI Community Cooperative take over the operations of Bantay Radyo once PAFI's contract expired.

In 2024, Bantay Radyo went back on air with the help of Power Radio 97.9 based in Villanueva, Misamis Oriental.

In April 2026, Bantay Radyo was relaunched as Radyo SIAM under the management of Visayas News Network. The current iteration of Bantay Radyo operates as an online radio outlet.

== Radio stations ==
Callsign	Frequency	Power	Location
DYDD	1260 kHz	10 kW	Cebu City
DYHH	864 kHz	10 kW	Bogo
DYZZ	1458 kHz	10 kW	Guihulngan
