= DXKP =

Radio station in the Philippines

Radyo Ronda Pagadian (DXKP)

Pagadian; Philippines
- Broadcast area: Zamboanga del Sur and surrounding areas
- Frequency: 1377 kHz
- Branding: RPN DXKP Radyo Ronda

Programming
- Languages: Cebuano, Filipino
- Format: News, Public Affairs, Talk, Drama
- Network: Radyo Ronda

Ownership
- Owner: Radio Philippines Network

History
- First air date: 1974
- Former frequencies: 1370 kHz (1974–1978)
- Call sign meaning: Kanlaon Pagadian

Technical information
- Licensing authority: NTC
- Power: 1,000 watts

Links
- Webcast: Listen Live
- Website: Official Website

DXKP (1377 AM) Radyo Ronda is a radio station owned and operated by Radio Philippines Network. The station's studios are located along Benigno Aquino St., Pagadian.
