= DXID =

- Pagadian; Philippines
- Broadcast area: Zamboanga del Sur and surrounding areas
- Frequency: 101.5 MHz
- Branding: DXID 101.5

Programming
- Languages: Subanon, Filipino
- Format: Islamic radio

Ownership
- Owner: Association for Islamic Development Service Cooperative

History
- First air date: 1995
- Call sign meaning: Islamic Development

Technical information
- Licensing authority: NTC
- Power: 10,000 watts
- Repeater: 1566 kHz

DXID (1566 AM & 101.5 FM) is a radio station owned and operated by Association for Islamic Development Service Cooperative. The station's studio and FM transmitter are located at AID Comp., Purok Arabic, Brgy. Banale, Pagadian, and its AM transmitter is located in Tukuran. This serves as the community station for the Islam people.
