= DZJC =

Aksyon Radyo Laoag (DZJC)
- Laoag; Philippines
- Broadcast area: Ilocos Norte and surrounding areas
- Frequency: 747 kHz
- Branding: Aksyon Radyo 747

Programming
- Languages: Ilocano, Filipino
- Format: News, Public Affairs, Talk
- Network: Aksyon Radyo

Ownership
- Owner: MBC Media Group; (Cebu Broadcasting Company)
- Sister stations: 90.7 Love Radio, DZRH Laoag

History
- First air date: August 31, 1966
- Former names: DZJC Sunshine City
- Former frequencies: 770 kHz (1968–1978)

Technical information
- Licensing authority: NTC
- Power: 5,000 watts

Links
- Website: Official Website

DZJC (747 AM) Aksyon Radyo is a radio station owned and operated by MBC Media Group through its licensee Cebu Broadcasting Company. The station's studio and offices are located at Elizalde Building, J. P. Rizal St., Saint Joseph District, Brgy. Sto. Tomas, Laoag, and its transmitter is located in Brgy. Sta. Maria, Laoag.
