= DWJJ-AM =

DWJJ
- Cabanatuan; Philippines
- Broadcast area: Nueva Ecija and surrounding areas
- Frequency: 684 kHz
- Branding: DWJJ 684

Programming
- Language: Filipino
- Format: News, Public Affairs, Talk

Ownership
- Owner: Kaissar Broadcasting Network
- Operator: Double J Ad Ventures
- Sister stations: CABTV Channel 16

History
- First air date: December 25, 1999
- Call sign meaning: Julius Cesar "Jay" Vergara

Technical information
- Licensing authority: NTC
- Power: 5,000 watts

Links
- Website: https://www.facebook.com/CabanatuanTV

DWJJ (684 AM) is a radio station owned by Kaissar Broadcasting Network and operated by Double J Ad Ventures, a local media outlet owned by Cabanatuan Vice Mayor Julius Cesar Vergara. The station's studio and transmitter are located at Celcor Compound, Bitas, Cabanatuan.
