= DZRS =

- Sorsogon City; Philippines
- Broadcast area: Sorsogon
- Frequency: 1179 kHz

Programming
- Format: Silent

Ownership
- Owner: Radio Sorsogon Network

History
- First air date: 1982
- Last air date: 2006
- Former frequencies: 1287 kHz (1982–1995)
- Call sign meaning: Radio Sorsogon

Technical information
- Licensing authority: NTC

DZRS (1179 AM) was a radio station owned and operated by Radio Sorsogon Network.

Established in 1982, the station was the second AM station in Sorsogon after DZMS. During its operation, it was located at the now-demolished Don Luis Lee Building, Plaza Bonifacio, Brgy. Sirangan, Sorsogon City. It went off the air in 2006 after its transmitter was knocked down by Typhoon Reming.
