= DWDO =

Heart FM (DWDO)
San Jose; Philippines
- Broadcast area: Southern Mindoro
- Frequency: 102.5 MHz
- Branding: Heart FM 102.5

Programming
- Language: Filipino
- Format: Community radio

Ownership
- Owner: Armed Forces of the Philippines

Technical information
- Licensing authority: NTC
- Power: 1,000 watts
- ERP: 5,000 watts

DWDO (102.5 FM), broadcasting as Heart FM 102.5, is a radio station owned and operated by the Armed Forces of the Philippines through its Civil Affairs Group. The station's studio and transmitter are located at Brgy. 1, San Jose, Occidental Mindoro.
