= DXGD =

Radio station in Bongao, Philippines

- Bongao; Philippines
- Broadcast area: Tawi-Tawi
- Frequency: 549 kHz

Programming
- Format: Silent

Ownership
- Owner: Sulu-Tawi-Tawi Broadcasting Foundation

History
- First air date: 1948
- Last air date: June 2023
- Call sign meaning: Bishop George Dion (co-founder of the Oblates of Notre Dame)

Technical information
- Licensing authority: NTC

DXGD (549 AM) was a radio station owned and operated by Sulu-Tawi-Tawi Broadcasting Foundation, the media arm of the Apostolic Vicariate of Jolo.

== History ==
It began as a media apostolate of the Missionary Oblates of Mary Immaculate, a religious congregation of men pioneering in missions in the Mindanao and Sulu archipelago regions. In June 2023, it went off the air.
