= Jasper Shia Que =

Filipino politician

Hadji Jasper Shia Que is a Filipino politician who is the current mayor of Bongao, Tawi-Tawi. He was elected mayor in 2010. He is also the son of former Bongao mayor Albert Que.

Jasper was shot on February 7, 2016 in Zamboanga City.

According to the initial investigation by the Zamboanga City Police, two riding in tandem suspects fired at Que’s convoy.
