= DXDX-AM =

Philippine radio station

Radyo Ronda General Santos (DXDX)
- General Santos; Philippines
- Broadcast area: Soccsksargen and surrounding areas
- Frequency: 693 kHz
- Branding: RPN DXDX Radyo Ronda

Programming
- Languages: Cebuano, Filipino
- Format: News, Public Affairs, Talk, Drama
- Network: Radyo Ronda

Ownership
- Owner: Radio Philippines Network

History
- First air date: 1961
- Former frequencies: 680 kHz (1961–1978)
- Call sign meaning: None; sequentially assigned

Technical information
- Licensing authority: NTC
- Power: 5,000 watts

DXDX (693 AM) Radyo Ronda is a radio station owned and operated by the Radio Philippines Network. The station's studio is located along P. Acharon Blvd., Brgy. Dadiangas West, General Santos.

On June 8, 2026, The station's broadcasts have stopped due to the collapse of its broadcasting facilities along with multiple other FM/AM stations due to the 7.8 magnitude earthquake in the Soccsksargen region.
