= Mindanao Gazette =

English weekly newspaper

- Type: Weekly newspaper
- Format: Broadsheet
- Editor-in-chief: Francis Anthony Diansay
- Founded: 1992
- Language: English
- Headquarters: Davao City, Philippines

The Mindanao Gazette is a newspaper of general circulation founded in 1992 by the late Judge Leonardo M. Barnes (Ret.). It is published with editorial and business offices at No. 30 Yakal Street, Palm Village, Davao City.

According to local media histories, the newspaper was launched in 1993 and initially operated as a daily publication before later transitioning to a weekly format due to financial constraints.
