= DWQA =

Radio station in Legazpi, Philippines

Home Radio Legazpi (DWQA)
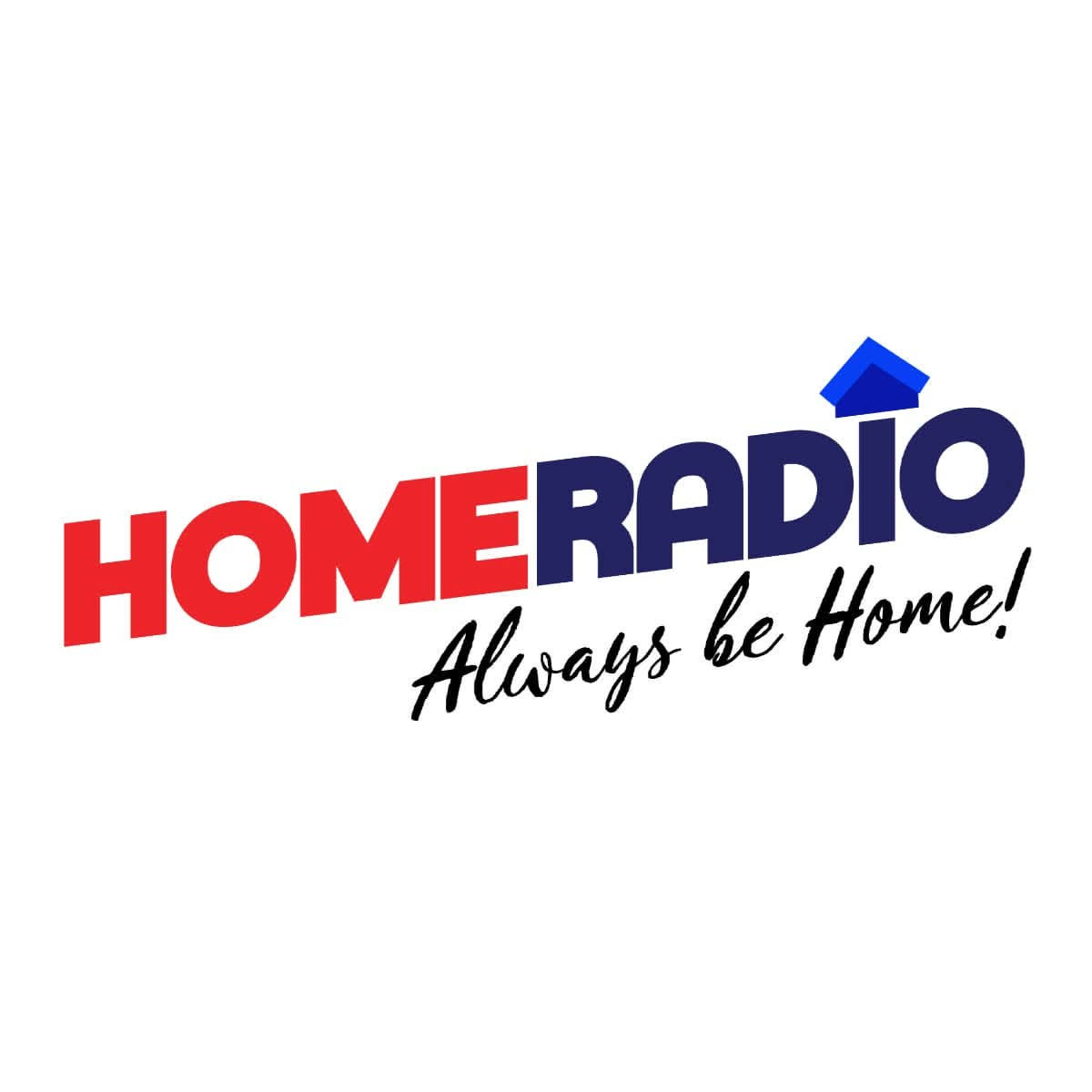
- Legazpi; Philippines
- Broadcast area: Albay and surrounding areas
- Frequency: 92.3 MHz
- Branding: 92.3 Home Radio

Programming
- Language: English
- Format: Soft adult contemporary
- Network: Home Radio

Ownership
- Owner: Aliw Broadcasting Corporation

History
- First air date: 2006
- Former names: DWIZ (2023-2026)

Technical information
- Licensing authority: NTC
- Power: 10,000 watts
- ERP: 30,000 watts

DWQA (92.3 FM), broadcasting as 92.3 Home Radio, is a radio station owned and operated by Aliw Broadcasting Corporation. Its studio and transmitter are located at the 4th Floor, ALC Fortune Bldg., Rizal St., Brgy. Pigcale, Legazpi, Albay.

== History ==
Home Radio Legazpi logo from July 2017 to January 2023.

The station was formerly under the Home Radio network from its inception in 2006 to January 16, 2023. On January 30, 2023, it was relaunched under the DWIZ network. On April 30, 2026, DWIZ News FM made its final broadcast. On May 8, after a week of music automation, it was relaunched under the Home Radio network.
