= DXBC-TV =

- General Santos; Philippines
- Channels: Analog: 39 (UHF); Digital: 37 (UHF) (ISDB-T) (test broadcast); Virtual: 37.01
- Branding: Brigada News Channel Metro GenSan

Programming
- Affiliations: Independent

Ownership
- Owner: Brigada Mass Media Corporation; (Baycomms Broadcasting Corporation)
- Sister stations: 89.5 Brigada News FM

History
- Founded: October 14, 2012
- Former channel numbers: 46 (October 14, 2012–November 30, 2015); 34 (December 1, 2015–September 22, 2019)
- Call sign meaning: BayComms

Technical information
- Licensing authority: NTC
- Power: Analog: 10,000 watts; Digital: 500 watts TPO
- Transmitter coordinates: 6°8′9″N 125°10′56″E

Links
- Website: www.brigada.ph

DXBC-TV (channel 39) is an independent television station in General Santos, Philippines. Owned and operated by Brigada Mass Media Corporation, the station maintains studios and hybrid analog/digital transmitter at the Brigada Complex, NLSA Road, Purok Bayanihan, Barangay San Isidro, General Santos.

On January 13, 2013, after the series of test broadcast (that started from October 14, 2012 to the first few days of January 2013). The station's original channel assignment, DXFG-TV (channel 46; licensed to Asian Multimedia and Production Company, Inc.), was launched at the first broadcast of thanksgiving party at the Family Country Convention Center in General Santos, The station and channel was transferred to TV channel 34 on December 1, 2015, and later to TV channel 39 on September 23, 2019, with stronger and wider signal coverage as the station's transmitter has been relocated to its present home at the Brigada Complex with a power of 10,000 watts. The station is on-air and operates daily from 4:00 AM to 11:30 PM.

== Programming ==
- Larga Brigada
- Banat Brigada
  - Banat Brigada Balita
- Brigada Balita Nationwide
  - Brigada Balita Nationwide sa Umaga
  - Brigada Balita Nationwide sa Tanghali
  - Brigada Balita Nationwide sa Hapon
  - Drivemax Brigada Balita Nationwide
- Tira Brigada
  - Tira Brigada Balita Lokal
- Birada Brigada
- Brigada Drive Thru
- Brigada Lovelines
- Brigada Pica-Pica
- Brigada Mindanao
- Brigadahan 1Tahanan
- Di Pwede Yan
- Powercells
- Night Habit
- Itanong Mo Kay Doc
- Sine Brigada
- Ronda Brigada
  - Ronda Brigada Sabado
  - Ronda Clock
- Crosstalk
- Agri Tayo Soccsksargen
- KaBrigadahan Nationwide
- Puntos ni Elmer Catulpos
- Morning Hataw

== Defunct programming ==
- Brigada Connection
- Brigada Balita Nationwide sa Tanghali
- Brigada Balita Nationwide sa Hapon
- Insights
- Dokumentao
- Happy Lang
- Brigada Top Stories
- Opinyon
- Brigada Healthline
- Imbocada Balita
- Brigada Music Video
- Brigada Music Video: Tunog Lokal
- Brigada Music Video: Hitbacks
- Todo-Todo sa Udto
- Giya sa Maayong Panglawas
- Drivemax Pitoytoy
- Harana sa Brigada
- Ang Lungsod Angay nga Masayod
- Sunday Mass at OLPGV (Our Lady of Peace and Good Voyage)
- Weekend Review
- Brigada Action Line
- PowerCells: Tanong Mo, Sagot ni Doc
- Frontline
- Morning Hataw
- Happy Dreams
- Brigadahan GenSan
- Brigada Mornings
- Just In
- Engkwentro
- Brigada Tanghali Saya (BTS)

== Personalities ==
=== Present ===
- Elmer Catulpos
- Atty. Froebel Kan Balleque (main anchor)
- Jennifer Solis (station manager)
- Joel Eduque
- Joseph Reyes
- Erine Dejecacion
- Hannah Perez
- DJ Justine Manansala
- Val Guilaran
- David Amor
- Sharmiella Calinawan
- Cherish Jane Alido
- Nathalie Sariego
- Russiel Jean Mantile
- Laizelle Labajo
- Jose "Dingdong" Ciencia
- Kathrina Ilejay-Tan
- Cherry "DJ Cherry" Catulpos
- Ernie Gabonada
- Enamie Mogpon
- MJ Fernandez
- Richelyn Gubalani
- Danny Casi
- Ever Diazon
- CL "DJ Baby Kho" Rivera
- DJ Tanya Chan

=== Past ===
- Jerry Dumdum
- Krizza Feb Udal
- Belinda Salas-Canlas (host of Insights and Crosstalk; now with DXMD 927 RMN General Santos)
- Kennedy Pingas
- Joffrey Bong Cagape (now with 103.1 Radyo Bandera News FM General Santos)
- Abner Jun Mendoza Jr.
- Austin Papa Calbo Deparoco (now with DXCP 585 Radyo Totoo General Santos)
- Eleazardo Don Pakito Mallonga
- Gloven Yntong (now with 99.9 Big Radio)
- Jeremiah Diana (now Corporate Communications Manager at Monde Nissin Corporation)
- Jeruz Alcazarin (now with 103.1 Radyo Bandera News FM General Santos)
- JB Lee
- Leila Dacua
- Jessa Leduna
- Abby Lorenzo
- Jocelyn Jersey Cadeliña (now with 99.9 Big Radio)
- Crystal Joy Romano (now with DXCP 585 Radyo Totoo General Santos)
- Irish Ampuyas (now with DXCP 585 Radyo Totoo General Santos)
- Allan Bambalan (now with DXMD 927 RMN General Santos)
- Faith Dandoy (now with 103.1 Radyo Bandera News FM General Santos)
- Johanna Quilinderino
- Charmaine Betty Uy
- Marco Vergara (now with 91.3 Brigada News FM Lebak)
- Kent Abrigana (now with GMA Regional TV–One Mindanao)
- Abby Caballero (now with GMA Regional TV–One Mindanao)
- Sheliene Joy Canda (now Marketing Manager at SM City General Santos)
- Atty. Art Cloma
- Joe Pula
- Rolly Pacquiao (now with 91.1 Pacman Radio)
- Adonis Presillas (moved to 96.7 Brigada News FM Butuan)
- Reyna Albutra
- Eva Caitom
- Sean David Ruba
- Mark Gerodias
- Carlo Dugaduga (moved to 96.7 Brigada News FM Butuan)
- Abner Francisco (moved to 105.1 Brigada News FM Mega Manila and return to 97.5 Brigada News FM Kidapawan)
- Jay Mark Canlas (moved to 89.3 Brigada News FM Cotabato)
- Rona Mujemulta
- Leo Martin Cellan (moved to DXMD RMN General Santos 927)
- Klarisse Morales (moved to DXMD RMN General Santos)
- CJ Sering
- Jocille Cervantes
- Thirdly Santander
- Caryl Pizon
- Merry Grace Cortez
- Jerwin Paglinawan
- Rem Agdon (moved to RPN DXDX Radyo Ronda 693 General Santos)
- Jonas Andrade
- Erwin Cabahug
- Chris Legaspi
- Dyll Bartolaba

== Digital television ==
=== Digital channels ===
UHF Channel 37 (611.143 MHz)

Channel	Video	Aspect	Short name	Programming	Note
37.01	1080i	16:9	BRIGADA TV-HD	Brigada TV (Main DXBC-TV programming)	Test broadcast (500 watts)
37.02	480i	16:9	BRIGADA TV-SD	89.5 Brigada News FM General Santos	Test broadcast (500 watts)

== Areas of coverage ==
=== Primary areas ===
- General Santos (urban and rural areas)
- South Cotabato
- Sarangani
- Cotabato
- Sultan Kudarat

== See also ==
- 89.5 Brigada News FM - sister FM station
