= DWKL =

Radio station in Lucena, Philippines

Brigada News FM Lucena (DWKL)
- Lucena; Philippines
- Broadcast area: Quezon and surrounding areas
- Frequency: 92.7 MHz
- Branding: 92.7 Brigada News FM

Programming
- Language: Filipino
- Format: Contemporary MOR, OPM, News, Talk
- Network: Brigada News FM

Ownership
- Owner: Brigada Mass Media Corporation; (Baycomms Broadcasting Corporation)

History
- First air date: 1987

Technical information
- Licensing authority: NTC
- Power: 10,000 watts

Links
- Webcast: Live Stream

DWKL (92.7 FM), broadcasting as 92.7 Brigada News FM, is a radio station owned and operated by Brigada Mass Media Corporation. Its studio and transmitter are located at The Crossroads Building, Maharlika Highway, Brgy. Isabang, Lucena.

Despite its proximity to its sister station in Batangas, the station primarily served the Lucena-Gumaca radio market with its own local personnel under its former news format.

== History ==
=== 1987-2011: Bay Radio ===
The station first went on air as 92.7 Bay Radio of the Baycomms Broadcasting Corporation, having a CHR format. Similar to most stations within the network, financial losses hounded the outlet until April 2011 when regional company Air One Global Advertising Corporation brokered 92.7 FM.

=== April-June 2011: Failed move to Batangas ===
Air One relocated 92.7 FM to Lemery, Batangas and installed a 30 kW antenna on a series of test broadcasts without any stingers except its temporary ID: You are listening to 92.7 DWKL, now on test broadcast.

However, Air One was granted instead a new leasing agreement from Radio Mindanao Network through DWCH at 91.9 FM, vacating 92.7 on June 6, 2011, and returning the existing calls and original ownership to Lucena City.

=== 2011-2013: Joint venture ===
Baycomms retook operations of 92.7 after its failed move. This time, the Lucena City government brokered the station. This format lasted until Brigada Mass Media Corporation bought the Bay Radio network.

=== 2013-2019: Brigada News FM ===
In April 2014, 92.7 Brigada News FM launched its news operations with Sandy Madarcos. The former was later promoted to 104.7 FM.

The station, despite initial success, lagged behind the already-crowded Lucena all-news ratings and by July 2015, the station cut its local programming to defer operations to its sister station in Batangas.

In July 2017, 92.7 resumed its local operations on a test broadcast. The full relaunch of the station was on September 8, 2017.

By May 2019, the station still lagged in the Lucena City radio ratings, raising concerns that the station & nearby 104.7 from Manila/Batangas are both received in the city.

=== 2019-2020: Return of Bay Radio ===
On June 8, 2019, 92.7 was rebranded back as 92.7 Bay Radio with its new slogan "Sabay sa Bay" and it switched back to its music format. The move also came as a corporate and logistical decision to unify the regional coverage for 104.7. Despite the format change, its Brigada Healthline publicity assets remains intact.

=== 2020-present : Return of Brigada News FM ===
On January 20, 2020, the station switched back to Brigada News FM branding and usual format. It currently carries a mix of local programming and hook-up shows with Brigada News FM National/Manila.
