= Laoag =

Capital city of Ilocos Norte, Philippines

- Component city
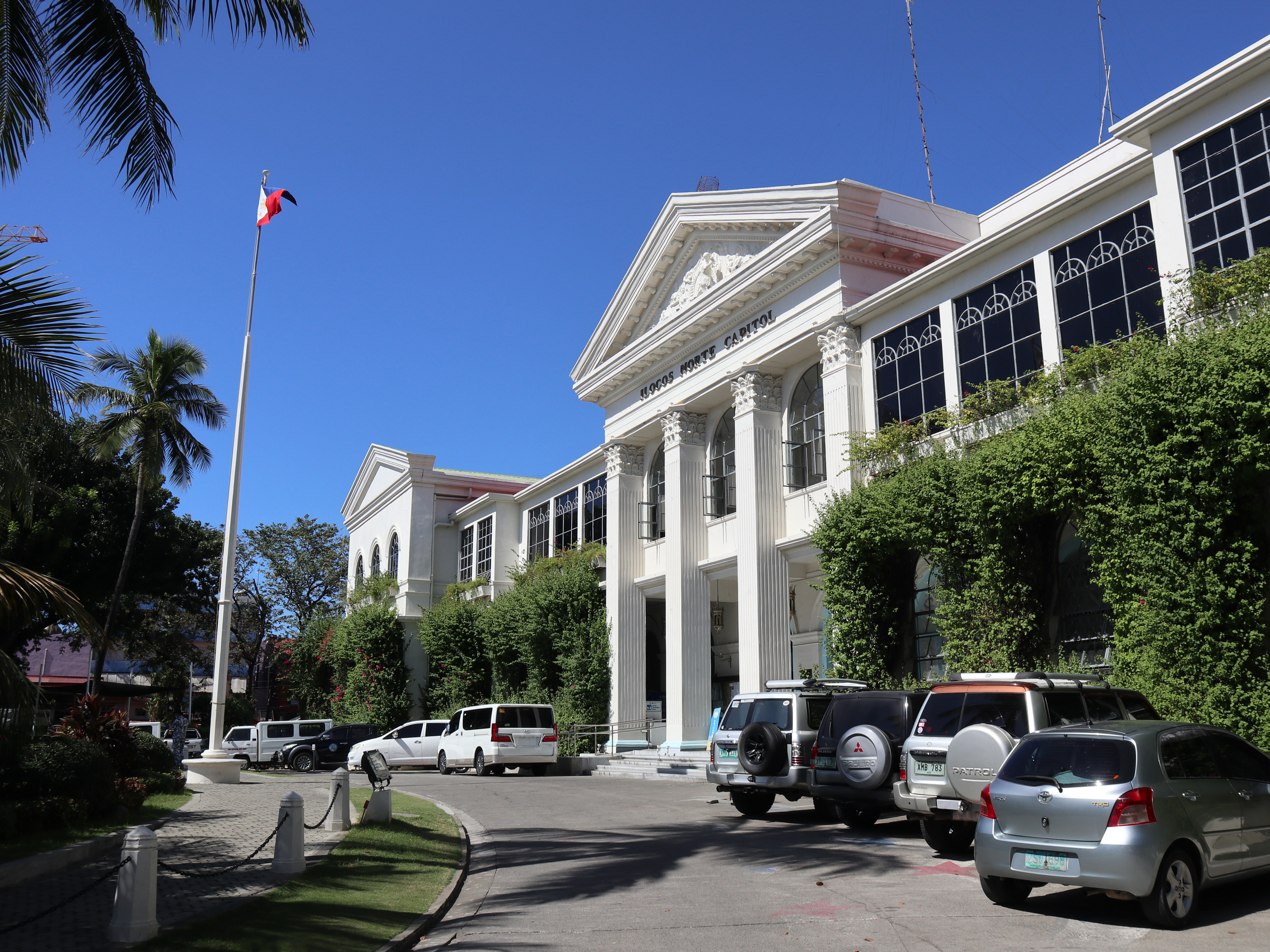
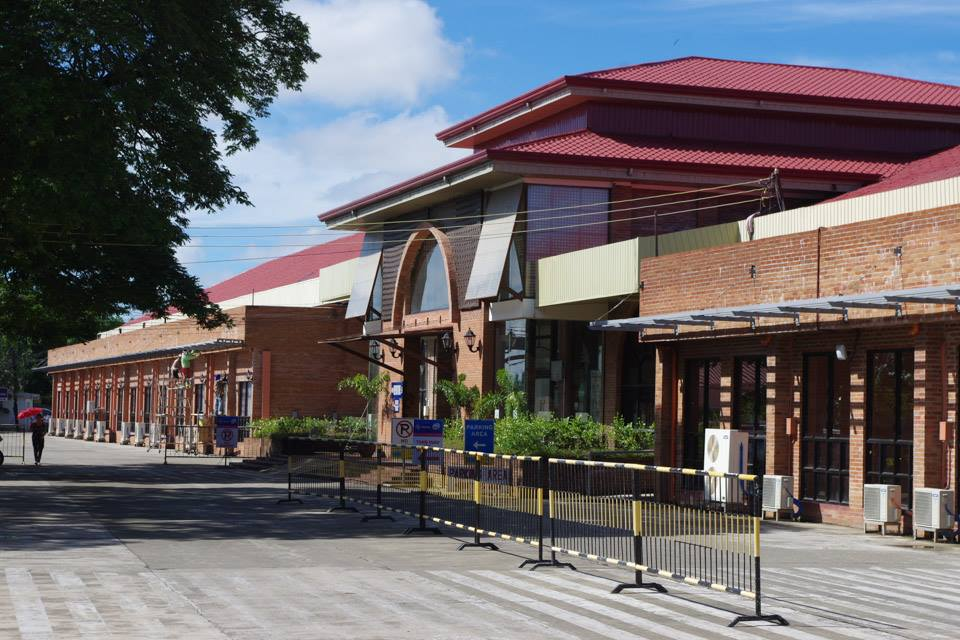
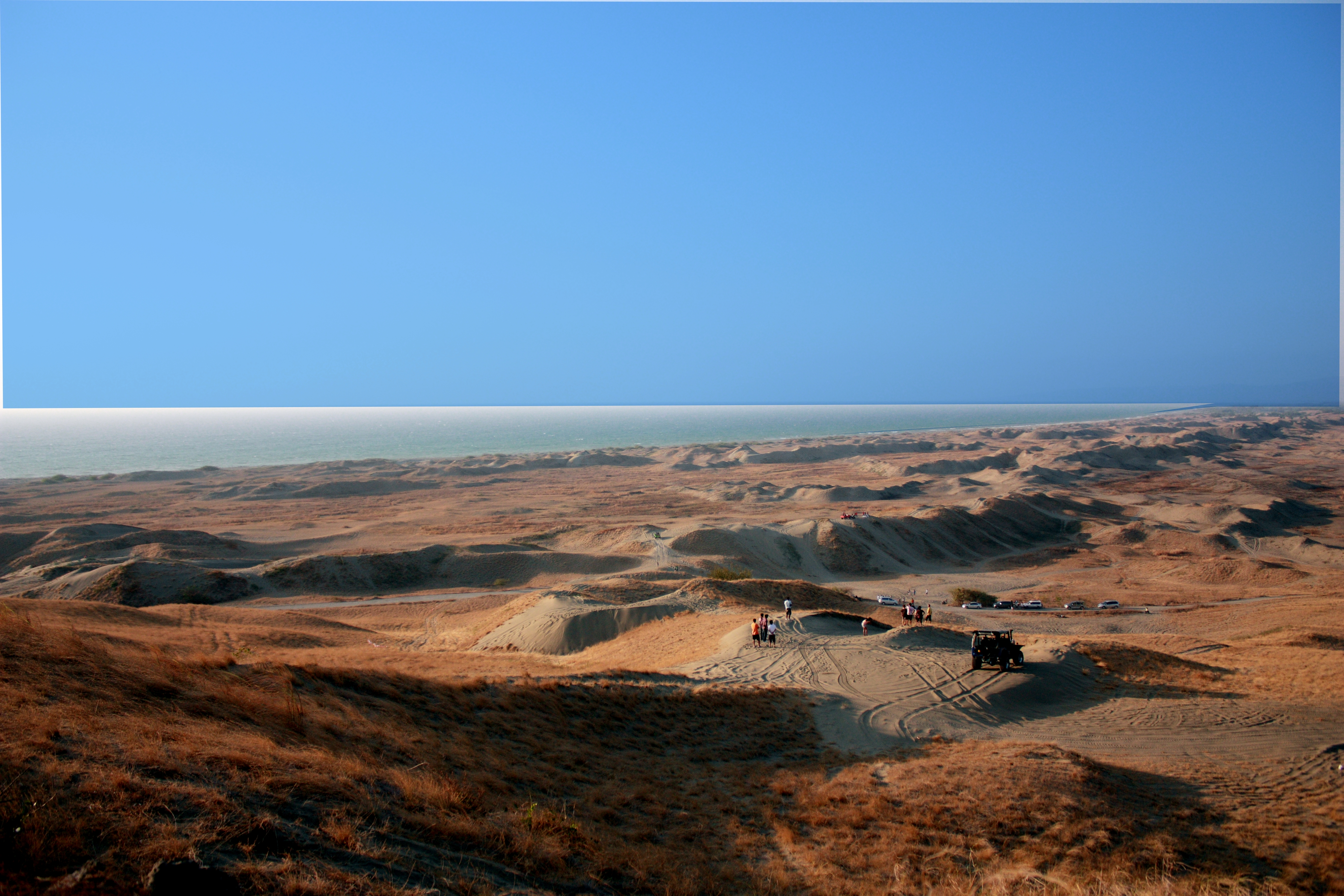
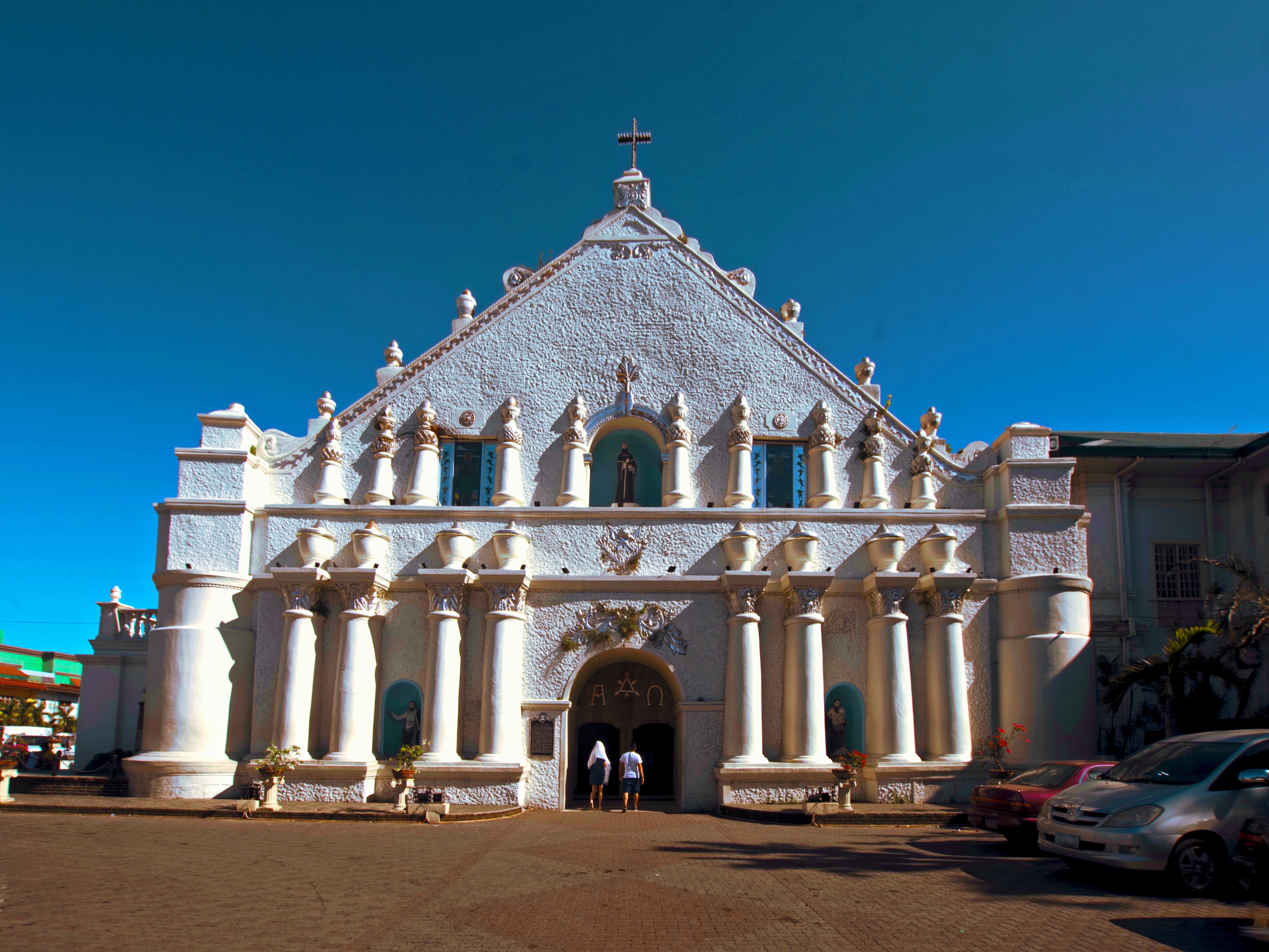
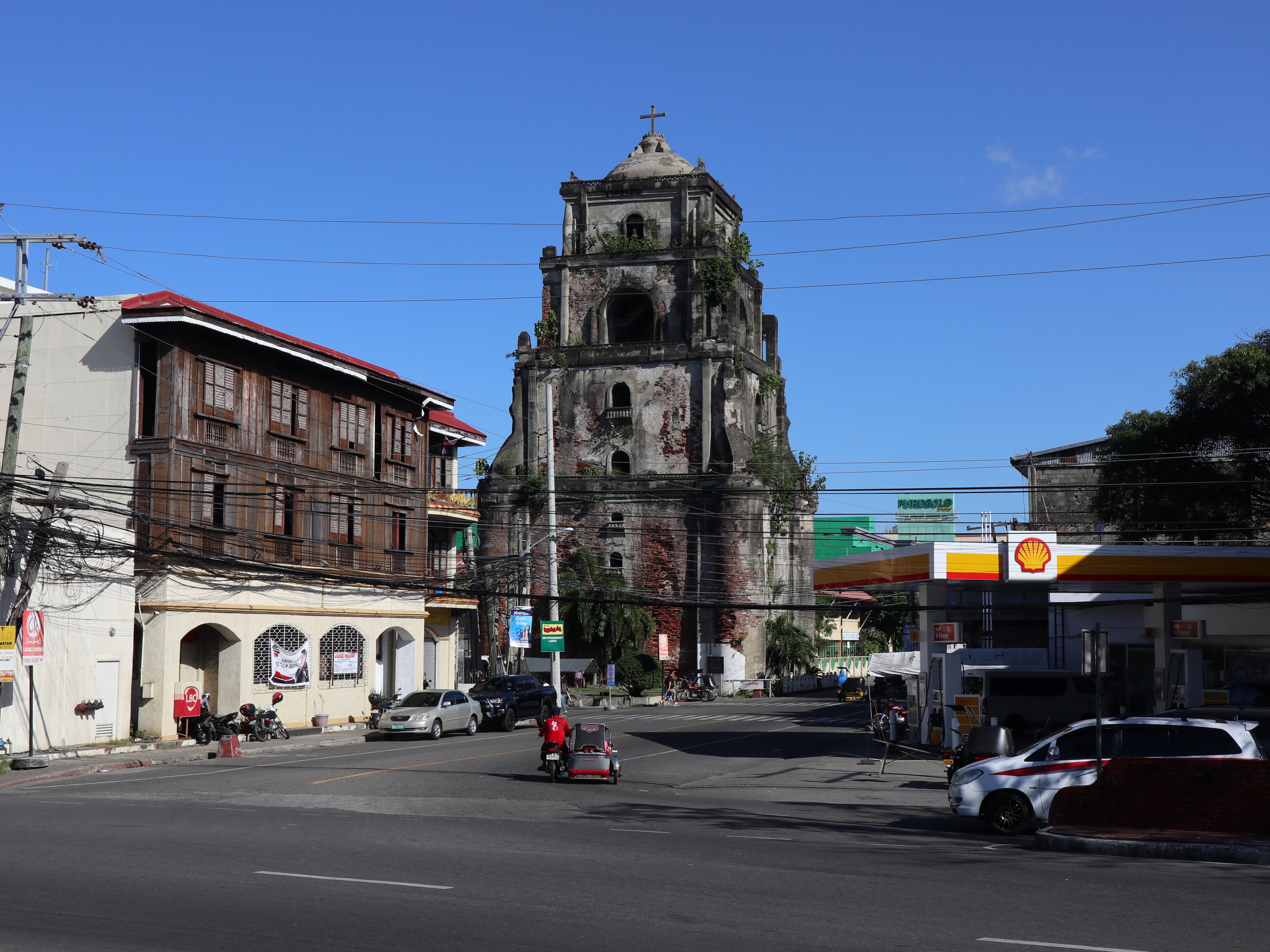
- From top, left to right: Ilocos Norte Provincial Capitol, Exterior of Laoag International Airport, La Paz Sand Dunes, Laoag Cathedral, Sinking bell tower of Laoag

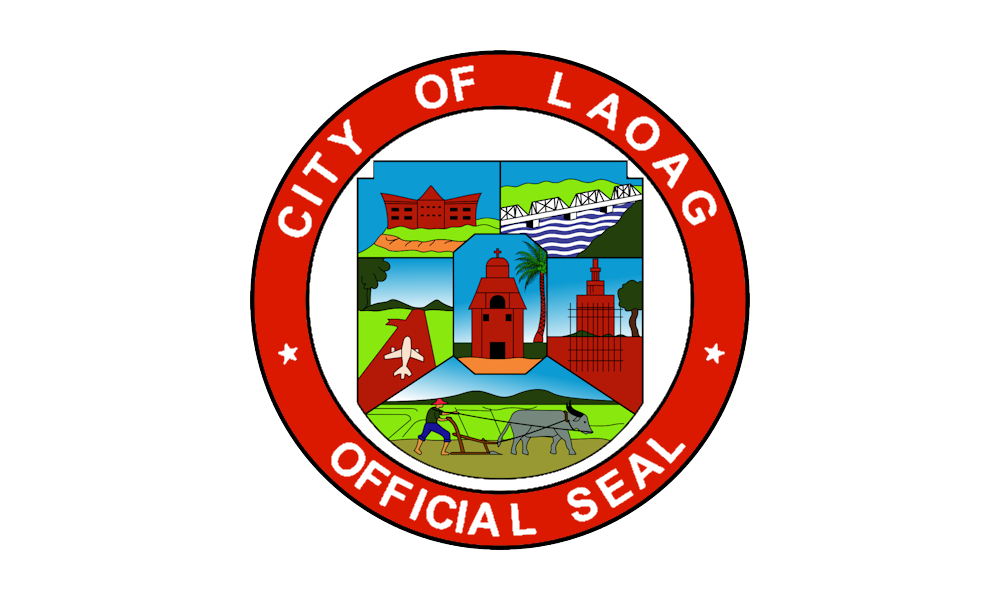
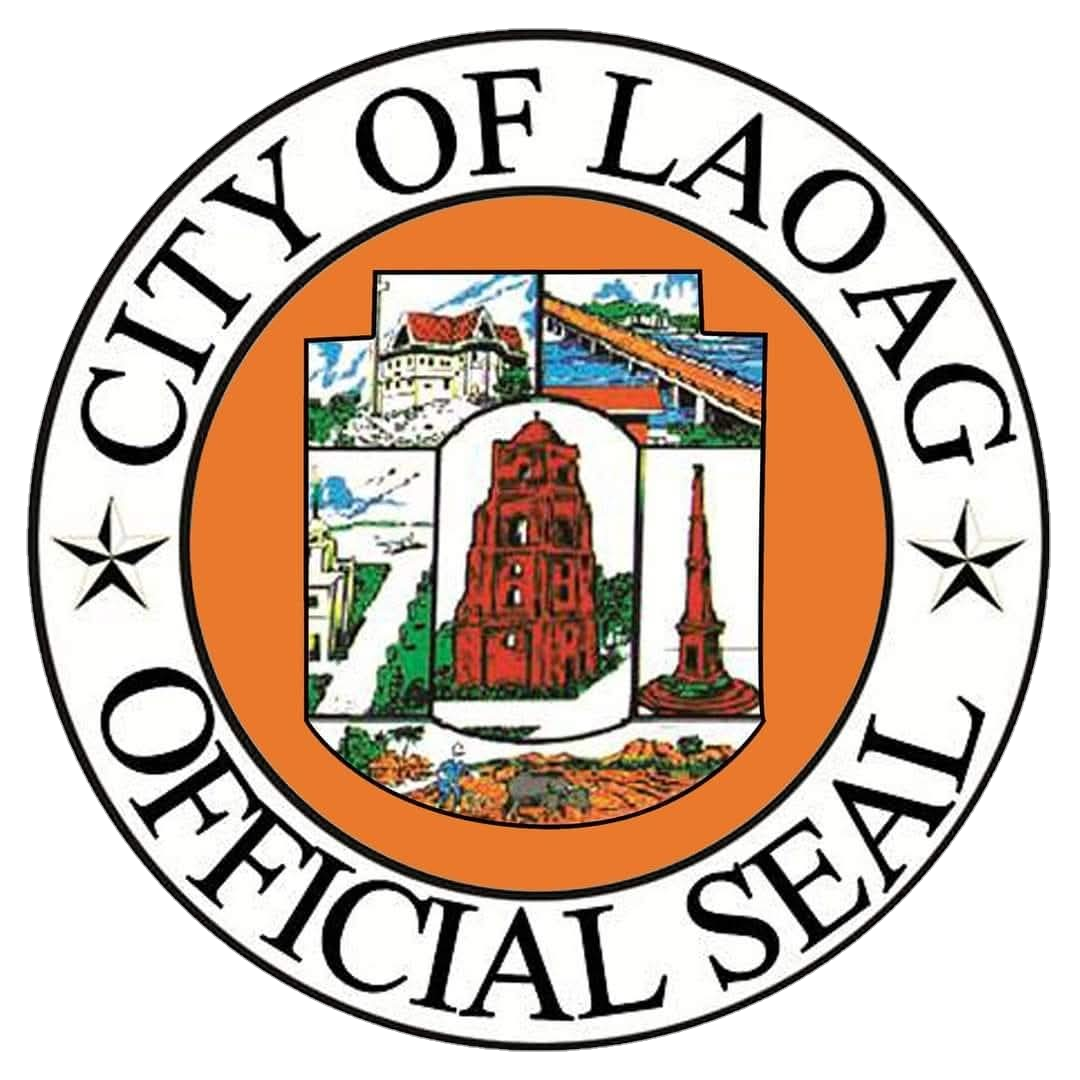
- Flag Seal
- Etymology: Ilocano: lawag ("light")
- Nickname: The Sunshine City
- Anthem: Marcha de Laoag (Laoag March)
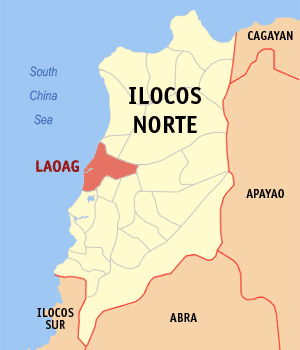
- Map of Ilocos Norte with Laoag highlighted
- Interactive map of Laoag
- Location within the Philippines
- Coordinates: 18°11′52″N 120°35′37″E
- Country: Philippines
- Region: Ilocos Region
- Province: Ilocos Norte
- District: 1st district
- Founded: 1580
- Cityhood: June 19, 1965
- Barangays: 80 (see Barangays)

Government
  - Type: Sangguniang Panlungsod
  - Mayor: James Bryan Q. Alcid (Nacionalista)
  - Vice Mayor: Rey Carlos V. Fariñas (PDR)
  - Representative: Ferdinand Alexander A. Marcos (PFP)
  - Mayor-council government: Members: Jaybee G. Baquiran; Jeff Ericson P. Fariñas; John Michael V. Fariñas; Juan Conrado A. Respicio II; Enrico F. Ang; Donald G. Nicolas; Jason Bader L. Perera; Justine Clarence G. Chua; Bjorn T. Lao; Edison U. Chua
  - Electorate: 82,688 voters (2025)

Area
  - Total: 116.08 km^{2} (44.82 sq mi)
- Elevation: 57 m (187 ft)
- Highest elevation: 759 m (2,490 ft)
- Lowest elevation: 0 m (0 ft)

Population (2024 census)
  - Total: 112,117
  - Density: 965.86/km^{2} (2,501.6/sq mi)
  - Households: 27,875

Economy
  - Income class: 3rd city income class
  - Poverty incidence: 2.82% (2023)
  - Revenue: ₱ 1,204 million (2024)
  - Assets: ₱ 21,440 million (2024)
  - Expenditure: ₱ 927.9 million (2024)
  - Liabilities: ₱ 820.8 million (2024)

Service provider
  - Electricity: Ilocos Norte Electric Cooperative (INEC)
- Time zone: UTC+8 (PST)
- ZIP code: 2900
- PSGC: 012812000
- IDD : area code: +63 (0)77
- Native languages: Ilocano; Tagalog
- Website: www.laoagcity.gov.ph

Laoag ([laʊˈag]), officially the City of Laoag (Ilocano: Siudad ti Laoag; Filipino: Lungsod ng Laoag), is a component city and capital of the province of Ilocos Norte, Philippines. According to the 2024 census, it has a population of 112,117 people.

It is the province's most populous settlement, as well as its political, commercial, and industrial hub. The Ilocos Region's busiest commercial airport is also built in Laoag. It is also the northernmost city in the Philippines.

The municipalities of San Nicolas, Paoay, Sarrat, Piddig, Vintar, and Bacarra form its boundaries. The foothills of the Cordillera Central mountain range to the east, and the South China Sea to the west are its physical boundaries.

Laoag experiences a prevailing monsoon climate of Northern Luzon, characterized by a dry season from November to April and a wet season from May to October. Despite being battered by powerful typhoons occasionally, Laoag can still be referred to as the "Sunshine City".

== History ==
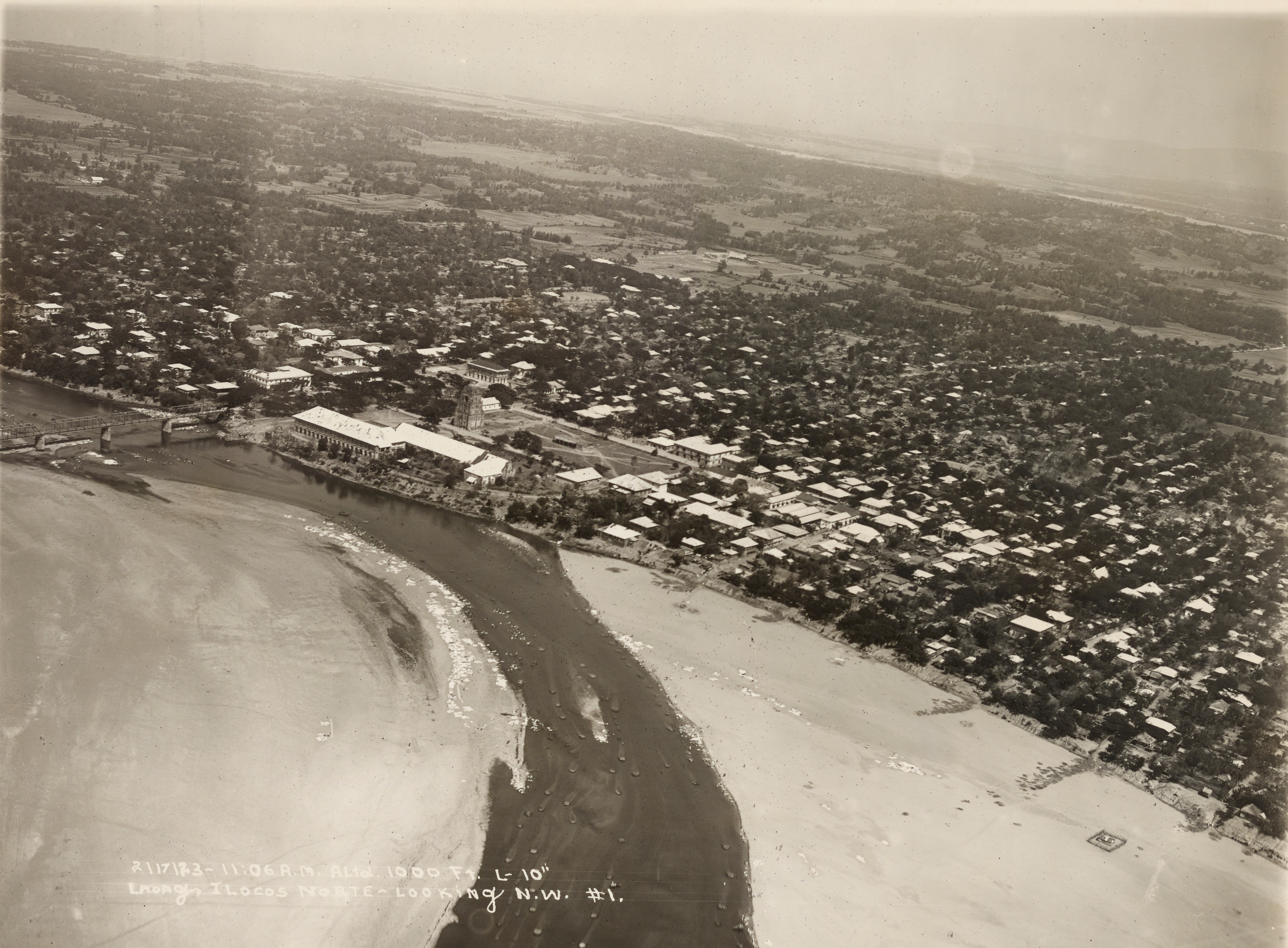
Aerial view of Laoag, 21 July 1923 11:06 am

In 1571, when the Spanish conquistadors had Manila more or less under their control, they began looking for new sites to conquer. Legaspi's grandson, Juan de Salcedo, volunteered to lead one of these expeditions. Together with eight armed boats and 45 men, the 22-year-old voyager headed north.

On June 13, 1572, Salcedo and his men landed in Vigan and then proceeded towards Laoag, Currimao, and Badoc. As they sailed along the coast, they were surprised to see numerous sheltered coves (looc) where the locals lived: as a result, they named the region "Ylocos" and its people "Ylocanos".

As the Christianization of the region grew, so did the landscape of the area. Vast tracts of land were utilized for churches and bell towers in line with the Spanish mission of bajo de las campanas ('under the bells') – a proclamation by King Philip's 1573 Law of the Indies. In the town plaza, it was not uncommon to see garrisons under the church bells. The colonization process was slowly being carried out.

The Spanish colonization of the region, however, was never completely successful. Owing to the abusive practices of many Augustinian friars, a number of Ilocanos revolted against their colonizers. Noteworthy of these were the Dingras uprising (1589) and Pedro Almasan revolt in San Nicolas (1660). In 1762, Diego Silang led a series of battles aimed at freeing the Ilocanos from the Spanish yoke. When he died from an assassin's bullet, his widow Gabriela continued the cause. She too was captured and hanged. In 1807, the sugar cane (basi) brewers of Piddig rose up in arms to protest the government's monopoly of the wine industry. In 1898, the church excommunicated Gregorio Aglipay for refusing to cut off ties with the revolutionary forces of Gen. Emilio Aguinaldo. Unperturbed, he established the Iglesia Filipina Independiente. Aglipay's movement and the national sentiment it espoused helped restore the self-respect of many Filipinos.

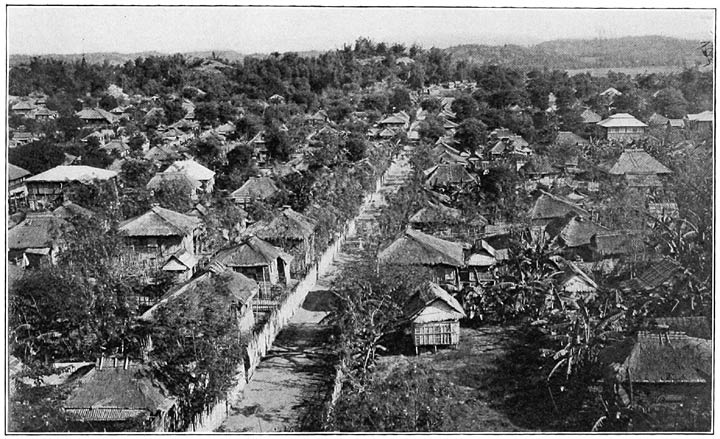
A street of Laoag, the capital of Ilocos Norte, 1900–1913

"The great increase in population from 1715 to 1818 from 18,980 to 282,845 made the administration of the province very difficult. Due to the excessive monopolies and forced labor, there were several uprisings: first by the people of Dingras in 1589; one that was led by Pedro Almazan in 1616; the revolt of Diego Silang in 1762–1763; by Ambaristo in 1788; by Pedro Mateo in 1808 (also known as Basi Revolt) and uprising of Sarrat in 1815. For this reason, the division of the Ilocos into two provinces was recommended by the local authorities. On February 2, 1818, a Spanish Royal Decree was promulgated dividing the Province of Ilocos Norte from Ilocos Sur. Laoag, which was then the biggest center of population, was made the capital of Ilocos Norte." The 1818 census noted that Laoag and Ilocos Norte had 55,000 native Filipino families and had 5 large Spanish-Filipino clans. Ilocos Norte was noted to be rich and highly cultured and was a patron of the arts and crafts, and produced globally recognized artists such as Juan Luna.

Laoag was captured by the Japanese Army on December 12, 1941, two days after the landing at Vigan and Aparri. Its airport was then used by the Japanese for most of World War II.

=== Cityhood ===
On June 19, 1965, Laoag changed from municipality to city status, following a plebiscite and passed into law by the Senate President Ferdinand Edralin Marcos. It remained the capital of Ilocos Norte. Mayor Eulalio F. Siazon and Engineer Trinidad Lucas Aurelio were part of a team that led the drive to convert Laoag into a city. Another members of the group was Simeon Valdez who filed the bill in Congress, co-authored by Antonio Raquiza. The first city mayor was Eulalio Fonacier Siazon.

== Geography ==
The City of Laoag is located at the west-central part of the Province of Ilocos Norte bordering the South China Sea. It is bounded on the east by the Municipality of Sarrat; in the southeast by the Municipality of San Nicolas; in the southwest by the Municipality of Paoay, in the northeast the Municipality of Vintar; in the northwest by the Municipality of Bacarra; and in the west by the South China Sea. It is one of the largest cities in the Ilocos Region.

Laoag is situated 482.95 kilometres (300.09 mi) from the country's capital city of Manila.

=== Barangays ===
Laoag is politically subdivided into 80 barangays. Each barangay consists of puroks and some have sitios.

The 80 barangays of the City of Laoag
Conventional Long Name	Barangay Number	Name	Former Name/Territory
Barangay No. 1, San Lorenzo (Poblacion)	1	San Lorenzo	Poblacion
Barangay No. 2, Santa Joaquina (Poblacion)	2	Santa Joaquina	Poblacion
Barangay No. 3, Nuestra Señora del Rosario (Poblacion)	3	Nuestra Señora del Rosario	Poblacion
Barangay No. 4, San Guillermo (Poblacion)	4	San Guillermo	Poblacion
Barangay No. 5, San Pedro (Poblacion)	5	San Pedro	Poblacion
Barangay No. 6, San Agustin (Poblacion)	6	San Agustin	Poblacion
Barangay No. 7-A, Nuestra Señora del Natividad (Poblacion)	7-A	Nuestra Señora del Natividad	Poblacion
Barangay No. 7-B, Nuestra Señora del Natividad (Poblacion)	7-B	Nuestra Señora del Natividad	Poblacion
Barangay No. 8, San Vicente (Poblacion)	8	San Vicente	Poblacion
Barangay No. 9, Santa Angela (Poblacion)	9	Santa Angela	Poblacion
Barangay No. 10, San Jose (Poblacion)	10	San Jose	Poblacion
Barangay No. 11, Santa Balbina (Poblacion)	11	Santa Balbina	Poblacion
Barangay No. 12, San Isidro (Poblacion)	12	San Isidro	Poblacion
Barangay No. 13, Nuestra Señora de Visitacion (Poblacion)	13	Nuestra Señora de Visitacion	Poblacion
Barangay No. 14, Santo Tomas (Poblacion)	14	Santo Tomas	Poblacion
Barangay No. 15, San Guillermo (Poblacion)	15	San Guillermo	Poblacion
Barangay No. 16, San Jacinto (Poblacion)	16	San Jacinto	Poblacion
Barangay No. 17, San Francisco (Poblacion)	17	San Francisco	Poblacion
Barangay No. 18, San Quirino (Poblacion)	18	San Quirino	Poblacion
Barangay No. 19, Santa Marcela (Poblacion)	19	Santa Marcela	Poblacion
Barangay No. 20, San Miguel (Poblacion)	20	San Miguel	Poblacion
Barangay No. 21, San Pedro (Poblacion)	21	San Pedro	Poblacion
Barangay No. 22, San Andres (Poblacion)	22	San Andres	Poblacion
Barangay No. 23, San Matias (Poblacion)	23	San Matias	Poblacion
Barangay No. 24, Nuestra Señora de Consolacion (Poblacion)	24	Nuestra Señora de Consolacion	Poblacion
Barangay No. 25, Santa Cayetana (Poblacion)	25	Santa Cayetana	Poblacion
Barangay No. 26, San Marcelino (Poblacion)	26	San Marcelino	Poblacion
Barangay No. 27, Nuestra Señora de Soledad (Poblacion)	27	Nuestra Señora de Soledad	Poblacion
Barangay No. 28, San Bernardo (Poblacion)	28	San Bernardo	Poblacion
Barangay No. 29, Santo Tomas (Poblacion)	29	Santo Tomas	Poblacion
Barangay No. 30-A, Suyo	30-A	Suyo	–
Barangay No. 30-B, Santa Maria	30-B	Santa Maria	–
Barangay No. 31, Talingaan	31	Talingaan	–
Barangay No. 32-A, La Paz East	32-A	La Paz East	–
Barangay No. 32-B, La Paz West	32-B	La Paz West	–
Barangay No. 32-C, La Paz East	32-C	La Paz East	–
Barangay No. 33-A, La Paz Proper	33-A	La Paz Proper	–
Barangay No. 33-B, La Paz Proper	33-B	La Paz Proper	–
Barangay No. 34-A, Gabu Norte West	34-A	Gabu Norte West	–
Barangay No. 34-B, Gabu Norte East	34-B	Gabu Norte East	–
Barangay No. 35, Gabu Sur	35	Gabu Sur	–
Barangay No. 36, Araniw	36	Araniw	–
Barangay No. 37, Calayab	37	Calayab	–
Barangay No. 38-A, Mangato East	38-A	Mangato East	–
Barangay No. 38-B, Mangato West	38-B	Mangato West	–
Barangay No. 39, Santa Rosa	39	Santa Rosa	–
Barangay No. 40, Balatong	40	Balatong	–
Barangay No. 41, Balacad	41	Balacad	–
Barangay No. 42, Apaya	42	Apaya	–
Barangay No. 43, Cavit	43	Cavit	–
Barangay No. 44, Zamboanga	44	Zamboanga	–
Barangay No. 45, Tangid	45	Tangid	–
Barangay No. 46, Nalbo	46	Nalbo	–
Barangay No. 47, Bengcag	47	Bengcag	–
Barangay No. 48-A, Cabungaan North	48-A	Cabungaan North	–
Barangay No. 48-B, Cabungaan South	48-B	Cabungaan South	–
Barangay No. 49-A, Darayday	49-A	Darayday	–
Barangay No. 49-B, Raraburan	49-B	Raraburan	–
Barangay No. 50, Buttong	50	Buttong	–
Barangay No. 51-A, Nangalisan East	51-A	Nangalisan East	–
Barangay No. 51-B, Nangalisan West	51-B	Nangalisan West	–
Barangay No. 52-A, San Mateo	52-A	San Mateo	–
Barangay No. 52-B, Lataag	52-B	Lataag	–
Barangay No. 53, Rioeng	53	Rioeng	–
Barangay No. 54-A, Camangaan	54-A	Camangaan	–
Barangay No. 54-B, Lagui-Sail	54-B	Lagui-Sail	–
Barangay No. 55-A, Barit-Pandan	55-A	Barit-Pandan	–
Barangay No. 55-B, Salet-Bulangon	55-B	Salet-Bulangon	–
Barangay No. 55-C, Vira	55-C	Vira	–
Barangay No. 56-A, Bacsil North	56-A	Bacsil North	–
Barangay No. 56-B, Bacsil South	56-B	Bacsil South	–
Barangay No. 57, Pila	57	Pila	–
Barangay No. 58, Casili	58	Casili	–
Barangay No. 59-A, Dibua South	59-A	Dibua South	–
Barangay No. 59-B, Dibua North	59-B	Dibua North	–
Barangay No. 60-A, Caaoacan	60-A	Caaoacan	–
Barangay No. 60-B, Madiladig	60-B	Madiladig	–
Barangay No. 61, Cataban	61	Cataban	–
Barangay No. 62-A, Navotas North	62-A	Navotas North	–
Barangay No. 62-B, Navotas South	62-B	Navotas South	–
Conventional Long Name	Barangay Number	Name	Former Name/Territory
Note: Italicized names are former names/territories.

=== Climate ===
Laoag has a tropical savanna climate with warm to hot temperatures year round. Temperatures dip slightly during the winter months between December and February. Characterized by two well-pronounced seasons; dry and wet and is classified as mild and pleasant climate. Dry season usually starts in November until April and wet during the rest of the year. The city is shielded from northeast monsoon and trade winds by the mountain ranges of Cordillera and Sierra Madre but it is exposed to the southwest monsoon and cyclone storms.

The rainy seasons, which has an average monthly rainfall of more than 100 millimetres (3.9 in). is from May to September with its peak in June, July and August. Rainfall during the peak month represents 68% of the annual rainfall with an average of 200 millimetres (7.9 in).

In the afternoon of May, temperature reach up to 36.2 °C (97.2 °F) and drops down to 11.4 °C (52.5 °F) in the early mornings of January. The city recorded an average temperature of 27.25 °C (81.05 °F) with a relative humidity of 75.5% in 1996. The city experiences an average of four to five tropical cyclones every year.

Climate data for Laoag City (1991–2020, extremes 1908–2023)
Month	Jan	Feb	Mar	Apr	May	Jun	Jul	Aug	Sep	Oct	Nov	Dec	Year
Record high °C (°F)	36.0 (96.8)	36.8 (98.2)	39.5 (103.1)	39.6 (103.3)	41.8 (107.2)	38.3 (100.9)	37.8 (100.0)	36.7 (98.1)	37.1 (98.8)	37.1 (98.8)	37.2 (99.0)	37.1 (98.8)	41.8 (107.2)
Mean daily maximum °C (°F)	30.6 (87.1)	31.2 (88.2)	32.5 (90.5)	33.6 (92.5)	33.7 (92.7)	33.1 (91.6)	32.2 (90.0)	31.6 (88.9)	31.8 (89.2)	32.1 (89.8)	32.0 (89.6)	31.1 (88.0)	32.1 (89.8)
Daily mean °C (°F)	25.2 (77.4)	25.8 (78.4)	27.2 (81.0)	28.6 (83.5)	29.2 (84.6)	28.9 (84.0)	28.4 (83.1)	28.0 (82.4)	27.9 (82.2)	27.8 (82.0)	27.4 (81.3)	26.3 (79.3)	27.6 (81.7)
Mean daily minimum °C (°F)	19.8 (67.6)	20.4 (68.7)	21.9 (71.4)	23.6 (74.5)	24.7 (76.5)	24.8 (76.6)	24.5 (76.1)	24.4 (75.9)	24.1 (75.4)	23.5 (74.3)	22.8 (73.0)	21.4 (70.5)	23.0 (73.4)
Record low °C (°F)	11.1 (52.0)	11.9 (53.4)	13.0 (55.4)	16.3 (61.3)	20.4 (68.7)	18.9 (66.0)	19.5 (67.1)	20.9 (69.6)	20.0 (68.0)	16.1 (61.0)	13.3 (55.9)	12.0 (53.6)	11.1 (52.0)
Average rainfall mm (inches)	6.1 (0.24)	3.0 (0.12)	5.3 (0.21)	21.8 (0.86)	218.8 (8.61)	286.5 (11.28)	478.9 (18.85)	593.7 (23.37)	412.9 (16.26)	117.2 (4.61)	36.6 (1.44)	6.2 (0.24)	2,187 (86.10)
Average rainy days (≥ 1 mm)	2	2	1	2	8	12	16	17	13	7	4	2	86
Average relative humidity (%)	75	75	74	75	78	82	86	87	87	80	78	75	79
Mean monthly sunshine hours	246.4	256.1	294.4	291.9	249.1	229.3	218.1	196.8	201.5	227.7	227.9	242.7	2,881.9
Source 1: PAGASA
Source 2: Deutscher Wetterdienst (sun, 1961–1990)

== Demographics ==
Population census of Laoag
Year	Pop.	±% p.a.
1903	34,454	—
1918	38,469	+0.74%
1939	41,842	+0.40%
1948	44,406	+0.66%
1960	50,198	+1.03%
1970	61,727	+2.09%
1975	66,259	+1.43%
1980	69,648	+1.00%
1990	83,756	+1.86%
1995	88,336	+1.00%
2000	94,466	+1.45%
2007	102,457	+1.13%
2010	104,904	+0.86%
2015	111,125	+1.10%
2020	111,651	+0.10%
2024	112,117	+0.10%
Source: Philippine Statistics Authority

According to the 2024 census, it has a population of 112,117 people, with a density of 970 inhabitants per square kilometre or 2,500 inhabitants per square mile.

Laoag City had a total population of 94,466 for the year 2000 as per NSO official report. In 1995, the total inhabitants of the city was 88,336, an increase of 6,130. Based on the 1995 and 2000 intercensal periods, the Average Annual Growth Rate of the city was 1.35%.

The number of households is 19,751 and the average household size is five (5) persons per household. Male-female ratio is 1:1; Birth rate is 26.44% while Death rate is 4.28%.

In the city of Laoag as of year 2000, Urban barangay San Lorenzo had the largest number of population at 2,883, followed by Rural barangay Buttong at 2,277, and then by Barangay 2 Santa Joaquina at 2,048. With the least inhabitants was Rural Barangay 39 Santa Rosa, 592, and then Barangay 52-A San Mateo, 594. Noticeably, the residents of Barangay 23 San Matias decreased by 740.

=== Language ===
The dominant dialect spoken in Laoag City is Ilocano.

=== Religion ===
The Roman Catholic and the Aglipayan Church are the dominant religious affiliations. The rest of the existing religions in the city include the Iglesia ni Cristo, and other Protestant groups with a significant number of adherents.

== Economy ==
Poverty incidence of Laoag (%)

Source: Philippine Statistics Authority

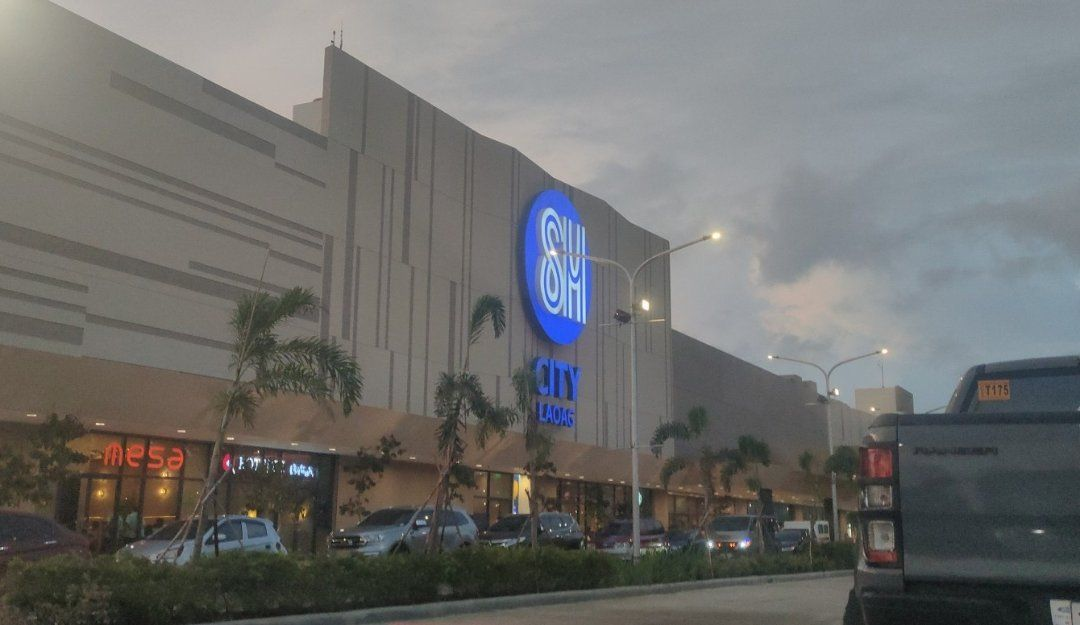
SM City Laoag

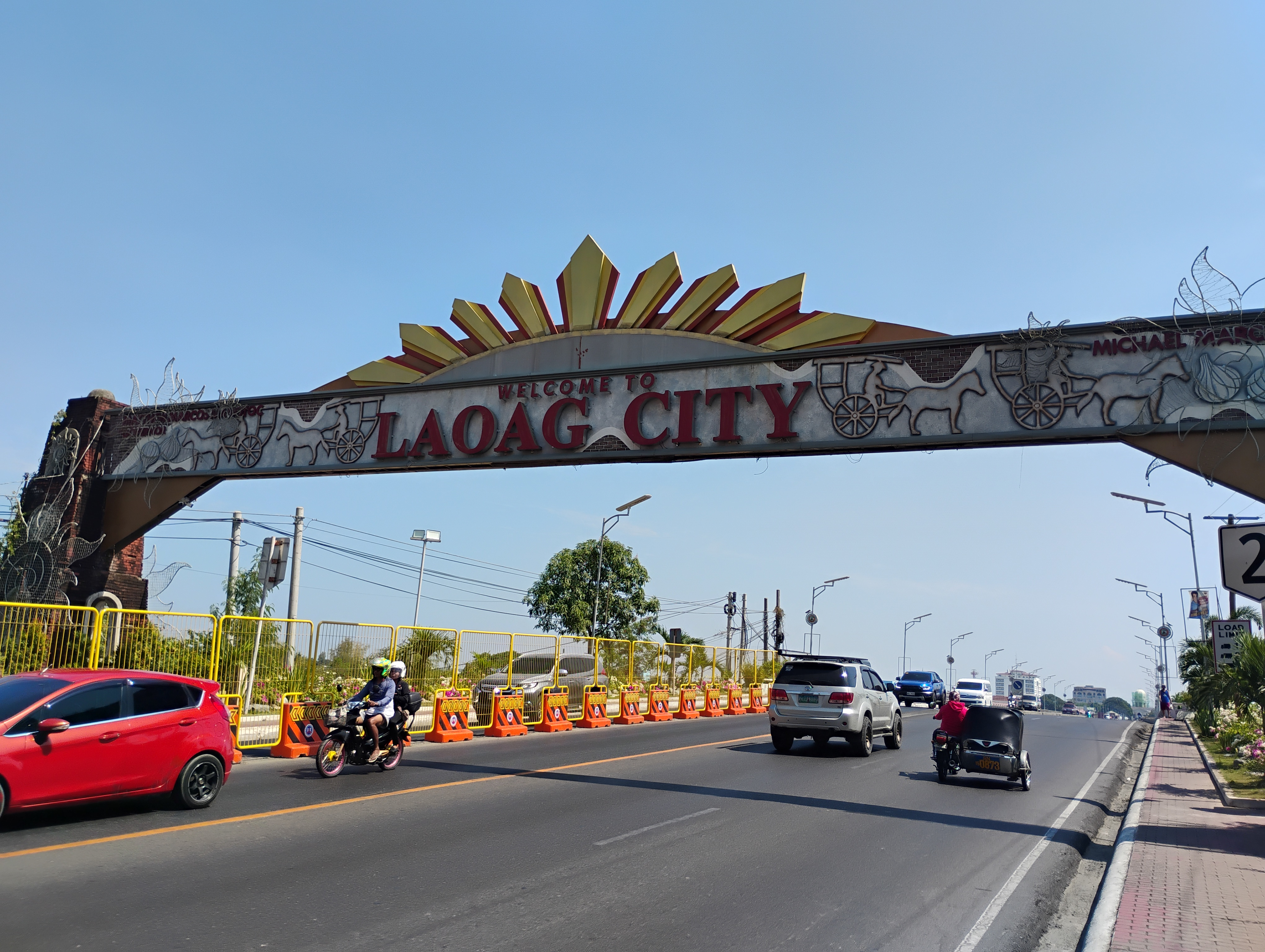
Laoag welcome arch

Strategically located at the northern tip of the Northwestern Luzon Growth Quadrangle. It is within hours of air travel to any one of East Asia's economic tigers such as Hong Kong, Mainland China, Japan, South Korea and Taiwan by way of the Laoag International Airport.

A banking system is also found in the city with more than twenty different local, domestic, and foreign banks ready to serve any financial needs.

With a 12,747.35 m^{2} (137,211.3 sq ft) total land area, Laoag City provides a large opportunity for economic expansion. The historic scenic tourist spots, availability of internationally competitive accommodations and facilities, and the presence of supportive national government agencies, makes Laoag an ecotourism center, as classified by the Department of Tourism.

Laoag and the surrounding municipalities also bolster a strong workforce. At present, most industries in the city are small-scale, consisting of small-scale food-processing factories, rice mills, jewelry-making, hollow blocks factories, and metal crafts. Established in the city center are retail giants like SM Prime Holdings with three stores (SM Savemore, Savemore Market, SM Hypermarket) along Rizal Street, and two stores owned by Puregold, with its latest branch located along A. Castro Avenue. SM City Laoag is located south of Padsan River in Barangay Nangalisan West, along Airport Road. Unitop, formerly Mart One, Novo, New India, ME, JTC, and ØNE Ø 5IVE are popular shopping centers. Robinsons Ilocos located in Barangay Nangalisan East (Laoag) and San Francisco (San Nicolas) is only 5 minutes ride from Laoag City Hall.

Megaworld has also secured ₱15 billion project to be developed in Barangay Calayab along the coast to be called "Ilocandia Coastown," its 34th township. The mixed-use beachfront is an 84-hectare parcel of land with 1.4-kilometer (0.87 mi) beach line adjacent to Fort Ilocandia Resort Hotel. Other townships under construction are the EL Sands Residences in Barangay Talingaan, and Bramasole Residences in Barangay Zamboanga. Robinsons Homes, Hanalei Heights, and Camella are located closely to the airport.

Meanwhile, San Guillermo Complex located east of Aurora Park is on its first phase of development. It will feature a modern shopping center, a high-rise hotel and a medical center.

== Government ==
=== Local government ===
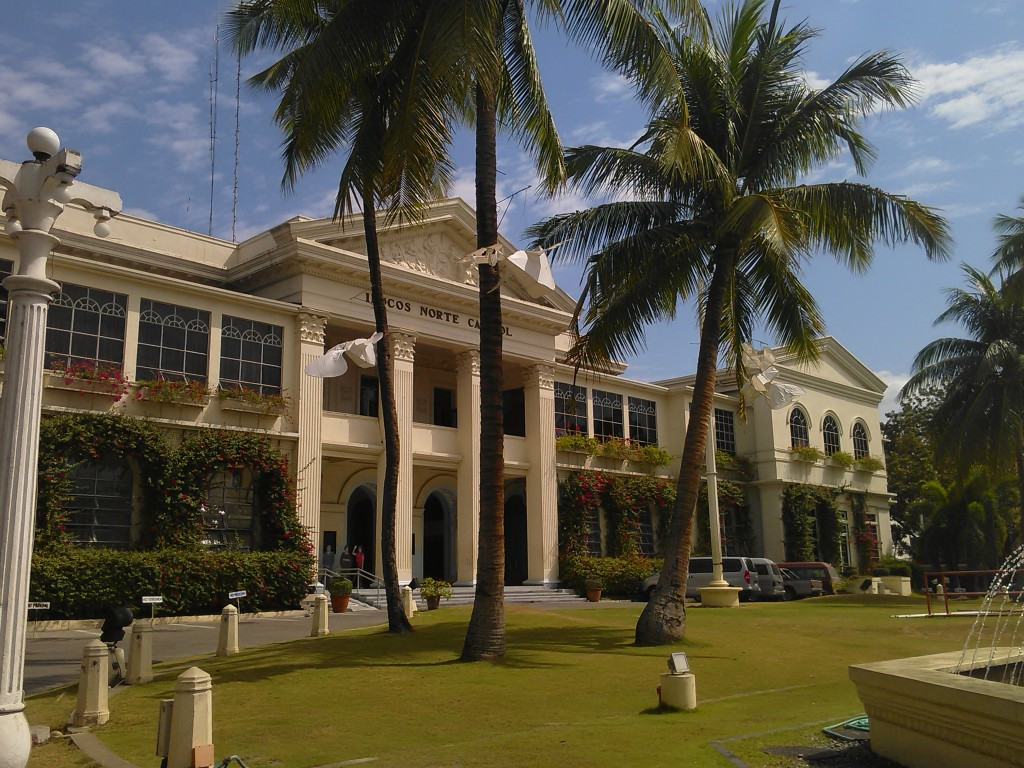
Ilocos Norte Provincial Capitol

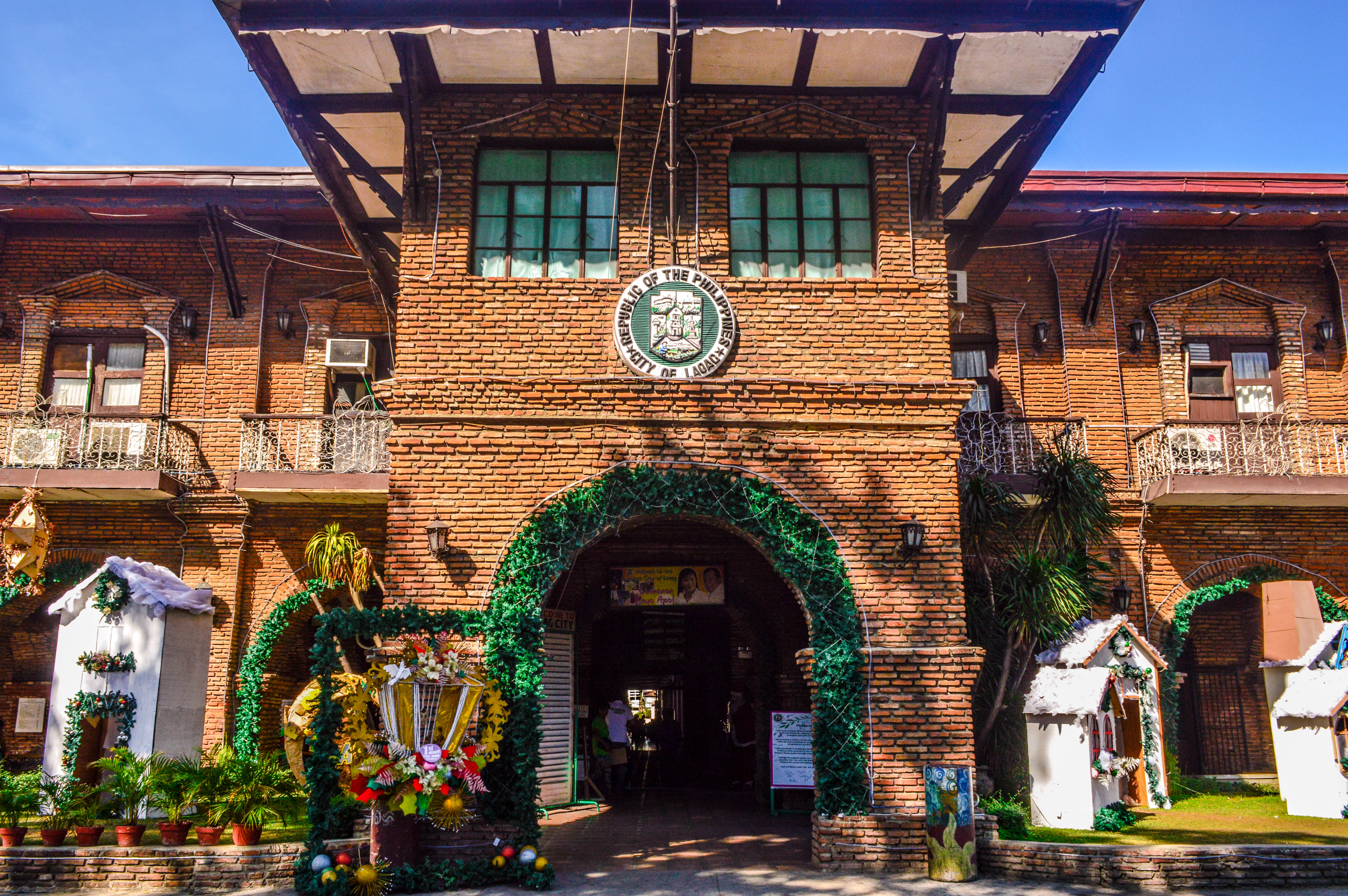
Laoag City Hall

Laoag, belonging to the first congressional district of the province of Ilocos Norte, is governed by a mayor designated as its local chief executive and by a city council as its legislative body in accordance with the Local Government Code. The mayor, vice mayor, and the councilors are elected directly by the people through an election which is being held every three years.

=== Elected officials ===
Laoag City elected officials, term of office June 30, 2025 – June 30, 2028

Mayor	James Bryan Q. Alcid
Vice Mayor	Rey Carlos M. Fariñas
Councilors	Jaybee G. Baquiran; Jeff Ericson P. Fariñas; John Michael V. Fariñas; Juan Conrado A. Respicio II; Enrico F. Ang; Donald G. Nicolas; Jason Bader L. Perera; Justine Clarence G. Chua; Bjorn T. Lao; Edison U. Chua
ABC President	Roque Benjamin C. Ablan
SK Federated President	Michael Christophe R. Agustin

=== City seal ===
Official seal of Laoag City

- Building and Garden — the Ermita Garden and Building on top of the Ermita Hill.
- Bridge — formerly the Gilbert Bridge, recently renamed Marcos Bridge.
- Airport — the Gabu Airport, one of the international airports of the country.
- Tower — the Sinking Tower, one of the oldest and strongest edifices built during the early Spanish Regime.
- Monument — the Tobacco Monopoly Monument, the only one of its kind in the entire country.
- Farmer plowing — symbol of the agricultural industry of the Ilocos Region.

== Tourism ==
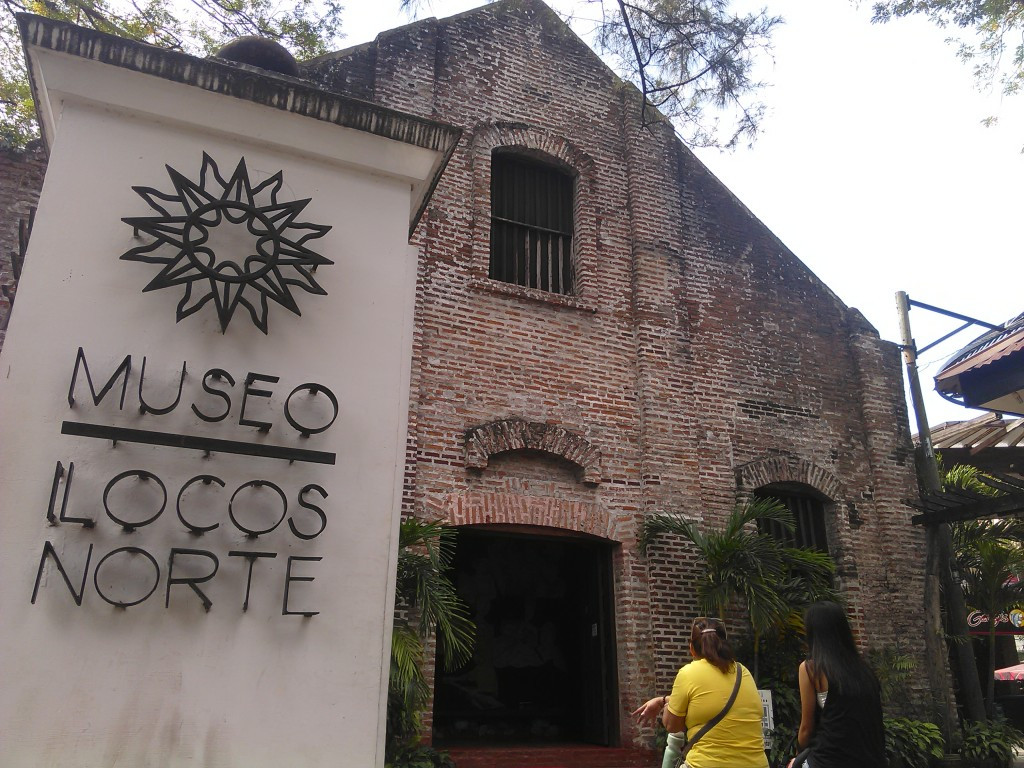
Museo Ilocos Norte

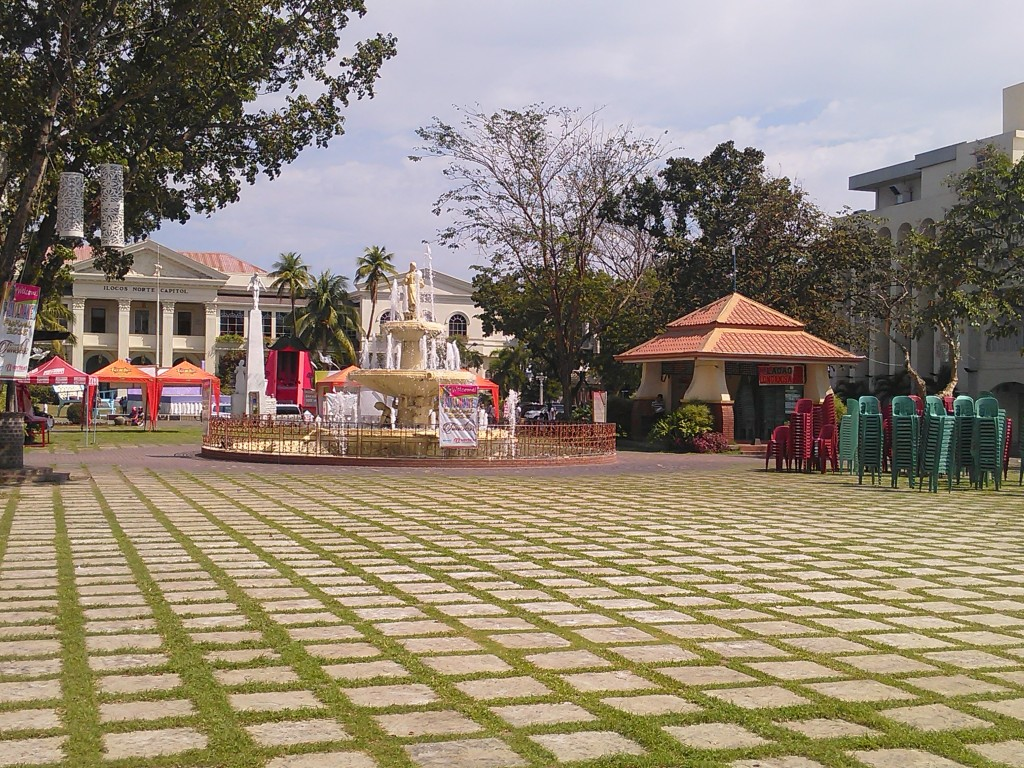
Aurora Park

Tourism has become a major economic driver of Laoag City, paving the way for new commercial investments and infrastructure development. Fort Ilocandia Resort, first and only 5-star hotel in the north, continues to attract foreign and domestic tourists. Other places of interest include a tour of heritage sites featuring Spanish colonial buildings, baroque churches, La Paz Sand Dunes, white-sand beach resorts of Pagudpud, and Marcos-era mansions.

The Laoag Cathedral was built in 1612 by Augustinian friars to replace a wooden chapel. It also serves as the seat or central church of the Roman Catholic Diocese of Laoag. Built with an Italian Renaissance, the church has an unusual two-story façade, supported by two pairs of columns on each side of the arched entrance architecture design and at the top of the facade holds a recessed niche that showcases the image of the city's patron saint, William of Maleval.

The dramatic increase in tourist arrivals also prompted the establishment of a Chinese consulate to oversee the security of Chinese citizens living or visiting the city. A new immigration policy was made to simplify entry of Chinese tourists into the country by issuing visitor visas at the airport upon arrival to entice more guests to come. Laoag City has been named as one of the top tourist destinations in Region I and in the country.

== Transportation ==
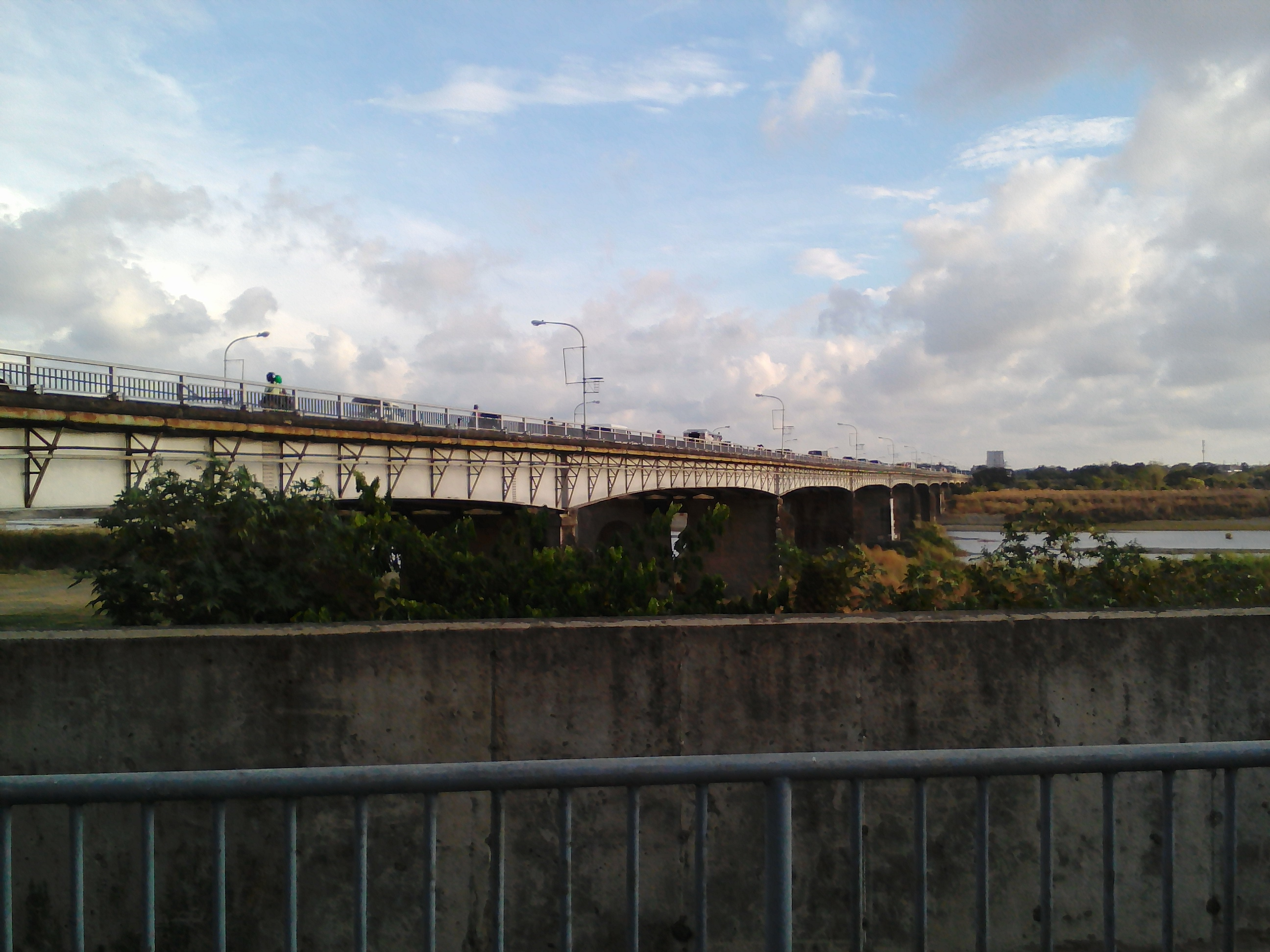
Gilbert Bridge spanning across the Padsan River

Laoag International Airport services flights by PAL Express, Cebu Pacific and Sky Pasada with destinations to and from Manila, Cebu, Calayan Island, and Basco, Batanes. The Honolulu – Laoag vice versa will soon resume its direct flight with Philippine Airlines as its carrier. Foreign airlines offer direct charter flights to Laoag as part of travel packages with optional excursions to tourist destinations outside the city. Tourists can find travel agencies including ticket offices of several airlines at the terminal building.

Several large bus companies serve Laoag City making connections to North and Central Luzon provinces including Metro Manila. These transportation services are provided by GV Florida Transport, Viron Transit, Maria de Leon Bus Lines, Partas and Fariñas Transit Company. Laoag is 487 kilometres (303 mi) from Manila via South Road Access of Laoag and 750 kilometres (470 mi) via North Access of Laoag from Metro Manila.

Mode of transport within the city includes taxi, jeepney, tricycle, and kalesa. Mini buses have daily routes to and from Pagudpud, Batac, Vigan and Carmen among others.

The Laoag bypass linking Paoay on the western part serves as diversion road to long wheeler trucks without crossing the city proper. Another bypass road east of the city is under construction linking Bacarra and San Nicolas towns will help decongest traffic upon completion.

JoyRide PH app can be accessed online offering affordable, convenient and reliable transportation services within the city and drop off to neighboring towns.

== Education ==
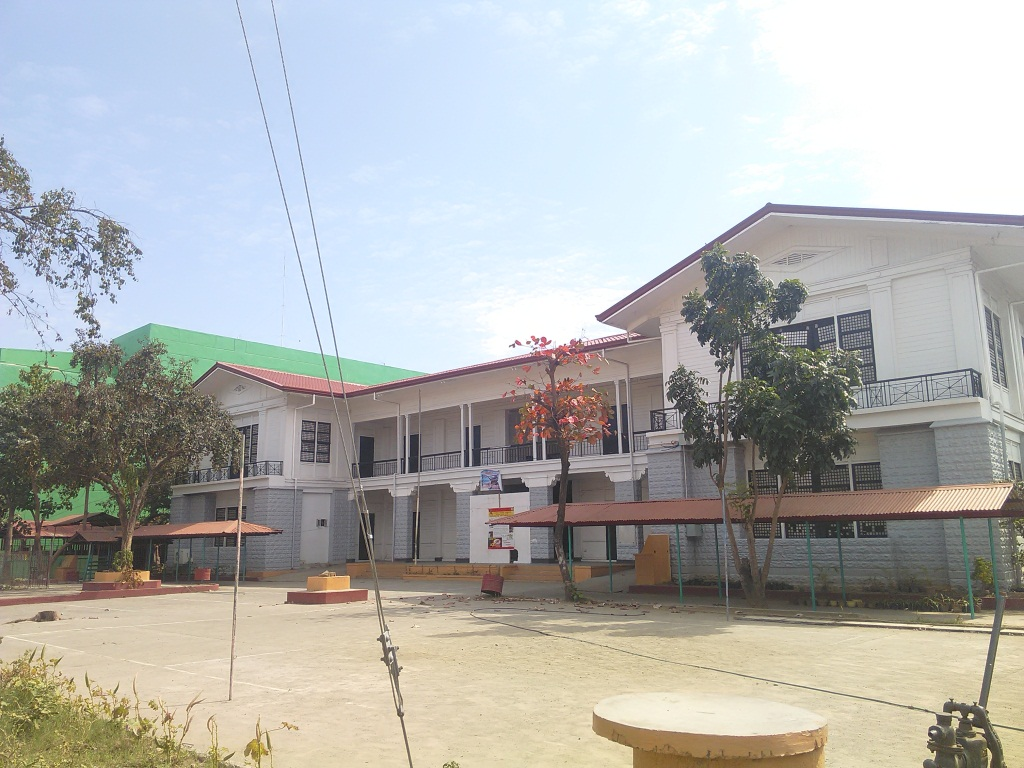
Laoag Central Elementary School

As the provincial capital, Laoag is the center of social and economic activity with almost all major commercial and institutional establishments gravitating towards it. The importance of education in socializing its population is shared by both the local government and the private sector, which has invested heavily in the development of the academic infrastructure.

The Schools Division Office of Laoag City governs all public and private schools within the municipality. There are three schools district offices which manage the operations of elementary schools, namely Laoag City Schools District I Office, Laoag City Schools District II Office, and Laoag City Schools District III Office. Most of the lower-level schools are government-owned. Seventeen private elementary schools are also present including a Chinese school and three laboratory schools. In addition, there are ten private and seven public high schools, and significant rise of integrated schools.

=== Primary and elementary schools ===
- Agripino P. Santos Elementary School
- Alipio N. Ignacio Memorial Elementary School
- Amarosa Elementary School
- Bacsil Elementary School
- Balacad Elementary School
- Barit Elementary School
- Bible Believing Baptist Church Educational Ministries Foundation (Elementary)
- Cabeza Elementary School
- Caaoacan Elementary School
- Calayab Elementary School
- Casili Elementary School
- Cataban Elementary School
- Caterpillar Centre for Early Learners
- Cavit-Araniw Elementary School
- Darayday Elementary School
- Don Galicano R. Rafales Memorial Elementary School
- Emmanuel Fundamental Baptist Learning Center
- Eulalio. F. Siazon Memorial Elementary School
- Faustino Reyes Memorial Elementary School
- Gabaldon Elementary School
- Gabu Elementary School
- Ilocos Norte Adventist School
- Kids' Kollege
- Lagui-Sail Elementary School
- Laoag Central Elementary School
- Laoag Four Square Kindergarten School
- Maranatha Christian School of Laoag
- Mariano Marcos State University-Laboratory Elementary School
- MRS Dayspring Christian School
- Navotas Elementary School
- Our Saviour’s Foundation Inc.
- Pila Elementary School
- Plaridel Elementary School
- Roque B. Ablan Elementary School
- Salet Elementary School
- Saved by Grace Christian Academy
- Shamrock Elementary School
- Sta. Maria Elementary School
- St. Santiago School Foundation
- Sto. Nino Elementary School
- Suyo Elementary School
- Tangid Elementary School
- The Living Gates of Praise Christian School
- The Salvation Army Educational Services
- Vira Elementary School

=== Secondary schools ===
The Rodolfo CG Fariñas Jr. National Science High School which is the second being established in Ilocos Region under the Department of Science and Technology, located in Barangay Vira east of bypass road, has already opened since 2024 for Grades 7, 8 and 9, respectively. The following are full list of secondary schools:

- Balatong Integrated School
- Bible Believing Baptist Church Educational Ministries Foundation
- Buttong Integrated School
- Caaoacan High School
- DWCL Laboratory High School
- Gabu National High School
- Holy Spirit Academy of Laoag
- Ilocos Norte College of Arts and Trades
- Ilocos Norte National High School
- Ilocos Norte Regional School of Fisheries
- International School of the Arts, the Languages, and the Academe
- MMSU Laboratory High School
- Northern Christian College Basic Education School
- Northside Bible Baptist Academy
- NU Laboratory High School
- Our Saviour's Foundation
- Padre Annibale Integrated School
- San Mateo Integrated School
- St. Joseph High School of Laoag
- St. Mary's Seminary

=== Technical and vocational schools ===
Also found in Laoag are vocational schools namely:

- Bel Arte School of Fine Arts
- Lazo Fashion School
- Overseas Technical Institute

=== Higher educational institutions ===
In order to provide continuing education to sustain the economic momentum of the region, the government has established tertiary public learning institutions in the city: the College of Teacher Education (CTE) and the College of Industrial Technology (CIT) of the Mariano Marcos State University.

Other higher education institutions in the city:

- AIE College – Laoag
- AMA Computer College
- Data Center College of the Philippines
- Divine Word College of Laoag
- Mariano Marcos State University
- Northern Christian College
- Northwestern University
- STI College – Laoag

== Media ==
=== Television ===
- DWTE Ch. 2/DTT-18 (TV5) - TV5 Network, Inc.
- D-5-AS Ch. 5/DTT-24 (GMA) - GMA Network, Inc. (Note: Facilities located at San Nicolas, Ilocos Norte)
- Ch. 7 (ALLTV) - Advanced Media Broadcasting System, Inc.
- DWCS Ch. 13/DTT-17 (IBC) - Intercontinental Broadcasting Corporation
- DWHH Ch. 27 (GTV) - GMA Network, Inc.

=== Cable & Satellite ===
- Sky Cable Laoag
- Sunshine Cable TV
- Cignal
- G Sat Direct TV

=== Radio ===
==== AM Stations ====
- DZVR Bombo Radyo Laoag 711 (Bombo Radyo Philippines)
- Aksyon Radyo Laoag 747 (MBC Media Group/Cebu Broadcasting Company)
- Sonshine Radio Laoag 819 (Sonshine Media Network International)
- DZEA Radyo Totoo 909 Laoag (Catholic Media Network)
- DZRH Nationwide 990 Laoag (MBC Media Group)

==== FM Stations ====
- 89.1 AWR Ilocos Norte (Adventist Media)
- 89.9 Brigada News FM Laoag (Brigada Mass Media Corporation)
- 90.7 Love Radio Laoag (MBC Media Group)
- 92.3 Magik FM Laoag (Century Broadcasting Network)
- DWAT 93.9 (Ilocos Norte College of Arts and Trades)
- MOR 95.5 Laoag (ABS-CBN Corporation; Defunct)
- 97.9 XFM Laoag (Southern Broadcasting Network/Y2H Broadcasting Network)
- 99.5 iFM Laoag (Radio Mindanao Network)
- DWFB Radyo Pilipinas Laoag 103.5 (Presidential Broadcast Service)
- 107.5 U-Radio Northwestern University

== Sister cities ==
- (Philippines) Vigan, Ilocos Sur
- (Philippines) Ozamiz, Misamis Occidental
- (Philippines) Caloocan, NCR
- (Philippines) Dagupan, Pangasinan
- Xiamen, China
- Changsha, China
- Laibin, China
- Huangshan, China
- (United States) Honolulu, Hawaii
- (United States) Kauai, Hawaii

== Notable people ==
- Roque Ablan, Sr. – governor of Ilocos Norte and World War II guerilla.
- Fidel Segundo – Filipino brigadier general and World War II hero.
- Severino Montano – National Artist of the Philippines for Literature
- Purificacion Pedro – Filipina social worker and Catholic layman who was killed by soldiers under the Marcos dictatorship. Her name is inscribed in the Bantayog ng mga Bayani.
- Soledad Salvador – Filipina religious worker and activist in the Philippines who fought against the Marcos dictatorship. Her name is inscribed in the Bantayog ng mga Bayani.
- Antonio Zumel – Filipino journalist during the Marcos dictatorship. His name is inscribed in the Bantayog ng mga Bayani.
- Orlando Quevedo – Filipino Catholic cardinal, and Archbishop Emeritus Archdiocese of Cotabato
- Fred Ruiz Castro – 12th Chief Justice of the Supreme Court of the Philippines
- Diosdado Peralta – 26th Chief Justice of the Supreme Court of the Philippines
- Ysabel Ortega – actress

== Bibliography ==
- Dela Torre, Visitacion (2006). The Ilocos Heritage. Makati: Tower Book House. ISBN 978-971-91030-9-7.
- Historical Markers: Regions I-IV and CAR (in Filipino). Manila: National Historical Institute (Philippines). 1993. p. 88. ISBN 9715380611.
