= DXRX =

Radio station in Zamboanga City, Philippines

Radyo Sincero Zamboanga (DXRX)
- Zamboanga City; Philippines
- Broadcast area: Zamboanga City, Basilan and surrounding areas
- Frequency: 93.1 MHz
- Branding: 93.1 Radyo Sincero

Programming
- Languages: Chavacano, Filipino
- Format: Contemporary MOR, OPM, Talk
- Network: Radyo Sincero

Ownership
- Owner: Audiovisual Communicators, Inc.
- Operator: ABJ Broadcasting Services

History
- First air date: 1996
- Former names: Dream Radio (1996–2007); Brigada News FM (2013–2015); Monster Radio Manila relay (2017–2023)
- Call sign meaning: Rx (adapted from Manila station)

Technical information
- Licensing authority: NTC
- Power: 10,000 watts

DXRX (93.1 FM), on-air as 93.1 Radyo Sincero, is a radio station owned by Audiovisual Communicators and operated by ABJ Broadcasting Services. Its studios and transmitter are located along Veterans Ave., Zamboanga City.

== Profile ==
The station was launched in 1996 as Audiovisual Communicators' first provincial station. Branded as Dream Radio RX 93.1, it was the first station in Zamboanga City to carry a Top 40 format. Its office was located at the 3rd Floor, Gold Fountain Centrum along Mayor Jaldon St. It went off the air in January 2007, as its studios and transmitter were already vacated due to rental issues, contract expiration, and poor maintenance inside the building. Since then, ACI has put the station on sale.

In August 2013, Brigada Mass Media Corporation, owner of Brigada Newspaper & its flagship station in General Santos, took over the station's operations and rebranded it to 93.1 Brigada News FM. It became the first FM station in Zamboanga to carry a news and music format. It went on air after the crisis in September 2013 and became the No.1 most-listened FM news and music station in the city.

By the middle of 2015, Brigada News FM transferred to 89.9 FM, which was owned Baycomms Broadcasting Corporation prior to BMMC's acquisition in 2013. Since then, this frequency was inactive until late 2017, when the station was revived as a relay of RX 93.1 in Manila.

In August 2023, ABJ Broadcasting Services took over the station's operations and relaunched it as Radyo Sincero with a news and music format.
