= DXCE =

Radio station in Philippines

Brigada News FM Koronadal (DXCE)
Koronadal; Philippines
- Broadcast area: Northern South Cotabato and surrounding areas
- Frequency: 95.7 MHz
- Branding: 95.7 Brigada News FM

Programming
- Languages: Hiligaynon, Filipino
- Format: Contemporary MOR, News, Talk
- Network: Brigada News FM

Ownership
- Owner: Brigada Mass Media Corporation; (Baycomms Broadcasting Corporation)

History
- First air date: February 18, 2013

Technical information
- Licensing authority: NTC
- Power: 5,000 watts
- ERP: 10,000 watts

Links
- Webcast: Live Stream
- Website: brigada.ph

DXCE (95.7 FM), broadcasting as 95.7 Brigada News FM, is a radio station owned and operated by Brigada Mass Media Corporation. Its studio is located at the 2nd Floor, Janro Glass Bldg., General Santos Dr., Koronadal, and its transmitter is located at Brgy. Paraiso, Koronadal.

== History ==
Formerly owned by Hypersonic Broadcasting Center, Brigada News FM was inaugurated on February 18, 2013. This is the second Brigada station after its flagship station in General Santos. In less than a year, it easily gained wide listenership. As per 2015 KBP-Kantar Media Survey, it is ranked as the over-all #1 Radio Station in Koronadal.

The station was formerly heard in Tacurong via 104.5 FM from March 19, 2018 to November 26, 2023.
