= Brigada (disambiguation) =

Brigada is a Russian television miniseries that debuted in 2002.

Brigada may also refer to:

- Brigada (TV program), a Philippines investigative news television program that has aired on GMA News TV since 2011
- Brigada Siete, investigative news television show in the Philippines from 1993 to 2001
- Brigada Mass Media Corporation, a newspaper company & media network in the Philippines
  - Brigada TV, its television network
  - Brigada News FM, its radio network
    - 89.5 Brigada News FM, its flagship station
