= DYYB =

Brigada News FM Roxas (DYYB)
Roxas City; Philippines
- Broadcast area: Capiz
- Frequency: 95.7 MHz
- Branding: 95.7 Brigada News FM

Programming
- Languages: Cebuano, Filipino
- Format: Contemporary MOR, News, Talk
- Network: Brigada News FM

Ownership
- Owner: Brigada Mass Media Corporation; (Baycomms Broadcasting Corporation)

History
- First air date: August 23, 2023
- Former call signs: DYDJ
- Former frequencies: 107.3 MHz (August 28, 2023–July 14, 2024)

Technical information
- Licensing authority: NTC
- Power: 5 kW

Links
- Webcast: Live Stream
- Website: brigada.ph

95.7 Brigada News FM (DYYB 95.7 MHz) is an FM station owned and operated by Brigada Mass Media Corporation. Its studio and transmitter are located at the 3/F Catalan Bldg., Magallanes St., Brgy. III, Roxas City. The frequency is formerly owned by Century Broadcasting Network.
