= DWEY =

Radio station in Batangas City, Philippines

Brigada News FM Batangas (DWEY)
- Batangas City; Philippines
- Broadcast area: Calabarzon and surrounding areas
- Frequency: 104.7 MHz
- Branding: 104.7 Brigada News FM

Programming
- Language: Filipino
- Format: Contemporary MOR, News, Talk
- Network: Brigada News FM

Ownership
- Owner: Brigada Group; (Baycomms Broadcasting Corporation)

History
- First air date: 1998
- Former names: Bay Radio (1998–2013)
- Call sign meaning: Ernesto Yabut (former owner)

Technical information
- Licensing authority: NTC
- Class: C, D, E
- Power: 10,000 watts
- ERP: 30,000 watts
- Transmitter coordinates: 13°42′27″N 121°10′19″E

Links
- Webcast: Audio Stream
- Website: Official Website

DWEY (104.7 FM), broadcasting as 104.7 Brigada News FM, is a radio station owned and operated by Brigada Group through its licensee Baycomms Broadcasting Corporation. The station's studio is located at the 2nd floor, Transit Point, Batangas City Grand Terminal, Diversion Road, Brgy. Alangilan, Batangas City, while its transmitter is located at Brgy. Talumpok East, Mt. Banoy, Batangas City.

== History ==
=== 1998–2013: Bay Radio ===
It was formerly known as Bay Radio 104.7, the second FM radio station in Batangas, owned by Baycomms Broadcasting Corporation, launched in February 2, 1998, operating everyday from 4:00 a.m. to 12:00 midnight.

One of the notable activities of the station was its Hataw sa Tag-Araw done every February to June where its regular programming switched to summer-oriented shows. 2013 was its last iteration prior to acquisition.

=== 2013–2014: Brigada takeover ===
On October 1, 2013, the station became part of Brigada Mass Media Corporation's acquisition and 100% gradual take-over of Baycomms Broadcasting Corporation then later underwent a soft launch with the borrowed Brigada News FM and Healthline plugs and stingers effective October 28. Prior to the soft launch, most of the in-house personnel were laid off, with some of the displaced being hired by Air1 Radio 91.9 in the process.

On February 1, 2014, the station underwent a test broadcast with the acquisition of better transmitting facilities. On February 24, it was formally relaunched as Brigada News FM Batangas. It continued to use the Batangas studio facility until April 25. The broadcast team, initially, was purely consisted of the remaining Bay Radio hold-overs who did not transfer to other stations in the market. However, it mostly contained music programs and taped Brigada Healthline blocktime programs. It was only during the 1st quarter of 2014 that they started simulcasting Brigada Connection from the network's flagship station in General Santos as a dry run. In mid-April, the station went to another period of test broadcasts, this time, with its Manila link. It was at this point that all Batangas-based personnel were laid off.

=== 2014–2017: Move To Manila ===
On April 28, 2014, the station began its operations at the Manila studio as Brigada News FM Mega Manila, but retaining its old Batangas studio as a technical mediator relaying the entire Manila facility feed. The station also refurbished its audio system through the acquisition of the most advanced state of the art broadcast transmitter and antenna systems from Quark Electronics, that transmits the maximum authorized power and top-of-the-line audio processing equipment called "OMNIA 11". It also expanded into a 24-hour news and music station, and completed transmitter power upgrades from 5 kW to 25 kW (ERP of 127.66 kW) with its move to Manila.

=== 2017–2023: Hybrid feed ===
Coinciding with the respective 12th founding anniversary of the company and 9th anniversary of the establishment of its radio service, the station began implementing a hybrid feed system by transferring most of its news operation to Batangas on October 18, 2017, and reactivating the First Crown studio as its secondary provincial satellite, thereby enabling the station to break Batangas-specific news instantaneously and produce in-house reports from the province, including Banat Brigada and Tira Brigada.

By May 2018, the station relocated its twin broadcast and pharmaceutical services at the Eva Valenton Building in nearby Barangay 23.

At the onset of the coronavirus pandemic, Brigada News FM reduced its daily operations to 18 hours, broadcasting from 4 am to 10 pm. By 2021, it expanded to 20 hours.

=== 2023–present: Downgrade to local programming ===
On July 3, 2023, two days after Brigada News FM National transferred its operations to Mareco-owned 105.1 FM based in Manila, the station was downgraded to a relay station of the latter and reduced its power to 10 kW.

The station began test broadcast on July 20, 2023 with local programming. It was officially relaunched on August 9, 2023, coinciding with the transfer of studios to Transit Point inside the Batangas City Grand Terminal.

On March 31, 2025, Brigada News FM launched its new tagline "Be the Heart of the Delightful Philippines" across all its stations. For DWEY, station management adapted it to promote Batangas City as not just one of the nation's rising tourism-ready cities, but also as the main jump-off to the south thru its Grand Terminal, linking the tourist oriented Mimaropa region and those farther south with Luzon.
