= DXZD =

Radio station in Iligan, Philippines

Brigada News FM Iligan (DXZD)
- Iligan; Philippines
- Broadcast area: Lanao del Norte, parts of Lanao del Sur
- Frequency: 95.1 MHz
- Branding: 95.1 Brigada News FM

Programming
- Languages: Cebuano, Filipino
- Format: Contemporary MOR, News, Talk
- Network: Brigada News FM

Ownership
- Owner: Brigada Mass Media Corporation; (Baycomms Broadcasting Corporation)

History
- First air date: 1993 (as Bay Radio); November 7, 2016 (as Brigada News FM)
- Last air date: 2008 (as Bay Radio)
- Former call signs: DXYI (1993–2008)
- Former names: Bay Radio (1993–2008)

Technical information
- Licensing authority: NTC
- Power: 10 kW

Links
- Webcast: Live Stream
- Website: brigada.ph

95.1 Brigada News FM (DXZD 95.1 MHz) is an FM station owned and operated by Brigada Mass Media Corporation. Its studio and transmitter are located at National Highway, Brgy. Tambo, Iligan.
