= DWYD =

Brigada News FM Daet (DWYD)
Daet; Philippines
- Broadcast area: Camarines Norte
- Frequency: 102.9 MHz
- Branding: 102.9 Brigada News FM

Programming
- Languages: Bicolano, Filipino
- Format: Contemporary MOR, News, Talk
- Network: Brigada News FM

Ownership
- Owner: Brigada Mass Media Corporation; (Baycomms Broadcasting Corporation)

History
- First air date: 1994
- Former names: Bay Radio (1994-2010)

Technical information
- Licensing authority: NTC
- Class: C, D, E
- Power: 10,000 watts

Links
- Webcast: Brigada News FM Daet, CAMNORTE
- Website: http://brigada.ph/

DWYD (102.9 FM), broadcasting as 102.9 Brigada News FM, is a radio station owned and operated by Brigada Mass Media Corporation. Its studio and transmitter are located at the 1st Floor, Kenboy Bldg., Central Plaza Complex, Brgy. Lag-on, Daet.

It was formerly known as Bay Radio from 1994 until 2010, when it went off the air. Since its inception as Brigada News FM on September 18, 2014, it became among the dominant stations in Camarines Norte.
