= DYMG =

Radio station in Bacolod, Philippines

Brigada News FM Bacolod (DYMG)
- Bacolod; Philippines
- Broadcast area: Northern Negros Island, parts of Iloilo and Guimaras
- Frequency: 103.1 MHz
- Branding: 103.1 Brigada News FM

Programming
- Languages: Hiligaynon, Filipino
- Format: Contemporary MOR, News, Talk
- Network: Brigada News FM

Ownership
- Owner: Brigada Mass Media Corporation; (Baycomms Broadcasting Corporation)

History
- First air date: 1978
- Former names: Magik 103 (1978–1999); Y103 (1999–2005); Radyo Kumando (2005–2018)
- Call sign meaning: Magik (Former branding)

Technical information
- Licensing authority: NTC
- Class: C, D, E
- Power: 15,000 watts
- ERP: 20,000 watts

Links
- Webcast: Live Stream
- Website: www.brigadanews.ph

DYMG (103.1 FM), broadcasting as 103.1 Brigada News FM, is a radio station owned and operated by Brigada Mass Media Corporation through its licencee Baycomms Broadcasting Corporation. The station's studio and transmitter are located at Capitol Shopping Center, Benigno S. Aquino Dr., Brgy. Villamonte, Bacolod.

== History ==
The station is the pioneer FM station in Bacolod, inaugurated in 1978. Under the ownership of Westwind Broadcasting Corporation, it was known as Magik 103 with a Top 40 format. In 1999, the station rebranded as Y103. In 2005, the Armed Forces of the Philippines acquired the station and rebranded it as Radyo Kumando with a music & news format. In May 2018, Brigada Mass Media acquired the station and rebranded it as Brigada News FM.
