= DWTY =

Radio station in Olongapo, Philippines

Brigada News FM Olongapo (DWTY)
- Olongapo; Philippines
- Broadcast area: Zambales, Bataan and surrounding areas
- Frequency: 93.5 MHz
- Branding: 93.5 Brigada News FM

Programming
- Language: Filipino
- Format: Contemporary MOR, News, Talk
- Network: Brigada News FM

Ownership
- Owner: Brigada Group; (Baycomms Broadcasting Corporation)

History
- First air date: April 1992
- Former names: Bay Radio (April 1992-April 2015)
- Call sign meaning: Ernesto Torres Yabut (former owner)

Technical information
- Licensing authority: NTC
- Class: C, D, E
- Power: 10,000 watts
- ERP: 20,000 watts
- Repeaters: Iba: DWBD 99.9 MHz; Palauig: DZBB-FM 107.3 MHz

Links
- Webcast: Live Stream
- Website: brigadafm.com/station/name/brigada-news-fm-olongapo

DWTY (93.5 FM), broadcasting as 93.5 Brigada News FM, is a radio station owned and operated by Brigada Mass Media Corporation. Its studio is located at the 2nd floor, RMM Building, 53rd Arthur St., Brgy. West Bajac-Bajac, Olongapo, while its transmitter is located at Kalaklan Ridge, Olongapo.

It was formerly known as Bay Radio under the ownership of Baycomms Broadcasting Corporation from April 1992 to Brigada's acquisition in 2013. Brigada News FM Olongapo officially signed on last April 2015, carrying local programming and hook-up shows with Brigada News FM Manila.
