= DXZC =

Philippine radio station

Brigada News FM Kidapawan (DXZC)
Kidapawan; Philippines
- Broadcast area: Eastern Cotabato and surrounding areas
- Frequency: 97.5 MHz
- Branding: 97.5 Brigada News FM

Programming
- Languages: Hiligaynon, Filipino
- Format: Contemporary MOR, News, Talk
- Network: Brigada News FM

Ownership
- Owner: Brigada Mass Media Corporation; (Baycomms Broadcasting Corporation)

History
- First air date: October 27, 2014
- Former call signs: DXKE

Technical information
- Licensing authority: NTC
- Power: 5 kW
- ERP: 10.5 kW

Links
- Webcast: Live Stream
- Website: www.brigadafm.com/station/name/brigada-news-fm-kidapawan

97.5 Brigada News FM (DXZC 97.5 MHz) is an FM station owned and operated by Brigada Mass Media Corporation. Its studios and transmitter are located at Ground Floor, Aspilla Bldg., Quirino Dr., Kidapawan.
