= DWCO =

XFM Southern Tagalog (DWCO)
- Candelaria; Philippines
- Broadcast area: Quezon and surrounding areas
- Frequency: 103.1 MHz
- Branding: 103.1 XFM

Programming
- Language: Filipino
- Format: Contemporary MOR, News, Talk
- Network: XFM

Ownership
- Owner: Christian Music Power
- Operator: Y2H Broadcasting Network, Inc.

History
- First air date: 1991
- Former call signs: DZKX (1991–2003)
- Former names: Killerbee (1991–2003); The Edge Radio South (2006–2022)
- Former frequencies: 90.3 MHz (2006–2011)

Technical information
- Licensing authority: NTC
- Power: 5,000 watts

DWCO (103.1 FM), broadcasting as 103.1 XFM, is a radio station owned by Christian Music Power and operated by Y2H Broadcasting Network. The station's studio and transmitter is located in Candelaria, Quezon.

== History ==
=== 1991-2003: Killerbee ===
The station was launched in 1991 as Killerbee 103.1 in Lucena. It was owned and operated by Quest Broadcasting Inc. through its licensee Advanced Media Broadcasting System, and aired a CHR/Top 40 format. Among its DJs were Dennis D' Menace, Captain Hook, The Rainman, The Monster, DJ Mike, T-Rex, DJ Tom, Acela Banana, Cookie and Willy K. The station was closed in 2003.

=== 2006-2022: The Edge Radio ===
The Edge Radio began airing in 2006 at 90.3 FM in Lucena, when the UCB formed a partnership with Century Broadcasting Network. In 2011, when Century reformatted the station as mass-based station under the Magik FM network, it transferred to 103.1 FM and rebranded as "The Edge Radio Strong South", maintaining its signal reaching the entire Quezon and its neighbored provinces. The Century-owned Edge Radio stations were later sold to and spun-off into Christian Music Power (CMPI), a broadcast franchisee of UCB in the Philippines.

In May 2013, one of the station's presenters and a blocktimer, Melinda Jennifer Glefonea, was reportedly abducted by 2 unidentified men at a restaurant in the town's proper. However, Quezon police authorities found out that her abduction/kidnapping was actually a set-up by Glefonea herself as she told to the police.

In September 2020, the station partnered with DepEd Pagsanjan as part of the distance learning. It went off air in June 2022.

=== 2023-present: XFM ===
In September 2023, it went back on air under the XFM network under the management of Y2H Broadcasting Network.
