= DWCK =

Magik FM Laoag
- Laoag; Philippines
- Broadcast area: Ilocos Norte and surrounding areas
- Frequency: 92.3 MHz
- Branding: 92.3 Magik FM

Programming
- Languages: Ilocano, Filipino
- Format: Contemporary MOR, OPM
- Network: Magik FM

Ownership
- Owner: Century Broadcasting Network

Technical information
- Licensing authority: NTC
- Power: 10 kW

92.3 Magik FM (DWCK 92.3 MHz) is an FM station owned and operated by Century Broadcasting Network. Its studios and transmitter are located at the 2nd Floor, A&S Bldg., P. Gomez St., Brgy. San Matias, Laoag.
