= DXCK =

Radio station in General Santos, Philippines

iFM General Santos (DXCK)
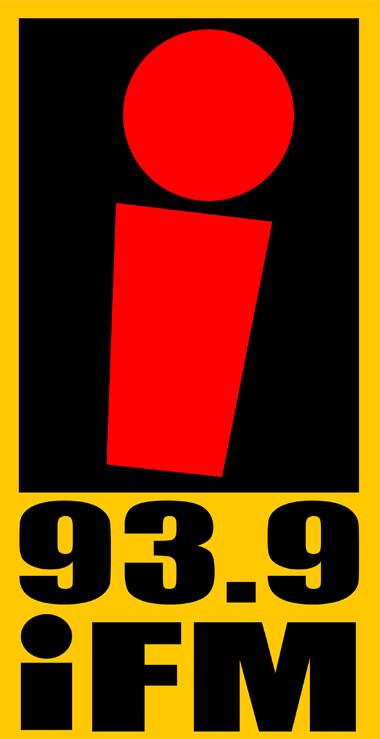
- General Santos; Philippines
- Broadcast area: South Cotabato, Sarangani and surrounding areas
- Frequency: 91.9 MHz
- Branding: 91.9 iFM News

Programming
- Languages: Cebuano, Filipino
- Format: Contemporary MOR, News, Talk
- Network: iFM

Ownership
- Owner: Radio Mindanao Network
- Sister stations: DXMD RMN General Santos

History
- First air date: January 1, 1994

Technical information
- Licensing authority: NTC
- Class: CDE
- Power: 5,000 watts
- ERP: 10,500 watts

Links
- Website: iFM General Santos

DXCK (91.9 FM), broadcasting as 91.9 iFM, is a radio station owned and operated by the Radio Mindanao Network. The station's studio and transmitter are located at the RMN Broadcast Center, Bulaong National Highway, Brgy. Dadiangas North, General Santos.
