= DWED =

Radio station in Legazpi, Philippines

Brigada News FM Legazpi (DWED)
- Legazpi; Philippines
- Broadcast area: Albay and surrounding areas
- Branding: 91.5 Brigada News FM

Programming
- Languages: Albayanon, Filipino
- Format: Contemporary MOR, News, Talk
- Network: Brigada News FM

Ownership
- Owner: Century Broadcasting Network
- Operator: Brigada Mass Media Corporation

History
- First air date: November 5, 2009
- Former call signs: DWML (2009–2015)
- Former names: Magik FM (2009–2012); Radyo Siram (2012–2015); News Rock Radio (2015-2016); Radyo Ninong (2016)

Technical information
- Licensing authority: NTC
- Power: 10,000 watts

Links
- Webcast: Listen Live
- Website: brigadanews.ph

DWED (91.5 FM), broadcasting as 91.5 Brigada News FM, is a radio station owned by Century Broadcasting Network and operated under airtime lease by Brigada Mass Media Corporation. Its studios are located at the 2nd Floor, IDR Bldg., Rizal St., Brgy. Cabangan, Legazpi, Albay, and its transmitter is located in Brgy. Taysan, Legazpi, Albay.

== History ==
The station was inaugurated on November 5, 2009 under the Magik FM network. It aired a mass-based format. On October 5, 2012, it rebranded as Radyo Siram and added news and talk to its programming. In September 2015, it rebranded again as News Rock Radio. In January, it rebranded again as Radyo Ninong.

In August 2016, Brigada Mass Media Corporation took over the station's operations and was relaunched under the Brigada News FM network. In 2024, it transferred its transmitter facilities from Brgy. Estanza to Brgy. Taysan.
