= DXKW (Dipolog) =

Magik FM Dipolog (DXKW)
- Dipolog; Philippines
- Broadcast area: Eastern Zamboanga del Norte
- Frequency: 90.9 MHz
- Branding: 90.9 Magik FM

Programming
- Languages: Cebuano, Filipino
- Format: Contemporary MOR, OPM
- Network: Magik FM

Ownership
- Owner: Century Broadcasting Network

History
- First air date: May 2012

Technical information
- Licensing authority: NTC
- Power: 5 kW

Links
- Webcast: Listen Live

90.9 Magik FM (DXKW 90.9 MHz) is an FM station owned and operated by Century Broadcasting Network. Its studios and transmitter are located at the 2nd Floor, SCT Bldg., General Luna St., Dipolog.
