= Delightful Philippines =

2025 single by Music Travel Love

Single by Music Travel Love
- Language: English
- Released: October 18, 2025
- Genre: Acoustic pop
- Length: 3:28
- Label: Brigada
- Songwriters: Clint Moffatt; Bob Moffatt
- Producers: Clint Moffatt; Bob Moffatt

Music video
- "Delightful Philippines" on YouTube

"Delightful Philippines" is an original song by Canadian music duo Music Travel Love (composed of brothers Clint and Bob Moffatt, formerly of The Moffatts). Released as a tribute to the Philippines, the track serves as both a tourism anthem celebrating various Philippine destinations and the central theme song for a nationwide campaign launched by the Brigada Group.

== Background and release ==
On March 31, 2025, the Brigada Group launched "Delightful Philippines" as its new station movement and official tagline across all nationwide Brigada News FM stations to promote local tourism and sustainable job creation. As part of the initiative, the media network collaborated with Music Travel Love to create an original song and music video featuring footage of major Philippine tourist spots, including Bohol, Boracay, Siargao, and Palawan.

According to Bob Moffatt, the duo was encouraged by a local friend to compose a track dedicated to the country, noting that writing it felt natural due to their long-standing appreciation for their Filipino fanbase dating back to their days with The Moffatts.

In July 2026, Music Travel Love performed "Delightful Philippines" as the grand finale of their Philippine concert tour, closing their Manila show following renditions of classic cover songs.
