= DXZB-FM =

Radio station in Zamboanga City, Philippines

Brigada News FM Zamboanga (DXZB)
- Zamboanga City; Philippines
- Broadcast area: Zamboanga City, Basilan and surrounding areas
- Frequency: 89.9 MHz
- Branding: 89.9 Brigada News FM

Programming
- Languages: Chavacano, Filipino
- Format: Contemporary MOR, News, Talk
- Network: Brigada News FM

Ownership
- Owner: Brigada Mass Media Corporation; (Baycomms Broadcasting Corporation)

History
- First air date: 1992 (as Bay Radio); 2015 (as Brigada News FM)
- Former call signs: DXBY (1992–2013)
- Former frequencies: Brigada News FM: 93.1 (2013–2015)
- Call sign meaning: Zamboanga

Technical information
- Licensing authority: NTC
- Power: 10,000 watts

Links
- Webcast: Live Stream
- Website: http://www.brigadafm.com

DXZB (89.9 FM), broadcasting as 89.9 Brigada News FM, is a radio station owned and operated by Brigada Mass Media Corporation. Its studio and transmitter is located at Brigada News FM Building, Campaner St. Brgy. Zone III, Zamboanga City.

The station was formerly known as Bay Radio from 1992 to 2013, when Brigada acquired Baycomms Broadcasting Corporation. Brigada News FM was formerly on 93.1 FM under an airtime lease with Audiovisual Communicators, Inc. from its inception in August 2013 to the middle of 2015, when it transferred to this frequency.

== Controversies ==
On October 13, 2024, program host Carina Bea dela Cruz shared a post on her Facebook profile expressing her thoughts on the celebration of Nuestra Señora La Virgen del Pilar (commonly known as Fiesta Pilar) within the Fort Pilar Shrine premises. In her post, she suggested that the event “should be observed with dignified solemnities,” which sparked criticism. In response, Fort Pilar Shrine Administrator and Catholic priest Fr. Armand Aquino addressed the matter, emphasizing that while Fiesta Pilar is celebrated with solemnity, it also retains a festive spirit. Following the backlash, Dela Cruz deleted her original post and apologized, acknowledging “the importance of cultural and spiritual symbols for many.” The management of the radio station issued a statement clarifying that “the views expressed were her own and do not represent those of the station,” and confirmed that they had spoken with dela Cruz regarding the incident.
