= DXZA =

Radio station in Cotabato City, Philippines

Brigada News FM Cotabato (DXZA)
Cotabato City; Philippines
- Broadcast area: Maguindanao del Norte and surrounding areas
- Frequency: 89.3 MHz
- Branding: 89.3 Brigada News FM

Programming
- Languages: Maguindanaon, Filipino
- Format: Contemporary MOR, News, Talk
- Network: Brigada News FM

Ownership
- Owner: Brigada Mass Media Corporation; (Baycomms Broadcasting Corporation)

History
- First air date: 1994 (as Bay Radio); February 1, 2014 (as Brigada News FM)
- Former call signs: DXYC (1994-2008)
- Former names: Bay Radio (1994–2008)

Technical information
- Licensing authority: NTC
- Power: 5 kW

Links
- Webcast: Live Stream
- Website: www.brigadafm.com/station/name/brigada-news-fm-cotabato

89.3 Brigada News FM (DXZA 89.3 MHz) is an FM station owned and operated by Brigada Mass Media Corporation. Its studios and transmitter are located at Sinsuat Ave., Cotabato City.
