= DXCP =

Radyo Totoo General Santos (DXCP)
General Santos; Philippines
- Broadcast area: Soccsksargen and surrounding areas
- Frequency: 585 kHz
- Branding: DXCP Radyo Totoo

Programming
- Languages: Cebuano, Filipino
- Format: News, Public Affairs, Talk, Religious Radio
- Affiliations: Catholic Media Network

Ownership
- Owner: South Cotabato Communications Corporation

History
- First air date: 1971
- Call sign meaning: CBCP

Technical information
- Licensing authority: NTC
- Power: 10,000 watts

DXCP (585 AM) Radyo Totoo is a radio station owned and operated by South Cotabato Communications Corporation, the media arm of the Diocese of Marbel. The station's studio and transmitter are located along National Highway, Brgy. Lagao, General Santos.
