= Century Broadcasting Network =

Philippine radio network

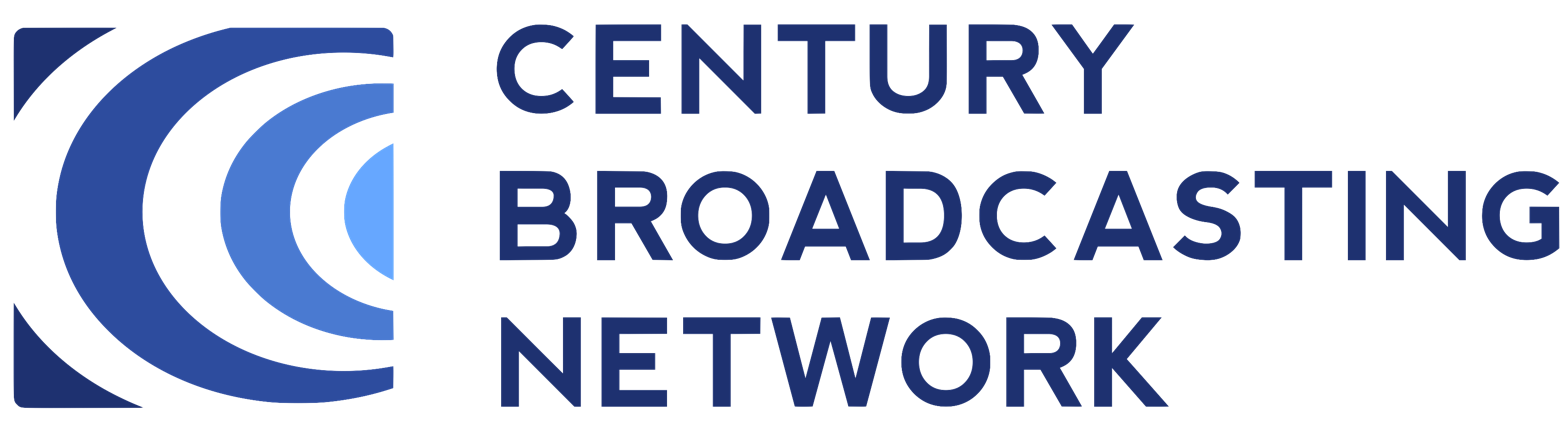
- Type: Private
- Industry: Broadcast
- Founded: January 25, 1985
- Headquarters: Mandaluyong, Metro Manila, Philippines
- Key people: Aimee Billones President & CEO; Victoria Anne Billones Vice President
- Owner: Century Communications Marketing Center, Inc.

Century Broadcasting Network is a Philippine radio network. Its corporate office is located at S-510, Comfoods Bldg., Gil Puyat Ave. cor. Chino Roces Ave., Makati. CBN operates a number of stations across places in the country under the Magik FM branding.

== Profile ==
Century Communications Marketing Center, Inc. was established in 1984 as a broadcast management consultancy firm composed of industry professionals. In 1992, it expanded into FM broadcasting in key provinces under the name Century Broadcasting Network, in which these stations bear the Magik FM brand. Previously, it used to have stations in other cities affiliated with The Edge Radio. They were later on spun-off into its current owner Christian Music Power.

== CBN stations ==
Branding	Callsign	Frequency	Location
Magik FM Laoag	DWCK	92.3 MHz	Laoag
Magik FM Vigan	DWVN	94.1 MHz	Vigan
Magik FM Tuguegarao	DWCN	91.7 MHz	Tuguegarao
Magik FM Cauayan	DWIX	90.5 MHz	Cauayan
Magik FM Lucena	DWMZ	90.3 MHz	Lucena
Brigada News FM Naga (Note: Operated by Brigada Mass Media Corporation.)	DWKM	103.1 MHz	Naga
Brigada News FM Legazpi	DWED	91.5 MHz	Legazpi
Magik FM Tacloban	DYXV	98.3 MHz	Tacloban
Magik FM Dipolog	DXKW	90.9 MHz	Dipolog
Magik FM Butuan	DXMK	97.5 MHz	Butuan

=== Former stations ===
Callsign	Frequency	Location	Current owner
DZKX	103.1 MHz	Lucena	Christian Music Power
DXMA	104.3 MHz	Davao City	Hope Channel Philippines
DXMH	94.3 MHz	Mati	Hope Channel Philippines
