= One San Miguel Avenue =

Office skyscraper in Pasig, Philippines

- Interactive map of the One San Miguel Avenue area

General information
- Status: Completed
- Type: Office
- Location: 1 San Miguel Avenue corner Shaw Boulevard, Ortigas Center, Pasig, Philippines
- Coordinates: 14°34′41.02″N 121°3′27.11″E
- Construction started: 1997
- Completed: 2001
- Opening: 2001
- Owner: Amberland Corporation

Height
- Antenna spire: 203 m (666.01 ft)
- Roof: 183 m (600.39 ft)

Technical details
- Floor count: 54 aboveground, 7 belowground

Design and construction
- Architect: Philip H. Recto Architects
- Developer: Amberland Corporation
- Main contractor: Monolith Construction & Development Corp.

The One San Miguel Avenue is an office skyscraper located at San Miguel Avenue (hence the building's name) in Ortigas Center, Pasig, Philippines. It was completed in 2001 and stands at 183 metres (600.39 feet) from ground up to the architectural top, although if measured with its antennas, it stands at 203 metres (666 feet). It has 54 floors aboveground and 7 basement levels.

== Design and location ==
The One San Miguel Avenue is the first office tower owned and developed by Amberland Corporation, was designed by Filipino architectural firm Philip H. Recto Architects. Located along San Miguel Avenue corner Shaw Boulevard, it is currently one of the highest buildings in Pasig and in Ortigas Center as a whole, and is quite distinguishable due to its height and location. It used to serve office spaces for the Manila Broadcasting Company, which included a transmitter tower for DZMB and DWYS, before transferring technical operation to nearby BSA Twin Towers; as well as the new national headquarters of Brigada Mass Media Corporation, which houses studio facilities for its Luzon flagship DWBM, and to a branch of international BPO company Sykes. It is also near numerous office and residential buildings, as well as major shopping malls like SM Megamall, Shangri-La Plaza, and St. Francis Square.

The building has eight double-decker elevators.

== Amenities ==
The building has 6 basement and 5 aboveground floors for parking of tenants and guests, a canteen at the 9th floor, and Virspacio Coworking Spaces at the 31st floor
