= DXMD =

Radio station in General Santos, Philippines

RMN General Santos (DXMD)
- General Santos; Philippines
- Broadcast area: Soccsksargen and surrounding areas
- Frequency: 927 kHz
- Branding: DXMD RMN General Santos

Programming
- Languages: Cebuano, Filipino
- Format: News, Public Affairs, Talk, Drama
- Network: Radyo Mo Nationwide

Ownership
- Owner: Radio Mindanao Network
- Sister stations: 91.9 iFM

History
- First air date: 1974
- Call sign meaning: Metro Dadiangas

Technical information
- Licensing authority: NTC
- Power: 10,000 watts

Links
- Website: RMN Cagayan De Oro

DXMD (927 AM) RMN General Santos is a radio station owned and operated by the Radio Mindanao Network. The station's studio and transmitter are located along National Hi-way, Brgy. Dadiangas North, General Santos.
