= DXFQ =

Radio station in General Santos, Philippines

Radyo Bandera General Santos (DXFQ)
- General Santos; Philippines
- Broadcast area: South Cotabato, Sarangani and surrounding areas
- Frequency: 103.1 MHz
- Branding: 103.1 Radyo Bandera

Programming
- Languages: Cebuano, Filipino
- Format: Contemporary MOR, News, Talk
- Network: Radyo Bandera

Ownership
- Owner: Bandera News Philippines; (Palawan Broadcasting Corporation)

History
- First air date: October 29, 2016

Technical information
- Licensing authority: NTC
- Power: 10,000 watts

DXFQ (103.1 FM), broadcasting as 103.1 Radyo Bandera, is a radio station owned and operated by Bandera News Philippines. Its studios and transmitter are located at the 2nd Floor, Dinopol Bldg., South Osmeña St., Brgy. Dadiangas South, General Santos. It is Bandera News FM's second station in Mindanao after Bukidnon.
