= DWAR =

DWAR is the callsign of the following radio stations in the Philippines:

- DWAR-AM, 1494 kHz, as Abante by Supreme Broadcasting System (FBS Radio Network)
- DWAR-FM, 103.9 MHz, in Palawan, by Rolin Broadcasting
