= Brigada Group =

Philippine radio network

Brigada Mass Media Corporation
- Type: Private
- Industry: Mass media
- Founded: October 18, 2005
- Headquarters: Brigada Complex; NLSA Road, Brgy. San Isidro, General Santos, Philippines; National Broadcast Center; One San Miguel Avenue Bldg., San Miguel Avenue corner Shaw Boulevard, Ortigas Center, Pasig City, Philippines
- Key people: Elmer Catulpos (Representative, 1Tahanan Partylist and Chairman and CEO, Brigada Group of Companies)
- Subsidiaries: Baycomms Broadcasting Corporation; Brigada Healthline; Dynamic Force Security Agency; Brigada Pharmacy
- Website: http://brigada.ph

BrigadaTV
- Type: Broadcast television network
- Country: Philippines
- Broadcast area: Philippines
- Owner: Brigada Group of Companies
- Launch date: October 18, 2012
- Picture format: 480i (4:3 SDTV); 16:9 (1080i, HDTV)
- Language: Filipino (main); English (secondary)

The Brigada Group of Companies is a Filipino conglomerate, with interests in mass media, consumer goods, distribution of herbal food supplements, medicines, cosmetics and engine care products, among others. It runs newspaper editions in Mindanao, a network of FM stations across the Philippines and one TV station through its subsidiary, Brigada Mass Media Corporation (BMMC).

== History ==
Brigada was founded by former Bombo Radyo General Santos anchor; independent news publisher; and now Brigada News Philippines President and Chief-Executive Officer Elmer Catulpos.

Its main office is in General Santos, but the company also has offices in Davao and Cagayan de Oro, with its own edition each. It has a combined daily circulation of 21,000 copies sold, practically covering the entire Mindanao region. As of October 18, 2023, the newspaper has stopped its circulation.

In April 2007, 2 years after the birth of Brigada News Philippines, Brigada Healthline Marketing was established as distributor of health products that the company advertised in its daily newspaper and block time radio programs.

Since February 2013, Brigada News FM has expanded to 25 cities and municipalities in the Philippines through its subsequent acquisition and 100% takeover of Baycomms Broadcasting Corporation, its owned and operated stations and other smaller radio networks.

In April 2014, Brigada News FM National Offices in Makati was inaugurated and relocated Brigada News FM Batangas to become Brigada News FM National, which later moved to Mareco-owned 105.1 in July 2023, and completing the three broadcast centers of the network, Manila, Cebu and General Santos.

On March 31, 2025, Brigada Group launched its new tagline "Delightful Philippines" for all its FM stations and launched its music video featuring Music Travel Love that promoting local tourism and sustainable job creation within the cities that host BNFM stations.

== Brigada News FM ==
Brigada News FM
- Type: Broadcast FM radio network (News/Talk, Contemporary MOR, OPM)
- Country: Philippines
- Availability: National
- Founded: October 2009
- Motto: Brigada, In The Heart of Changing Lives; The Music and News Authority
- Official website: www.brigadanews.ph

=== Overview ===
Brigada News FM stations are collectively known as Brigada News FM Philippines. Currently, Brigada News FM has more than 50 owned and operated FM stations across the country, the most number of stations for a news-formatted radio network compared to their other networks in AM radio and more are planned to be opened.

=== Stations ===
Luzon

Branding	Callsign	Frequency	Location
Brigada News FM Manila	DWBM	105.1 MHz	Mega Manila
Brigada News FM Manila	DZBM	105.1 MHz	Baguio
Brigada News FM Cauayan	DWVA	92.9 MHz	Cauayan
Brigada News FM Olongapo	DWTY	93.5 MHz	Olongapo
Brigada News FM Olongapo	DZBB	107.3 MHz	Palauig
Brigada News FM Olongapo	DWBD	99.9 MHz	Iba
Brigada News FM Batangas	DWEY	104.7 MHz	Batangas City
Brigada News FM Lucena	DWKL	92.7 MHz	Lucena
Brigada News FM Mindoro	DWBY	93.3 MHz	Roxas, Oriental Mindoro
Brigada News FM Puerto Princesa	DWYO	103.1 MHz	Puerto Princesa
Brigada News FM Narra	DZBI	96.5 MHz	Narra
Brigada News FM Brooke's Point	DWBP	103.7 MHz	Brooke's Point
Brigada News FM Quezon	DWYB	98.3 MHz	Quezon, Palawan
Brigada News FM Coron	PA	101.3 MHz	Coron
Brigada News FM Roxas, Palawan	DWBJ	100.5 MHz	Roxas, Palawan
Brigada News FM Legazpi	DWED	91.5 MHz	Legazpi
Brigada News FM Naga	DWKM	103.1 MHz	Naga
Brigada News FM Naga	DZBC	87.7 MHz	Goa
Brigada News FM Sorsogon	DWLH	101.5 MHz	Sorsogon City
Brigada News FM Daet	DWYD	102.9 MHz	Daet

Visayas

Branding	Callsign	Frequency	Location
Brigada News FM Cebu	DYAC	90.7 MHz	Cebu City
Brigada News FM Roxas	DYYB	95.7 MHz	Roxas, Capiz
Brigada News FM Kalibo	DYYQ	89.3 MHz	Kalibo
Brigada News FM Antique	DYET	104.5 MHz	San Jose
Brigada News FM Bacolod	DYMG	103.1 MHz	Bacolod
Brigada News FM Kabankalan	DYYE	99.7 MHz	Kabankalan
Brigada News FM San Carlos	DYBA	89.3 MHz	San Carlos
Brigada News FM Dumaguete	DYBW	89.5 MHz	Dumaguete
Brigada News FM Toledo	DYBD	88.5 MHz	Toledo
Brigada News FM Bogo	DYMM	90.9 MHz	Bogo

Mindanao

Branding	Callsign	Frequency	Location
Brigada News FM General Santos	DXYM	89.5 MHz	General Santos
Brigada News FM Zamboanga	DXZB	89.9 MHz	Zamboanga City
Brigada News FM Pagadian	DXVV	105.7 MHz	Pagadian
Brigada News FM Dipolog	DXIO	107.7 MHz	Dipolog
Brigada News FM Cagayan de Oro	DXMM	102.5 MHz	Cagayan de Oro
Brigada News FM Iligan	DXZD	95.1 MHz	Iligan
Brigada News FM Valencia	DXBX	105.7 MHz	Valencia
Brigada News FM Oroquieta	DXBK	95.3 MHz	Oroquieta
Brigada News FM Davao	DXAC	93.1 MHz	Davao City
Brigada News FM Davao	DXGJ	90.3 MHz	Digos
Brigada News FM Tagum	DXBY	97.5 MHz	Tagum
Brigada News FM Mati	DXBW	103.1 MHz	Mati
Brigada News FM Koronadal	DXCE	95.7 MHz	Koronadal
Brigada News FM Kidapawan	DXZC	97.5 MHz	Kidapawan
Brigada News FM Lebak	DXBI	91.3 MHz	Lebak
Brigada News FM Cotabato	DXZA	89.3 MHz	Cotabato City
Brigada News FM Butuan	DXVA	96.7 MHz	Butuan
Brigada News FM Agusan	DXYD	105.5 MHz	Trento
Brigada News FM Siargao	PA	90.5 MHz	Dapa

A majority of BMMC's stations were acquired from Baycomms (prior to the merger in 2013), hence becoming Brigada's official broadcast licensee, except the following stations that are either acquired or operated under airtime lease agreements:

- DWBM Manila, DYAC Cebu, and DXAC Davao: Owned by Mareco Broadcasting Network.
- DWKM Naga, DWED Legazpi: Owned by Century Broadcasting Network.
- DWLH Sorsogon: Acquired from Hypersonic Broadcasting Center.
- DYMG Bacolod: Acquired from the Armed Forces of the Philippines.
- DZBM Baguio: Acquired from Mareco Broadcasting Network.
- Brigada News FM Zamboanga first utilized 93.1 FM under airtime lease from Audiovisual Communicators Inc. in 2013 before moving to Baycomms-owned 89.9 FM in 2015.

== Brigada TV ==
Analog Free TV

Branding	Callsign	Channel	Power	Type	Location
Brigada TV	DXBC	39	10 kW	Originating	General Santos

Digital Free TV

Branding	Callsign	Ch. #	Frequency	Power	Type	Area of Coverage
Brigada TV	DXBC	37	611.143 MHz	500 watts	Originating	General Santos

Cable TV

Cable/Satellite	Channel	Location
Marbel Cable	21	Koronadal
Sky Cable Gensan	35	General Santos
JVL Star Cable	15	Koronadal
Sky Cable Polomolok	15	Polomolok
Sky Cable Maguindanao	44	Maguindanao del Norte/Maguindanao del Sur/Cotabato

== Other products ==
Unlike other media entities, Brigada Mass Media does not rely on as much third-party advertisements compared to other major radio stations. All radio commercials except for competing pharmaceutical products (i.e. Unilab products) are generally allowed to be advertised in the station. Following the acquisition of the 105.1 Metro Manila frequency, disclaimers (i.e. Mahalagang Paalala ...) in radio commercials have been improved to more closely follow other radio commercials. Brigada News FM and TV stations acts as a sales and marketing arm of these Healthline products under the Brigada Healthline Corporation. Brigada Healthline products are also aired as an early morning blocktimer on 91.5 Win Radio Manila as of 2017.

=== Others ===
- Brigada DigiTV, its own digital set-top-box introduced and launched in February 2024 and currently available in General Santos and surrounding areas.
