= DXYM =

Radio station in General Santos, Philippines

Brigada News FM General Santos (DXYM)
- General Santos; Philippines
- Broadcast area: South Cotabato, Sarangani and surrounding areas
- Frequency: 89.5 MHz
- Branding: 89.5 Brigada News FM

Programming
- Languages: Cebuano, Filipino
- Format: Contemporary MOR, News, Talk
- Network: Brigada News FM

Ownership
- Owner: Brigada Mass Media Corporation; (Baycomms Broadcasting Corporation)
- Sister stations: Brigada TV-39

History
- First air date: 1997
- Former names: Bay Radio (1997–2009)

Technical information
- Licensing authority: NTC
- Power: 10,000 watts
- ERP: 30,000 watts
- Transmitter coordinates: 6°08′08″N 125°10′55″E

Links
- Webcast: Live Stream
- Website: www.brigadanews.ph

DXYM (89.5 FM), broadcasting as 89.5 Brigada News FM, is a radio station owned and operated by Brigada Mass Media Corporation. It serves as the main flagship station of Brigada News FM. Its studio and transmitter are located at the 2nd floor, Brigada Complex, NLSA Rd., Brgy. San Isidro, General Santos.

== Profile ==
The station was established in 1997 as Bay Radio in Koronadal. In 2003, the station transferred to Bernabe Coliseum along J. Catolico Ave., General Santos, the former home of DXRE and DXOO.

In October 18, 2009, during its 4th foundation anniversary, Brigada News bought the station's operations under a leasing agreement and became the nucleus of Brigada News FM. It introduced a mix of AM's news and public affairs with traditional FM programming anchored by personalities from various radio networks in the local market. In 2011, Brigada News FM became the most listened radio station in the city. At the same year, it moved to its current home in Brigada Complex, NLSA Road. In 2013, Brigada acquired station owner Baycomms, making it official as an O&O station.
