= Baycomms Broadcasting Corporation =

Philippine radio network

- Type: Subsidiary
- Industry: Broadcasting
- Founded: April 17, 1992
- Founder: Ernesto Yabut
- Headquarters: 26th Floor, One San Miguel Avenue Bldg., San Miguel Avenue corner Shaw Boulevard, Ortigas Center, Pasig, Philippines
- Key people: Elmer Catulpos (Pres. and CEO, Brigada Group of Companies)
- Parent: Brigada Mass Media Corporation
- Website: brigada.ph

Baycomms Broadcasting Corporation (BBC) is a Philippine broadcast media company. Formerly a radio network which operated a number of stations across regional areas in the Philippines under the Bay Radio branding, it currently serves as the license holder for majority of the stations under the Brigada News FM of Brigada Mass Media Corporation, which acquired the company in 2013.

The network never had a Bay Radio station in Metro Manila, Cebu and Davao during its existence.

== History ==
Baycomms Broadcasting Corporation was founded in 1992 by Ernesto Yabut, with 93.5 FM in Olongapo & 89.9 FM in Zamboanga City.

Financial struggles would later hound the network as within the late 2000s, a number of Bay Radio stations were either sold to other networks or continue with operation cuts. Among those were DXRK Cagayan de Oro, which was sold to Hypersonic Broadcasting Center in 2011 & became Magnum Radio 99.9, and DXYM General Santos, which became the nucleus of Brigada News FM in 2009.

In February 2013, Baycomms was acquired by Brigada Mass Media Corporation from the group of the network's founder Ernesto Yabut. Soon, its stations started carrying the brand Brigada News FM.

On June 24, 2021, Philippine President Rodrigo Duterte signed Republic Act No. 11555 which renewed Baycomms's legislative franchise for another 25 years. The law granted Baycomms a franchise to construct, install, establish, operate, and maintain for commercial purposes and in the public interest, radio and television broadcasting stations, including digital and pay television system, through microwave, satellite or whatever means, as well as the use of any new technology in television and radio systems, with the corresponding technological auxiliaries and facilities, special broadcast and other program and distribution services and relay stations in the Philippines.
