= List of radio stations in Caraga =

Below is a list of radio stations in Caraga Region in the Philippines, whose coverage is in part or whole of the same.

== Agusan del Norte ==
=== AM stations ===
| Frequency | Name | Company | Format | Call Sign | Power | Location Covered |
|---|---|---|---|---|---|---|
| 693 AM | RMN Butuan | Radio Mindanao Network | Drama, News, Public Affairs, Talk | DXBC | 5 KW | Butuan |
| 792 AM | Radyo Pilipinas Butuan | Presidential Broadcast Service | Government Radio, News, Public Affairs, Talk | DXBN | 5 KW | Butuan |
| 981 AM | Bombo Radyo Butuan | People's Broadcasting Service (Bombo Radyo Philippines) | Drama, News, Public Affairs, Talk | DXBR | 10 KW | Butuan |

=== FM stations ===
| Frequency | Name | Company | Format | Call Sign | Power | Location Covered |
|---|---|---|---|---|---|---|
| 89.5 FM | Kabayaning Michaelinian FM | Saint Michael College of Caraga | Community radio | DXSM | 5 KW | Nasipit |
| 90.1 FM | Infinite Radio Butuan | St. Jude Thaddeus Institute of Technology | Contemporary MOR, News, Talk | DXKA | 10 KW | Butuan |
| 92.5 FM | Arellius News FM | —N/a | contemporary MOR, news, talk | —N/a | 5 KW | Butuan |
| 93.5 FM | Hope Radio Butuan | Digital Broadcasting Corporation (Adventist Media) | religion | DXIM | 5 KW | Butuan |
| 94.3 FM | Radyo Serbisyo | —N/a | Community radio | DXQI | 5 KW | Nasipit |
| 95.1 FM | Love Radio Butuan | Cebu Broadcasting Company (MBC Media Group) | Contemporary MOR, OPM | DXMB | 10 KW | Butuan |
| 95.9 FM | One FM Butuan | Radio Corporation of the Philippines (Radyo Pilipino Media Group) | Contemporary MOR, OPM | DXPQ | 5 KW | Butuan |
| 96.7 FM | Brigada News FM Butuan | Baycomms Broadcasting Corporation (Brigada Mass Media Corporation) | Contemporary MOR, News, Talk | DXVA | 5 KW | Butuan |
| 97.5 FM | Magik FM Butuan | Century Broadcasting Network | Contemporary MOR, OPM | DXMK | 5 KW | Butuan |
| 98.5 FM | Wild FM Butuan | UM Broadcasting Network | contemporary MOR, dance, original Pilipino music | DXBB | 5 kW | Butuan |
| 99.7 FM | Heat Radio Cabadbaran | Hypersonic Broadcasting Center (JCY Holdings Corporation) | Contemporary MOR, News, Talk | —N/a | 5 KW | Cabadbaran |
| 100.1 FM | Honey FM | —N/a | Community radio | —N/a | 5 KW | Cabadbaran |
| 100.7 FM | iFM Butuan | Radio Mindanao Network | Contemporary MOR, News, Talk | DXXX | 5 kW | Butuan |
| 101.7 FM | FMR Butuan | Philippine Collective Media Corporation | Contemporary News, Talk | —N/a | 10 kW | Butuan |
| 102.1 FM | Gold Radio Jabonga | —N/a | Community radio | —N/a | 5 KW | Jabonga |
| 102.3 FM | Radyo Sincero Butuan | ABJ Broadcasting Services | Contemporary MOR, News, Talk | DXNS | 5 kW | Butuan |
| 103.1 FM | Click Radio Butuan | Hypersonic Broadcasting Center (operated by JCY Holdings Corporation) | Contemporary MOR, News, Talk | DXAM | 5 kW | Butuan |
| 104.5 FM | Gold Radio Cabadbaran | —N/a | Community radio | —N/a | 5 kW | Cabadbaran |
| 104.7 FM | K5 News FM Butuan | 5K Broadcasting Network (Palawan Broadcasting Corporation) | Contemporary MOR, News, Talk | DXBG | 5 kW | Butuan |
| 105.3 FM | Radyo Natin Cabadbaran | MBC Media Group | Community radio, Music | DXRU | 3 kW | Cabadbaran |

== Agusan del Sur ==
=== FM stations ===
| Frequency | Name | Company | Format | Call Sign | Power | Location Covered |
|---|---|---|---|---|---|---|
| 88.5 FM | Flash FM | —N/a | Community radio | —N/a | 5 KW | San Francisco |
| 89.7 FM | Agusan Radio | Agusan del Sur Broadcasting Service | News, Talk, Music | DXGP | 5 KW | Prosperidad |
| 90.3 FM | Smile FM | —N/a | Community radio | —N/a | 5 KW | Bayugan |
| 91.1 FM | Radyo Esperanza | —N/a | Community radio | —N/a | 5 KW | Esperanza |
| 91.3 FM | XFM San Francisco | Y2H Broadcasting Network | Contemporary MOR, News, Talk | DXCV | 5 KW | San Francisco |
| 91.7 FM | Rock FM | —N/a | Community radio | —N/a | 5 KW | Bayugan |
| 92.3 FM | Metro FM | —N/a | Community radio | —N/a | 5 KW | Prosperidad |
| 92.7 FM | Radyo Pilipinas | Iddes Broadcast Group | Contemporary MOR, News, Talk | —N/a | 5 KW | San Francisco |
| 92.9 FM | Top Radio | —N/a | Community radio | —N/a | 5 KW | Bayugan |
| 93.1 FM | Radyo Tribu | —N/a | Community radio | —N/a | 5 KW | Talacogon |
| 93.5 FM | Pure FM | Hypersonic Broadcasting Center (JCY Holdings Corporation) | Contemporary MOR, News, Talk | —N/a | 5 KW | San Francisco |
| 94.1 FM | Big Radio | —N/a | Community radio | —N/a | 5 KW | Bayugan |
| 94.3 FM | 4n Radio Power | —N/a | Community radio | —N/a | 5 KW | San Francisco |
| 94.5 FM | Radyo Bandera Trento | Palawan Broadcasting Corporation (Bandera News Philippines) | Contemporary MOR, News, Talk | DXEG | 5 KW | Trento |
| 94.7 FM | Express Radio | —N/a | Community radio | —N/a | 5 KW | La Paz |
| 94.9 FM | Lucky Radio | —N/a | Community radio | —N/a | 5 KW | Bayugan |
| 95.3 FM | Ace FM | —N/a | Community radio | —N/a | 5 KW | Trento |
| 95.5 FM | Kuyaw FM | —N/a | Community radio | —N/a | 5 KW | San Francisco |
| 95.7 FM | XFM Bayugan | Capitol Broadcasting Center (Y2H Broadcasting Network, Inc.) | Contemporary MOR, News, Talk | —N/a | 5 kW | Bayugan |
| 96.5 FM | Mix FM | —N/a | Community radio | —N/a | 5 KW | Santa Josefa |
| 96.9 FM | Uptown Radio | —N/a | Community radio | —N/a | 5 KW | La Paz |
| 97.3 FM | Edge Radio Trento | Christian Music Power | Gospel, Talk | DXYX | 5 KW | Trento |
| 97.9 FM | Infinite FM San Francisco | St. Jude Thaddeus Institute of Technology | Contemporary MOR, News, Talk | —N/a | 5 KW | San Francisco |
| 98.1 FM | Juander Radyo Trento | Malindang Broadcasting Network Corporation (operated by RSV Broadcasting Network) | Contemporary MOR, News/Talk | —N/a | 5 KW | Trento |
| 98.7 FM | Disaster Radio | —N/a | Community radio | —N/a | 5 KW | Talacogon |
| 98.9 FM | Radio Gracia | —N/a | Community radio | —N/a | 5 KW | Santa Josefa |
| 99.5 FM | Kings Radio San Francisco | KAMM Media Network | News, Talk, Music | —N/a | 5 KW | San Francisco |
| 99.5 FM | Gold FM Bayugan | Kalayaan Broadcasting System, Inc. | Contemporary MOR, OPM | —N/a | 5 KW | Bayugan |
| 99.7 FM | Bio FM | —N/a | Community radio | —N/a | 5 KW | Bunawan |
| 100.1 FM | Nonglading Infinite Radio | St. Jude Thaddeus Institute of Technology | Contemporary MOR, OPM | DXOJ | 5 KW | San Francisco |
| 100.1 FM | City FM | —N/a | Community radio | —N/a | 5 KW | Bayugan |
| 100.1 FM | Infinite FM Rosario | St. Jude Thaddeus Institute of Technology | Contemporary MOR, News, Talk | —N/a | 5 KW | Rosario |
| 101.1 FM | Sky FM | —N/a | Community radio | —N/a | 5 KW | San Francisco |
| 101.3 FM | Radyo Bandera Bayugan | Palawan Broadcasting Corporation (Bandera News Philippines) | Contemporary MOR, News, Talk | DXFT | 5 KW | Bayugan |
| 101.9 FM | Bagat Tribal Radio | —N/a | Community radio | —N/a | 5 KW | Sibagat |
| 102.3 FM | Metro FM | —N/a | Contemporary MOR, News, Talk | —N/a | 1 KW | Rosario |
| 104.5 FM | Radyo Trento | Hypersonic Broadcasting Center (operated by JCY Holdings Corporation) | Contemporary MOR, News, Talk | | 5 KW | Trento |
| 104.9 FM | Radyo Natin San Francisco | MBC Media Group | Community Radio | DXRY | 5 KW | San Francisco |
| 105.5 FM | Brigada News FM Trento | Baycomms Broadcasting Corporation (operated by Brigada Mass Media Corporation) | News, Talk, Music | DXYD | 5 KW | Trento |
| 105.7 FM | Radyo Natin Bayugan | MBC Media Group | Community Radio | DXRW | 5 KW | Bayugan |
| 106.3 FM | Kuyaw FM Rosario | —N/a | Community radio | —N/a | 5 KW | Rosario |
| 106.5 FM | Radyo Kidlat | Presidential Broadcast Service (operated by ASELCO) | Music, News | DXPI | 5 KW | San Francisco |
| 107.3 FM | Radyo Kaagapay | National Nutrition Council (operated by Municipality of Sibagat) | Community radio | DXCN | 0.5 KW | Sibagat |

== Surigao del Norte ==
=== AM stations ===
| Frequency | Name | Company | Format | Call Sign | Power | Location Covered |
|---|---|---|---|---|---|---|
| 918 AM | RMN Surigao | Radio Mindanao Network | News, Public Affairs, Talk, Drama | DXRS | 10 kW | Surigao |
| 1080 AM | Radyo Ronda Surigao | Radio Philippines Network | News, Public Affairs, Talk | DXKS | 5 KW | Surigao |

=== FM stations ===
| Frequency | Name | Company | Format | Call Sign | Power | Location Covered |
|---|---|---|---|---|---|---|
| 87.7 FM | Radyo Alerto | —N/a | Contemporary MOR, News, Talk | —N/a | 5 KW | Claver |
| 88.1 FM | Banat FM | —N/a | Contemporary MOR, News, Talk | —N/a | 5 KW | Placer |
| 89.3 FM | FMR Bagtik Radio | Philippine Collective Media Corporation | Contemporary MOR, News, Talk | DXDU | 10 KW | Surigao |
| 91.1 FM | Claver FM | —N/a | Community radio | DXJE | 5 KW | Claver |
| 92.3 FM | ABS FM Radio Socorro | | Community radio | | 5 KW | Socorro |
| 92.5 FM | Radyo Suyog | Surigao Broadcasting Services | Community radio | | 5 KW | Surigao |
| 92.7 FM | Nico's FM | —N/a | Community Radio | —N/a | 5 KW | Siargao |
| 93.1 FM | Heart FM Siargao | —N/a | Community Radio | —N/a | 5 KW | Siargao |
| 93.3 FM | Infinite Radio Surigao | St. Jude Thaddeus Institute of Technology | Contemporary MOR, News, Talk | DXSJ | 5 KW | Surigao |
| 94.1 FM | iFM Surigao | Radio Mindanao Network | Contemporary MOR, News, Talk | DXKE | 5 KW | Surigao |
| 94.9 FM | Joy FM Surigao | Iddes Broadcast Group | Contemporary MOR, Talk | DXYL | 5 KW | Surigao |
| 95.7 FM | Click FM | Skia Broadcasting Center | Contemporary MOR, News, Talk | | 5 KW | Claver |
| 96.1 FM | One FM Surigao | Radio Corporation of the Philippines | Contemporary MOR, News, Talk | DXSP | 5 KW | Surigao |
| 97.3 FM | Juander Radyo Surigao | Rizal Memorial Colleges Broadcasting Corporation (operated by RSV Broadcasting Network Incorporated) | Contemporary MOR, News, Talk | —N/a | 5 KW | Surigao |
| 97.7 FM | Radyo Kabakhawan | National Nutrition Council (operated by the Municipal Government of Del Carmen; part of the Nutriskwela Community Radio network) | Community Radio | DXNG | 1 KW | Del Carmen |
| 98.1 FM | Radyo Magbalantay | Silangan Broadcasting Corporation | Contemporary MOR, News, Talk | DXSN | 5 KW | Surigao |
| 99.3 FM | Infinite Radio Claver | St. Jude Thaddeus Institute of Technology | Contemporary MOR, News, Talk | DXUS | 5 KW | Claver |
| 105.5 FM | Brigada News FM Surigao | Brigada Mass Media Corporation (Baycomms Broadcasting Corporation) | Contemporary MOR, OPM, News, Talk | DXEH | 5 kW | Surigao City |
| 107.3 FM | All Star FM | Subic Broadcasting Corporation | Contemporary MOR, OPM | DXMS | 5 kW | Surigao City |

== Surigao del Sur ==
=== FM stations ===
| Frequency | Name | Company | Format | Call Sign | Power | Location Covered |
|---|---|---|---|---|---|---|
| 88.9 FM | Unity Radio Tagbina | ABSFM Radio Network (ABS Media Group) | Contemporary MOR, News, Talk | DXCD | 5 KW | Tagbina |
| 89.9 FM | Heart Radio | —N/a | Community Radio | —N/a | 5 KW | Madrid |
| 90.1 FM | Infinite Radio Tandag | St. Jude Thaddeus Institute of Technology | News, Talk, Music | DXOW | 5 KW | Tandag |
| 91.1 FM | Radyo Natin Bislig | MBC Media Group | Community Radio | DXSW | 5 KW | Bislig |
| 91.7 FM | D'One FM | Logronio Broadcasting Services | Contemporary MOR, News, Talk | DXRL | 5 KW | Marihatag |
| 92.1 FM | ABSFM Radio Marihatag | ABSFM Radio Network (ABS Media Group) | Contemporary MOR, News, Talk | | 5 KW | Marihatag |
| 93.1 FM | Hi FM | —N/a | Contemporary MOR, OPM | DXJP | 5 KW | Tandag |
| 93.9 FM | ABSFM Radio San Miguel | ABSFM Radio Network (ABS Media Group) | Contemporary MOR, News, Talk | DXKD | 5 KW | San Miguel |
| 96.9 FM | Radyo Probinsyano | Amapola Broadcasting System | Community radio | DXVJ | 5 KW | Carrascal |
| 97.1 FM | Enchanted FM | —N/a | Community Radio | —N/a | 5 KW | Hinatuan |
| 97.5 FM | Sure FM | VTP Broadcast Venture, Inc. (Iddes Broadcast Group) | Contemporary MOR, OPM | DXBP | 5 KW | Tandag |
| 98.1 FM | Barangay Radio | Soundstream Broadcasting Corporation | Contemporary MOR, Music, Talk | —N/a | 5 KW | Bislig |
| 98.3 FM | Radyo Pilipinas Tandag | Presidential Broadcast Service | news, public affairs, talk | DXJS | 5 KW | Tandag |
| 98.5 FM | Infinite Radio Bislig | St. Jude Thaddeus Institute of Technology | News, Talk, Music | DXEE | 5 KW | Bislig |
| 99.3 FM | Unity Radio Cortes | ABSFM Radio Network (ABS Media Group) | Contemporary MOR, News, Talk | DXDU | 5 KW | Cortes |
| 100.3 FM | Unity Radio Lianga | ABSFM Radio Network (ABS Media Group) | Contemporary MOR, News, Talk | DXAJ | 5 KW | Lianga |
| 100.7 FM | Kalipay Radio | —N/a | Community radio | —N/a | 5 KW | Cantilan |
| 101.5 FM | Juander Radyo Tandag | Malindang Broadcasting Network Corporation (operated by RSV Broadcasting Network Incorporated) | News, Talk, Music | —N/a | 5 KW | Tandag |
| 101.9 FM | ABSFM Radio Tandag | ABSFM Radio Network (ABS Media Group) | Contemporary MOR, News, Talk | | 5 KW | Tandag |
| 102.3 FM | Prime FM Tandag | Prime Broadcasting Network | News, Talk, Music | —N/a | 5 KW | Tandag |
| 102.5 FM | Kings Radio Hinatuan | KAMM Media Network | News, Talk, Music | —N/a | 5 KW | Hinatuan |
| 103.5 FM | GETS FM Madrid | —N/a | Community Radio | —N/a | 1 KW | Madrid |
| 104.1 FM | Freedom Radio | —N/a | News, Talk, Music | DXFR | 5 KW | Cantilan |
| 105.1 FM | Radyo Serbato Tandag | Click General Merchandise | News, Talk, Music | | 5 KW | Tandag |

== Dinagat Islands ==
=== FM stations ===
| Frequency | Name | Company | Format | Call Sign | Power | Location Covered |
|---|---|---|---|---|---|---|
| 91.5 FM | Island FM | Hypersonic Broadcasting Center (operated by JCY Holdings Corporation) | Contemporary MOR, News, Talk | —N/a | 5 KW | San Jose, Dinagat Islands |
| 99.9 FM | Gospel Radio | Golden Nation Network (affiliated by Rubenian International) | Gospel, Talk | DXAC | 5 kW | San Jose, Dinagat Islands |
