= List of radio stations in Butuan =

Below is a list of radio stations in Butuan, Philippines, whose coverage is in part or whole of the same.

== AM Stations ==
| Frequency | Name | Company | Format | Call Sign | Power | Covered Location |
|---|---|---|---|---|---|---|
| 693 AM | DXBC 693 RMN Butuan | Radio Mindanao Network | News, Public Affairs, Talk, Drama | DXBC | 5 KW | Butuan & Agusan del Norte |
| 792 AM | Radyo Pilipinas Butuan | Philippine Broadcasting Service | News, Public Affairs, Talk, Government Radio | DXBN | 5 KW | Butuan & Agusan del Norte |
| 981 AM | Bombo Radyo Butuan | People's Broadcasting Service, Inc. / Bombo Radyo Philippines | News, Public Affairs, Talk, Drama | DXBR | 10 KW | Butuan, Agusan del Norte, some parts of Agusan del Sur and Misamis Oriental |

== FM Stations ==
| Frequency | Name | Company | Format | Call Sign | Power | Covered Location |
|---|---|---|---|---|---|---|
| 88.7 FM | Real Radio Butuan | PEC Broadcasting Corporation | Contemporary MOR, OPM | DXGL | 5 KW | Butuan |
| 90.1 FM | Gold FM Butuan | Kaissar Broadcasting Network | Oldies | DXKA | 5 KW | Butuan |
| 91.3 FM | Power Radio | — | Oldies, News, Talk | — | 5 KW | Butuan |
| 92.1 FM | Radyo Trese | — | Contemporary MOR, News, Talk | DXYJ-FM | 5 KW | Butuan |
| 93.5 FM | Hope Radio Butuan | Digital Broadcasting Corporation (Adventist Media) | Religious (Seventh-day Adventist Church) | DXIM | 5 KW | Butuan |
| 95.1 FM | Love Radio Butuan | Cebu Broadcasting Company (an affiliate of Manila Broadcasting Company) | Contemporary MOR, OPM | DXMB-FM | 10 KW | Butuan |
| 95.9 FM | One FM Butuan | Radio Corporation of the Philippines (a subsidiary of Radyo Pilipino Media Group) | Contemporary MOR, OPM | DXPQ-FM | 3 KW | Butuan |
| 96.7 FM | Brigada News FM Butuan | Baycomms Broadcasting Corporation (a subsidiary of Brigada Mass Media Corporation) | Contemporary MOR, News, Talk | DXVA-FM | 5 KW | Butuan |
| 97.5 FM | Magik FM Butuan | Century Broadcasting Network | Contemporary MOR, OPM | DXMK | 5 KW | Butuan |
| 98.5 FM | Wild FM Butuan | UM Broadcasting Network | Contemporary MOR, OPM | DXBB-FM | 5 kW | Butuan |
| 100.7 FM | iFM Butuan | Radio Mindanao Network | Contemporary MOR, News, Talk | DXXX-FM | 5 kW | Butuan |
| 101.5 FM | FM Radio Butuan | Philippine Collective Media Corporation | Contemporary MOR, OPM, News | — | 2 kW | Butuan |
| 101.9 FM | Radyo Sincero Butuan | Audiovisual Communicators | Contemporary MOR, News, Talk | — | 5 KW | Butuan |
| 103.1 FM | Radyo Serbato Butuan | Hypersonic Broadcasting Center | | DXAM | 5 kW | Butuan |
