= DXBN =

DXBN is the callsign of the following radio stations located in Butuan:

- DXBN-AM, an AM station of Presidential Broadcast Service
- DXBN-TV, a TV station of People's Television Network
