= DXNS =

DXNS is the callsign of two broadcast stations owned by Northern Mindanao Broadcasting System in Butuan City, Philippines:

- DXNS-FM, radio station
- DXNS-TV, television station
