= DWVN =

DWVN may refer to:

- DWVN-FM, an FM radio station broadcasting in Vigan, branded as Magik FM
- DWVN-DTV, a Digital TV radio station broadcasting in Metro Manila
