= DXRR =

DXRR is the callsign used by the following radio stations in Mindanao, Philippines:

- DXRR (Nasipit), an FM station of Manila Broadcasting Company, located in Nasipit, Agusan del Norte, branded as 94.3 Radyo Serbisyo
- DXRR (Davao City), a defunct FM station of ABS-CBN Corporation, located in Davao City, branded as MOR 101.1 (now Anchor Radio)
- DXRR-AM, an AM station of Kalayaan Broadcasting System, Inc., located in Davao City, branded as Radyo Rapido 1017 AM
