= DWAB-TV =

- Olongapo City; Philippines
- Branding: Channel 22 Olongapo

Programming
- Affiliations: TV5 Network Inc.

Ownership
- Owner: Subic Broadcasting Corporation

History
- Founded: January 2011
- Last air date: August 2023
- Former channel number: Analog: 22 (UHF) (2011-2023)
- Former affiliations: TV5 Network Inc. (2013-2023)

Technical information
- Licensing authority: NTC
- Power: 5,000 watts

DWAB-TV, channel 22, was a television headquarters ownership of Subic Broadcasting Corporation. Its studio and transmitter were located at Admiral Royale Building, 17 Street cor. Anonas Street, Brgy. West Bajac-Bajac, Olongapo. It is approved by the government under Republic Act No. 7511 of the Philippine Constitution to serve Olongapoand Subic Bay Freeport Zone.

The station was an affiliate station of the TV5 Network Inc. from 2013 until 2023, serving the people of Olongapo City and the Subic Bay Freeport Zone. It went off the air in August 2023.

== Membership ==
- Central Luzon Media Association
- Kapisanan ng Mga Broadkaster ng Pilipinas

== See also ==
- 97.5 dwOK FM
- GO AM 1008
