= DXMS =

DXMS may refer to:

- DXMS-AM, an AM radio station broadcasting in Cotabato City, branded as Radyo Bida
- DXMS-FM, an FM radio station broadcasting in Surigao City, branded as All Star Radio
