= DXDB =

DXDB may refer to:

- DXDB-AM, an AM radio station broadcasting in Malaybalay, branded as Radyo Bandilyo.
- DXDB-FM, an FM radio station broadcasting in Iligan, branded as Hope Radio.
