= DWGO =

DWGO may refer to:

- DWGO-AM, an AM radio station in Olongapo
- DWGO-FM, an FM radio station in Legazpi, Albay, branded as One FM
