= DXIC =

DXIC may refer to:

- DXIC-AM, an AM radio station broadcasting in Iligan
- DXIC-FM, an FM radio station broadcasting in General Santos, branded as Hope Radio
