= DXJA =

Power Radio
Midsayap; Philippines
- Broadcast area: Cotabato
- Frequency: 94.3 MHz
- Branding: 94.3 Power Radio

Programming
- Languages: Filipino, Cebuano
- Format: Contemporary MOR, News, Talk

Ownership
- Owner: Hypersonic Broadcasting Center
- Operator: JR Media Resource and Development

History
- First air date: June 1, 2015

Technical information
- Licensing authority: NTC
- Power: 5 kW

94.3 Power Radio (DXJA 94.3 MHz) is an FM station owned by Hypersonic Broadcasting Center and operated by JR Media Resource and Development. Its studios and transmitter are located at Purok Rosas, Brgy. Poblacion 8, Midsayap.
