= DXCR =

Radio station in Bukidnon, Philippines

Hope Radio Bukidnon (DXCR)
Valencia; Philippines
- Broadcast area: Bukidnon and surrounding areas
- Frequencies: 1386 kHz; 96.9 MHz
- Branding: Hope Radio 1386

Programming
- Languages: English, Cebuano, Filipino
- Format: Religious Radio (Seventh-day Adventist Church)
- Network: Hope Radio

Ownership
- Owner: Adventist Media; (MVC Media Center)

History
- First air date: October 6, 1973
- Former frequencies: 1330 kHz (1973–1978)

Technical information
- Licensing authority: NTC
- Power: 10,000 watts

DXCR (1386 AM and 96.9 FM) Hope Radio is a radio station owned and operated by Adventist Media. Its studios and transmitter are located at College Heights, Lilingayon Rd., Brgy. Mount Nebo, Valencia, Bukidnon.

== History ==
=== Background ===
Mountain View College (MVC) in Valencia, Bukidnon had its broadcast franchise granted through Republic Act No. 5724, sponsored by senator Rodolfo Ganzon and became a law on June 21, 1969.

MVC students and clubs, and American Adventist missionaries, as well as members of other churches, helped in the financing and installation of the college's radio station, especially Pastor Cris Lauda of Washington, D.C. who gave donation for its construction.

=== 1973-2006: DXCR ===
By mid-1973, the station began its test broadcast as DXCR-AM through its 190-ft, 5-kW transmitter, and with custom-built equipment. It was eventually launched on October 6. An Adventist Radio Network member, the programming had been focusing mainly on evangelism, as well as educational ones. Daily broadcasts were later extended by two hours, thus operating until 10 p.m.

In late 1978, in response to the adoption of the 9-kHz spacing on AM radio stations in the Philippines under the Geneva Frequency Plan of 1975, the station's frequency was transferred to present-day 1386 kHz from originally approved 1330 kHz.

At that time, there was a critical need for stable electricity as the transmitter was unable to operate efficiently especially during dry season. Through the help of Donald Christensen as business manager, and donation from Quiet Hour Ministries, it was on January 1, 1983 when the Hydroelectric Power Plant-2, whose source is the Manupali River, was commissioned, as DXCR inaugurated a new, 10-kW transmitter, and commenced broadcasting twenty hours daily.

The same problem occurred in 1998 through severe drought, causing a part of normal electrical power to be generated. This prompted the station to reduce its broadcast hours.

The station was closed in 2005, citing financial and technical problems.

=== 2011-present: Hope Radio ===
On its anniversary in 2011, MVC revived the station, which became the nucleus of Hope Radio. The following year, Hope Radio expanded to various areas with the inauguration of DXHR-AM in Butuan.

Prior to its 40th anniversary, the station, while operating 17 hours daily with development-oriented programs, tried 24/7 online streaming. At that time, majority of the staff are students. The station, transmitting with 10-kW power through its 180-ft tower; holds the distinction being the most powerful in Bukidnon by mid-1980s and mid-2010s.
