= DXMH =

Hope Radio Mati (DXMH)
- Mati; Philippines
- Broadcast area: Davao Oriental, parts of Davao de Oro
- Frequency: 94.3 MHz
- Branding: 94.3 Hope Radio

Programming
- Languages: English, Cebuano, Filipino
- Format: Religious Radio (Seventh-day Adventist Church)
- Network: Hope Radio

Ownership
- Owner: Adventist Media; (Digital Broadcasting Corporation)

History
- First air date: June 28, 2012
- Call sign meaning: Mati's Hope Radio

Technical information
- Licensing authority: NTC
- Power: 1 kW

94.3 Hope Radio (DXMH 94.3 MHz) is an FM station owned and operated by Adventist Media. Its studios and transmitter are located at Globesite SDA Compound, Stampa Beach, Brgy. Dahican, Mati, Davao Oriental. The frequency is formerly owned by Century Broadcasting Network.
