= DXQB =

Radio Kilat (DXQB)
- Quezon; Philippines
- Broadcast area: Southern Bukidnon and surrounding areas
- Frequency: 107.7 MHz
- Branding: Radio Kilat 107.7

Programming
- Languages: Cebuano, Filipino
- Format: Contemporary MOR, News, Talk

Ownership
- Owner: Subic Broadcasting Corporation
- Operator: Kilat Radiokast

History
- First air date: 2015
- Former frequencies: 100.9 MHz (2015–2016)
- Call sign meaning: Quezon, Bukidnon

Technical information
- Licensing authority: NTC
- Power: 1 kW

Links
- Website: radiokilat.blogspot.com

Radio Kilat 107.7 (DXQB 107.7 MHz) is an FM station owned by Subic Broadcasting Corporation and operated by Kilat RadioKast. Its studio is located at Brgy. Poblacion, Quezon, Bukidnon, and its transmitter is located at Brgy. Butong, Quezon, Bukidnon.
