= DWZR =

Radio station in Legazpi, Philippines

Zoom Radio (DWZR)
- Legazpi; Philippines
- Broadcast area: Albay and surrounding areas
- Frequency: 828 kHz
- Branding: DWZR 828 Zoom Radio

Programming
- Languages: Albayanon, Filipino
- Format: News, Public Affairs, Talk

Ownership
- Owner: Hypersonic Broadcasting Center

History
- First air date: June 21, 1969
- Former frequencies: 820 kHz
- Call sign meaning: Zoom Radio

Technical information
- Licensing authority: NTC
- Power: 5,000 watts

DWZR (828 AM) Zoom Radio is a radio station owned and operated by Hypersonic Broadcasting Center. The station's studio is located at HBC Bldg., Penaranda St., Brgy. Iraya, Legazpi, Albay.

== History ==
DWZR was established by Dr. Hernandez Baldo of Manito, years prior to the 1972 declaration of the nationwide martial law. Thereafter, the station was among the three in the city which were able to operate.
