= DYHG =

Radio station in Roxas City, Philippines

K5 News FM Roxas (DYHG)
Roxas City; Philippines
- Broadcast area: Capiz, Parts of Aklan
- Frequency: 100.9 MHz
- Branding: 100.9 K5 News FM

Programming
- Languages: Capiznon, Filipino
- Format: Contemporary MOR, News, Talk
- Network: K5 News FM
- Affiliations: Abante; Bilyonaryo News Channel

Ownership
- Owner: Hypersonic Broadcasting Center
- Operator: 5K Broadcasting Network

History
- First air date: February 8, 2020
- Former names: Radyo Bandera
- Call sign meaning: Hypersonic Broadcasting Center

Technical information
- Licensing authority: NTC
- Power: 5 kW

100.9 K5 News FM (DYHG 100.9 MHz) is an FM station owned by Hypersonic Broadcasting Center and operated by 5K Broadcasting Network. Its studios and transmitter are located at 3rd Floor, FCD Bldg., McKinley St., Roxas City.
