= DWAV =

Radio station in Metro Manila, Philippines

AWR Manila (DWAV)
- Pasay; Philippines
- Broadcast area: Mega Manila and surrounding areas
- Frequency: 89.1 MHz
- RDS: AWR 89.1
- Branding: Adventist World Radio 89.1

Programming
- Languages: English, Filipino
- Format: Religious Radio (Seventh-day Adventist Church)
- Network: Adventist World Radio

Ownership
- Owner: Blockbuster Broadcasting System
- Operator: Adventist Media
- Sister stations: Through Adventist Media: DWVN-DTV (Hope Channel Philippines)

History
- First air date: 1975
- Former call signs: DWKB (1975–1989); DZMZ (1989–2001)
- Former names: KB 89.1 (1975–1989); 89 DMZ (1989–2001); Wave 89.1 (2001–2024)
- Call sign meaning: Wave (former branding)

Technical information
- Licensing authority: NTC
- Class: A (clear frequency)
- Power: 20,000 watts
- ERP: 60,000 watts

Links
- Webcast: Listen live Official livestream
- Website: home.awrmanila.ph

DWAV (89.1 FM), broadcasting as Adventist World Radio 89.1, is a radio station owned by Blockbuster Broadcasting System and operated under an airtime lease agreement by the Adventist Media. The station's studio is located at the North Philippines Union Conference Compound, #210 San Juan St., Pasay, while its transmitter is located at Palos Verdes Executive Village, Brgy. Sta. Cruz, Sumulong Highway, Antipolo.

== History ==
=== 1975–1989: KB ===
The station first aired on September 1,1975 as KB 89.1 under the call letters DWKB-FM. It was under the ownership of the Intercontinental Broadcasting Corporation. In a short time, it became one of the country's most listened easy listening FM stations.

In 1987, the management planned to reformat the station, which would play Pinoy music, for the announcers to be competitive; the latter preferred to carry on its old format.

=== 1989–2001: 89 DMZ ===
The station later rebranded as 89 DMZ and also changed its callsign to DZMZ-FM. It was known for airing dance, techno-pop, hip-hop and remixed music throughout its existence. The late rapper, Francis Magalona, worked with the station beginning in 1994 through his program, "The Word-up Show", which aired on Saturday nights. It also became the home of the "Mobile Circuit" aired on Friday nights.

From May 23, 2000, in what was the first in the country's broadcasting, the station simulcast a Tuesday primetime variety show of IBC-13, DMZTV, whose format is similar to that of MTV.

==== Government bidding and change of ownership ====
The station was among those assets of the Intercontinental Broadcasting Corporation which had been sequestered by the Aquino administration through the newly-formed Presidential Commission on Good Government (PCGG); with the network's privatization being planned since mid-1990s. The station was eventually acquired by the Vera Group though Blockbuster Broadcasting System, Inc. in a bidding held by the Presidential Commission on Good Government in December 2000. However, the station shared its transmission facilities with IBC-13 until 2014 when it transferred its facilities to Antipolo.

=== 2001–2024: Wave ===
Wave 89.1 began regular broadcast on March 1, 2001, simultaneous with a media launch in a hotel in Makati. It also changed its callsign to DWAV to reflect the branding. Managed by former Magic 89.9 jock Rolando Sulit a.k.a. Joe D'Mango, the station initially carried an urban adult contemporary format, playing contemporary pop music and rhythm and blues.

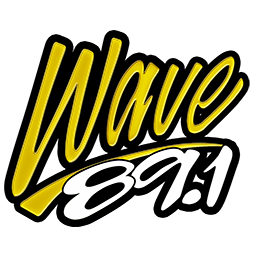
Logo from 2009 to 2014

In 2007, Gary Caoili took over the management of the station after Sulit departed his management duties for both Wave and sister station Jam 88.3 (and subsequently transferred to ABS-CBN before migrating to Australia for good). A year later, after the demise of Blazin' 105.9, the station shifted to Urban Contemporary, playing more Hip Hop and R&B.

From 2010 to 2014, the station has been known for hosting the Urban Music Awards.

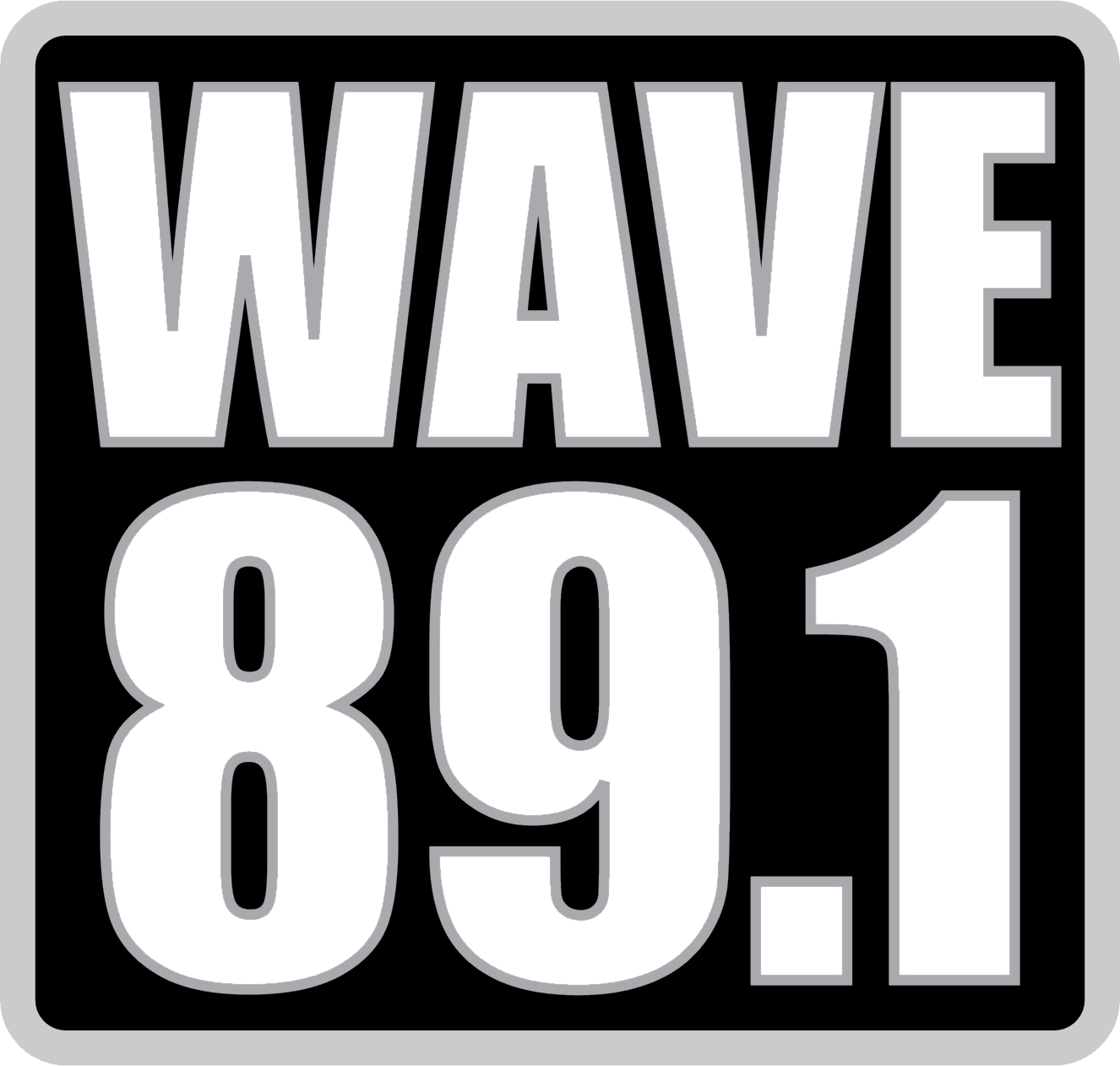
Logo from 2015 to 2020

From 2015 to mid-2022, Nelson Capulso (known on-air as "Sgt. Pepper" or "The Sarge") was the station manager.

On April 14, 2024, Wave quietly signed off for the last time.

=== 2024–present: AWR 89.1 ===
On March 10, 2024, the Adventist Media, the local radio arm of the Seventh-day Adventist Church that runs Adventist World Radio (AWR) and Hope Radio, signed an agreement with Blockbuster Broadcasting System, wherein it will lease the station.

On April 15, the station returned on air as a test broadcast. It was officially launched on April 24, 2024 under the Adventist World Radio network, though it still occasionally referred its promotions as AWR on Wave 89.1. On October 31, 2024, the Wave brand was officially dropped.

== Compilation CDs ==
=== As Wave 89.1 ===
- Dream Sounds (MCA Universal, 2002)
- Dream Sounds 2 (MCA Universal, 2003)
- Dream Sounds 3 (EMI Philippines, 2005)
- Feel Good Fridays (EMI Philippines, 2006)
- MYMP: New Horizon (Ivory Music, 2006) (in collaboration with Magic 89.9, Jam 88.3, 90.7 Love Radio & Yes! FM 101.1)
- Freestyle: Back at the Yard (Viva Records, 2007) (in collaboration with Magic 89.9)
- Soul Obsessions: Duets with Thor (Ivory Music, 2007)
- Nyoy Volante: Heartstrings (Vicor Music, 2008)
- MYMP: Now (Ivory Music, 2008) (in collaboration with Jam 88.3, 90.7 Love Radio & Yes! FM 101.1)
- Six O Slow/The Quiet Storm Album (MCA Music, 2009)
- Nina: Renditions of the Soul (Warner Music Philippines, 2009)
- Freestyle: Playlist (Viva Records, 2009) (in collaboration with Magic 89.9, Jam 88.3 & 99.5 RT)
- Princess Velasco: Addicted to Acoustic (Viva Records, 2009) (in collaboration with Jam 88.3 & Mellow 947)
