= DWEN =

Philippine radio station

Boom Radio (DWEN)
- Daet; Philippines
- Broadcast area: Camarines Norte
- Frequency: 100.5 MHz
- Branding: 100.5 Boom Radio

Programming
- Languages: Bicolano, Filipino
- Format: Pop MOR, News, Talk

Ownership
- Owner: Hypersonic Broadcasting Center
- Operator: Hambalos Multimedia Services

History
- First air date: 2015
- Former names: Cool Radio (2015-July 2022)

Technical information
- Licensing authority: NTC
- Power: 5,000 watts

DWEN (100.5 FM), broadcasting as 100.5 Boom Radio, is a radio station owned by Hypersonic Broadcasting Center and operated by Hambalos Multimedia Services. Its studios and transmitter are located at Purok 4, LTO Compound, Brgy. Alawihao, Daet.

== History ==
The station was established in 2015 as Cool Radio under the management of Coolwave Broadcast, headed by Rodel Llovit. It was formerly located in Reagan Building, adjacent to the Daet Public Market. On July 12, 2022, after Llovit's passing, the station was relaunched as Boom Radio under the management of Hambalos Multimedia Services, headed by Micheal Dolera. It relocated to its present home in LTO Compound.
