= Radyo Siram =

- Daraga; Philippines
- Broadcast area: Albay and surrounding areas
- Frequency: 101.1 MHz
- Branding: Radyo Siram 101.1

Programming
- Languages: Albayanon, Filipino
- Format: Contemporary MOR, News, Talk

Ownership
- Owner: Subic Broadcasting Corporation

History
- First air date: October 30, 2015
- Former call signs: DWHI (October 1, 2024-October 15, 2025)
- Former frequencies: 100.3 MHz (October 1, 2024-October 15, 2025)

Technical information
- Licensing authority: NTC
- Power: 5 kW

Radyo Siram 101.1 (101.1 FM) is a radio station owned and operated by Subic Broadcasting Corporation. Its studio and transmitter are located along Rizal St., Brgy. Sagpon, Daraga.

It was formerly on 100.3 MHz of Hypersonic Broadcasting Center from its inception on October 1, 2024 to October 15, 2025, when transferred to its current frequency.
