= Radyo Serbisyo Nasipit =

Radyo Serbisyo

Nasipit; Philippines
- Broadcast area: Western Agusan del Norte
- Frequency: 94.3 MHz
- Branding: Radyo Serbisyo 94.3

Programming
- Languages: Cebuano, Filipino
- Format: Contemporary MOR, News, Talk

Ownership
- Owner: Timogan Family

History
- First air date: December 9, 2001
- Former frequencies: 93.5 MHz (2001–2013)

Technical information
- Power: 1,000 watts

Radyo Serbisyo 94.3 (94.3 FM) is a radio station owned and operated by Ronald Timogan. The station's studio is located at the 2nd Floor, VHAO Bldg., along Jose Rizal St., Nasipit, and its transmitter is located at Brgy. 3, Nasipit.

== Brief history ==
The first and only radio station in Nasipit was established on December 9, 2001. It was formerly owned Manila Broadcasting Company under the now-defunct Hot FM network. It was managed by Ronald Timogan, a Municipal Councilor that time. Among its notable programs were Awitan ko Ikaw Nasipitnon every weekend night, Kalanrakas sa Kusina every noon, DXRR News Patrol (formerly Ronda Nasipit) every Morning & Afternoon, and Barangay 93.5 every Sunday with Lolo Carpo.

In 2013, Timogan fully bought the station. At that time, it moved to 93.7 MHz after Hope Radio of Butuan bought the frequency. In January 2015, it moved to 94.3 MHz to avoid interference with Hope Radio.
