= DWHQ =

AR FM (DWHQ)
- Baco; Philippines
- Broadcast area: Northern Mindoro
- Frequency: 98.1 MHz
- Branding: 98.1 AR FM

Programming
- Language: Filipino
- Format: Contemporary MOR, OPM

Ownership
- Owner: Hypersonic Broadcasting Center
- Operator: Mahalta Broadcasting Network and Media Services

History
- First air date: 2019
- Former frequencies: 89.7 MHz (2019)

Technical information
- Licensing authority: NTC
- Power: 5 kW

98.1 AR FM (DWHQ 98.1 MHz) is an FM station owned by Hypersonic Broadcasting Center and operated by Mahalta Broadcasting Network and Media Services. Its studios and transmitter are located at 4th Floor, Delrol Building, National Highway, Brgy. Katwiran II, Baco, Oriental Mindoro.
