= DXBH =

Radio station in Misamis Occidental, Philippines

Hope Radio Western Mindanao (DXBH)
- Tangub; Philippines
- Broadcast area: Misamis Occidental
- Frequency: 103.7 MHz
- Branding: 103.7 Hope Radio

Programming
- Languages: English, Filipino, Cebuano
- Format: Religious Radio
- Network: Hope Radio

Ownership
- Owner: Hope Channel Philippines; (Digital Broadcasting Corporation)

History
- First air date: March 2016
- Call sign meaning: Blessed Hope

Technical information
- Licensing authority: NTC
- Power: 1 kW

Links
- Website: dxbh.net

103.7 Hope Radio (DXBH 103.7 MHz) is an FM station owned and operated by Adventist Media. Its studios and transmitter are located in Tangub.
