= DXBN-TV =

DXBN-TV (PTV-9 Butuan)

Butuan; Philippines
- Channels: Analog: 9 (VHF); Digital: TBA (UHF)
- Branding: PTV-9 Butuan

Programming
- Affiliations: PTV

Ownership
- Owner: People's Television Network, Inc.; (Butuan City Fil-Products)

History
- Founded: April 27, 1960
- Former call signs: DXAJ-TV (1974-1986); DXNS-TV (1986-1995)
- Former channel numbers: 11 (1974-1986); 7 (1986-1995)
- Former affiliations: CBN (1960-1967); ABS-CBN (1967-1972); BBC/City2 (1973-1986); GMA Network (1986-1995)
- Call sign meaning: DX; ButuaN City

Technical information
- ERP: 5 kilowatts

Links
- Website: www.ptv.ph

DXBN-TV (channel 9), was a television station of Butuan City Fil-Products and affiliate of People's Television Network. Its studio, transmitter and broadcast facility are located at Libertad, Butuan. Currently the station is inactive.

== History ==
- April 27, 1960 - DXBN-TV channel 9 was originally used by ABS-CBN, the first television station in Caraga, was launched by CBN (later merging into ABS-CBN from ABS).
- 1973 - During the declaration of Martial Law by then-President Ferdinand Marcos, and takeover of ABS-CBN by his crony, Roberto Benedicto, DXBN-TV was reopened and became part of the Banahaw Broadcasting Corporation.
- 1986 - DXBN-TV channel 9 was launched by GMA Network as an affiliate station of the Butuan City Fil-Products.
- 1995 - DXBN-TV channel 9 became an affiliate station of the People's Television Network, Inc. (PTNI) under Butuan City Fil-Products. The same year, GMA Butuan was also launched on Channel 7 under its affiliate, Northern Mindanao Broadcasting System (later it moved its regional station to UHF Channel 26 in 2015) and ABS-CBN Butuan started its broadcasting on Channel 11 in 1999 until it became a semi-satellite station of Channel 4 Cagayan de Oro (formerly TV-2), effective from July 2018 to August 2020.
- July 16, 2001 - Under the new management appointed by the former President Gloria Macapagal Arroyo, PTNI adopted the name National Broadcasting Network (NBN) carrying new slogan "One People. One Nation. One Vision." for a new image in line with its new programming thrusts, they continued the new name until the Aquino administration in 2010.
- 2011 - After it was lasted for sixteen years in Butuan, the station is currently off the air.
