= DXYJ =

Radio station in Butuan, Philippines

Radyo 13 (DXYJ)
- Butuan; Philippines
- Broadcast area: Agusan del Norte and surrounding areas
- Frequency: 92.1 MHz
- Branding: 92.1 Radyo 13 (Trese)

Programming
- Languages: Cebuano, Filipino
- Format: Contemporary MOR, News, Talk

History
- First air date: 2011 (as Power FM); January 25, 2021 (as Radyo13)
- Former frequencies: 107.8 MHz (2011–2017)

Technical information
- Power: 5,000 watts

DXYJ (92.1 FM), broadcasting as 92.1 Radyo 13, is a radio station. The station's studio and transmitter are located along Jail Rd., Purok 3-A, Brgy. Libertad, Butuan.

The station was formerly known as 107.8 Power FM under the Philippine Information Agency Butuan Chapter from 2011 to 2017.
