= DXGL =

Radio station in Butuan, Philippines

Real Radio Butuan (DXGL)
- Butuan; Philippines
- Broadcast area: Agusan del Norte and surrounding areas
- Frequency: 88.7 MHz
- Branding: 88.7 Real Radio

Programming
- Languages: Cebuano, Filipino
- Format: Silent
- Network: Real Radio

Ownership
- Owner: PEC Broadcasting Corporation

History
- First air date: March 16, 1988; 38 years ago
- Last air date: 2023; 3 years ago

Technical information
- Licensing authority: NTC
- Power: 5,000 watts

DXGL (88.7 FM), broadcasting as 88.7 Real Radio, was a radio station owned and operated by PEC Broadcasting Corporation. It serves as the flagship station of Real Radio network. The station's studio is located at PECBC Broadcast Center, Capitol-Bonbon Rd., Imadejas Subdivision, Butuan.

After 35 years, the station went off the air in 2023 due to expire franchise by City Government of Butuan.
