= Hypersonic Broadcasting Center =

- Type: Private
- Industry: Broadcast
- Founded: June 21, 1969
- Founder: Hermie Baldo
- Headquarters: Legazpi, Albay, Philippines
- Key people: Exequiel Baldo President & Managing Director

Hypersonic Broadcasting Center is a Philippine radio network. Its corporate office is located at HBC Bldg., Penaranda St., Brgy. Iraya, Legazpi, Albay.

== HBC stations ==
=== AM stations ===
Branding	Callsign	Frequency	Location
Zoom Radio	DWZR	828 kHz	Legazpi

=== FM stations ===
Branding	Callsign	Frequency	Location	Operator
AR FM	DWHQ	98.1 MHz	Baco	Mahalta Broadcasting Network and Media Services
Boom Radio	DWEN	100.5 MHz	Daet	Hambalos Multimedia Services
K5 News FM Roxas	DYHG	100.9 MHz	Roxas	5K Broadcasting Network
Click Radio	DXAM	103.1 MHz	Butuan	Click General Merchandise
Max FM Tacurong	—N/a	91.1 MHz	Tacurong	Christian Media Management
Power Radio	DXJA	94.3 MHz	Midsayap	JR Media Resource and Development

=== Former stations ===
Callsign	Frequency	Location	Status
DWXX	1026 kHz	Metro Manila	Acquired by Nation Broadcasting Corporation and later by Swara Sug Media Corporation. Currently off the air.
DWFA	801 kHz	Sorsogon City	Off the air.
DWLH	101.5 MHz	Sorsogon City	Acquired by Baycomms Broadcasting Corporation.
DYHR	1089 kHz	Calbayog	Off the air.
DXEP	91.1 MHz	General Santos	Acquired by JMP Mass Media Production.
DWHI	100.3 MHz	Legazpi	Operations transferred to Subic Broadcasting Corporation's 101.1 FM.
DXRU	1188 kHz	Cagayan de Oro	Operations transferred to 103.9 FM.
DXMR	99.9 MHz	Cagayan de Oro	Acquired by Reliance Broadcasting Unlimited.
