= DWVN-DTV =

- Metro Manila; Philippines
- City: Pasay
- Channels: Digital: 45 (UHF) (ISDB-T); Virtual: 45.01

Programming
- Subchannels: See list
- Affiliations: 45.01: Hope Channel Philippines; 45.02: Hope International; 45.03: Hope Live; 45.04: GNN/RNG Luzon

Ownership
- Owner: Gateway UHF Television Broadcasting
- Operator: Global Satellite Technology Services
- Sister stations: Through Adventist Media: Adventist World Radio 89.1

History
- Founded: May 18, 2001
- Former call signs: DWVN-TV (2001–2018)
- Former channel numbers: Analog: 45 (UHF) (2001–2018); Digital: 44 (UHF) (2014–2020), 46 (UHF) (2020)

Technical information
- Licensing authority: NTC
- Power: 3,500 watts
- ERP: 5,000 watts

DWVN-DTV, is a digital television station of Gateway UHF Television Broadcasting. Its studios are located at North Philippines Union Conference Compound, #210 San Juan St., Pasay, while its transmitter is located at GSat Technical Facilities and Earth Station Building, First Global Technopark Complex, Lot 1910 Governor's Drive, Mabuhay, Carmona, Cavite.

As of December 1, 2018, the TV station's analog signal was permanently shutdown.

== History ==
UHF channel 45 began its operations on June 1, 2001, carrying 3ABN, the religious U.S.-based network of Seventh-day Adventist Church. In the later part of September 2011, it started carrying Hope Channel PHL, which is also associated by the said religion and broadcast every night while 3ABN broadcast every morning. On April 1, 2012, due to some transmitter and signal problems of the network, the station temporarily became silent. On May 15, 2012, it returned on-air with the same transmitting power.

It closed its operation again on September 9, 2012, together with DZRJ-TV 29 (which then transmitted from RJTV's tower before their transmitter shift in 2015). It was later found that the transmitter of UHF 45 was struck by lightning bolt. As a result, the station shut down temporarily for maintenance. It returned to airwaves on November 21, 2012 (DZRJ) and December 10, 2012 (DWVN) respectively.

Around 2011, Gateway began carrying Hope Channel PHL a U.S.-based Filipino language religious network which is also associated by the said religion. Initially aired as a blocktime program at select times, it later became available as a dedicated digital channel on terrestrial television in 2015.

From being a religious affiliate, Gateway leaned away from its privilege and converted into a basic blocktime broadcaster in mid-2017 by carrying Global News Network programs on its digital signal. Later, Gateway quietly ended its direct ties with 3ABN; instead, the main/analog service carries a separate Hope Channel PH's programming as well as other archived Adventist content. The analog service then limited programming at nighttime, although its signal remains active daily from morning to midnight.

By April 2018, Gateway re-introduced Hope Channel International from its digital television lineup; while its affiliation with 3ABN was re-secured by the network, albeit as a digital subchannel. But on November 1, 2018, 3ABN will be lasted on digital as its digital subchannel, and it aired the mirror feed of Hope Channel Philippines.

On December 1, 2018, the station shut down its analog signal.

On June 23, 2021, Gateway moved its transmitter site from Antipolo City to GSAT First Global Technopark complex in Carmona, Cavite with its 3,500 watts brand new digital transmitter.

== Digital television ==
=== Digital channels ===
UHF Channel 45 (659.143 MHz)

Channel	Video	Aspect	Short name	Programming	Note
45.01	1080i	16:9	Hope Phil	Hope Channel Philippines	Fully migrated from analog to digital/Test broadcast/Configuration testing
45.02	480i	16:9	Hope Intl	Hope Channel Philippines	Test broadcast
45.03	480i	16:9	Hope Live	Hope Channel Philippines	Test broadcast
45.04	480i	16:9	GNN SD	Golden Nation Network/RNG Luzon	Test broadcast

== Areas of coverage ==
=== Primary areas ===
- Southern Metro Manila (weak signal)
- Cavite
- Laguna

==== Secondary areas ====
- Portion of Rizal
- Portion of Batangas

== See also ==
- 3ABN
- Hope Channel Philippines
- Golden Nation Network
