= Saint Michael College of Caraga =

Roman Catholic college in Agusan del Norte, Philippines

- Former name: Saint Michael's Institute (1948‑2002)
- Motto: Lux Mundi, Sal Terrae
- Motto in English: Light of the World, Salt of the Earth
- Type: Private Catholic Diocesan basic and higher education institution
- Established: 1948; 78 years ago
- Religious affiliation: Roman Catholic (Diocese of Butuan)
- Academic affiliations: Diocese of Butuan Educational System; Agusan Catholic Education Association (ACEA); Catholic Educational Association of the Philippines; Fund Assistance for Private Education
- Chairman: Most Reverend Cosme Damian R. Almedilla, DD
- President: Rev. Fr. Ronniel G. Babano, STL
- Principal: Jenny B. Layong (Elementary); Rene A. Japitana (Junior High School); Wendell B. Gonzaga (Senior High School)
- Undergraduates: 3,000+
- Location: Atupan Street, Nasipit, Agusan del Norte, Philippines; 8°59′16″N 125°20′24″E
- Campus: Urban 0.163 hectares (1,630 m^{2}) Triangulo Campus Nasipit, Agusan del Norte, Philippines
- Hymn: "SMCC Alma Mater Song"
- Colors: Midnight Blue; Green; Yellow
- Nickname: Michaelinian
- Website: www.smccnasipit.edu.ph
- Location in Mindanao Location in the Philippines

Saint Michael College of Caraga (SMCC) is a private Roman Catholic educational institution offering basic and higher education in Nasipit, Agusan del Norte, Philippines. It is administered by the Roman Catholic Diocese of Butuan and was established in 1948 by the Missionaries of the Sacred Heart (MSC).

The institution operates two campuses. Its main campus is situated along Atupan Street, Barangay 4, Poblacion, Nasipit, Agusan del Norte. The second campus is located in Barangay Triangulo, which accommodates classes for the Elementary, Senior High School, and College levels.

== History ==
School Directors & Presidents of Saint Michael College of Caraga
Rev. Fr. Francisco van Dijk, MSC	1999–2000
Rev. Fr. Gerard Cruijsen, MSC	2000–2001
Rev. Fr. Geraldo Blewanus, MSC	2002-2003
Rev. Fr. Enrique van Ma-anen, MSC	2003-2004
Rev. Fr. Venancio Portillo, MSC	2005
Rev. Fr. Mateo van Santvoord, MSC	2006-2007
Rev. Fr. Anthony Krol, MSC	2007
Gregorio E. Orais	2007-2009
Antonio L. Suarez	2009-2011
Faro Gatchalian	2011-2012
Necita R. Lim	2012-2013
Rev. Fr. Achilles Ayaton	2013-2014
Msgr. Cesar L. Gatela	2014-2015
Msgr. Bienvinido A. Betaizar, PC	1999–2009
Rev. Fr. Ronniel G. Babano, STL	2020–present

In 1948, Nasipit was still a part of the Parish of Buenavista, Agusan del Norte, whose Parish Priest was the late Fr. Martin Westeinde, a Dutch MSC. As the town progressed, population also increased and business gained momentum with the start of the logging industry of the Nasipit Lumber Company (NALCO). Fr. Martin and his co-adjurer Fr. Atanacio de Castro saw the need of putting-up a secondary school. Fr. De Castro was made in charge of the school.

It started its operation on July 1, 1999, with Rev. Fr. Francisco Van Dyke as the first Director. He was succeeded by Rev. Fr. Enrique Van Ma-anen, Rev. Fr. Vicente Portillo, Rev. Fr. Mateo Van Santvoord, and Rev. Fr. Anthony Krol in the order of succession. Rev. Fr. Krol was the last Dutch priest who served as the school director.

The school site is beside the rectory with an area of 1,630 sq.m. Fr. Gerard Cruisjen, one of the subsequent Directors converted the nipa-wooden structure into a concrete two-storey building with 16 classrooms.

When the Filipinization Law was implemented in 2001 a layman (now deceased) Mr. Gregorio Orias, became the first layman School Director until he retired in 2002. He was followed by Mr. Antonio L. Suarez, the first layman Director/Principal of the school. Faro Gatchalian followed until 2003.then Mrs. Necita Lim took the helm of the Directorship until 2004 while acting also as the Principal of St. James High School of Buenavista, an adjacent town of Nasipit . In 2006, Fr. Achilles Ayaton became the School Director until 1993. In 2008, Msgr. Cesar L. Gatela took over the School's Directorship until 1999 when he succumbed to a cardiac arrest in Cebu City. In his term, he opened the Pre-School Department with Sister Minah B. Hijada as the Administrator and he bought 19 computers integrating the Computer Technology subject to all levels of the High School Department.

The Teatro, Sayaw, at Awit Production (TESAW Production) Center of the Michaelinian Performing Arts was established on June 01, 2008 with Dr. Dennis P. Mausisa as the Founder and Artistic Director.

In 2009, after the sudden death of Msgr. Gatela, Msgr. Juan de Dios Pueblos, the bishop of Butuan appointed Msgr. Bienvenido A. Betaizar as the School Director who was later on promoted as School President until at present.

June 2020, Msgr. Betaizar opened the Grade School department with Mrs. Minda R. Cocon as the first Principal offering Grades I-IV and the College Department with Technical Courses offering with Mr. Antonio L. Suarez as the College Administrator until his death in February 2022.

June 2023, Baccalaureate Programs were opened which include Bachelor of Elementary Education, Bachelor of Secondary Education major in English, Bachelor of Science in Business Administration major in Financial Management and Bachelor of Arts in English Language. The Planning and Development Center was established with Dr. Dennis P. Mausisa as the Head of Office.

February 16, 2023, the name Saint Michael's Institute was replaced with Saint Michael College of Caraga as suggested by Mrs. Vanica P. Del Rosario during the 1st SMI General Assembly. The name was duly approved by the Securities and Exchange Commission.

In 2023, Dr. Dennis P. Mausisa unveiled the SMCC's Vision 2020 with the flagship program "Magbayanihan Tayo". SMCC's Vision 2020 is a long range master plan of SMCC for seven key areas: Personnel, Instruction and Curriculum, Physical Plant and Facilities, Library, Student Services, Community Extension Service, and Research and Accreditation. This year also, within three years of operation the College Department was named as one of the Top Three Performing Schools in the Caraga for the Kabalikat Award 2002 of TESDA. Additional courses were opened like 2-Year Computer-Based Accounting Technology, 2 Year Tourism Technology and 2 Year Computer-Technician. Speech subject was introduced in all departments complete with the state of the art speech facilities.

2003, the Accounting Department was established.

June 10, 2005, a four-storey concrete building was inaugurated. The Elementary Department was transferred from the Montinola Building to the main campus where the new building is situated. The new building housed the different offices, Preschool, High School, Mini Hotel, AVR and Faculty Rooms. Bachelor of Science in Computer Science was opened. Mini School bus was acquired.

2006, SMCC Angel Festival was introduced by Dr. Mausisa to the Michaelinian community.

2007, SMCC launches the SMCC Website https://smccnasipit.edu.ph/

2008, College Department awarded by TESDA Region XIII as MODEL TVET Provider School in Agusan del Norte-Butuan City. The SMCC school logo was changed.

2009, Bureau of Immigration granted the school the accreditation permit to accept Foreign Students from Preschool to College. Commission on Higher Education granted the permit to operate Bachelor of Science in Hotel and Restaurant Management.

2010, Bachelor of Science in Information Technology and One Year Seafarer were opened.

2012, additional programs were opened the Bachelor of Science in Criminology, Bachelor of Science in Tourism Management, and the Housekeeping NCII. TESDA bundled programs were opened the Two year Hotel and Restaurant Technology with qualifications in Food and Beverage Services NC II and Housekeeping NCII, Two year Information Technology with qualifications in Computer Hardware Servicing NCII and Computer Programming NC IV and Two year Computer Electronics Technology with qualifications in Computer Hardware Servicing NC II and Consumer Electronics Servicing NC II.

2014, SMCC was granted by the Department of Labor and Employment (DOLE) the Certificate of Compliance on General Labor Standards, Occupational Safety and health Standards, and Child Labor-Free Establishment.

2015, Opening of additional TESDA Programs, the One Year Ship's Catering Services NC I (formerly Seafarer) and Visual Graphics NC III.

Permit to operate Senior High School was granted by the Department of Education offering Grades 11 and 12.

SMCC Higher Education Research Journal Book 1 was published and granted with ISBN and ISSN.

Miss Icee Galinato, Fourth (4th) placer in the Licensure Examination for Teachers Elementary Level September 2015 Board Examination.

2016, Opening of additional departments, the Learning Resource Department and Research and Publication Department. The Learning Resource Department includes the library, IM Center, and E-Library.

Construction of the 4-Storey SMCC Annex Building at the former Elementary Department Area.

2017, Opening of the SMCC DXSM FM. The only FM Station of the Diocese of Butuan.

2018, Opening of Bachelor of Physical Education, Bachelor of Technical-Vocational Teacher Education, Bachelor of Library and Information Science, Bachelor of Public Administration, Bachelor of Science in Entrepreneurship.

SMCC was certified with ISO 9001:2015. The first school in the Diocese of Butuan with ISO certification and the first school in the Caraga Region to be ISO certified 9001:2015 version.

Accepted as member of the Philippine Society for Quality.

Granted with the International Accreditation by the Asia Pacific for Events Managements of the United Kingdom last October 12, 2018. The first school in the Caraga Region and Northern Mindanao to be accredited.

Over-all Champion of the Kumbira Festival 2018, Mindanao-Wide HRM Competition at Cagayan de Oro City.

Awarded as Most Outstanding Technical Vocational Institution of TESDA Butuan City and Agusan del Norte for 2018.

Awarded as one of the Top Ten Finance Students of the Philippines for 2018.

Awarded as Outstanding Students of the Caraga Region for 2018.

June 2019, Opening of TESDA Diploma Programs on Diploma in Tourism Technology, Diploma in Hotel and Restaurant Management, and Diploma in Information and Communication Technology.

2019, Over-all Champion of the Kumbira Festival 2019, Mindanao-Wide HRM Competition in Cagayan de Oro City.

2019, Mr. Bryl Pascua Ariola landed Fifth (5th) Placer in the Criminologist Licensure Examination on the December 2019 Board Examination.

February 2019, SMCC launched the Roadmap 2035 presented to the Bishop of the Diocese of Butuan, Rev. Msgr. Cosme Damian R. Armedilla by the School President, Msgr. Bienvinido A. Betaizar, PC and the Head of Planning and Program Standards, Dr. Dennis P. Mausisa.

July 2020, Rev. Fr. Eulogio Junio was appointed as the Vice-President of Research, Student Affairs, and Community Extension (RESACE).

November 2020, Rev. Msgr. Cosme Damian R. Armedilla, the Bishop of the Diocese of Butuan appointed Rev. Fr. Ronniel G. Babano, STL as the School President.

August 2021, Rev. Fr. Eulogio Junio was appointed as the Vice-President for Administrative Affairs and Dr. Beverly D. Jaminal was appointed as the Vice-President for Academic Affairs and Research.

2021, SMCC was recertified with ISO 9001:2015 version.

2022, Miss Suzanne Navarro landed Sixth (6th) Placer in the Licensure Examination for Teachers-Elementary Level on the January 2022 Board Examination.

January 2022, The College of Computing and Information System (CCIS) establish an Internship Memorandum of Understanding (MOU) with NeoDocto Inc. for Online On-the-job (OJT) training of the Bachelor of Science in Information Technology (BSIT) and Bachelor of Science in Computer Science (BSCS) students.

January 2022, Turn-over Ceremony of the SMCC Kabayaning Michaelinian Gawad Kalinga Community Development Program at Purok Macasihi, Camagong, Nasipit, Agusan del Norte.

February 2022, Private Educational Assistance Committee (PEAC) Recertification of the Junior High School Department.

March 2022, SMCC was granted with a membership certificate for Council of Deans and Heads of Library and Information Science Schools (CODHLIS).

April 2022, The Ground Breaking Ceremony and the construction of the Four-Storey Building at the Triangulo Campus.

June 2022, SMCC was awarded with the Certificate of Accreditation by TESDA as an Accredited Assessment Center in Bread and Pastry Production NC II and Events Management NC III.

June 2022, SMCC was recognized as the Number 1 Criminology School in Caraga Region.

August 2022, Opening of Bachelor of Secondary Education major in Social Studies.

December 2022, SMCC undergone Philippine Association of Colleges and Universities Commission on Accreditation (PACUCOA) Level 1 to the selected programs of the College department namely: Bachelor of Science in Business Administration (BSBA), Bachelor of Elementary Education (BEED), and Bachelor of Secondary Education (BSED).

January 2023, Philippine Association of Colleges and Universities Commission on Accreditation (PACUCOA) attested Bachelor of Secondary Education major in English (BSED) as Level 1 formal accredited status to be endorsed for certification to the Federation of Accrediting Agencies of the Philippines (FAAP).

March 2023, SMCC is the over-all champion in the PRISAA Regional Games 2023.

May 2023, the Federation of Accrediting Agencies of the Philippines (FAAP) grants Level 1 Accredited Status to Bachelor of Secondary Education major in English (BSED).

June 2023, Philippine Association of Colleges and Universities Commission on Accreditation (PACUCOA) Bachelor of Science in Business Administration (BSBA) and Bachelor of Elementary Education (BEED) as Level 1 formal accredited status to be endorsed for certification to the Federation of Accrediting Agencies of the Philippines (FAAP).

August 2023, Opening of Bachelor of Secondary Education major in Mathematics.

At present, SMCC strives to continue the tradition of excellence.

== Departments ==
- Elementary Department
  - Preschool, Grades 1-6
- Junior High School Department
  - Grade 7, Grade 8, Grade 9, Grade 10
- Senior High School Department
  - Grade 11 and 12
  - Academic Track: Humanities and Social Sciences (HUMSS), Science and Technology, Engineering, and Mathematics (STEM), Accounting, Business, and Management (ABM), Pre-Baccalaureate Maritime
  - TVL Specializations: Home Economics (HE), Information and Communications Technology (ICT)
- Colleges
  - College of Arts and Sciences
  - College of Business and Management
  - College of Computing and Information Science
  - College of Criminal Justice Education
  - College of Teacher Education
  - College of Tourism and Hospitality Management

== School's Radio Station ==
The school FM station is 89.5 DXSM Kabayaning Michaelinian FM. It was first heard on the 1st of December 2017. The radio station now is the arm of the school to promote Catholic Education and teachings.

== Official publication ==
The Saint Michael College of Caraga has its own publication called the Michaelinian Mirror, which is the only publication in the school. It publishes the latest news and events inside the school.
