= DXIC-FM =

Radio station in General Santos, Philippines

AWR Southern Mindanao (DXIC)
- General Santos; Philippines
- Broadcast area: South Cotabato, Sarangani and surrounding areas
- Frequency: 95.3 MHz
- Branding: Adventist World Radio 95.3

Programming
- Languages: English, Cebuano, Filipino
- Format: Religious Radio
- Network: Hope Radio

Ownership
- Owner: Hope Channel Philippines; (Iddes Broadcast Group)

History
- First air date: October 9, 2016
- Former call signs: DXXM

Technical information
- Licensing authority: NTC
- Power: 5 kW

Adventist World Radio 95.3 (DXIC 95.3 MHz) is an FM station in the Philippines owned and operated by Adventist Media. Its studios are located at Salvany St. cor. Mabuhay Rd., General Santos, and its transmitter is located at Alabel. The frequency is formerly owned by Matutum Broadcasting Network.
