= DXPQ =

Radio station in Butuan, Philippines

One FM Butuan (DXPQ)
- Butuan; Philippines
- Broadcast area: Agusan del Norte and surrounding areas
- Frequency: 95.9 MHz
- Branding: 95.9 One FM

Programming
- Languages: Cebuano, Filipino
- Format: Contemporary MOR, OPM
- Network: One FM

Ownership
- Owner: Radyo Pilipino Corporation

History
- First air date: 1963 (on 756 kHz); 2017 (on 95.9 MHz)
- Former call signs: DXJM (1963–2017)
- Former frequencies: 730 kHz (1963–1978); 756 kHz (1978–2017)

Technical information
- Licensing authority: NTC
- Power: 5,000 watts

DXPQ (95.9 FM), broadcasting as 95.9 One FM, is a radio station owned and operated by the Radio Corporation of the Philippines (now Radyo Pilipino Corporation). The station's studio and transmitter are located at Villa Kanangga, Butuan.

== History ==
DXJM was established in 1963 under Pacific Broadcasting Network, owned by Congressman Jose C. Aquino Sr. It was the second AM radio station in Butuan after Radio Mindanao Network's DXBC-AM. In 1983, Radio Corporation of the Philippines acquired the station and relaunched it as Radyo Asenso.

In 2017, the station moved to FM via 95.9 MHz and rebranded as One FM.
