= DXMS-FM =

Radio station in Siargao, Philippines

All Star FM (DXMS)
- Surigao City; Philippines
- Broadcast area: Surigao del Norte, Dinagat Islands and surrounding areas
- Frequency: 107.3 MHz
- Branding: 107.3 All Star FM

Programming
- Languages: Surigaonon, Filipino
- Format: Contemporary MOR, OPM

Ownership
- Owner: Subic Broadcasting Corporation

History
- First air date: 2016
- Former names: Radyo Trumpeta (2024-2025)
- Call sign meaning: Metro Surigao

Technical information
- Licensing authority: NTC
- Power: 5 kW

107.3 All Star FM (DXMS 107.3 MHz) is an FM station owned and operated by Subic Broadcasting Corporation. Its studios and transmitter are located at P-7 Navalca, Brgy. San Juan, Surigao City.
