= DXBB-FM =

Radio station in Butuan, Philippines

Wild FM Butuan (DXBB)
- Butuan; Philippines
- Broadcast area: Agusan del Norte and surrounding areas
- Frequency: 98.5 MHz

Programming
- Languages: Cebuano, Filipino, English
- Format: Contemporary MOR, Dance, OPM
- Network: Wild FM

Ownership
- Owner: UM Broadcasting Network

History
- First air date: 1995

Technical information
- Licensing authority: NTC
- Power: 5,000 watts
- ERP: 10,000 watts

DXBB (98.5 FM), broadcasting as 98.5 Wild FM, is a radio station owned and operated by UM Broadcasting Network. The station's studio and transmitter are located at the 2nd floor, Laurente Bldg., J.C. Aquino Avenue, Brgy. Tandang Sora, Butuan.

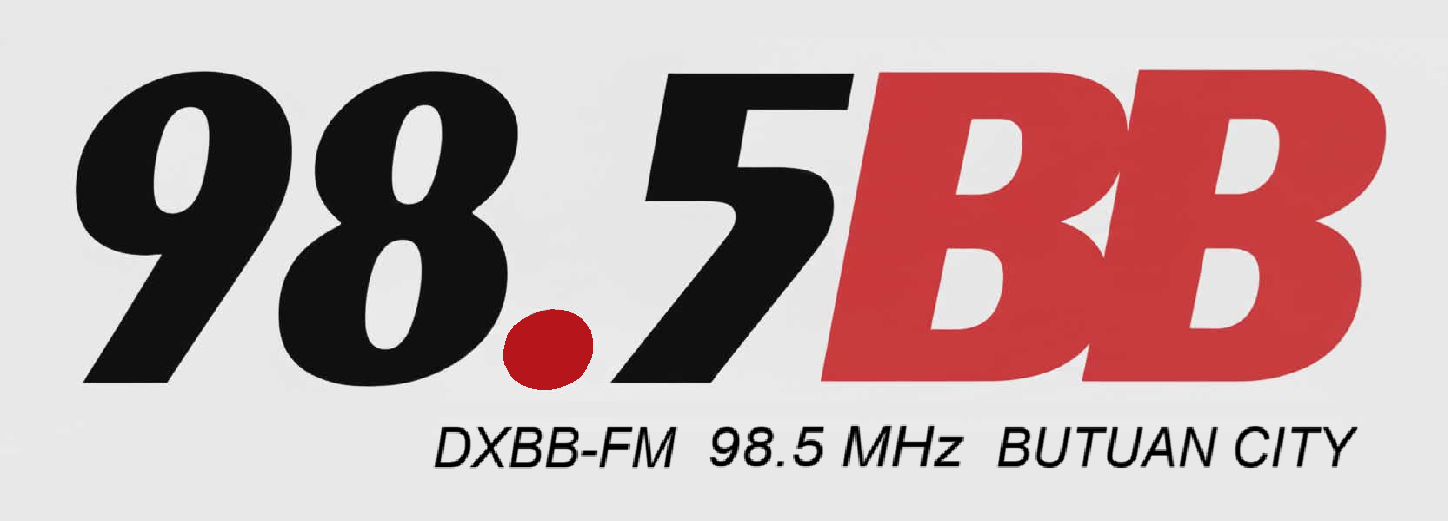
First DXBB-FM Logo
