= DXNS-TV =

Defunct television station in Butuan, Philippines

- Butuan; Philippines
- Channels: Analog: 7 (VHF); Digital: 27 (UHF) (test Broadcast); Virtual: 27
- Branding: Bee-TV 7 Butuan

Programming
- Affiliations: Independent

Ownership
- Owner: Northern Mindanao Broadcasting System
- Sister stations: 102.3 Bee FM

History
- First air date: 1995
- Last air date: December 31, 2024
- Former affiliations: GMA Network (1995–2014); People's Television Network (1986–1995, 2014–2015)

Technical information
- Licensing authority: NTC

Links
- Website: www.beetv7.com

DXNS-TV was an analog and digital television station owned by the Northern Mindanao Broadcasting System in Butuan. It was formerly affiliated with GMA Network and People's Television Network. Its studios and transmitters are located at 4th Floor L.T. & Sons Bldg., Montilla Boulevard, Butuan. The station is currently inactive on December 31, 2024.

== About DXNS-TV ==
In 2014, the NMBS affiliation did not renew GMA for almost 2 years then aired programs from PTV and later it became Bee TV. On September 4, 2015, GMA started to broadcast on UHF Channel 26 owned by the GMA Network itself. The new 5-kilowatt analog UHF relay TV station Butuan brings to 52 the total number of GMA transmitting stations nationwide.

== Digital Television ==
=== Digital channels ===
UHF Channel 27 (551.143 MHz)

Channel	Video	Aspect	Short Name	Programming	Broadcasting Hours	Notes
27.01	1080i	16:9	Bee TV	Bee TV (Main DXNS-TV programming)	7:00 AM to 11:00 PM (the next day)	Test Broadcast
27.31	240p	16:9	Bee TV 1seg	Bee TV	7:00 AM to 11:00 PM (the next day)	1seg broadcast
