= Nasipit =

Municipality in Agusan del Norte, Philippines

- Municipality
- Municipality of Nasipit
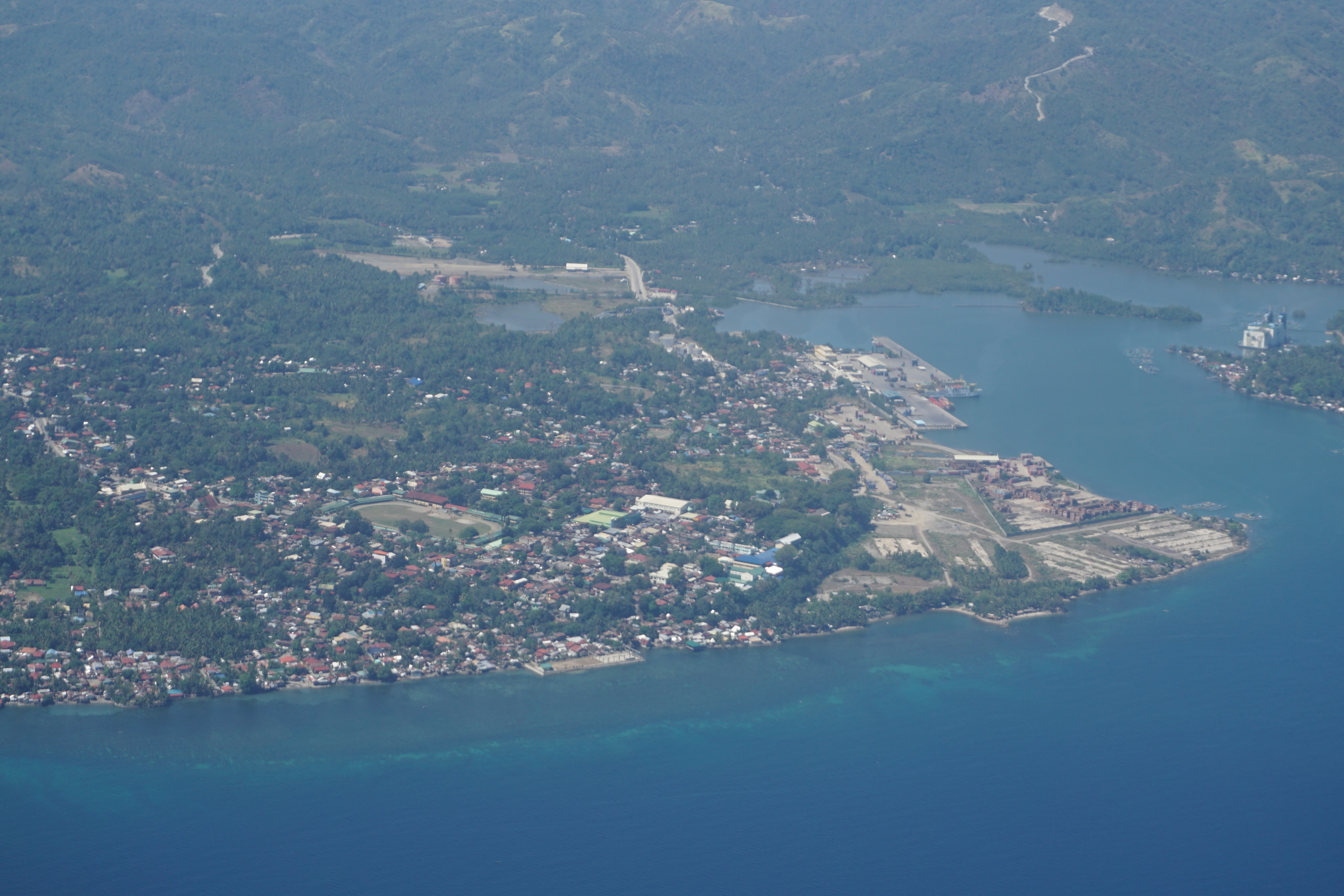
- Aerial view

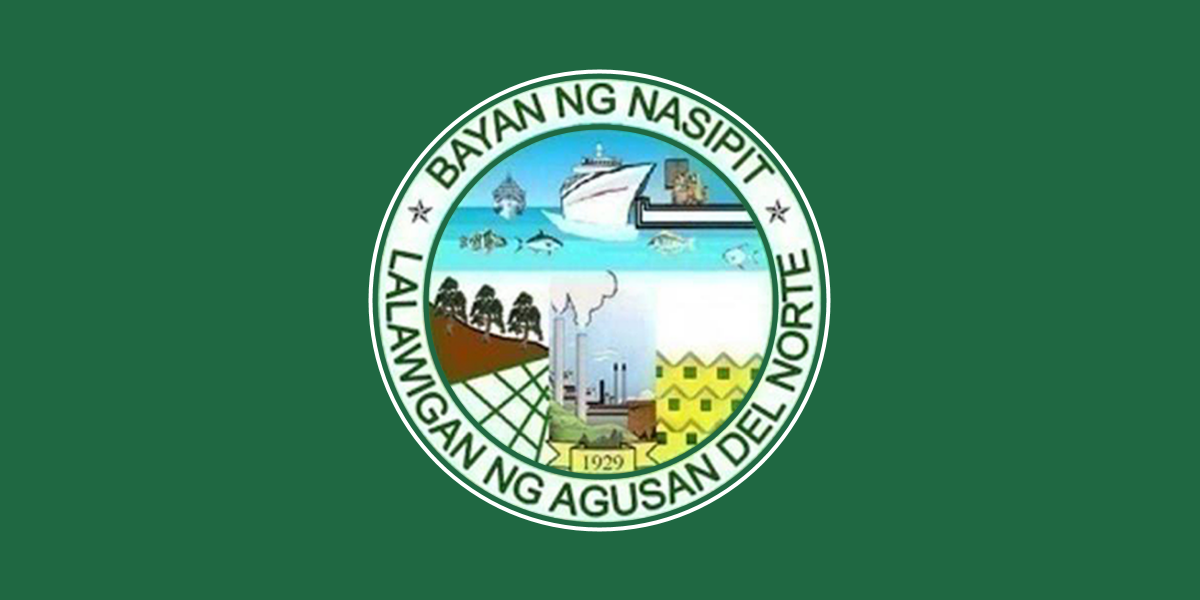
- Flag Seal

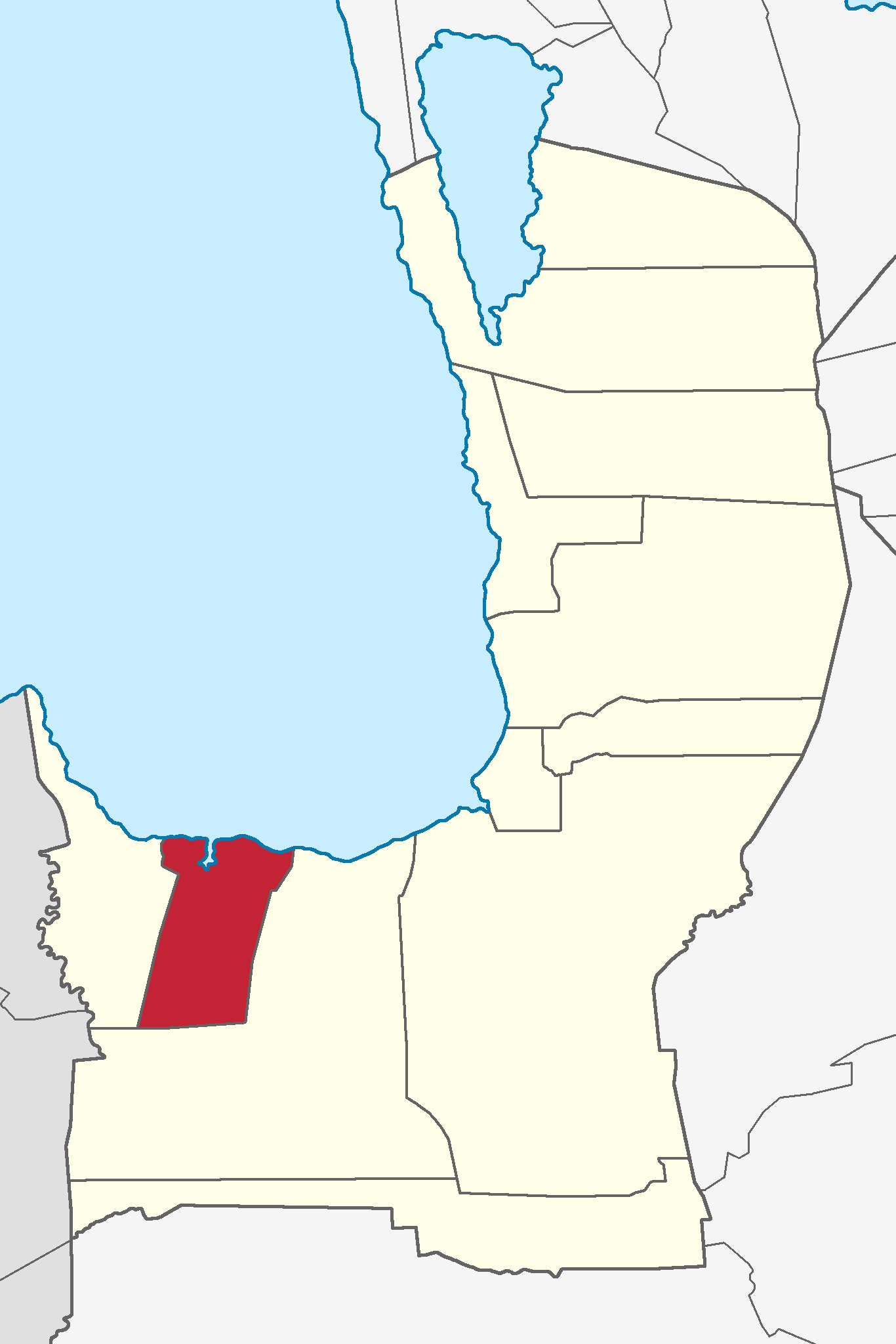
- Map of Agusan del Norte with Nasipit highlighted
- Interactive map of Nasipit
- Location within the Philippines
- Coordinates: 8°59′N 125°20′E
- Country: Philippines
- Region: Caraga
- Province: Agusan del Norte
- District: Lone district
- Founded: August 1, 1929
- Barangays: 19 (see Barangays)

Government
  - Type: Sangguniang Bayan
  - Mayor: Roscoe Democrito B. Plaza
  - Vice Mayor: Felipe Abigan
  - Representative: Dale Corvera
  - Municipal Council: Members: Bryan Dominguez; Dick Victor Carmona; Bongcor Corvera; Raul Olario; Christopher N. Timogan; Emelenda Deloso; Carlo Ometer; Arcelo Tamayo
  - Electorate: 29,798 voters (2025)

Area
  - Total: 144.4 km^{2} (55.8 sq mi)
- Elevation: 31 m (102 ft)
- Highest elevation: 375 m (1,230 ft)
- Lowest elevation: 0 m (0 ft)

Population (2024 census)
  - Total: 46,382
  - Density: 321.2/km^{2} (831.9/sq mi)
  - Households: 10,580

Economy
  - Income class: 1st municipal income class
  - Poverty incidence: 19.52% (2023)
  - Revenue: ₱ 226.8 million (2024)
  - Assets: ₱ 836.3 million (2024)
  - Expenditure: ₱ 123.1 million (2024)
  - Liabilities: ₱ 30.92 million (2024)

Service provider
  - Electricity: Agusan del Norte Electric Cooperative (ANECO)
  - Water: Nasipit Water District
- Time zone: UTC+8 (PST)
- ZIP code: 8602
- PSGC: 1600209000
- IDD : area code: +63 (0)85
- Native languages: Agusan; Butuanon; Cebuano; Higaonon; Tagalog
- Major religions: Roman Catholicism, Protestantism, Islam
- Feast date: September 29
- Catholic diocese: Diocese of Butuan
- Patron saint: Saint Michael the Archangel
- Website: www.nasipitsite.com

Nasipit, officially the Municipality of Nasipit (Cebuano: Lungsod sa Nasipit; Tagalog: Bayan ng Nasipit), is a municipality in the province of Agusan del Norte, Philippines. According to the 2024 census, it has a population of 46,382 people.

The Port of Nasipit is the major seaport or base port in Agusan del Norte. The Philippine Ports Authority (PPA) assigned PMO Nasipit as an International Base port.

== History ==
Nasipit is an industrial municipality situated on a promontory overlooking Nasipit Bay. Its industrial activity has historically been centered around the operations of the Nasipit Lumber Company and the Philippine Wallboard Corporation.

The shoreline of Nasipit assumes a claw-like from which “Nasip-it” was derived. Until 1929, Nasipit was a barrio of Butuan. The then Governor Guingona proposed to change the name Nasipit to “Aurora”. Due to the strong opposition of the early inhabitants, however, the word Na-si-pit was retained.

Little is documented about the early history of the town. According to local tradition, three women were once abducted by Moro raiders who periodically attacked the area to loot and plunder. These incursions caused widespread fear among the inhabitants, who would retreat to the forested hills for safety. Over time, these elevated areas were settled and eventually developed into what is now the poblacion. In response to the threat of raids, early settlers constructed a watchtower on the site now occupied by the Catholic church, serving as a lookout point to warn residents of approaching attackers.

The earliest settlers of this town were immigrants from Cebu, Leyte and the different parts of the archipelago threaded their way into this town to settle permanently.

The administration of the late Mayor Catalino Atupan marked the beginning of industrial development in what was then a relatively quiet town. During his nine-year tenure, he focused on improving tax collection and promoted the establishment of factories, capitalizing on the town’s strategic location and favorable shipping facilities. By the end of his term in 1946, the Nasipit Lumber Company Incorporated, operated by Fernandez Hermanos, had commenced operations, signaling the start of Nasipit’s economic growth and industrialization.

Nasipit was officially separated from the municipality of Butuan on August 1, 1929. It became a municipality by virtue of Executive Order No. 181 issued by Acting Governor General of the Philippines Eugene Allen Gilmore. A proposal to change its name to Aurora was initiated by then Governor Teofisto Guingona Sr., but due to the strong opposition from townsfolk, the name Nasipit was retained.

=== Third Republic ===
In 1949, the barrios of Carmen, Tagcatong, Cahayagan and San Agustin were separated from Nasipit and constituted into the new town of Carmen by virtue of Republic Act No. 380 which was approved on June 15, 1949.

=== Fifth Republic ===
On the morning of March 10, 1988, the frustrated murder hearing of Pablo Macapas at the Capitol Building in Butuan had just adjourned when Macapas fatally shot his accuser, former Nasipit mayor Mariano Corvera Sr., multiple times in the courtroom. In the aftermath of the assassination, murder charges were filed against Macapas and his counsel, Carmen Mayor Tranquilino O. Calo Jr. (to whom Macapas was alleged to have been his bodyguard), driver Bellarmino Alloco, and two others. Although investigating fiscal Macario Balansag determined there was prima facie evidence of murder against the respondents on June 22, he was later assassinated as well on August 19, 1988 on his way to the office. While Macapas was never caught, Mayor Calo and Allocod were later found guilty of murder by an RTC in March 1990, but pending his appeal before the Supreme Court, Calo died of myocardial infarction in February 1993, while the court later reversed Allocod's conviction by 1996 due to the prosecution's failure to prove his guilt beyond reasonable doubt.

== Geography ==
According to the Philippine Statistics Authority, the municipality has a land area of 144.4 square kilometres (55.8 sq mi) constituting 5.29% of the 2,730.24 square kilometres (1,054.15 sq mi) of total area of Agusan del Norte.

Nasipit occupies the north-western portion of the province. It is bounded in the east and south by Buenavista, west by Carmen, and north by Butuan Bay. It is 24 kilometres (15 mi) west of Butuan and 175 kilometres (109 mi) north-east of Cagayan de Oro. The town is accessible by sea through the inter-island vessels docking in the Nasipit International Seaport, to destinations such as Manila, Cebu, Bohol, and Cagayan de Oro.

=== Climate ===
Climate data for Nasipit, Agusan del Norte
Month	Jan	Feb	Mar	Apr	May	Jun	Jul	Aug	Sep	Oct	Nov	Dec	Year
Mean daily maximum °C (°F)	27 (81)	27 (81)	28 (82)	29 (84)	29 (84)	29 (84)	29 (84)	29 (84)	29 (84)	29 (84)	28 (82)	27 (81)	28 (83)
Mean daily minimum °C (°F)	22 (72)	22 (72)	22 (72)	22 (72)	23 (73)	24 (75)	24 (75)	24 (75)	24 (75)	23 (73)	23 (73)	23 (73)	23 (73)
Average precipitation mm (inches)	277 (10.9)	211 (8.3)	155 (6.1)	109 (4.3)	166 (6.5)	191 (7.5)	154 (6.1)	138 (5.4)	127 (5.0)	173 (6.8)	241 (9.5)	231 (9.1)	2,173 (85.5)
Average rainy days	22.7	19.1	20.0	19.9	25.9	27.6	27.6	26.1	25.1	26.8	24.3	23.2	288.3
Source: Meteoblue

=== Barangays ===
Nasipit is politically subdivided into 19 barangays. Each barangay consists of puroks while some have sitios.

Of these, five are urban and 14 are rural. Of the 19 barangays, nine are coastal: Cubi–Cubi, Ata–Atahon, Punta, Barangay 1 Apagan (Poblacion), Talisay (home to the Port of Nasipit), Santa Ana, Camagong, Amontay and Aclan.

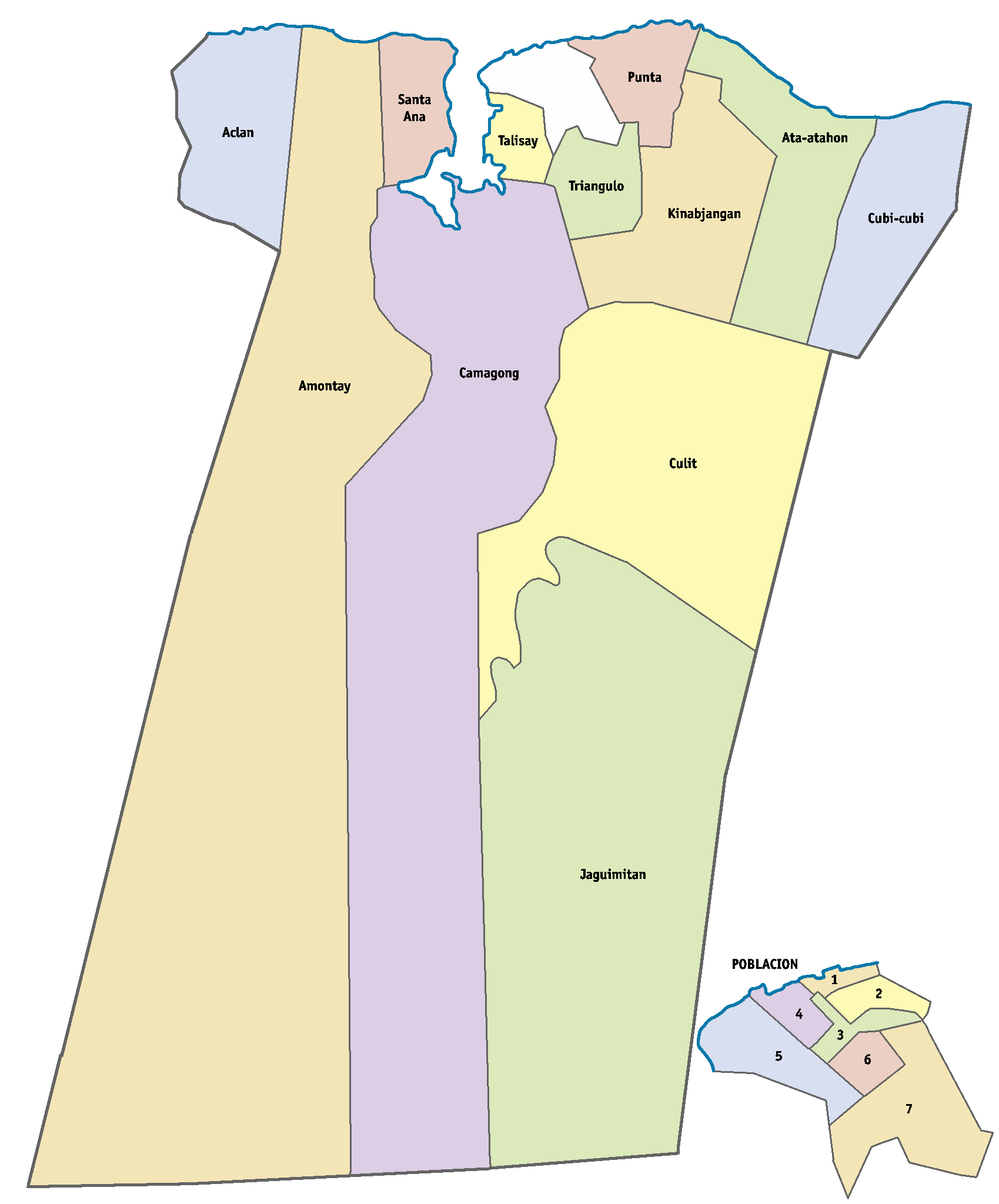
Political map of Nasipit

PSGC	Barangay	Population			±% p.a.	
		2024		2010		
160209001	Aclan	5.1%	2,354	2,217	▴	0.42%
160209002	Amontay	4.0%	1,840	1,658	▴	0.73%
160209004	Ata-atahon	3.9%	1,820	1,614	▴	0.84%
160209010	Barangay 1 (Poblacion)	2.4%	1,108	1,159	▾	−0.31%
160209011	Barangay 2 (Poblacion)	2.6%	1,197	1,216	▾	−0.11%
160209012	Barangay 3 (Poblacion)	1.8%	841	969	▾	−0.98%
160209013	Barangay 4 (Poblacion)	1.6%	731	822	▾	−0.81%
160209014	Barangay 5 (Poblacion)	2.7%	1,270	1,506	▾	−1.18%
160209015	Barangay 6 (Poblacion)	2.8%	1,319	1,466	▾	−0.73%
160209016	Barangay 7 (Poblacion)	4.3%	1,976	1,636	▴	1.32%
160209005	Camagong	11.2%	5,204	4,917	▴	0.39%
160209006	Cubi-Cubi	2.9%	1,338	1,291	▴	0.25%
160209007	Culit	6.6%	3,039	3,074	▾	−0.08%
160209008	Jaguimitan	3.6%	1,647	1,374	▴	1.27%
160209009	Kinabjangan	8.0%	3,714	3,591	▴	0.23%
160209017	Punta	7.9%	3,685	3,613	▴	0.14%
160209018	Santa Ana	5.0%	2,307	2,110	▴	0.62%
160209019	Talisay	8.0%	3,729	3,668	▴	0.11%
160209020	Triangulo	6.1%	2,838	2,762	▴	0.19%
	Total		46,382	40,663	▴	0.92%

== Demographics ==
Population census of Nasipit
Year	Pop.	±% p.a.
1903	611	—
1939	8,529	+7.60%
1948	12,502	+4.34%
1960	14,996	+1.53%
1970	23,306	+4.50%
1975	25,289	+1.65%
1980	29,905	+3.41%
1990	34,084	+1.32%
1995	34,255	+0.09%
2000	35,817	+0.96%
2007	38,096	+0.85%
2010	40,663	+2.40%
2015	41,957	+0.60%
2020	44,822	+1.40%
2024	46,382	+0.82%
Source: Philippine Statistics Authority

In the 2024 census, Nasipit had a population of 46,382. The population density was 320 inhabitants per square kilometre (830/sq mi).

== Economy ==
Poverty incidence of Nasipit (%)

Source: Philippine Statistics Authority

Nasipit was identified by the Caraga Regional Development Council (Caraga RDC) through Resolution Number 44 Series of 1996, as the Regional Agri-Industrial Growth Center (RAGC) of the Caraga Region. The municipality's identification as the RAGC and its inclusion in the Agusan Norte Special Economic Zone (ANSEZ) can be attributed to the establishment of the Nasipit Agusan del Norte Industrial Estate (NANIE). Covering a total of 296.9 hectares (734 acres) and located within barangays Camagong and Talisay, the proposed estate is envisaged to be an industrial nucleus or manufacturing center in the province where industrial plants, bonded warehouses, container yards and other industrial facilities will be located and made available to investors.

== Tourism ==
=== Town fiesta ===
Nasipit celebrates its annual fiesta every 29 September in honor to the town's patron saint, St. Michael, the Archangel, which includes thanksgiving mass and parade before the day of fiesta activities.

=== Araw ng Nasipit ===
Araw ng Nasipit (Day of Nasipit): The day commemorating the townhood anniversary of Nasipit from 1929 after it was a barrio of Butuan.

=== Saint Michael the Archangel Parish Church ===
Located at the heart of the town, it was built by MSC or Dutch priests during the 1960s. Recently, the altar of the church was constructed on its new image.

== Infrastructure ==
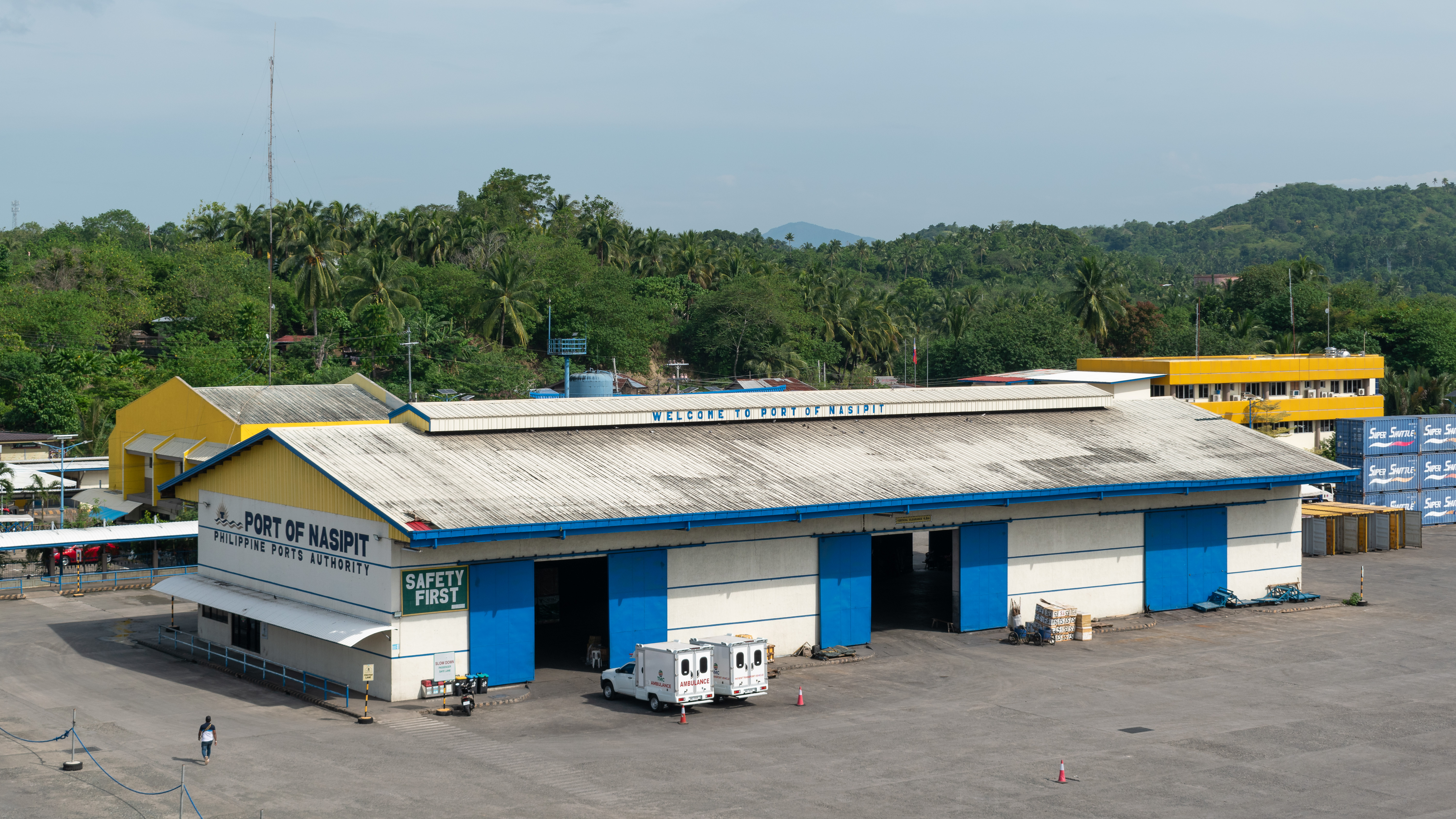
Port of Nasipit

=== Communications ===
The PLDT provides fixed line services. Wireless mobile communications services are provided by Smart Communications and Globe Telecommunications.

=== Transportation ===
Nasipit can be accessed through the Mindanao Pan-Philippine Highway.

==== Air ====
- Bancasi Airport of Butuan
- Laguindingan Airport of Cagayan de Oro

PAL and Cebu Pacific have daily flights from Manila to Butuan and vice versa.

==== Sea ====
Through the Port of Nasipit, there are several major shipping lines serving the Manila and Cebu routes: 2GO Travel, Cokaliong Shipping Lines, and Trans-Asia Shipping Lines. The Philippine Coast Guard — CG Detachment Nasipit is located at the Port of Nasipit near the Nasipit SeaPort Terminal.

==== Land ====
Nasipit can be reached by jeepney, van, multicabs and buses from Butuan in 45 minutes, and 4 hours to 5 hours by bus from Cagayan de Oro. The public mode of transportation in Nasipit is by tricycle similar in Butuan.

== Education ==
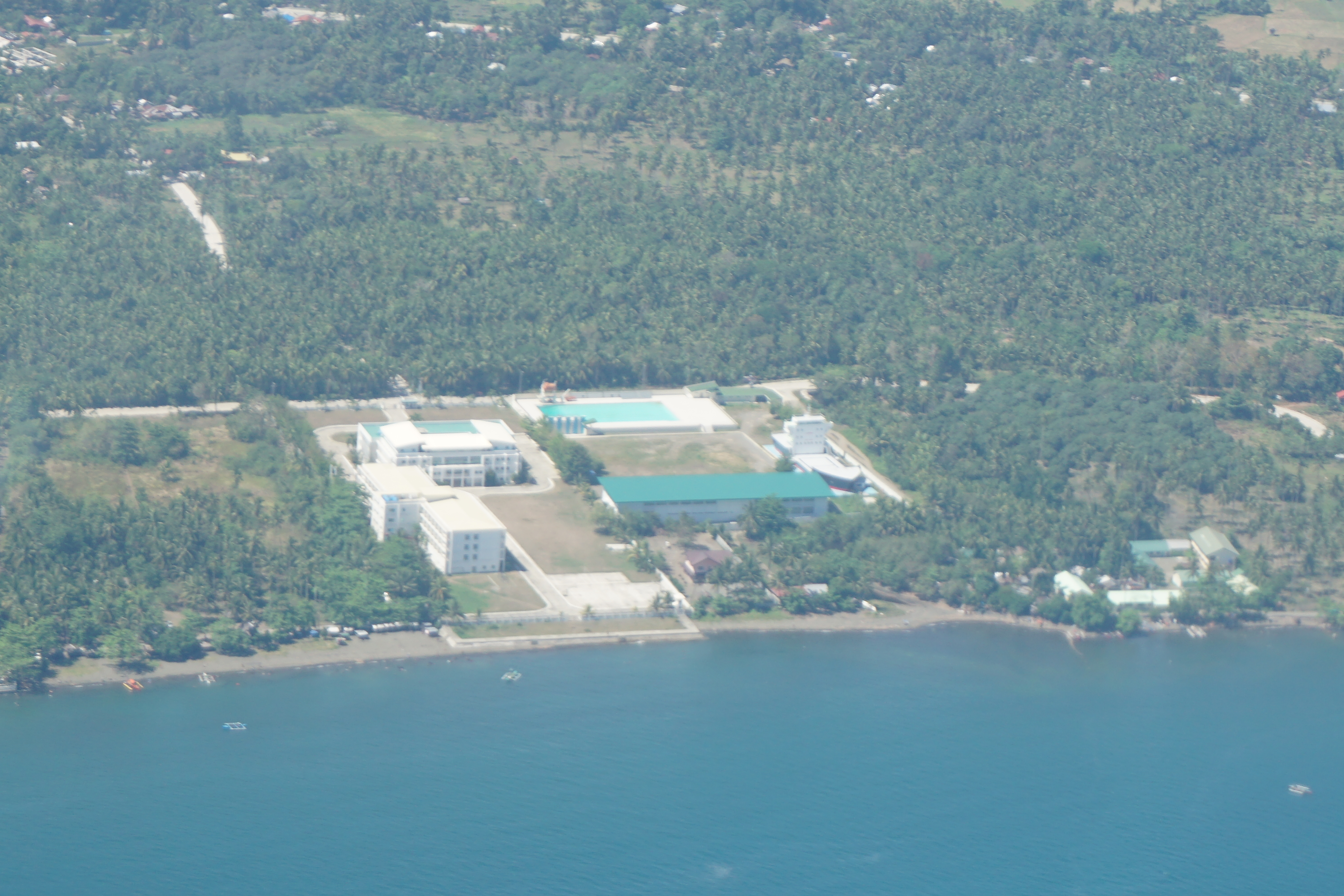
Aerial view of the Saint Joseph Institute of Technology Cubi-Cubi Campus

=== Elementary schools ===
- Aclan Elementary School
- Amontay Elementary School
- Ata-Atahon Elementary School
- Camagong Elementary School
- Cubi-Cubi Elementary School
- Culit Elementary School
- Jaguimitan Elementary School
- Kinabjangan Central Elementary School - East Central
- Nasipit Central Elementary School - West Central
- Northwestern Agusan Colleges
- Punta Elementary School
- Saint Michael College of Caraga
- Santa Ana Elementary School
- Talisay Central Elementary School SPED Center
- Triangulo Elementary School

=== High schools and colleges ===
- Saint Michael College of Caraga
- Ata-atahon National High School
- Culit National High School
- Jaguimitan National High School
- Nasipit National High School - Annex
- Nasipit National Vocational School
- Northwestern Agusan Colleges
- Saint Joseph Institute of Technology - Cubi-Cubi Campus

== Notable personalities ==
- Sylvia Sanchez, actress
