= DXIM-FM =

Radio station in Butuan, Philippines

DXIM
Butuan; Philippines
- Broadcast area: Agusan del Norte and surrounding areas
- Frequency: 93.5 MHz
- Branding: Hope Radio

Programming
- Languages: English, Cebuano, Filipino
- Format: Religious radio (Seventh-day Adventist Church)
- Network: Hope Radio

Ownership
- Owner: Adventist Media; (Digital Broadcasting Corporation)

History
- First air date: January 11, 2012
- Former call signs: DXHR (2012–2016)
- Former frequencies: 1323 kHz (2012–2016)

Technical information
- Licensing authority: NTC
- Power: 5,000 watts

Links
- Website: http://www.nemmadventist.org/hope-radio-philippines

DXIM (93.5 FM) Hope Radio is a radio station owned and operated by Adventist Media. The station's studio and transmitter are located at KM 3, Ba-an Hi-way, Butuan.

== History ==
In September 2011, the National Telecommunications Commission issued to the Seventh-day Adventist Church Provisional Authorities for two radio stations: DXHR-AM in Butuan and DXDB-FM in Iligan. On January 11, 2012, Hope Radio was inaugurated on 1323 kHz at its broadcast center located at the church's Northeastern Mindanao headquarters, becoming the second station of Hope Radio Philippines to be established after DXCR in Bukidnon. Not long after, it established its FM relay station via 93.5 MHz. In 2016, it closed down its AM operations and transferred them to FM.

Its daily broadcast has been focusing mainly on evangelism as well as sacred music while also included news and public service programs.

== Coverage ==
The station, while in AM and through its 10-kW power, had its signal reaching Northern Mindanao and Caraga regions, parts of Davao Region, as well as Leyte and Bohol islands. With the station currently broadcasting on FM, its signal now only reaches Caraga.
