= DXVA-FM =

Radio station in Butuan, Philippines

Brigada News FM Butuan (DXVA)

Butuan; Philippines
- Broadcast area: Agusan del Norte and surrounding areas
- Frequency: 96.7 MHz
- Branding: 96.7 Brigada News FM

Programming
- Languages: Cebuano, Filipino
- Format: Contemporary MOR, News, Talk
- Network: Brigada News FM

Ownership
- Owner: Brigada Mass Media Corporation; (Baycomms Broadcasting Corporation)

History
- First air date: July 1992
- Former call signs: DXEY (1992–2004)
- Former names: MRS (1992–1998); Jake (1998–2004)

Technical information
- Licensing authority: NTC
- Power: 5 kW

Links
- Webcast: Live Stream
- Website: brigada.ph

96.7 Brigada News FM (DXVA 96.7 MHz) is an FM station owned and operated by Brigada Mass Media Corporation. Its studio and transmitter are located along R. Calo St., Brgy. Diego Silang, Butuan.

== History ==
The station was formerly owned by Nation Broadcasting Corporation. It began operations in July 1992 as MRS 96.7 Most Required Song under the call letters DXEY. It carried an adult contemporary format. At that time, its studios and transmitter were located at the NBC Bldg. along Libertad St., sharing facilities with sister station DXRB.

On September 1, 1998, after NBC was acquired by PLDT Beneficial Trust Fund's broadcasting division MediaQuest Holdings, Inc. from the consortium of the Yabut family and then House Speaker Manny Villar, the station rebranded as Jake @ Rhythms 96.7 and switched to an Top 40 format. It went off the air in 2004.

In 2018, the station returned on-air after Brigada Mass Media Corporation acquired the frequency from NBC and changed to its current call letters. It was officially launched on September 28 of the same year under the Brigada News FM network.
