= DWGO-AM =

Radio station in Olongapo, Philippines

Radyo Serbisyo (DWGO)
- Olongapo; Philippines
- Broadcast area: Western Central Luzon
- Frequency: 1008 kHz
- Branding: DWGO 1008 Radyo Serbisyo

Programming
- Language: Filipino
- Format: News, Public Affairs, Talk

Ownership
- Owner: Subic Broadcasting Corporation
- Sister stations: 97.5 OKFM

History
- First air date: 1969
- Former frequencies: 1550 kHz (1969–1972)
- Call sign meaning: Gabay ng Olongapo

Technical information
- Licensing authority: NTC
- Power: 5,000 watts
- ERP: 20.0 Kw

DWGO (1008 AM) Radyo Serbisyo is a radio station owned and operated by Subic Broadcasting Corporation in the Philippines. The station's studio and transmitter are located at Admiral Royale Bldg., 17 St. cor. Anonas St., Brgy. West Bajac-Bajac, Olongapo.

== History ==
DWGO first went on air on July 29, 1969, as "Radio On The Go", being the flagship AM radio station of Subic Broadcasting Corporation with then frequency 1550 kHz at 2.5 KW. This is the day where in listeners of Olongapo City experienced listening through the airwaves of DWGO, airing news and current affairs program and pop format of music. It was shut down in 1972 at the start of Martial Law. in June 1976, DWGO returned under new management and by November 1978 in the new frequency of 1008 kHz — in response to the adaption of the current GE75 frequency bandplan.
