= DXMB-FM =

Radio station in Butuan, Philippines

Love Radio Butuan (DXMB)
- Butuan; Philippines
- Broadcast area: Agusan del Norte and surrounding areas
- Frequency: 95.1 MHz
- Branding: 95.1 Love Radio

Programming
- Languages: Cebuano, Filipino
- Format: Contemporary MOR, OPM
- Network: Love Radio

Ownership
- Owner: MBC Media Group; (Cebu Broadcasting Company)

History
- First air date: February 14, 1992
- Call sign meaning: Manila Broadcasting

Technical information
- Licensing authority: NTC
- Class: C/D/E
- Power: 5,000 watts
- ERP: 10,000 watts

Links
- Webcast: Listen Live
- Website: Love Radio Butuan

DXMB (95.1 FM), broadcasting as 95.1 Love Radio, is a radio station owned and operated by MBC Media Group through its licensee Cebu Broadcasting Company. Its studio and transmitter are located at the 2nd floor, Cesia Bldg., South Montilla Blvd., Butuan.

== Incidents ==
On October 4, 2012, an obsessed listener burned down the station on its old location at the 2nd floor, Montalban Bldg. along A.D. Curato St.
