= DXAM-FM =

Radio station in Butuan, Philippines

Click Radio (DXAM)
- Butuan; Philippines
- Broadcast area: Agusan del Norte and surrounding areas
- Frequency: 103.1 MHz
- Branding: 103.1 Click Radio

Programming
- Languages: Cebuano, Filipino
- Format: Contemporary MOR, News, Talk
- Network: Radyo Serbato

Ownership
- Owner: Hypersonic Broadcasting Center
- Operator: Click General Merchandise

History
- First air date: 2013
- Former names: Sunny FM (2013–2019)

Technical information
- Licensing authority: NTC
- Class: C, D, E
- Power: 5,000 watts
- ERP: 10,000 watts

DXAM (103.1 FM), broadcasting as 103.1 Click Radio, is a radio station owned by Hypersonic Broadcasting Center and operated by Click General Merchandise. The station's studio is located at the Bolo-Chavez Bldg., South Montilla Blvd. cor. Noli Me Tangere St., Brgy. Diego Silang, Butuan, while its transmitter is located at Purok 8, Sitio Bangkaling, Brgy. Nongnong, Butuan.

== History ==
The station was established in 2013 as Sunny FM under the management of Almont and Blue Waters Group of Companies. It aired a soft adult contemporary format. On November 5, 2019, it went off the air for operating without a business permit.

On January 18, 2021, it went back on air as Click Radio under the management of Click General Merchandise, a local establishment owned by Mr. Jerry Ytac. It switched to a news and music format under the Radyo Serbato network.
