= DXMK =

Radio station in Butuan, Philippines

Magik FM Butuan (DXMK)
- Butuan; Philippines
- Broadcast area: Agusan del Norte and surrounding areas
- Frequency: 97.5 MHz
- Branding: 97.5 Magik FM

Programming
- Languages: Cebuano, Filipino
- Format: Contemporary MOR, OPM
- Network: Magik FM

Ownership
- Owner: Century Broadcasting Network

History
- First air date: July 24, 1984
- Call sign meaning: Magik

Technical information
- Licensing authority: NTC
- Power: 5,000 watts

Links
- Website: http://magikfm.weebly.com/

DXMK (97.5 FM), broadcasting as 97.5 Magik FM, is a radio station owned and operated by Century Broadcasting Network. The station's studio is located at the 5th floor, D&V Plaza Bldg., Jose C. Aquino Ave., Butuan.
