= Subic Broadcasting Corporation =

Philippine media network

- Type: Statutory
- Industry: Broadcast
- Founded: July 29, 1969 (Radio); January 2011 (Television)
- Founder: James "Bong" Gordon
- Headquarters: Olongapo, Philippines
- Key people: Anne Marie Gordon; President

Subic Broadcasting Corporation is a Philippine media network in the province of Zambales. Its corporate office is located at the 5th Floor, Admiral Royale Hotel, 17th St. cor. Anonas St., Brgy. West Bajac-Bajac, Olongapo.

== Profile ==
SBC was first founded on July 29, 1969, with its AM station DWGO "Radio on the Go" under 1557 kHz. After being temporarily closed during martial law in 1972, it resumed operations in 1976, this time on 1008 kHz. On March 20, 1996, SBC launched its FM station DWOK 97.5 mHz. SBC soon acquired a franchise for radio and television operations, which began to broadcast regularly in January 2011 as DWAB TV 22—the first free TV channel in Olongapo city. In the early half of the year 2013, SBC partnered with TV5 to better serve the viewing public of Olongapo, Zambales, Bataan, and neighboring areas.

== Stations ==
=== AM stations ===
Branding	Callsign	Frequency	Location
Radyo Serbisyo	DWGO	1008 kHz	Olongapo

=== FM stations ===
Branding	Callsign	Frequency	Location	Operator
OKFM	DWOK	97.5 MHz	Olongapo	
Jam FM	DZSB	95.7 MHz	Bansud	
Maxx FM	DWEO	107.3 MHz	Bulalacao	
KMFM Partido	DWDX	99.3 MHz	Goa	Bicol Media Network Group
Radyo Siram	—N/a	101.1 MHz	Legazpi, Albay	Joshua Martinez Jr.
XFM Palawan	DWGE	104.7 MHz	Puerto Princesa	Y2H Broadcasting Network
Radyo Himulat	DYSV	90.5 MHz	Estancia	
K5 News FM Culasi	DYJA	95.9 MHz	Culasi	5K Broadcasting Network
K5 News FM Kabankalan	DYXU	102.9 MHz	Kabankalan	5K Broadcasting Network
K5 News FM Sagay	DYJU	89.7 MHz	Sagay	5K Broadcasting Network
XFM San Carlos	—N/a	98.9 MHz	San Carlos	Y2H Broadcasting Network
Citylite FM	DYIK	94.3 MHz	Tanjay	
LCM FM Pagadian	DXLP	103.9 MHz	Pagadian	Loud Cry Ministries
Radio Kilat	DXQB	107.7 MHz	Quezon, Bukidnon	Kilat RadioKast
LCM FM Baluyan	DXML	95.9 MHz	Malalag	Loud Cry Ministries
Happy FM	DXXM	97.7 MHz	Carmen	People's Radio and Broadcasting Services
XFM Mati	DXIS	99.1 MHz	Mati	Y2H Broadcasting Network
Radyo Latigo	DXSU	107.3 MHz	Koronadal	
XFM Kidapawan	—N/a	91.1 MHz	Kidapawan	Y2H Broadcasting Network
All Star FM	DXMS	107.3 MHz	Surigao City	

=== Former TV stations ===
Branding	Callsign	Channel	Location	Type
SBC TV 22	DWAB-TV	TV-22	Olongapo	Originating (Under repair)
