= DXBR =

Radio station in Butuan, Philippines

Bombo Radyo Butuan (DXBR)

Butuan; Philippines
- Broadcast area: Agusan del Norte and surrounding areas
- Frequency: 981 kHz
- Branding: DXBR Bombo Radyo

Programming
- Languages: Cebuano, Filipino
- Format: News, Public Affairs, Talk, Drama
- Network: Bombo Radyo

Ownership
- Owner: Bombo Radyo Philippines; (People's Broadcasting Service, Inc.)

History
- First air date: February 14, 1995
- Call sign meaning: Bombo Radyo

Technical information
- Licensing authority: NTC
- Power: 10,000 watts
- Transmitter coordinates: 08°56′31″N 125°30′46″E

Links
- Webcast: Listen Live
- Website: Bombo Radyo Butuan

DXBR (981 AM) Bombo Radyo is a radio station owned and operated by Bombo Radyo Philippines through its licensee People's Broadcasting Service. Its studio, offices and transmitter are located at Bombo Radyo Broadcast Center, Purok 6, National Highway Barangay Ampayon, Butuan.
