= DXDB-FM =

Radio station in Iligan, Philippines

Hope Radio Iligan
Iligan; Philippines
- Broadcast area: Lanao del Norte, parts of Lanao del Sur
- Frequency: 100.1 MHz
- Branding: 100.1 Hope Radio

Programming
- Languages: English, Filipino, Cebuano
- Format: Religious Radio
- Network: Hope Radio

Ownership
- Owner: Adventist Media; (Digital Broadcasting Corporation)

History
- First air date: September 11, 2012
- Call sign meaning: Digital Broadcasting

Technical information
- Licensing authority: NTC
- Power: 1 kW

100.1 Hope Radio (DXDB 100.1 MHz) is an FM station owned and operated by Adventist Media. Its studios and transmitter are located at Miguel Sheker Ave., Iligan.
