= Hope Channel Philippines =

Television channel in the Philippines

Gateway UHF Television Broadcasting
- Type: Private
- Industry: Broadcast media
- Founded: 1992
- Headquarters: Silang, Cavite, Philippines
- Key people: Johnster Joe Calibod (President, Hope Channel Philippines) Demuel Gambol (Broadcast Operations Manager, Hope Channel Philippines)
- Parent: Seventh-day Adventist Church
- Website: www.hopetv.ph

Hope Channel Philippines
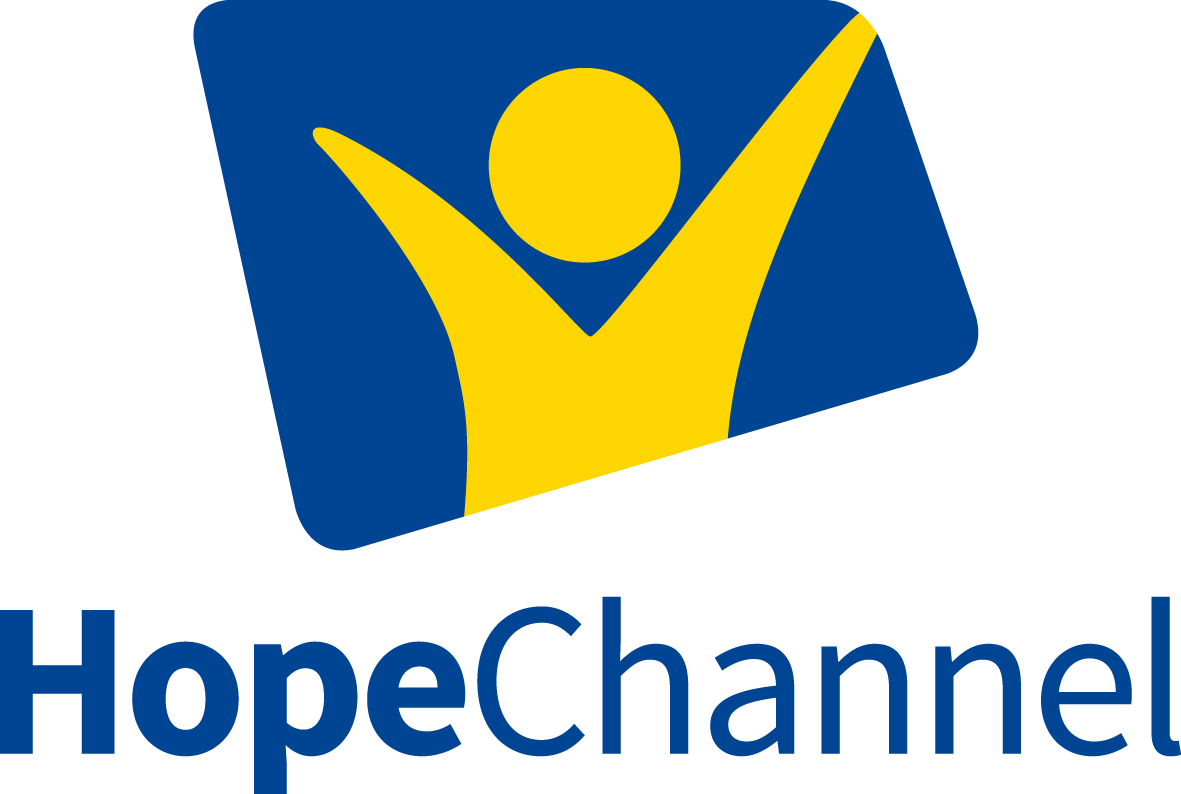
- Country: Philippines
- Broadcast area: Philippines
- Network: Seventh-day Adventist Church
- Headquarters: Silang, Cavite, Philippines (main office); Pasay, Philippines (Luzon); Cebu City, Philippines (Visayas); Cagayan de Oro, Philippines (Mindanao)

Programming
- Languages: English, Filipino, Cebuano
- Picture format: 16:9 480i (SDTV); 720p/1080i (HDTV)

Ownership
- Owner: Seventh-day Adventist Church (Hope Channel); Gateway UHF Television Broadcasting

History
- Launched: September 26, 2010

Links
- Website: www.hopetv.ph

Availability

Terrestrial
- Digital (ISDB-T): Channel 45 (45.06) Metro Manila; Channel 44 (44.04) Baguio; Channel 44 (44.03) Pampanga; Channel 25 (25.01) Cebu

Streaming media
- Hopetv.ph: Watch Live

Hope Channel Philippines is a religious network of the Seventh-day Adventist Church in the Philippines. Its TV stations are owned by Gateway UHF Television Broadcasting, while its radio stations are either owned and/or operated by Digital Broadcasting Corporation or AdventistMedia. Founded and launched on September 26, 2010, in the South Philippines and in January 2011 in Luzon and Visayas.

In Luzon, this station aired from 5am-12 midnight on UHF Channel 45, Manila, but it became a full-time station in mid-2017 after Gateway UHF Broadcasting quietly ended their ties with 3ABN. The network programming is similar to Hope Channel International programming but in Filipino language.

== History ==
Gateway UHF TV was formed in 1992 when it was granted a legislative franchise to operate television stations on the UHF band under Republic Act 7223.

On June 1, 2001, Gateway UHF TV began its operations on UHF 45 in Metro Manila, carrying HopeTV of the Seventh-Day Adventist Church (SDA). In 2011, with the arrival of global Christian lifestyle network Hope Channel in the Philippines, the SDA acquired Gateway UHF Television Broadcasting. In 2015, the company began broadcasting on digital terrestrial television.

In 2018, Gateway UHF TV's broadcast franchise was renewed.

== TV stations ==
=== Digital ===
Branding	Callsign	Channel	Power	Frequency	Location
Hope Channel Manila	DWVN	45	3.5 kW	659.143 MHz	Carmona, Cavite
Hope Channel Baguio	DWFB (Note: Licensed to Global Satellite Technology Services, Inc. (affiliate))	44	1.5 kW	653.143 MHz	Baguio
Hope Channel Pampanga (Note: Off the air.)	DWFU	44	0.5 kW	653.143 MHz	San Fernando, Pampanga
Hope Channel Naga	DWFA	48	1.5 kW	677.143 MHz	Naga, Camarines Sur
Hope Channel Cebu	DYGA	25	3.5 kW	539.143 MHz	Cebu City

=== Analog (Inactive) ===
Branding	Callsign	Channel	Power	Location
Hope Channel Bacolod	DYGB	24	5 kW	Bacolod
Hope Channel Zamboanga	DXGA	25	5 kW	Zamboanga City
Hope Channel Cagayan de Oro	DXGC	25	5 kW	Cagayan de Oro
Hope Channel Davao	DXGD	25	5 kW	Davao City

=== Cable ===
Provider	Channel	Coverage
Cignal TV	TBA	Nationwide
SatLite	103	Nationwide
GSat	32	Nationwide
Parasat	17	Regional

== Radio stations ==
Aside from running stations, part of programming from AWR (including its flagship program Tinig ng Pag-Asa) can be also heard on various stations via syndication.

Branding	Callsign	Frequency	Location
AWR Hope Radio Bukidnon (Note: Licensed to MVC Media Center)	DXCR	1386 kHz	Valencia
AWR Hope Radio Bukidnon	—N/a	96.9 MHz	Valencia
AWR Southern Mindanao	DXIC	95.3 MHz	General Santos
AWR Hope Radio Davao	DXMA	104.3 MHz	Davao
Radyo sa Paglaum	—N/a	106.8 MHz	Tagum
AWR Hope Radio Mati	DXMH	94.3 MHz	Mati
AWR Hope Radio Kidapawan	—N/a	100.3 MHz	Kidapawan
AWR Hope Radio Butuan	DXIM	93.5 MHz	Butuan
AWR Hope Radio Western Mindanao	DXBH	103.7 MHz	Tangub
AWR Hope Radio Wao	—N/a	106.7 MHz	Wao
AWR Hope Radio Toledo	DYAM	106.3 MHz	Toledo
AWR Bacolod	—N/a	92.7 MHz	Bacolod
AWR Puerto Princesa	—N/a	105.5 MHz	Puerto Princesa
AWR Manila	DWAV (Note: Owned by Blockbuster Broadcasting System)	89.1 MHz	Metro Manila
AWR Urdaneta	—N/a	88.8 MHz	Urdaneta
AWR Aurora	—N/a	97.5 MHz	Baler
AWR Ilocos Sur	—N/a	88.5 MHz	Santa Cruz
AWR Cadaratan West	—N/a	89.1 MHz	Bacarra

=== Defunct stations ===
Callsign	Frequency	Location
DXHR	1323 kHz	Butuan
DXDB	100.1 MHz	Iligan
DXHD	107.1 MHz	Matanao

== See also ==
- Seventh-day Adventist Church
- Media ministries of the Seventh-day Adventist Church
