= DXNS-FM =

Defunct radio station in Butuan, Philippines

DXNS
- Butuan; Philippines
- Broadcast area: Agusan del Norte and surrounding areas
- Frequency: 102.3 MHz

Programming
- Format: Silent

Ownership
- Owner: Northern Mindanao Broadcasting System
- Sister stations: DXNS-TV

History
- First air date: February 11, 2000
- Last air date: 2023
- Former names: Killerbee (February 11, 2000–June 23, 2008; 2010-2014); Caraga's Hit Radio (2008–2010); Bee FM (2014-2023)
- Call sign meaning: NMBS

Technical information
- Licensing authority: NTC

102.3 Bee FM logo from 2014 to 2023.

DXNS (102.3 FM) was a radio station owned and operated by the Northern Mindanao Broadcasting System.

== History ==
The station was established on February 11, 2000 as Killer Bee under the management of Quest Broadcasting. It went off the air on June 23, 2008.

A few months later, it returned on air, this time as Caraga's Hit Radio. Despite under new management, it retained its affiliation with Quest. In 2010, it brought back the Killer Bee branding. In 2014, a year after its sister stations started carrying the Magic branding, it renamed to Bee FM.

In 2023, Bee FM went off the air due to the owner's expired franchise. During its existence, it was located at the 4th Floor, L.T. & Sons Bldg., Montilla Blvd., Butuan.
