= DXBN-AM =

Radio station in Butuan, Philippines

Radyo Pilipinas Butuan (DXBN)
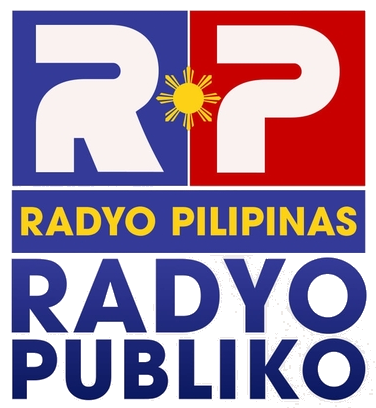
- Butuan; Philippines
- Broadcast area: Agusan del Norte and surrounding areas
- Frequency: 792 kHz
- Branding: Radyo Pilipinas

Programming
- Languages: Cebuano, Filipino
- Format: News, Public Affairs, Talk, Government Radio
- Network: Radyo Pilipinas

Ownership
- Owner: Presidential Broadcast Service

History
- First air date: 1990
- Call sign meaning: Butuan

Technical information
- Licensing authority: NTC
- Power: 5,000 watts

Links
- Webcast: DXBN Radyo Pilipinas LIVE Audio
- Website: PBS

DXBN (792 AM) Radyo Pilipinas is a radio station owned and operated by the Presidential Broadcast Service. The station's studio is located at the City Hall Complex, Brgy. Doongan, Butuan. DXBN is the first station to undergo studio & equipment rehabilitation through Radio Rehab program.
