= DXBC-AM =

Radio station in Butuan, Philippines

RMN Butuan (DXBC)
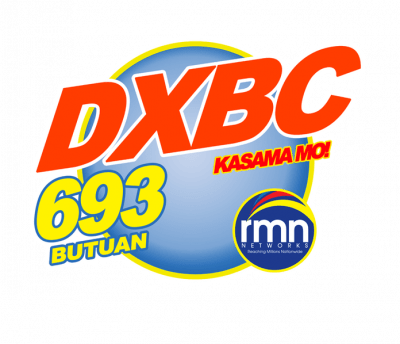
- Butuan; Philippines
- Broadcast area: Agusan del Norte and surrounding areas
- Frequency: 693 kHz
- Branding: DXBC RMN Butuan

Programming
- Languages: Cebuano, Filipino
- Format: News, Public Affairs, Talk, Drama
- Network: Radyo Mo Nationwide

Ownership
- Owner: Radio Mindanao Network
- Sister stations: 100.7 iFM

History
- First air date: August 17, 1955
- Former frequencies: 690 kHz (1955–1978)
- Call sign meaning: Butuan City

Technical information
- Licensing authority: NTC
- Class: CDE
- Power: 10,000 watts

Links
- Website: RMN Butuan

DXBC (693 AM) RMN Butuan is a radio station owned and operated by the Radio Mindanao Network. The station's studio and transmitter are located along I. Elloso St., Barangay Imadejas, Butuan. Established on August 17, 1955, DXBC is the pioneer AM station in the city.
