= DXSN =

DXSN may refer to the following radio stations in Caraga Region, Philippines:

- DXSN-AM (1017 AM), broadcasting in Surigao City, branded as Radyo Magbalantay
- DXSN-FM (92.7 FM), broadcasting in San Francisco, Agusan del Sur, branded as Radyo Pilipinas
