= DXGG =

Happy FM (DXGG)
- Malaybalay; Philippines
- Broadcast area: Bukidnon
- Frequency: 107.1 MHz
- Branding: Happy FM 107.1

Programming
- Languages: Cebuano, Filipino
- Format: Contemporary MOR, News, Talk

Ownership
- Owner: Iddes Broadcast Group
- Sister stations: Radyo Abante Maramag

History
- First air date: 2013
- Call sign meaning: Gino Garcia

Technical information
- Licensing authority: NTC
- Power: 5,000 watts

DXGG (107.1 FM), broadcasting as Happy FM 107.1, is a radio station owned and operated by Iddes Broadcast Group. Its studios is located at the 2nd Floor, Montana Bldg., Moreno St. cor. San Isidro St., Brgy. 1, Malaybalay, and its transmitter is located in Brgy. Magsaysay, Malaybalay.

== History ==
DXGG was established in February 2013 by engineer Gino Armstrong Garcia, while its application was approved by the National Telecommunications Commission through its order in September. The station was initially located at a rented place in Brgy. Magsaysay, where its transmitter is located to this day. In 2014, the station transferred its studios its present location in Brgy. 1. Studio transmitter link is used for broadcasts.

The station produces local programming. Unlike other FM stations that usually air music, its format also includes news, commentary, and public affairs.

One of the personnel was involved in a libel complaint filed by provincial governor Jose Maria Zubiri Jr. in 2014, stemming from his comments on certain issues in the province.
