= DWIN =

DWIN may refer to:

- DWIN-AM, an AM radio station broadcasting in Dagupan, branded as Radyo Agila
- DWIN-FM, an FM radio station broadcasting in Roxas, branded as Win FM
