= DXKS =

DXKS may refer to the following radio stations in the Philippines:

- DXKS-AM, 1080 kHz in Surigao City, branded as Radyo Ronda
- DXKS-FM (Tagum), 95.1 MHz in Tagum, branded as Energy FM
- DXKS (Cagayan de Oro), 96.9 MHz in Misamis Oriental
