= DXBS =

Philippine radio station

Wow FM
Bislig; Philippines
- Broadcast area: Southern Caraga and surrounding areas
- Frequency: 99.3 MHz
- Branding: 99.3 Wow FM

Programming
- Languages: Cebuano, Filipino
- Format: Contemporary MOR, News, Talk

Ownership
- Owner: Iddes Broadcast Group

History
- First air date: July 2002
- Former frequencies: 101.1 MHz (2002–2005)
- Call sign meaning: BiSlig

Technical information
- Licensing authority: NTC
- Power: 5 kW

99.3 Wow FM (DXBS 99.3 MHz) is an FM station owned and operated by Iddes Broadcast Group. Its studios and transmitter are located at #3 Polina Village, Brgy. Mangagoy, Bislig.
