= Iddes Broadcast Group =

Philippine radio network

Iddes Broadcast Group, Inc.
- Type: Private
- Industry: Radio network
- Founded: 2001
- Headquarters: Roxas, Isabela, Philippines

Iddes Broadcast Group, Inc. is a Philippine radio network. Its corporate office is located at 3/F, Kingsheen Bldg., Don Mariano Marcos Ave., Roxas, Isabela. IBG operates a number of stations across regional places in the Philippines.

== IBGI stations ==
Branding	Callsign	Frequency	Location
Win FM	DWIN	107.5 MHz	Roxas
Core FM	DWIA	99.7 MHz	Vigan
Air1 Radio	DWCH	91.9 MHz	Batangas City
Max Radio	DWIF	89.5 MHz	Lucena
DWXR	DWXR	101.7 MHz	Calapan
Fresh FM	—N/a	95.7 MHz	Libon
Friends Tayo	DWFR	93.5 MHz	Bulan
Hot FM	—N/a	93.5 MHz	Tubigon
The Voice FM	DYIB	96.1 MHz	Tanjay
Home FM	DXIE	102.9 MHz	Calamba
Grace FM	DXGC	101.3 MHz	Bacolod
Radyo Abante	DXGT	92.1 MHz	Maramag
Happy FM	DXGG	107.1 MHz	Malaybalay
Joy FM Surigao	DXYL	94.9 MHz	Surigao City
Sure FM	DXBP	97.5 MHz	Tandag
Radyo Pilipinas	DXSN	92.7 MHz	San Francisco
Wow FM	DXBS	99.3 MHz	Bislig
Joy FM Kidapawan	DXIA	105.7 MHz	Kidapawan
Good Vibes Radio	—N/a	90.5 MHz	Koronadal
Supreme FM	DXPM	91.9 MHz	Digos
Joy FM Caraga	DXIF	105.7 MHz	Caraga
Radyo Birada	—N/a	92.5 MHz	San Isidro
