= DXBP =

Philippine radio station

Sure FM (DXBP)
Tandag; Philippines
- Broadcast area: Northern Surigao del Sur, parts of Agusan del Sur
- Frequency: 97.5 MHz
- Branding: 97.5 Sure FM

Programming
- Languages: Surigaonon, Filipino
- Format: Contemporary MOR, News, Talk

Ownership
- Owner: Iddes Broadcast Group
- Operator: VTP Broadcast Venture, Inc.

Technical information
- Licensing authority: NTC
- Power: 5,000 watts

DXBP (97.5 FM), broadcasting as 97.5 Sure FM, is a radio station owned by Iddes Broadcast Group and operated by VTP Broadcast Venture, Inc. The station's studio is located in Tandag.
