= DWXR =

Calapan; Philippines
- Broadcast area: Northern Mindoro, parts of Batangas
- Frequency: 101.7 MHz
- Branding: DWXR 101.7

Programming
- Language: Filipino
- Format: Contemporary MOR, News, Talk

Ownership
- Owner: Iddes Broadcast Group
- Operator: Hirxay Advertising & Media Services

History
- First air date: 2011

Technical information
- Licensing authority: NTC
- Power: 1 kW
- ERP: 5 kW

Links
- Website: dwxr1017fm.weebly.com

DWXR (101.7 FM) is a radio station in the Philippines owned by Iddes Broadcast Group and operated by Hirxay Advertising & Media Services. Its studios and transmitter are located at the 3rd Floor, Palmero Bldg., Brgy. Tawiran, Calapan.
