= DXPM =

Philippines radio station

Supreme FM (DXPM)
- Digos; Philippines
- Broadcast area: Davao del Sur, parts of Davao City and Davao Occidental
- Frequency: 91.9 MHz
- Branding: 91.9 Supreme FM

Programming
- Languages: Cebuano, Filipino
- Format: Contemporary MOR, News, Talk

Ownership
- Owner: Iddes Broadcast Group

History
- First air date: December 8, 2012
- Call sign meaning: Power Media

Technical information
- Licensing authority: NTC
- Power: 5,000 watts

DXPM (91.9 FM), broadcasting as 91.9 Supreme FM, is a radio station owned and operated by Iddes Broadcast Group. The station's studio is located in Derequito Bldg., Dimsum Diner Compound, Rizal Ave., Digos.
