= DXYL =

Radio station in Surigao City, Philippines

Joy FM Surigao (DXYL)
Surigao City; Philippines
- Broadcast area: Surigao del Norte, Dinagat Islands and surrounding areas
- Frequency: 94.9 MHz
- Branding: 94.9 Joy FM

Programming
- Languages: Surigaonon, Filipino
- Format: Contemporary MOR, News, Talk

Ownership
- Owner: Iddes Broadcast Group

History
- First air date: July 18, 2014

Technical information
- Licensing authority: NTC
- Power: 5 kW

94.9 Joy FM (DXYL 94.9 MHz) is an FM station owned and operated by Iddes Broadcast Group. Its studios and transmitter are located at the 5th Floor, Trimix Enterprises Bldg., San Nicolas St., Brgy. Taft, Surigao City.
