= Surigao City =

Capital city of Surigao del Norte, Philippines

- Component city
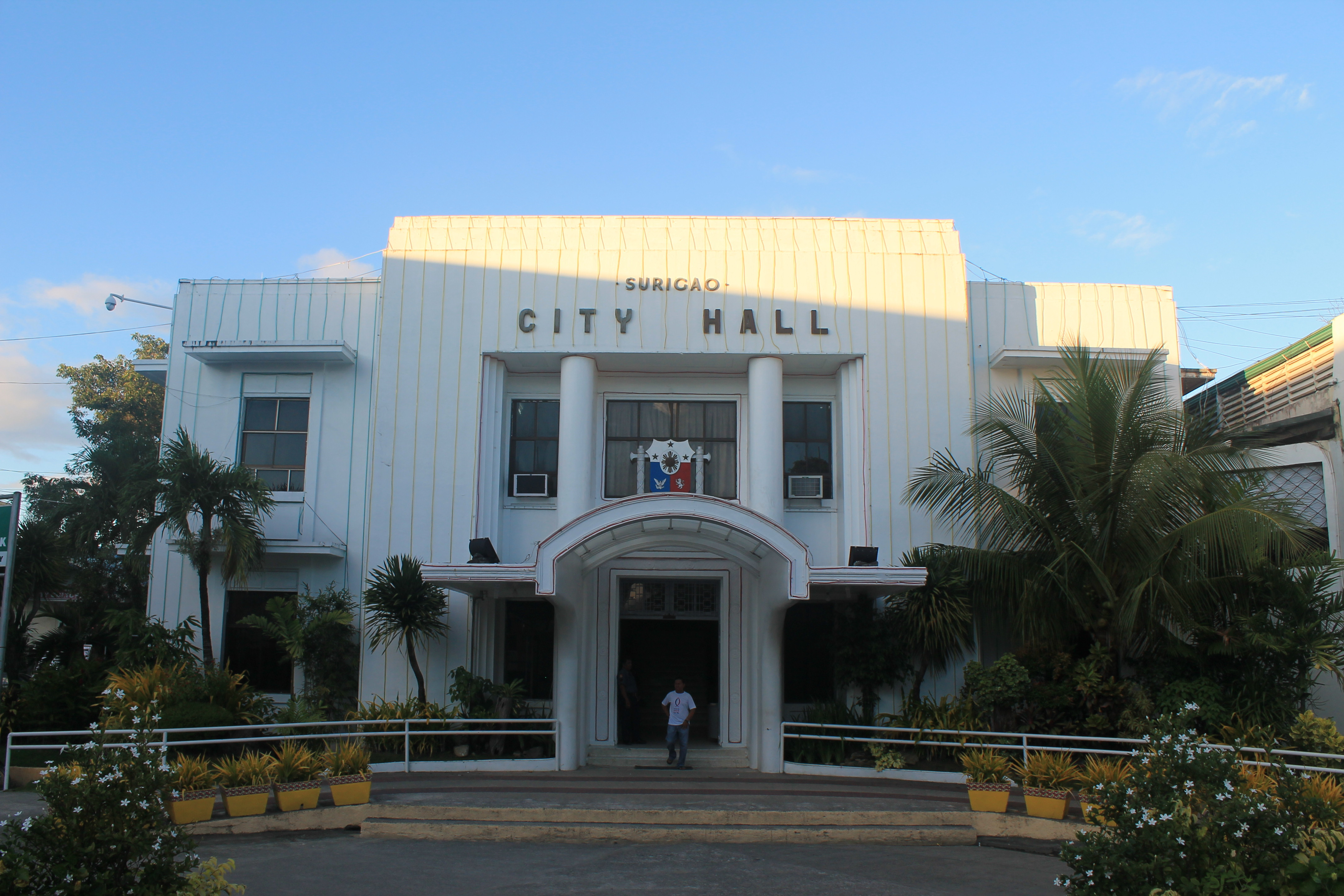
- Surigao City Hall

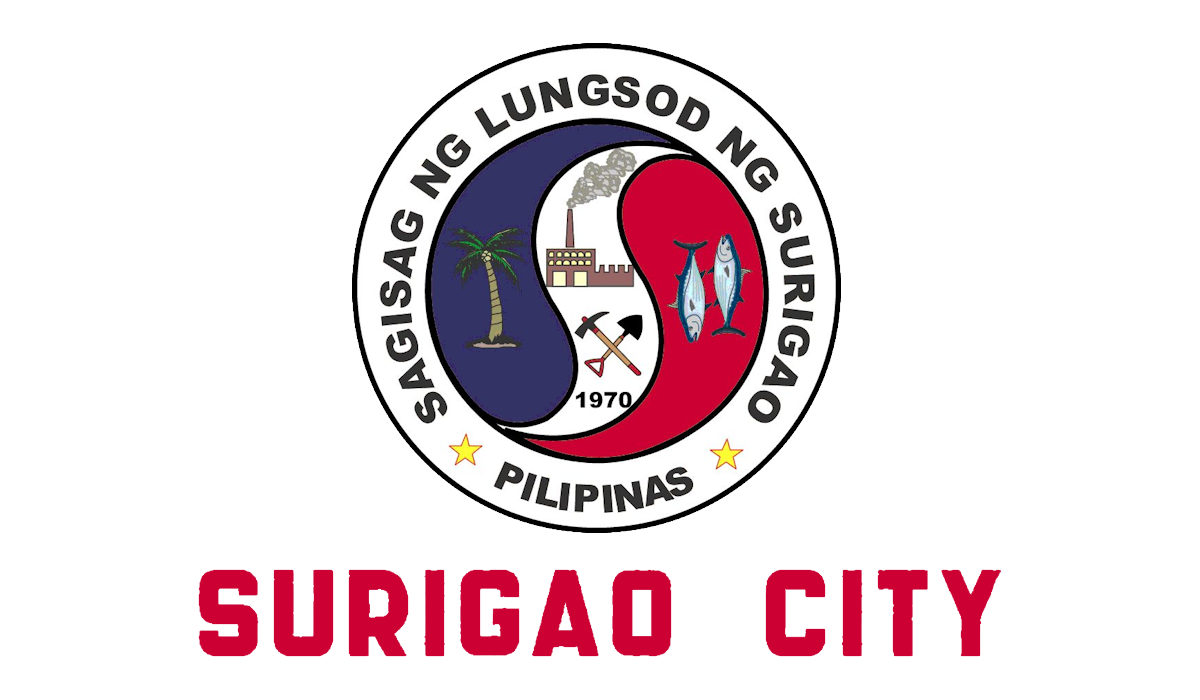
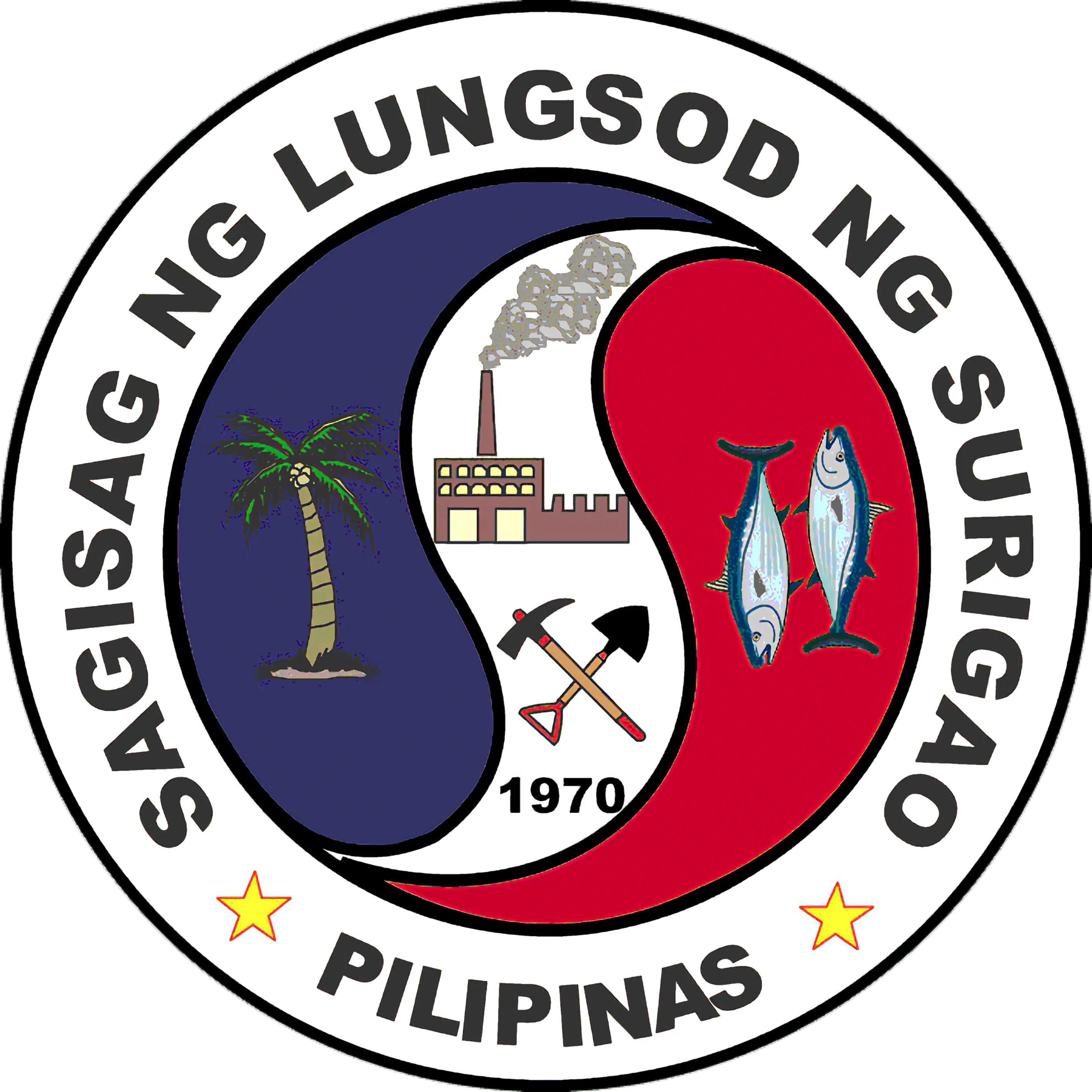
- Flag Seal
- Nickname: City of Island Adventures
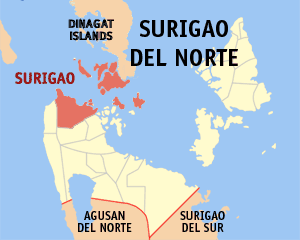
- Map of Surigao del Norte with Surigao City highlighted
- Interactive map of Surigao City
- Location within the Philippines
- Coordinates: 9°47′23″N 125°29′45″E
- Country: Philippines
- Region: Caraga
- Province: Surigao del Norte
- District: 2nd district
- Founded: June 29, 1655
- Cityhood: August 31, 1970
- Barangays: 54 (see Barangays)

Government
  - Type: Sangguniang Panlungsod
  - Mayor: Pablo Yves Lequit Dumlao II
  - Vice Mayor: Alfonso S. Casurra
  - Representative: Bernadette Barbers
  - City Council: Members: Sebastian Ric A. Nagas; Cazel R. Azarcon; Leonilo A. Aldonza; Karl Duane A. Casurra; Joel E. Tinio; Joshua Emilio S. Geli; Baltazar C. Abian; Noel Christian G. Catre Jr.; Jose Expeditus B. Bayana; Joseph Joey S. Yuipco
  - Electorate: 108,124 voters (2025)

Area
  - Total: 245.30 km^{2} (94.71 sq mi)
- Elevation: 43 m (141 ft)
- Highest elevation: 984 m (3,228 ft)
- Lowest elevation: 0 m (0 ft)

Population (2024 census)
  - Total: 177,333
  - Density: 984/km^{2} (2,550/sq mi)
  - Households: 41,816

Economy
  - Income class: 2nd city income class
  - Poverty incidence: 8.54% (2023)
  - Revenue: ₱ 1,363 million (2024)
  - Assets: ₱ 3,966 million (2024)
  - Expenditure: ₱ 1,229 million (2024)
  - Liabilities: ₱ 610.5 million (2024)

Service provider
  - Electricity: Surigao del Norte Electric Cooperative (SURNECO)
- Time zone: UTC+08:00 (PST)
- ZIP code: 8400
- PSGC: 166724000
- IDD : area code: +63 (0)86
- Native languages: Surigaonon; Agusan; Cebuano; Tagalog

Surigao City, officially the City of Surigao (Surigaonon: Siyudad nan Surigao; Cebuano: Dakbayan sa Surigao; Filipino: Lungsod ng Surigao), is a component city and capital of the province of Surigao del Norte, Philippines. It is the most populous settlement in the province with a population of 177,333 people according to the 2024 census.

The city is located at the north-easternmost tip of Mindanao with a total land area of 245.34 km^{2}.

Surigao City serves as a jump-off point to visitors of nearby Siargao, Dinagat and Bucas Grande islands. It is Mindanao's closest landmass to Visayas, separating the two island groups by eleven nautical miles across Surigao Strait.

== Etymology ==
Many linguists hypothesized differing origins of the name "Surigao". If the root word was taken to be sulig ("sprout" or "spring up"), then Surigao may have derived from suligao ("spring water"), likely referring to the Surigao River (known as "Suligaw" in Mandaya) that empties at the northern tip of the island of Mindanao. Early historical accounts record the name of the river as Suligao, Surigao, or Zurigan.

Historians also theorized "Surigao" is derived from Visayan surogao or suyogao, meaning "water current". From suyog (also sulog or surog), "current". Other Visayan words derived from the same root include Sinulog, Sulu and Tausug (Suluk).

The town was renamed Caraga after its founding, derived from the word calagan, from the Kalagan people, whose name means "people of the [fierce/brave] spirit". The Italian adventurer Giovanni Francesco Gemelli Careri, who published a book of travel in the country, cited Francisco Combes, S.J. as a source in saying that Calagan is derived from the two Visayan words, kalag for soul and an for people. Today, Caraga is the official name referring to the entire Region XIII, created through Republic Act No. 7901 on February 25, 1995, making it the newest region in the Philippines.

== History ==
The site around Surigao was settled early on, even before the Spanish conquest. Fishing villages dotted along the coast facing the Hinatuan Passage while Mamanwa tribes inhabited the interior highlands. The confluence of three major bodies of water- Pacific Ocean, Surigao Strait and Mindanao Sea made Surigao a strategic location, although its historical importance waxed and waned as other parts of the archipelago were explored and developed. Surigao was then a territory of the precolonial kingdom of Butuan. Surigao was region where the precolonial settlements of Butuan, such as the settlements of Anao-aon and Bilang-Bilang, were located at, as they supplied the kingdom with timber, seafood, and salt, in exchange for the gold that was produced in the capital.

=== Spanish era ===
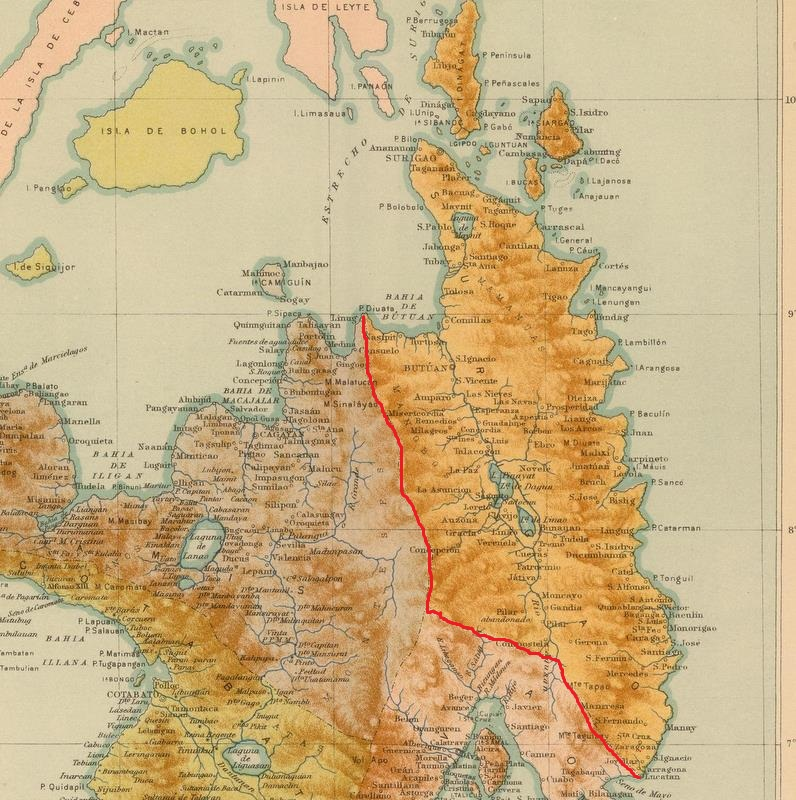
Surigao Province 1898

Ferdinand Magellan sailed into the Philippine Archipelago, reaching the island of Homonhon in an epic voyage of discovery and eventual circumnavigation of the world in 1521. Magellan's fleet proceeded to Limasawa through Surigao Strait, a notch north-west of the city's pelagic boundaries, before dropping anchor on the waters off the island of Cebu, ushering the Spanish colonization of the Philippines.

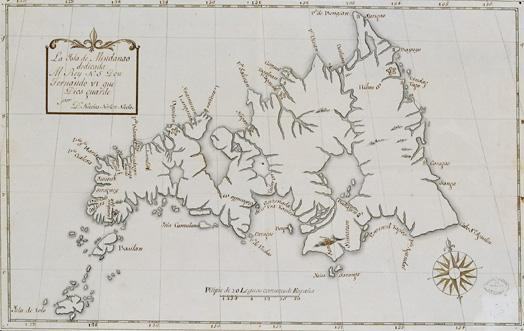
Surigao town as shown on a historical Mindanao map

Present day Surigao originated from a site in the city proper formerly known as Bilang-Bilang where it served as a port of call for inter-island vessels. It was renamed Banahao which became an integral part of the old district of Caraga, a town founded on June 29, 1655. After Caolo, present day Siargao, burned in 1750, Surigao became the capital of the expansive geopolitical, ecclesiastical and military district of Surigao which reached the northern parts of today's Davao and would include today's provinces of Surigao del Sur, Agusan del Norte, Agusan del Sur, parts of Davao de Oro, Misamis Oriental, Davao del Norte and Davao Oriental. It officially became the permanent residence of the Augustinian Recollects on February 1, 1752, when all the canonical books were moved from Caolo to Surigao. The first canonical books bore the signature of Fr. Lucas de la Cruz. Previously, the place was just a "vista" of the parish in Caolo. Its strategic location and new status as the seat of government was costly. Surigao witnessed violent territorial struggles as it suffered ultimately from relentless Moro raids. In 1752, the town was devastated. Most of its 2,000 inhabitants were either killed or taken as slaves by the Moros. In the 1818 census Surigao had 2,475 native families as well as 25 Spanish families from Spain.

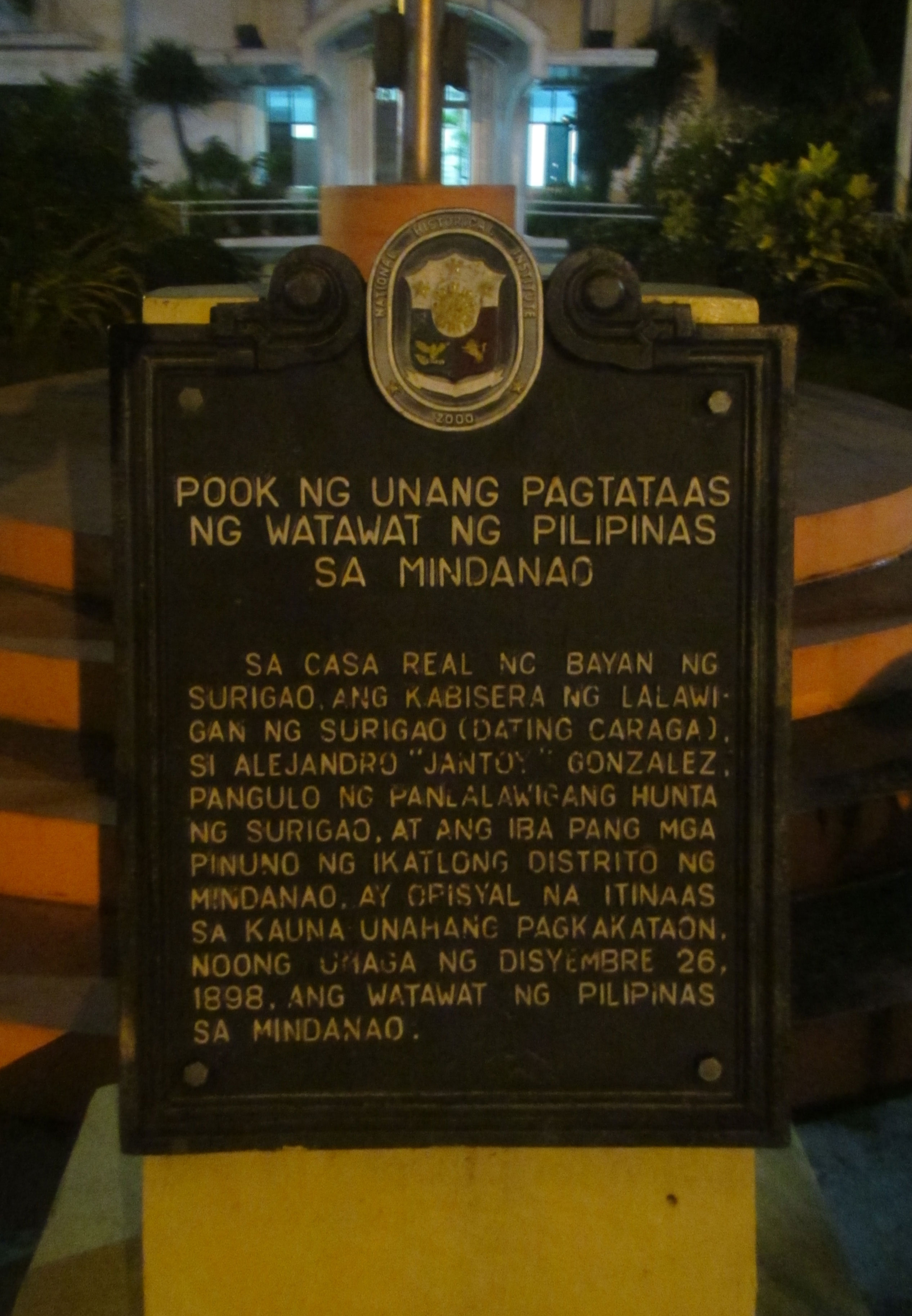
Historical marker of the first flag-raising of the modern Philippine flag in Mindanao

First and Official Flag Raising in Mindanao. Father Alberto Masoliver, S.J., during his stint as the parish priest of Surigao in 1898, kept a compilation of his diaries, entitled Diario de la Casa de Surigao. His diaries are currently stored in the Jesuit archives at Centro Borja, Sant Cugat del Valles, Spain. He thus wrote on December 26, 1898, "Before 10:00 AM, the tri-color was hoisted from Casa Real seat of provincial government) and the Tribunal … without any formalities … without anybody's attention being drawn…..these people have no idea of what it is all about, and if they have… how peaceful and without malice they are.". Surigao then was the cabecera and the seat of government of the province of Caraga which had jurisdiction over Surigao, Butuan and Cagayan de Misamis (Cagayan de Oro). Alejandro (Jantoy) Gonzalez was the president of the Junta Provincial of Surigao during the time of the first flag hoisting.

- Controversy about the location of the First Philippine Flag Raising in Mindanao. The Philippines' National Historical Institute carries the mandate to decide on historical matters and to erect national markers. In a roundtable held in January 2000, the historians decided that the raising of the flag on December 26, 1898, by Alejandro Gonzalez in Surigao was duly sanctioned by Emilio Aguinaldo's government. The installation of the NHI marker in Surigao City followed suit.

=== American period ===
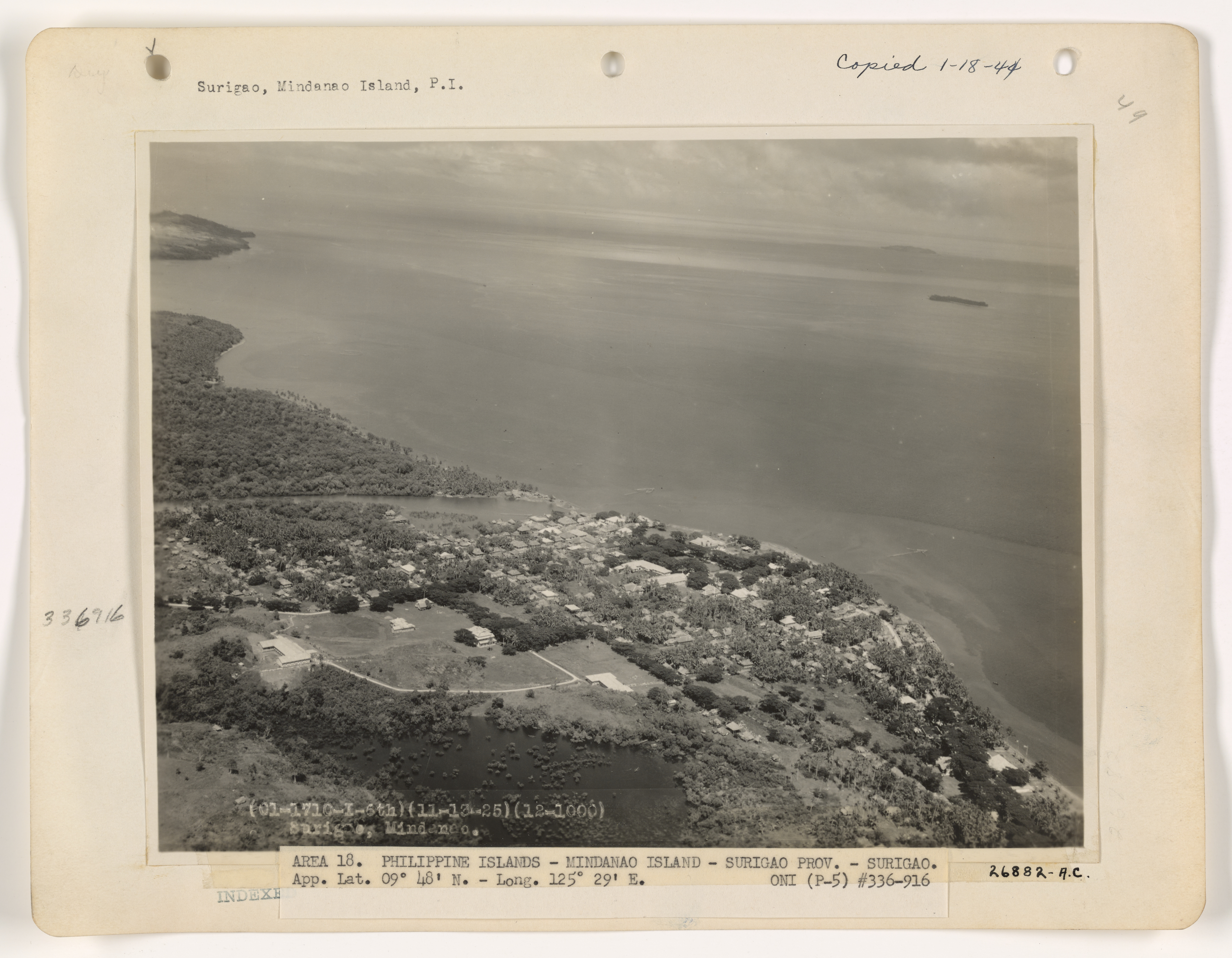
Aerial view of Surigao, circa 1936

At the turn of the century in 1901, the Americans established a civil government in the province of Surigao, keeping the town of Surigao as its capital. Surigao was then among the largest municipalities in land area with a jurisdiction of 949.90 square kilometers, larger than today's Butuan. During this period, there was only one main road, the Old Spanish road. The commercial district, market and plaza (Luneta) were all situated in one small area. In 1930, the Old Spanish road was abandoned and a new provincial road was constructed. The Casa Real was built where municipal administrators would hold their official functions. Surigao's core barrios- Taft and Washington, were named after United States presidents William Howard Taft and George Washington.

=== World War II ===
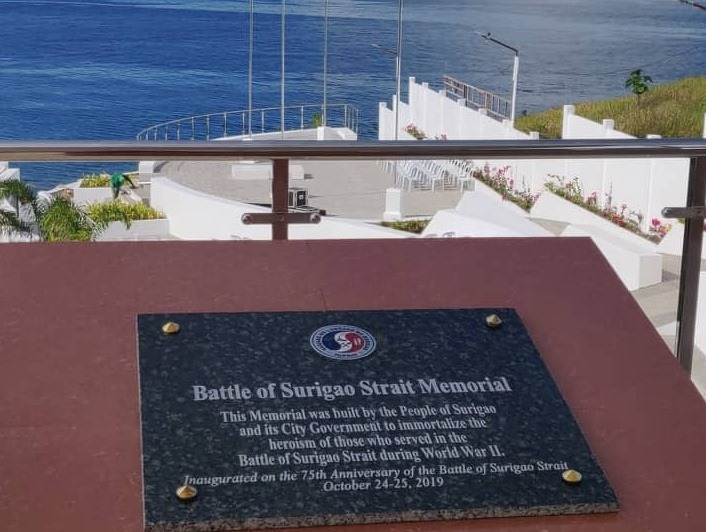
Battle of Surigao Strait Memorial

Surigao featured prominently in World War II's Pacific theater. On May 23, 1942, the Japanese Imperial Army under Colonel Yoshie occupied Surigao after arriving from Butuan. They formally took over on May 28, under Lieutenant Ichichara, taking control from Mayor Amat. Filipino guerrilla units based in Surigao continued to operate in the hinterlands. Liberation from the Japanese rule dawned on September 9, 1944. American planes started their campaign by bombing the town in the early morning. It was followed by a strafing of all Japanese warships docked at the Surigao wharf, which came to transport fresh troops and supplies to their forces in Leyte. No fewer than fifty warships were sunk by the raiding American bomber planes. After the attack, not a single Japanese ship was seen afloat. The following month, on October 24–25, the famous Battle of Surigao Strait, the final line battle in naval history, was fiercely fought by allied forces against the Japanese fleet. By April 12, 1945, the whole province of Surigao was liberated from Japanese occupation.

One American family who had lived in and near Surigao before the war returned after the Japanese left the area in 1945. Virginia Holmes, a child in 1945, many years later wrote, "We were shocked at the destruction the war years had wrought. Many houses stood empty, and others were mere skeletons. Walls were pockmarked with bullet holes. There were piles of rubble everywhere. The tree-lined streets that used to be so pretty were now full of potholes, and only a few trees were left undamaged." Holmes said the cemetery had been neglected and at least part of it was overgrown in weeds.

=== Post-war reconstruction ===
Massive reconstruction followed the destruction brought by the war. The Surigao Provincial Capitol was completed in 1946 atop the hill overlooking the city. Other facilities were built including schools, athletic field and municipal jail. In 1948, the first election of municipal officials was held. In the same year, construction of the Surigao Provincial Hospital commenced. Six years later in 1954, construction of the first municipal building started and was completed in 1955. Economic activities continued to flourish with the launching of gold mining operations by Mindanao Mother Lode Mines in Mabuhay, 10 kilometers from the city. Rapid economic growth and immigration lead to losing some of its fishing and agricultural barrios as they were converted into towns of Malimono (July 31, 1956), Anao-aon (San Francisco) (May 24, 1957) and Sison (September 15, 1959). During the same year, settlements including Capalayan, Libuac, Catadman, Mat-i, Lipata, Dakung Patag, Bunyasan, Cantapoy, Balite, and Bambanon were elevated into barrios, the forerunner of modern-day barangays. At that time, Surigao was classified as a 1st Class B municipality with an annual income of P160,000.00 and a population of nearly 50,000. It was primarily an agricultural town producing mainly copra and basic staples including rice, corn, bananas and rootcrops. Fishing was also a major source of livelihood. On September 18, 1960, pursuant to the Republic Act 2786 dated June 19, 1960, the province of Surigao was divided into Surigao del Norte and Surigao del Sur. The town of Surigao remained as a capital, this time for the province of Surigao del Norte.

Surigao was on a rapid growth path despite the provincial split. Already, it had a domestic airport, three movie houses, three hotels and two hospitals. On November 19, 1964, the town was on the direct path of supertyphoon Ining (internationally code-named Louise), with peak winds at 240 kilometers per hour, considered among the strongest in the city's recorded history. The city sustained extensive destruction to property and high human casualties. In 1967, Pacific Cement Corporation started commercial operations in Mabuhay, Sison, producing top quality cement in the country. In 1969, Marinduque Mining Industrial Corporation, a Canadian company subsidiary, started commercial operations and export of vast nickel ore deposits in Nonoc Island, with an initial capitalization of Php1.0 billion pesos, ushering a new era of prosperity.

=== Cityhood ===
Pursuant to Republic Act No. 6134, Surigao was converted to a chartered city on August 31, 1970, with Pedro Espina as its first city mayor.

== Geography ==
Surigao City is situated at the north-easternmost tip of Mindanao Island. It is bounded by Municipalities of Dinagat and Basilisa to the north, Philippine Sea and the Municipality of Cagdianao to the east, Municipalities of Sison and Tagana-an to the south, Mindanao Sea and the Municipality of San Francisco to the west and the Surigao Strait to the north-west.

=== Topography ===
Surigao City's rolling hills gently buffers its eastern and northwestern boundaries. To the south-west, the Kabangkaan Ridge separates the city from the municipality of San Francisco (formerly Anao-aon). Kinabutan River (otherwise known as Surigao River) meanders through Surigao Valley before emptying to the Surigao tidal basin, a mangrove and nipa palm marsh rapidly shrinking due to urban expansion and human encroachment.

The city has an average elevation of 19 meters or 65.5 feet above sea level. Kabangkaan Ridge, with a peak elevation of 465 meters above sea level, is the highest point. To the east along the border with Tagana-an, Mapawa Peak, with an elevation of 245 meters above sea level, rises above barangays Cabongbongan, Nabago and Capalayan.

More than two dozen islands and islets make up two fifths of the city's total land area. They are separated from the mainland by Hinatuan Passage, which connects Mindanao Sea to the Pacific Ocean. Nonoc, the largest island, is typically hilly, with its highest elevation at 263 meters above sea level, and can easily be identified through its bare rusty-red weathering mantle of lateritic nickel ore. Hikdop Island, directly across the city proper, is known for the undersea Buenavista cave, with Mount Telegrapo, its highest point at 100.05 meters. Hinatuan Island, has been mined extensively during the later part of the last century, and straddles across Siargao Island. Other notable islands like Hanigad, Sibale, Bayaganan, Sumilon, Danawan, and Awasan are generally flat, and primarily covered with coconut palm trees. Large swaths of mangrove and nipa palm forests are familiar sights around the city's islands and coastal waterways.

=== Climate ===
Climate data for Surigao City (1991–2020, extremes 1903–2023)
Month	Jan	Feb	Mar	Apr	May	Jun	Jul	Aug	Sep	Oct	Nov	Dec	Year
Record high °C (°F)	33.7 (92.7)	33.5 (92.3)	35.0 (95.0)	35.2 (95.4)	36.3 (97.3)	37.5 (99.5)	36.2 (97.2)	37.0 (98.6)	38.2 (100.8)	35.6 (96.1)	36.5 (97.7)	34.6 (94.3)	37.5 (99.5)
Mean daily maximum °C (°F)	29.4 (84.9)	30.0 (86.0)	30.9 (87.6)	31.9 (89.4)	32.8 (91.0)	32.6 (90.7)	32.4 (90.3)	32.8 (91.0)	32.7 (90.9)	32.0 (89.6)	31.0 (87.8)	30.2 (86.4)	31.6 (88.9)
Daily mean °C (°F)	26.3 (79.3)	26.6 (79.9)	27.3 (81.1)	28.1 (82.6)	28.9 (84.0)	28.6 (83.5)	28.5 (83.3)	28.8 (83.8)	28.6 (83.5)	28.2 (82.8)	27.5 (81.5)	26.9 (80.4)	27.8 (82.0)
Mean daily minimum °C (°F)	23.1 (73.6)	23.3 (73.9)	23.7 (74.7)	24.3 (75.7)	24.9 (76.8)	24.7 (76.5)	24.6 (76.3)	24.7 (76.5)	24.6 (76.3)	24.4 (75.9)	24.0 (75.2)	23.6 (74.5)	24.1 (75.4)
Record low °C (°F)	18.6 (65.5)	18.2 (64.8)	18.8 (65.8)	18.9 (66.0)	20.8 (69.4)	20.7 (69.3)	18.0 (64.4)	20.0 (68.0)	20.6 (69.1)	20.0 (68.0)	19.4 (66.9)	19.1 (66.4)	18.2 (64.8)
Average rainfall mm (inches)	661.5 (26.04)	468.1 (18.43)	354.8 (13.97)	210.5 (8.29)	120.0 (4.72)	158.3 (6.23)	158.4 (6.24)	142.9 (5.63)	181.0 (7.13)	250.3 (9.85)	454.2 (17.88)	597.3 (23.52)	3,757.3 (147.93)
Average rainy days (≥ 1 mm)	24	19	19	15	10	12	12	10	11	16	21	23	192
Average relative humidity (%)	88	86	84	83	81	81	81	80	81	83	86	87	83
Source: PAGASA

Surigao has a tropical rainforest climate type, Köppen class Af with an average monthly precipitation of 308.66 mm (12.5 inches). It is distinctly wettest between the months of November until March. During the drier season between April and September, brief afternoon showers and thunderstorms locally called sobasco, are commonplace.

=== Barangays ===
Surigao City is politically subdivided into 54 barangays. Each barangay consists of puroks while some have sitios.

There are 33 barangas which located in the mainland and 21 barangays in the islands. Of the 36 coastal barangays, 15 are in the mainland and 20 are in the islands. The urban area covers 15 barangays or approximately 20% of the total land area. These include Taft, Washington, San Juan, Sabang, Canlanipa, Cagniog, Luna, Togbongon, Rizal, Lipata, Punta Bilar, Mabua and Ipil.

The 21 island barangays are Alang-Alang, Alegria, Aurora, Baybay, Bilabid, Bitaugan, Buenavista, Cagutsan, Cantiasay, Catadman, Danawan, Libuac, Lisondra, Manjagao, Nonoc, San Jose, San Pedro, Sidlakan, Sugbay, Talisay, and Zaragoza.

- Alang-alang
- Alegria
- Anomar
- Aurora
- Balibayon
- Baybay
- Bilabid
- Bitaugan
- Bonifacio
- Buenavista
- Cabongbongan
- Cagniog
- Cagutsan
- Canlanipa
- Cantiasay
- Capalayan
- Catadman
- Danao
- Danawan
- Day-asan
- Ipil
- Libuac
- Lipata
- Lisondra
- Luna
- Mabini
- Mabua
- Manjagao
- Mapawa
- Mat-i
- Nabago
- Nonoc
- Orok
- Poctoy
- Punta Bilar
- Quezon
- Rizal
- Sabang
- San Isidro
- San Jose
- San Juan
- San Pedro (Hanigad)
- San Roque
- Serna (Bad-asay)
- Sidlakan
- Silop
- Sugbay
- Sukailang
- Taft (Poblacion)
- Talisay
- Togbongon
- Trinidad
- Washington (Poblacion)
- Zaragoza

== Demographics ==
Population census of Surigao City

Year	Pop.	±% p.a.
1903	8,606	—
1918	16,232	+4.32%
1939	34,339	+3.63%
1948	46,109	+3.33%
1960	37,439	−1.72%
1970	51,496	+3.24%

Year	Pop.	±% p.a.
1975	66,027	+5.11%
1980	79,745	+3.85%
1990	100,379	+2.33%
1995	104,909	+0.83%
2000	118,534	+2.65%
2007	132,151	+1.51%

Year	Pop.	±% p.a.
2010	140,540	+2.27%
2015	154,137	+1.77%
2020	171,107	+2.22%
2024	177,333	+0.86%

Source: Philippine Statistics Authority

The demographics of Surigao City are evidence of an ethnically diverse city. Throughout its history, Surigao has been a point of entry for migrants from other regions of the Philippines, enticed by the city's political significance, attractive natural setting, abundant resources and during the last century, increased mining operations. Butuanons, Hiligaynons, Warays, Cebuanos, Boholanos and other ethnic groups found home in Surigao and eventually learned how to speak the language, though Cebuano is also spoken and understood language in the city as a secondary language. Some of their descendants now hold prominent positions in the city and provincial governments. Immigrants from China and India also found home in Surigao; their direct descendants now comprise the bulk of successful merchants of the Surigao business community.

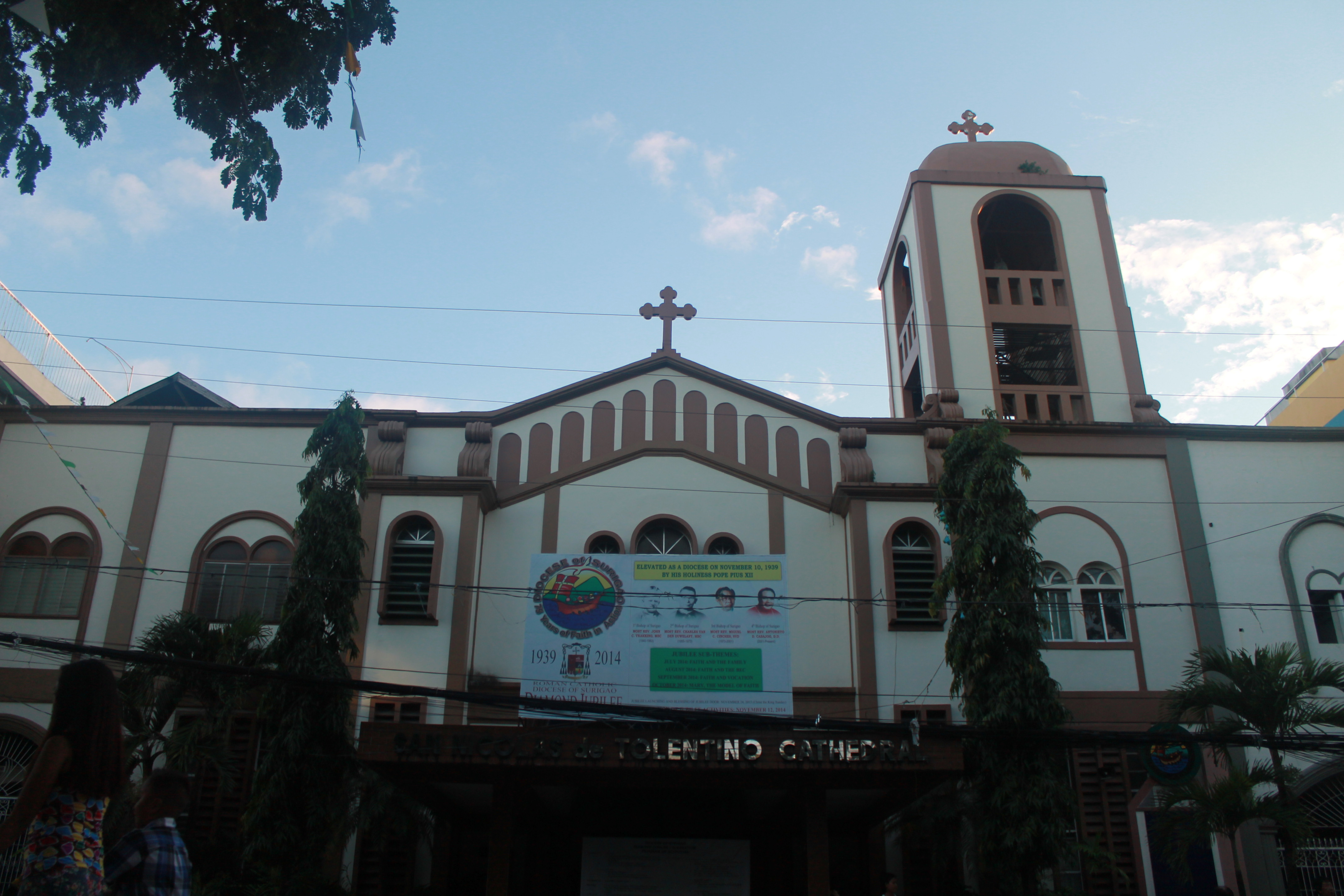
The Cathedral of San Nicolas de Tolentino at San Nicolas Street, Brgy. Washington.

Surigao is home to one of the country's oldest and most colorful tribes, the Mamanwa. They are similar to the Negritoes of Luzon in features and stature. They are generally short, dark-skinned, with a crop of short kinky hair. Their nomadic existence forced them to settle in less desirable hinterland areas as development encroached on their traditional gathering and hunting grounds.

Mamanwas thrived wherever they went as they practiced their unique customs and traditions. The faith about Kahimunan, one of their many tribal festivities, highlights music and graceful dancing. Revelers chant and play while accompanied by native musical instruments, including the gimbar (drum), gong, and bamboo percussion called kalatong and katik. Wild pigs, chicken, indigenous fruits, and rare kayape fruit are among the offerings. A baylan (priest) presides over the celebration as a tribute and invocation to their god Magbabaya and departed ancestors for good health and abundant harvest.

Mamanwas are also known for their creative patterns, brass jewelry, and indigenous crafts, displayed proudly on their costumes as they fill the streets at the height of the Bonok Bonok Maradjao Karadjao Festival every September 9, celebrated on the occasion of the feast of Saint Nicolas de Tolentino, Surigao City's patron saint. Bonok-bonok and its prehistoric origins were rituals to thank their gods, presided by various village chieftains and their wives. Happiness and friendship are expressed through dancing, chanting, and singing. They wave scarves of banay as symbols of goodwill, wealth, and blessings for all tribal villages.

Today, some Mamanwas have acquired typical trappings of society, as they live in permanent communities, subsist on backyard farming, and occasionally descend to town to sell or barter handicrafts and fresh harvest. Bands still subsist on foraging, even as most have adopted a more modern way of life over the years.

=== Barangays ===
Barangay	Population Percentage	Population (2020)	Population (2015)	Change (2015-2020)	Annual Population Growth Rate (2015-2020)
Alang-alang	0.25%	436	405	7.65%	1.56%
Alegria	0.36%	623	574	8.54%	1.74%
Anomar	1.12%	1,908	1,727	10.48%	2.12%
Aurora	0.43%	736	677	8.71%	1.77%
Balibayon	1.30%	2,216	1,752	26.48%	5.07%
Baybay	0.18%	311	330	-5.76%	-1.24%
Bilabid	0.14%	241	293	-17.75%	-4.03%
Bitaugan	0.41%	707	637	10.99%	2.22%
Bonifacio	2.23%	3,822	3,534	8.15%	1.66%
Buenavista	0.68%	1,168	916	27.51%	5.25%
Cabongbongan	0.49%	841	905	-7.07%	-1.53%
Cagniog	3.87%	6,622	5,225	26.74%	5.11%
Cagutsan	0.20%	342	345	-0.87%	-0.18%
Canlanipa	6.80%	11,636	9,697	20.00%	3.91%
Cantiasay	0.61%	1,047	984	6.40%	1.31%
Capalayan	1.56%	2,672	2,502	6.79%	1.39%
Catadman	0.20%	350	382	-8.38%	-1.82%
Danao	0.39%	669	593	12.82%	2.57%
Danawan	0.36%	620	573	8.20%	1.67%
Day-asan	1.19%	2,032	1,883	7.91%	1.62%
Ipil	2.74%	4,692	4,323	8.54%	1.74%
Libuac	0.58%	997	949	5.06%	1.04%
Lipata	1.68%	2,872	2,653	8.25%	1.68%
Lisondra	0.50%	858	882	-2.72%	-0.58%
Luna	7.73%	13,233	10,425	26.94%	5.15%
Mabini	1.37%	2,347	2,337	0.43%	0.09%
Mabua	1.97%	3,363	2,778	21.06%	4.10%
Manyagao	0.56%	956	851	12.34%	2.48%
Mapawa	0.74%	1,270	1,132	12.19%	2.45%
Mat-i	3.87%	6,617	5,722	15.64%	3.11%
Nabago	0.68%	1,167	1,143	2.10%	0.44%
Nonoc	0.65%	1,107	1,310	-15.50%	-3.48%
Orok	0.80%	1,372	1,114	23.16%	4.48%
Poctoy	1.16%	1,991	1,688	17.95%	3.54%
Punta Bilar	0.80%	1,371	1,079	27.06%	5.17%
Quezon	1.37%	2,339	2,229	4.93%	1.02%
Rizal	4.38%	7,492	6,659	12.51%	2.51%
Sabang	3.57%	6,114	4,705	29.95%	5.67%
San Isidro	0.37%	629	586	7.34%	1.50%
San Jose	0.79%	1,356	1,265	7.19%	1.47%
San Juan	9.68%	16,565	14,925	10.99%	2.22%
San Pedro	0.54%	919	865	6.24%	1.28%
San Roque	0.93%	1,596	1,444	10.53%	2.13%
Serna	0.99%	1,701	1,438	18.29%	3.60%
Sidlakan	0.19%	331	307	7.82%	1.60%
Silop	0.94%	1,602	1,485	7.88%	1.61%
Sugbay	0.32%	554	482	14.94%	2.97%
Sukailang	0.82%	1,396	1,386	0.72%	0.15%
Taft	11.25%	19,242	18,571	3.61%	0.75%
Talisay	0.68%	1,166	1,403	-16.89%	-3.82%
Togbongon	1.32%	2,257	2,105	7.22%	1.48%
Trinidad	1.59%	2,726	2,587	5.37%	1.11%
Washington	11.29%	19,319	18,900	2.22%	0.46%
Zaragoza	0.35%	591	475	24.42%	4.71%
Surigao City Total		171,107	154,137	11.01%	2.22%

=== Language ===
Surigaonon, the official language in the city and province, is unique among the Visayan languages. It is also spoken by the majority of the population in the province of Surigao del Sur and around Lake Mainit in Agusan del Norte. Similarities with the Cebuano language are undeniable, however, staunch Cebuano speakers can hardly understand people who speak Surigaonon. There is no doubt Surigaonon existed as pure and distinct, slowly pelted over time by Visayan words as migrants settled in the area. Today, Surigaonon is the most widely spoken language inherent in the eastern Caraga region.

Surigaonon has similar consonant and vowel sounds, stress, intonation patterns to the Cebuano language and Boholano dialect. Surigaonon underwent certain morphophonemic processes, such as assimilation, deletion, alternation and metathesis (Dumanig, 2005). In the study conducted by Dumanig (2005) on Descriptive Analysis of Surigaonon language it was found that there are 18 consonants (b, d, g, h, j, k, l, m, n, ng, p, r, s, t, w, y, o,?) with 18 sounds and 3 vowels (a, i, u) with 5 sounds. It has also 25 consonant clusters (br, bl, bw, by, dr, dy, dw, gr, gw, kr, kl, kw, mw, my, nw, pr, pl, pw, py, sw, sy, tr, tw, ty, hw) and 4 diphthongs (aw, ay, iw, uy), which are similar to the Cebuano language (Rubrico, 1999). There are Surigaonon words that are spelled similarly but they differ in meaning depending on how each syllable is stressed (Dumanig, 2005). Surigaonon language follows two intonation patterns like the rising and falling intonation. The rising intonation is common in asking yes or no questions and the falling intonation occurs in ending declarative and imperative statements (Dumanig, 2005)

== Economy ==
Surigao City underwent rapid economic growth that spanned nearly two decades beginning in the late 1960s. Pacific Cement (PACEMCO) started commercial operations manufacturing Portland cement and the Canadian-owned company Marinduque Mining and Industrial Corporation (MMIC) also started extracting nickel and iron ore in Nonoc Island. This was a boon to the city as it generated commerce to meet increasing demand for goods and services. Towards the late 1970s, Surigao attained first class status. The rest of the province also saw increased mining operations, primarily extracting gold and copper. The city became the nexus of mining activity in the entire Northern Mindanao (Region X), at the time among Philippines' largest regions encompassing nearly half of Mindanao Island. Philippines' Bureau of Mines and Geosciences moved its regional headquarters in the city at Km. 1.

Poverty incidence of Surigao City (%)

Source: Philippine Statistics Authority

In 1983, MMIC ceased commercial operations due to financial losses and heavy debt as a result of plummeting prices of nickel and high operating costs. Copra prices similarly fell and made copra processing unsustainable for the Surigao Coconut Development Corp. (SUCODECO) plant to stay open in Lipata. As though the closure of these two plants was not enough, typhoon Nitang (internationally codename Typhoon Ike) further damaged the economy, destroying seventy percent of the buildings and infrastructure when it struck Surigao in 1984. It took almost a decade for the city's economy to recover fully, as it relied on basic services, small-scale industries, agriculture and fishing.

At the turn of the 21st century, the city saw improvement of its key macroeconomic indicators, partly benefiting from the booming tourism in the province, primarily in Siargao, and the prospect of new large-scale mining investments in Claver.

=== Agriculture and Fishing ===
The city's primary agricultural produce includes rice, corn, vegetables, rootcrops, coconut, copra and bananas. It is a major supplier of fish and crustaceans; its exports reach buyers as far as Hong Kong, Japan and China. An integrated fishport is planned which includes functional facilities such as fish market, gear and commercial shops, administration building and fish container storage facilities.

=== Banking ===
As of 2022, multinational and national banks such as Asia United Bank, Banco de Oro (BDO), Bank of the Philippine Islands (BPI), Chinabank, Development Bank of the Philippines (DBP), EastWest Bank, Land Bank of the Philippines (formerly UCPB), Metrobank, Philippine National Bank (PNB), Rizal Commercial Banking Corporation (RCBC) and Security Bank, among other banks, maintain branches in the city. There are 47 finance cooperatives, 52 pawnshops and 51 money changers/foreign exchange dealers, remittance centers, microfinancing institutions and savings and loans associations that maintain business offices in the city.

=== Mining ===
In 2012, San Miguel Corporation won the rights to rehabilitate and operate the nickel mine in Nonoc Island for US$3 billion. The once bustling island, approximately 8 nautical miles from the city, has been identified as a special economic zone (Ecozone) by the national government, covering a 590- hectare area, to make use of existing island infrastructure, including a 1300-meter concrete airstrip and two 60,000 DWT seaport . The mining operations has been mothballed since 1986 due to the slumping prices of nickel at that time.

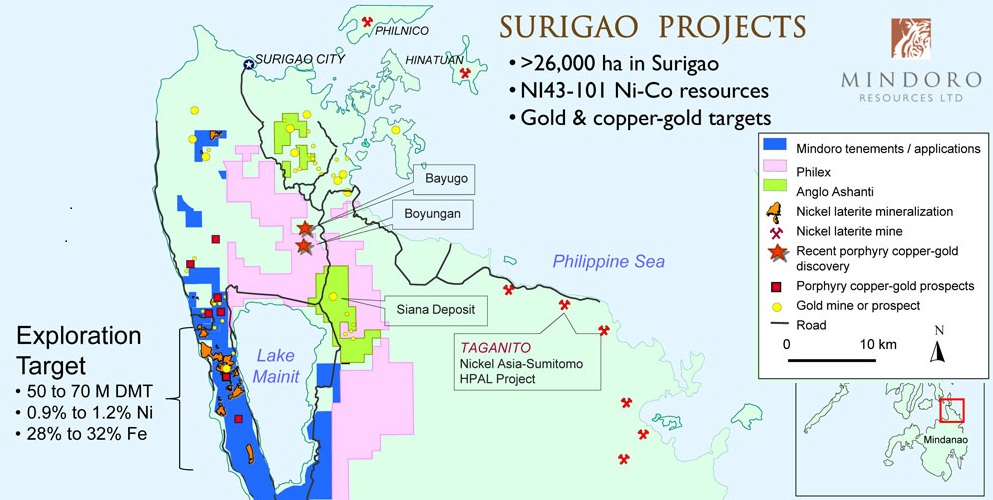
Surigao Mining Map 2011

Pacific Cement (PACEMCO), the only cement plant in the Caraga region, and now managed by San Miguel Corporation, is expected to resume mining operations in the city since it shutdown in 2014.

The entry of major international mining company Sumitomo with $1.3 billion investment in the province sparked renewed interest of its vast mineral reserves and has helped spur economic growth in the city. Other mining companies like Philex Mining Corporation, Mindoro Resources Ltd. and Anglo Ashanti are in various stages of exploration.

Since late 1960's, the city has been the de facto regional mining capital of the then Northern Mindanao region due to the massive mining investments in the province. Today, it is home to offices of various mining companies and the headquarters of the Bureau of Mines and Geosciences of Caraga region.

=== Retail ===
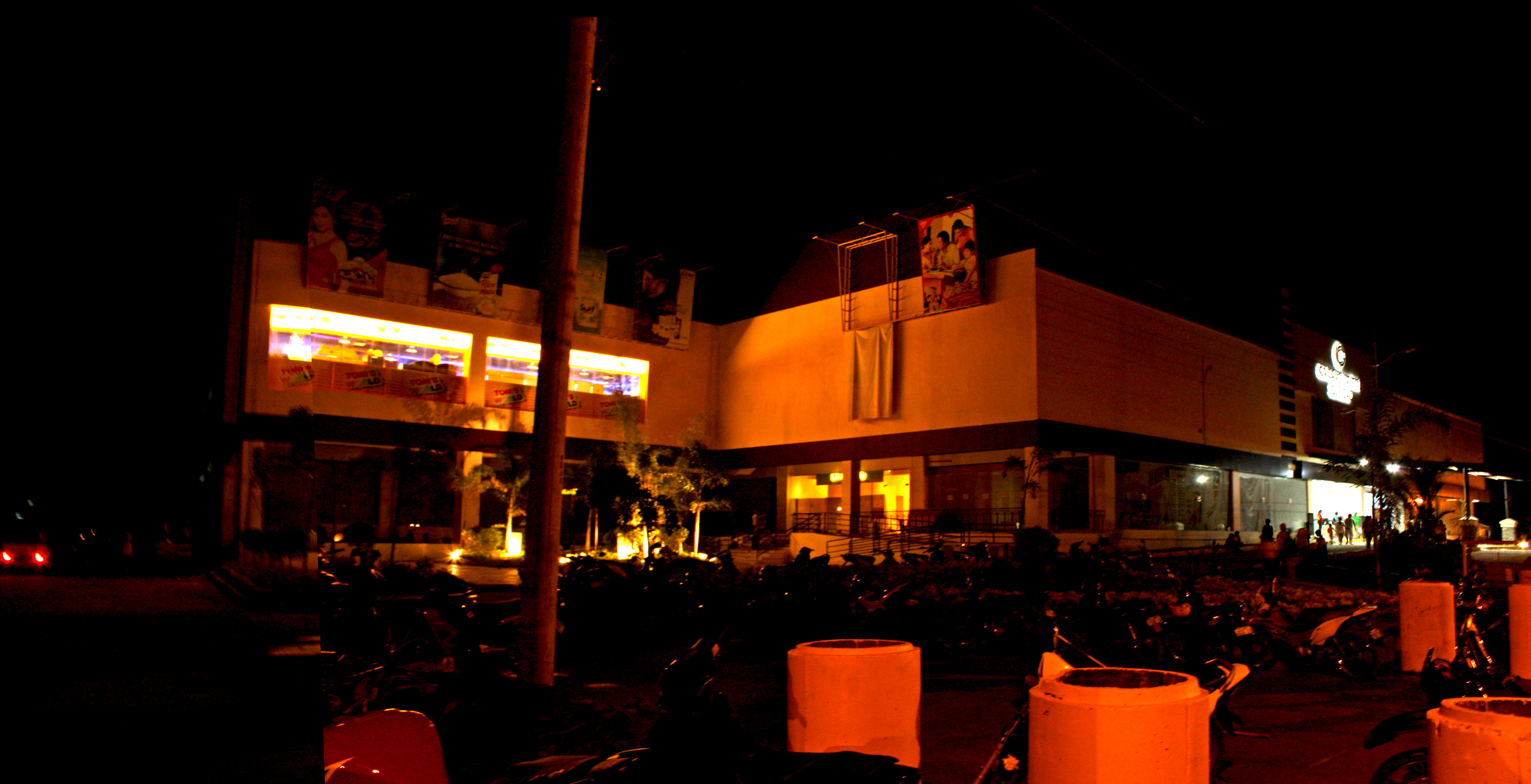
Gaisano Capital Surigao

During the last two decades, Surigao's retail activity expanded beyond its historical core near Luneta Park, transforming residential areas into newly built low rises. This rapid growth contributed to high cost of property rentals and limited space for expansion downtown. A new uptown shopping district is growing in Barangay Luna, spurred by the expansion of St. Paul University. Gaisano Capital Surigao Mall opened in December 2011, and ParkWay Mall opened during the last quarter of 2012. After years of stalled construction, CityMall opened in July 2023.

=== Tourism ===
Tourism figures showed 312,000 tourist arrivals in the city in 2019, registering a 27% growth. Newly built hotels and lodging facilities increased the city's guest rooms, with larger hotels now capable of hosting national and regional conventions.

==== Important city dates ====
- August 25–31: Charter Day Celebrations – Weeklong festivities marked by a sportsfest, grand parade, evening gala affairs and the crowning of Mutya ng Surigao in commemoration of the city's founding (charter) on August 31, 1970.
- September 9: Bonok-Bonok Maradjao Karadjao Festival – A day-long street dancing and festivities featuring the ethnic Mamanwa tribal dance, Bonok-bonok commemorating thanksgiving after a bountiful harvest, worship of gods and tribal weddings. Dance contingents from around the country showcase creative costumes, floats, dances and chants of Viva Señor San Nicolas! and Viva Maradjao Karajao!. The dance rhythm starts with a slow beat as it pulsatingly goes faster, prompting snappy body movements to pace with the music. Colorful ceremonial costumes includes an elaborate beaded headdress or tubaw, bracelets and anklets. Prices are awarded to outstanding contingents in various categories at the culmination of the event held at the Surigao Provincial Sports Complex. The festival is held on the eve of the city's annual fiesta.
- September 10: Surigao City fiesta.
- October 25: Battle Of Surigao Strait – Held every October 25, in commemoration of the last great battleship vs. battleship naval battle of World War II, highlighted by a pre-dawn memorial service, civil-military parade, and a memorial cruise along the Surigao Strait. Commemorating veterans, diplomats, consuls, and active naval personnel from the US, Australia, and Japan have been gracing the event over the past quarter century.
- December 26: Commemoration of the First Hoisting of Philippine Flag in Mindanao – The Philippine flag in Mindanao was first raised in Surigao in the morning of December 26, 1898, at the Casa Real (town hall). The event was recorded in the diary of Fr. Alberto Masoliver, now kept in the Jesuit Archives in Spain.

== Government ==
Surigao City is governed via the mayor-council system. The city council, nationally called Sangguniang Panlungsod, consists of the vice mayor and 12 council members. The mayor is elected directly every three years.

=== List of former and current city mayors ===
Term	Name	Notes
1970–1976	Pedro R. Espina	Served as mayor of the Municipality of Surigao from 1963 to 1970, and on August 31, 1970, he was elected as the First Mayor of Surigao City. Died in 19--?
1976–1986	Constantino Herrera Navarro Jr.	Appointed as City Mayor in 1976 and elected as City Mayor in the 1980 Philippine Local Elections. He was replaced after the EDSA Revolution. Died in 2014.
1986–1987	Enrique Y. Tandan	Appointed as acting Mayor after the EDSA Revolution in 1986. Died in 2010.
1988–1998	Salvador C. Sering	Elected in 1988
1998–1999	Roland Arreza Sering	Died in office.
1999–2010	Alfonso Servaña Casurra	Succeeded after the death of Roland Arreza Sering. Then elected to office.
2010–2019	Ernesto Tinio Matugas	Term Ended in 2019 and ran as Vice Mayor to his son Estong who ran for City Mayor
2019–2022	Ernesto "Estong" U. Matugas Jr.	Shortest term among elected city mayors (who did not die in office)
2022–	Paul Dumlao	Elected May 11, 2022

== Infrastructure ==
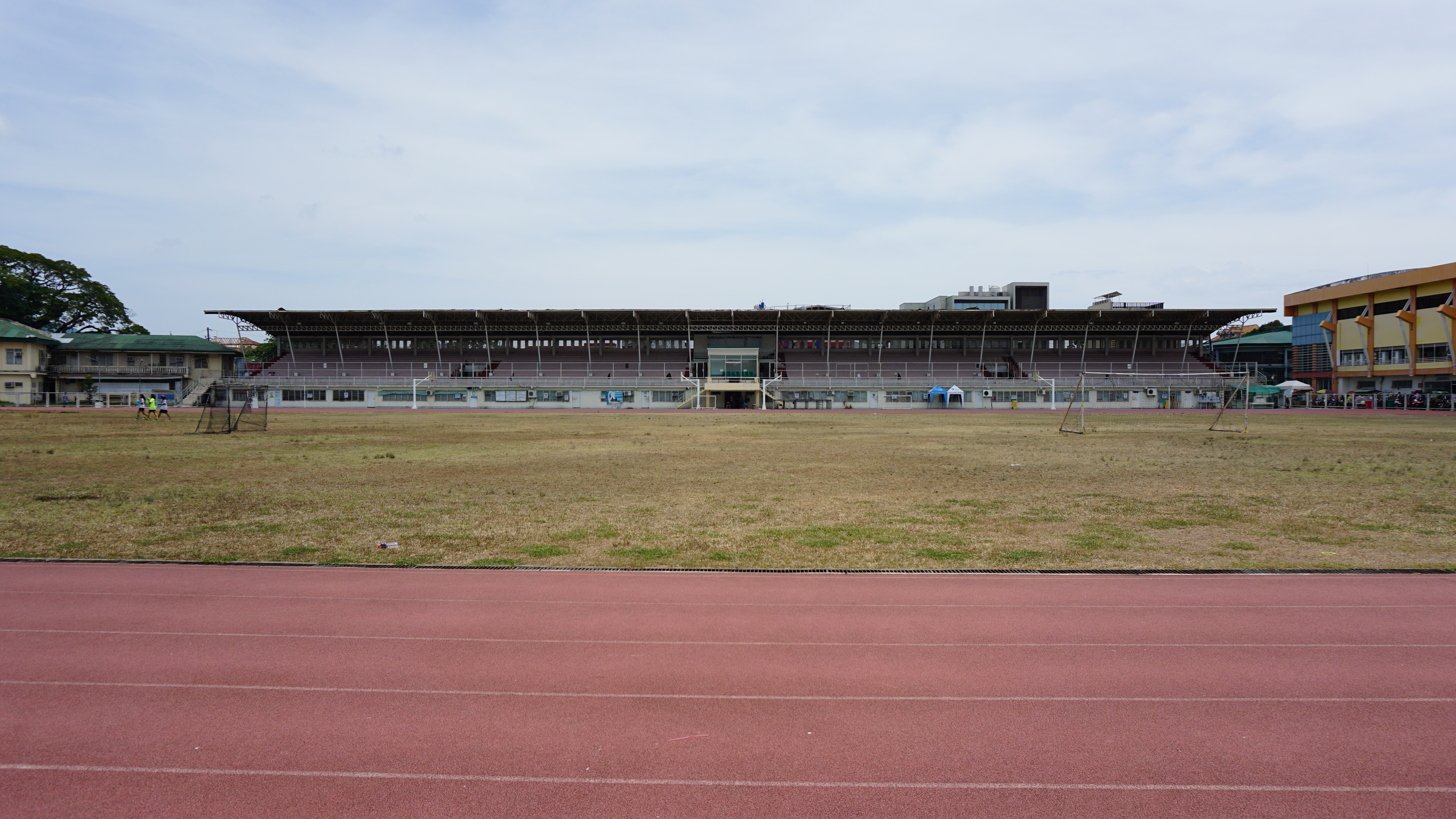
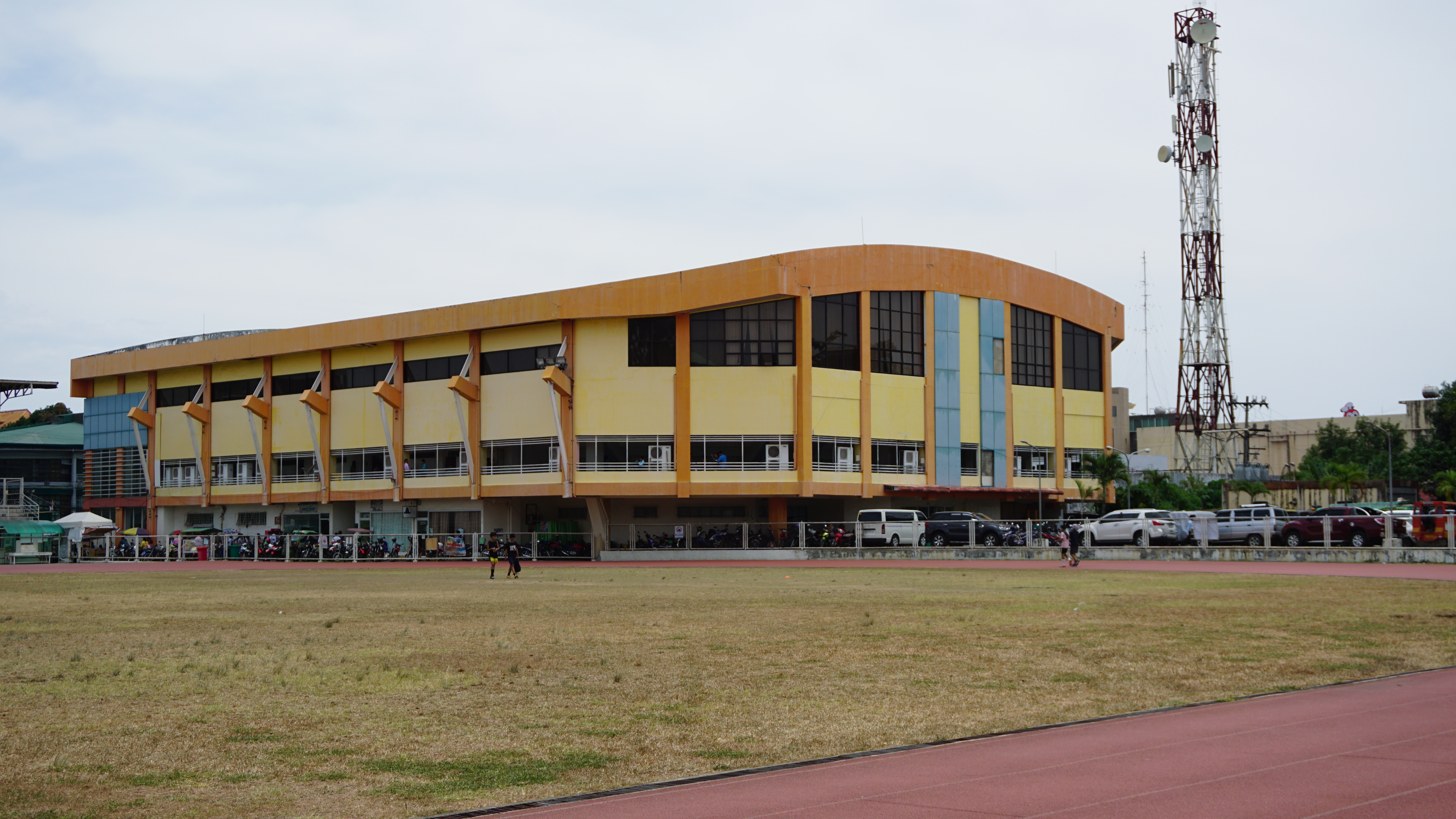
Surigao Provincial Sports Complex

Surigao Provincial Sports Complex Host to numerous national and regional events, the complex underwent renovation in 2009 at a cost of ₱320 million. It is situated on the 2-hectare Vasquez field and includes a 3,500-person capacity grandstand, a fully air conditioned 3,500 seating capacity gymnasium, a brand new amphitheater, an Olympic-size swimming pool (renovated in 2020 and again in 2025) and a fully rubberized track and field oval. Surigao Provincial Convention Center, also part of the complex, has a seating capacity of approximately 2,500 people.

Waste Management Facility Averaging a 21-ton daily collected garbage, the local government of Surigao built a sanitary landfill in Sitio Looc in 2009 under a ₱150 million grant from the Swedish government and assistance from the Land Bank of the Philippines. It is considered a model for solid waste management which includes a ₱P45 million-worth waste treatment facility, a material recovery facility which treats recyclables and a leachate collector, which extracts and treats liquids from garbage.

=== Transportation ===
Motorized tricycles, an indigenous form of auto- rickshaw that can accommodate about six passengers, is mainly the mode of transport in the city. Buses and jeepneys follow fixed routes to outlying barangays, towns and neighboring provinces. The city is also served by outrigger water taxis called pump boats that follow scheduled sea routes to island barangays. Larger vessels called Lantsa have scheduled trips to Siargao, Dinagat and Bucas Grande. Regular ferry service connects the city to ports in Southern Leyte, Cebu, Manila and Agusan del Norte. There are direct flights to Manila and Cebu originating from the city's airport with occasional chartered flights to Siargao, Butuan and Tandag.

The city is the northernmost terminus of the Pan-Philippine Highway (AH26) in Mindanao. Buses from its integrated Land Transport Terminal provide direct trips to Ormoc, Tacloban, Legazpi, Manila, Butuan, Tandag, Davao and Bislig (Mangagoy). Among the bus companies serving this terminal includes Bachelor Express, Philtranco, Davao Metro Shuttle, PP Bus Line and Surigao Express.

Completed in 2007, the San Juan-Lipata Coastal Road connects the Port of Lipata to downtown Surigao, cutting travel time in half. It includes a series of bridges across barangays San Juan and Sabang, including Banahaw bridge, which spans the Surigao tidal basin.

A new diversion road, connecting Sabang to National Highway AH26, will help decongest the main access to the city once completed, although it remained unfinished indefinitely.

=== Ports ===
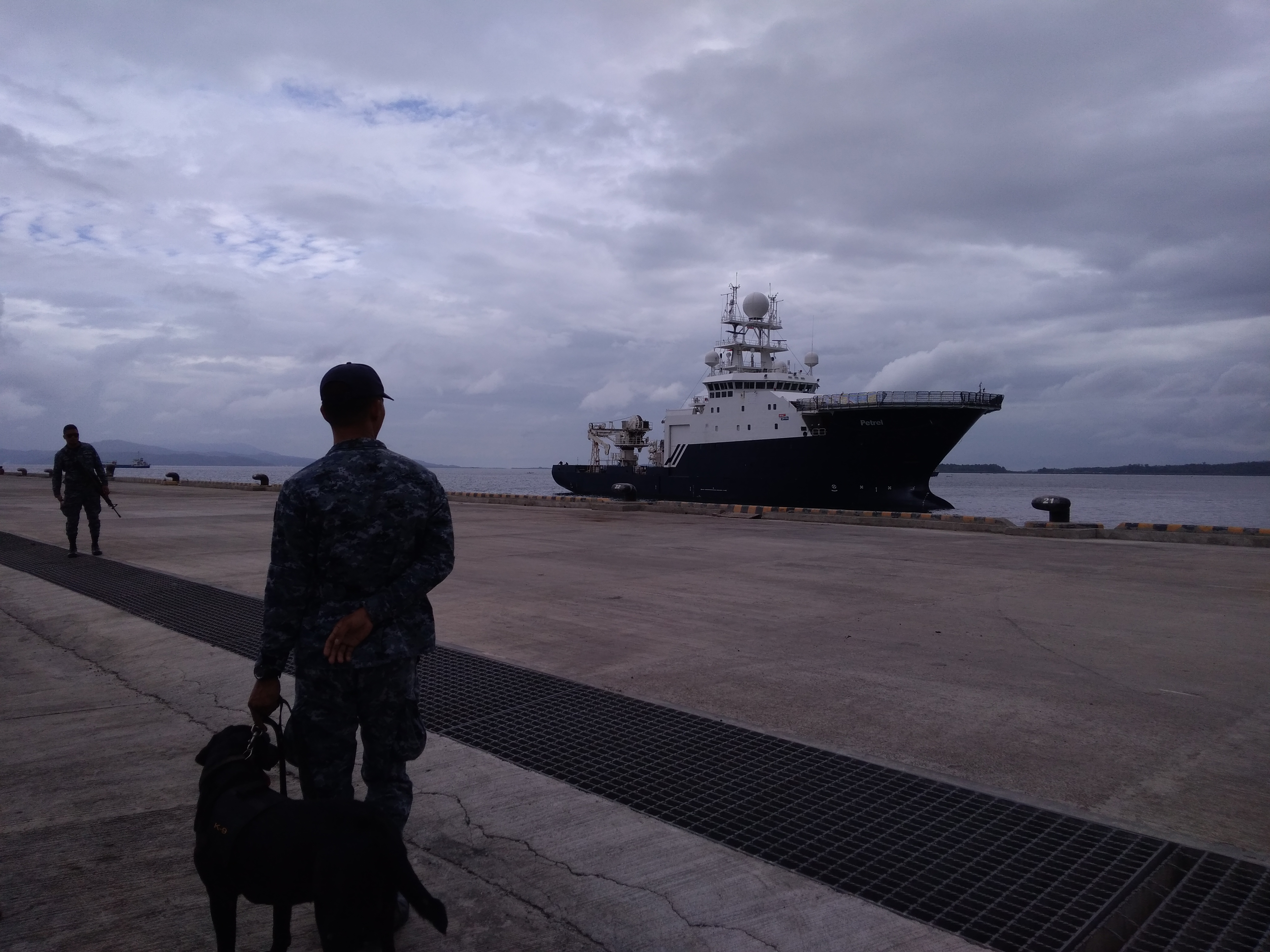
Port of Surigao City

The Surigao City Port completed a ₱414 million expansion and upgrade in 2009 to increase its handling capacity and meet increased cargo demand, mainly from its mineral exports . Additional 2000 square meters of reclaimed area and 120 meters of berthing space were added. The port ranks as a major transshipment point in the region.

Lipata Port and Ferry Terminal serves as the entry point to Mindanao Island forming part of the extensive Pan-Philippine Highway (also called Maharlika Highway AH26) that originates from Laoag to its southern terminus in Zamboanga City. The port has regular ro-ro services to the ports of Liloan and San Ricardo, both in Southern Leyte. New port expansion is expected to complete in 2023 and will double its size.

=== Airport ===
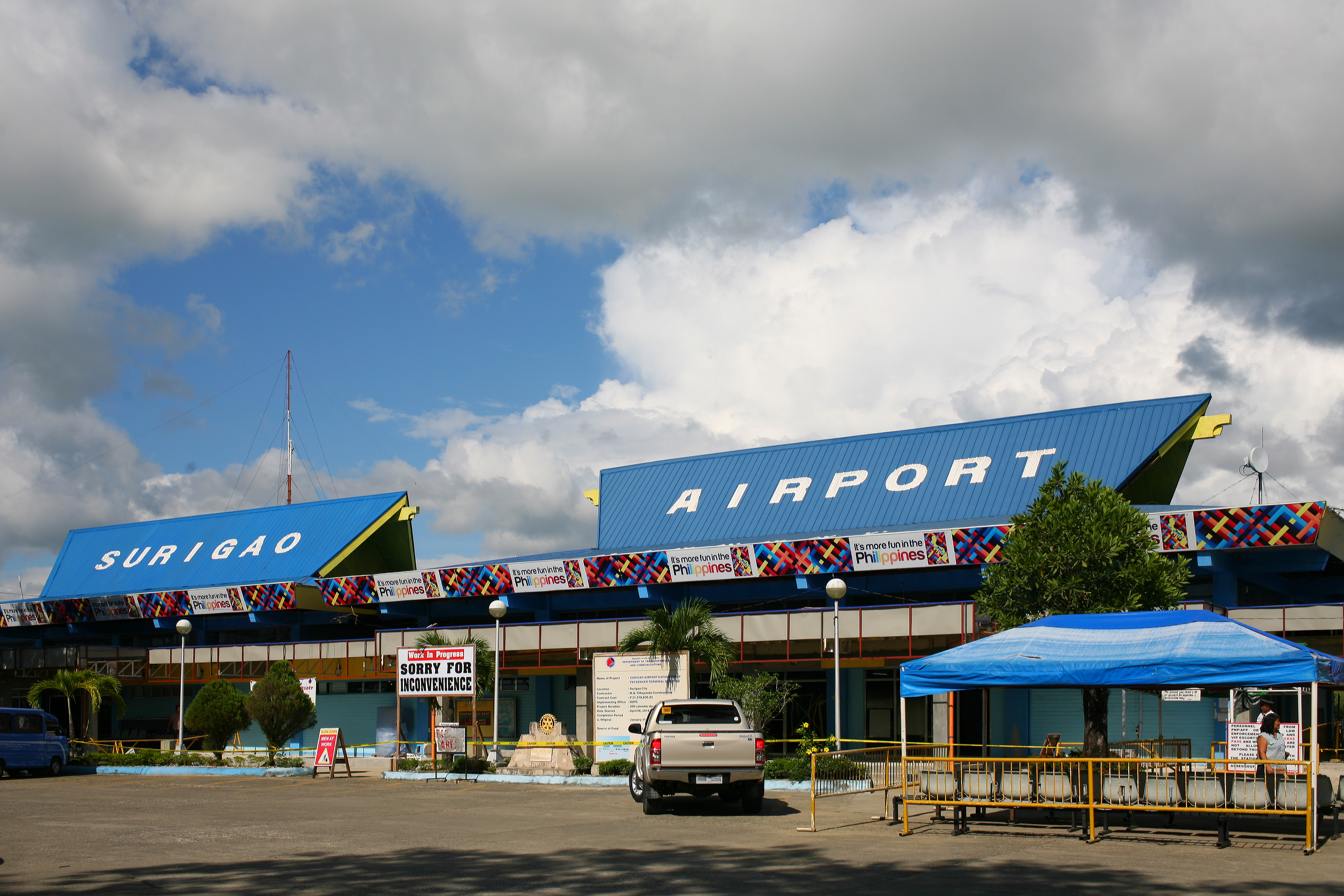
Surigao Airport

Classified by the Civil Aviation Authority of the Philippines as a principal domestic airport, Surigao Airport (SUG) is one of the two airports that serve the province of Surigao del Norte and northern parts of Surigao del Sur and Agusan del Norte. Cebgo has regular scheduled flights from Surigao to Manila (until 2020) and Cebu. Small private planes operate chartered flights to Siargao's Sayak Airport. Due to increased passenger traffic and cargo, it is undergoing feasibility studies for future expansion to accommodate larger aircraft.

=== Telecommunications ===
New facilities built by leading telecommunication companies paved way for clear reception to other parts of the country and the rest of the world. PLDT (formerly PhilCom), Bayantel, Dito Telecommunity, Globe Telecom and Smart Communications (including formerly Cruztelco) operate cell towers in the city.

=== Healthcare ===
On February 11, 1997, the Congress of the Philippines enacted Republic Act 8244 converting Surigao Provincial Hospital into a regional training hospital and renamed it Caraga Regional Hospital, effectively expanding its scope and services that would include the entire Caraga region with a catchment population of over 2 million people. Today, this 150- bed tertiary hospital, a core referral facility, is rapidly expanding with intensive care units that includes Coronary, Pediatric, Surgical and Burn.

In October 2010, the city opened a ₱35 million Drug Rehabilitation and Treatment Center in Anomar. Established under the aegis of the Department of Health, it is the first and only facility in the entire Caraga region solely focused on the treatment and rehabilitation of victims of substance abuse.

Other hospitals in the city include St. Paul University Hospital, Miranda Family Hospital, Surigao Medical Center, and Surigao Doctors' Hospital.

== Education ==
Surigao traces its roots to formal schooling in the year 1906 when the last group of Spanish Benedictine Missionaries, who had worked zealously to have founded the Cartilla or Doctrina School (Escuela Catolica de San Nicolas), vacated Surigao. Soon after their departure, the Missionaries of the Sacred Heart also known as the Dutch Fathers, succeeded them, created the parish of Surigao, and made the Escuela Catolica de San Nicolas a parochial school which later became San Nicolas College. In 2002, Surigao became the first urban center in the entire Caraga region to host a university after San Nicolas College changed its nomenclature in 2004 to St. Paul University Surigao, a part of the St. Paul University System.

In 1969, Surigao del Norte School of Arts and Trades was established on 1.2 hectares of land donated by the provincial government. It focused on curricula geared towards technology at a time the city saw rapid transformation with the onset of nickel exploration at the Nonoc island refinery. While the school was built, it initially held classes at the Provincial Sports Complex with a core census of 14 teachers and 103 students. In 1998, the school was renamed Surigao State College of Technology after it merged with Malimono School of Fisheries. On June 4, 2013, Surigao del Norte State University was established under Rep. Act 10600, integrating Surigao del Norte State College of Technology with Siargao National College of Science and Technology in Del Carmen and the Surigao del Norte College of Agriculture and Technology in Mainit.

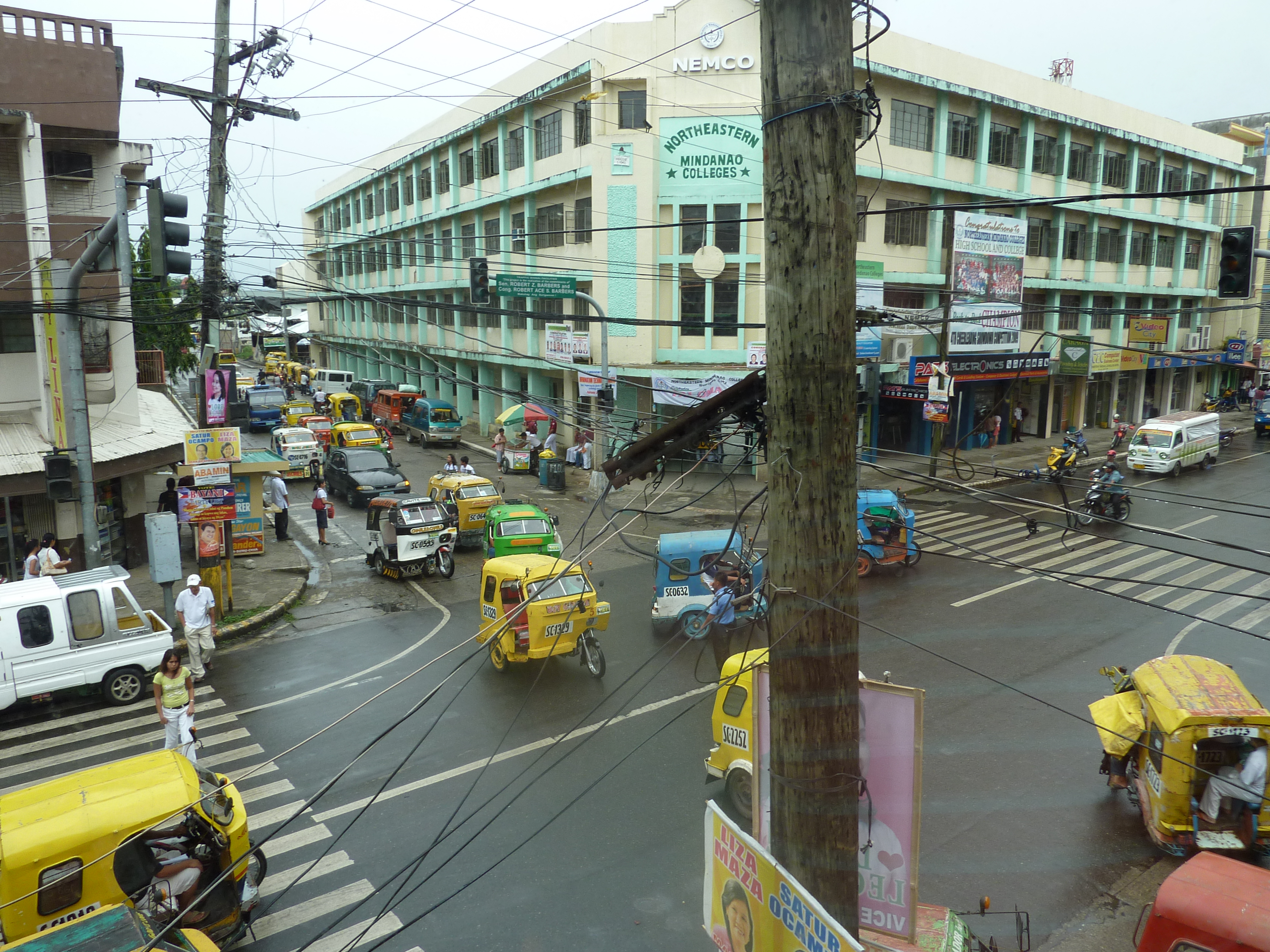
NEMCO in 2010

San Sebastian College - Recoletos College of Law - Surigao City Extension located in Taft opened in 1997. Other colleges in the city include Surigao Education Center, St. Jude Thaddeus Institute of Technology, STI College Surigao (with 3 campuses), Northeastern Mindanao Colleges (NEMCO), St Ignatius Loyola Computer College, and the newly established Surigao Doctors' College (formerly the Center for Healthcare Professions - Surigao). In 1996, Caraga Regional Science High School was established in San Juan, providing students in the region access to a specialized science secondary curriculum. Students undergo a 4- level curriculum which includes two years of general studies and two years of a chosen major. The school's students have consistently placed among the highest scorers in the National Secondary Achievement Test (NSAT), and students also have opportunities to carry out independent research and compete in Intel Science Fairs.

== Media ==
=== AM Stations ===
- DXRS RMN 918 (Radio Mindanao Network)
- DXSN 1017 Radyo Magbalantay (Catholic Media Network; inactive)
- DXKS 1080 RPN Radyo Ronda (Radio Philippines Network)

=== FM Stations ===
- 89.3 FMR Bagtik Radio (Philippine Collective Media Corporation)
- 90.1 Power Radio (Tap Digital Media Ventures Corporation)
- 91.5 (Siargao Islands Telewradio Broadcastign Corporation)
- Mellow Touch (FBS Radio Network, soon)
- 93.3 Infinite Radio (St. Jude Thaddeus Institute of Technology)
- 94.1 iFM (Radio Mindanao Network)
- 94.9 Joy FM (Iddes Broadcast Group)
- 96.1 One FM (Radyo Pilipino Corporation)
- 97.3 Juander Radyo (Rizal Memorial Colleges Broadcasting Corporation/RSV Broadcasting Network, Inc.)
- 98.1 Spirit FM (Catholic Media Network)
- 100.5 DXAF Radyo Alternatibo (Prime Broadcasting Network)
- 104.7 Real Radio (PEC Broadcasting Corporation)
- 105.5 Brigada News FM (Brigada Mass Media Corporation)
- 106.5 Energy FM (Ultrasonic Broadcasting System)
- 107.3 K5 News FM Surigao (Subic Broadcasting Corporation/5K Broadcasting Network)

=== TV Stations ===
- D-10-XA-10 Surigao (GMA) - GMA Network, Inc.
- DXSJ-12 (ABS-CBN, affiliate; defunct) - SJTIT
- TV-23 (S+A, defunct)
- DXAW-27 (GTV) - GMA Network, Inc.

=== Cable Providers ===
- Surigao Cable TV Network
- LTCOM Cable TV
- Cignal TV
- G Sat

== Sister cities ==
=== Local ===
- (Philippines) Cagayan de Oro

=== International ===
- Hialeah, Florida, United States
- Seoul, South Korea
