= DWCH =

Air1 Radio (DWCH)
- Batangas City; Philippines
- Broadcast area: Batangas and surrounding areas
- Frequency: 91.9 MHz (HD Radio)
- Branding: 91.9 Air1 Radio

Programming
- Language: Filipino
- Format: Contemporary MOR, OPM

Ownership
- Owner: Iddes Broadcast Group
- Operator: Air1 Global Advertising Corporation

History
- First air date: June 2011
- Call sign meaning: CHannel

Technical information
- Licensing authority: NTC
- Power: 5 kW

91.9 Air1 Radio (DWCH 91.9 MHz) is an FM station owned by Iddes Broadcast Group and operated by Air1 Global Advertising Corporation. Its studios and transmitter are located at the 3rd floor, CNM Bldg., Diversion Road, Brgy. Bolbok, Batangas City. The frequency is formerly owned by Radio Mindanao Network.
