= DWIF =

Radio station in Lucena, Philippines

Max Radio (DWIF)
- Lucena; Philippines
- Broadcast area: Quezon and surrounding areas
- Frequency: 89.5 MHz
- Branding: 89.5 Max Radio

Programming
- Language: Filipino
- Format: Contemporary MOR, OPM

Ownership
- Owner: Iddes Broadcast Group

History
- First air date: November 30, 2007

Technical information
- Licensing authority: NTC
- Power: 5 kW

Links
- Website: www.maxradiofm.com

DWIF (89.5 FM) broadcasting as 89.5 Max Radio, is a radio station owned and operated by Iddes Broadcast Group. Its studios and transmitter are located at 116 M.L. Tagarao St., Brgy. Ilayang Iyam, Lucena.
