= DXGC =

Grace Covenant FM (DXGC)
- Bacolod, Lanao del Norte; Philippines
- Broadcast area: Lanao del Norte
- Frequency: 101.3 MHz
- Branding: 101.3 Grace Covenant FM

Programming
- Languages: Cebuano, Filipino
- Format: Community radio

Ownership
- Owner: Iddes Broadcast Group

History
- First air date: 2015
- Call sign meaning: Grace Covenant

Technical information
- Licensing authority: NTC
- Power: 1 kW

101.3 Grace Covenant FM (DXGC 101.3 MHz) is an FM station owned and operated by Iddes Broadcast Group. Its studios and transmitter are located at Purok 4, Brgy. Poblacion, Bacolod, Lanao del Norte.
