= DXIA =

Joy FM
- Kidapawan; Philippines
- Broadcast area: Eastern Cotabato and surrounding areas
- Frequency: 105.7 MHz
- Branding: Joy FM 105.7

Programming
- Languages: Cebuano, Filipino
- Format: Contemporary MOR, News, Talk

Ownership
- Owner: Iddes Broadcast Group
- Operator: Yaki Company, Inc.

History
- First air date: December 10, 2013
- Former frequencies: 105.5

Technical information
- Licensing authority: NTC
- Power: 5 kW

Links
- Website: joy-rl.com

Joy FM 105.7 (DXIA 105.7 MHz) is an FM station owned by Iddes Broadcast Group and operated by YAKI (Yaman Ang Kalusugan Ingatan) Company, Inc. Its studios and transmitter are located at Brgy. Paco, Kidapawan.
