= DWIA =

Philippine radio station

Core FM (DWIA)
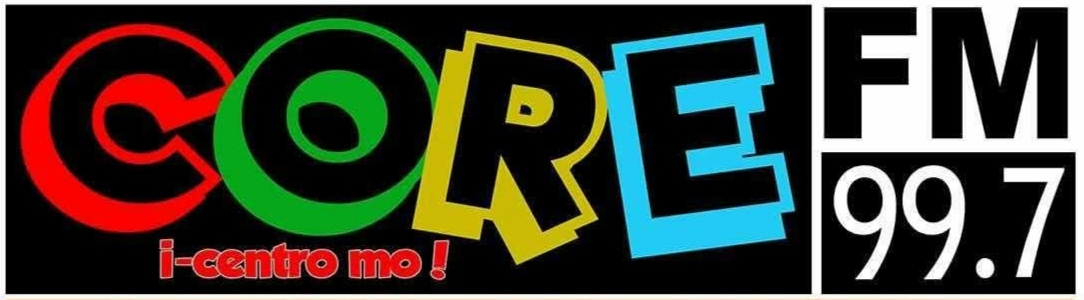
- Vigan; Philippines
- Broadcast area: Ilocos Sur, parts of Ilocos Norte and Abra
- Frequency: 99.7 MHz
- Branding: 99.7 Core FM

Programming
- Languages: Ilocano, Filipino
- Format: Contemporary MOR, News, Talk

Ownership
- Owner: Iddes Broadcast Group

History
- First air date: September 15, 2012
- Call sign meaning: Ilocos Area

Technical information
- Licensing authority: NTC
- Power: 5 kW

Links
- Webcast: Listen Live

99.7 Core FM (DWIA 99.7 MHz) is an FM station in the Philippines owned and operated by Iddes Broadcast Group. Its studios and transmitter are located in Marinella Commercial Complex, Bantay.
