= DXKS-AM =

Radio station in Surigao City, Philippines

Radyo Ronda Surigao (DXKS)
- Surigao City; Philippines
- Broadcast area: Surigao del Norte, Dinagat Islands and surrounding areas
- Frequency: 1080 kHz
- Branding: RPN DXKS Radyo Ronda

Programming
- Languages: Surigaonon, Filipino
- Format: News, Public Affairs, Talk, Drama
- Network: Radyo Ronda

Ownership
- Owner: Radio Philippines Network

History
- First air date: 1962
- Call sign meaning: Kanlaon Surigao

Technical information
- Licensing authority: NTC
- Class: CDE
- Power: 5,000 watts

Links
- Webcast: https://tunein.rpnradio.com/surigao
- Website: https://rpnradio.com/dxks-surigao/

DXKS (1080 AM) Radyo Ronda is a radio station owned and operated by the Radio Philippines Network. Its studio is located at 3rd Floor, Yuipco Lim Bldg., Borromeo St., Brgy. Taft, Surigao City, and its transmitter is located in Brgy. Cagniog, Surigao City.
