= DXSN-FM =

Radyo Pilipinas Agusan del Sur (DXSN)
- San Francisco; Philippines
- Broadcast area: Eastern Agusan del Sur, parts of Surigao del Sur
- Frequency: 92.7 MHz
- Branding: 92.7 Radyo Pilipinas

Programming
- Languages: Cebuano, Filipino
- Format: Contemporary MOR, OPM

Ownership
- Owner: Iddes Broadcast Group

History
- Former names: Smile FM
- Call sign meaning: San Francisco

Technical information
- Licensing authority: NTC
- Power: 5,000 watts

DXSN (92.7 FM), broadcasting as 92.7 Radyo Pilipinas, is a radio station owned and operated by Iddes Broadcast Group. Its studio is located at the 2nd floor, Dela Rosa Bldg., Purok 2-B, Brgy. 1, San Francisco, Agusan del Sur. Despite the station's current branding, it is not to be confused with the state-run Presidential Broadcasting Service's radio network of the same name.
