= Radyo Magbalantay =

Philippine radio station

Surigao City; Philippines
- Broadcast area: Surigao del Norte, Dinagat Islands and surrounding areas
- Frequency: 98.1 MHz
- Branding: 98.1 Radyo Magbalantay

Programming
- Languages: Surigaonon, Filipino
- Format: News, Public Affairs, Talk, Religious
- Affiliations: Catholic Media Network

Ownership
- Owner: Silangan Broadcasting Corporation

History
- First air date: August 22, 1971
- Former call signs: DXSN (1971-2021)
- Former frequencies: 1017 kHz (1971-2021)

Technical information
- Licensing authority: NTC
- Class: CDE
- Power: 5,000 watts

Radyo Magbalantay (98.1 FM) is a radio station owned and operated by Silangan Broadcasting Corporation, the media arm of the Roman Catholic Diocese of Surigao. Its studio is located along Magallanes St., Surigao City.

In 2021, the station went off the air after the transmitter was destroyed by Typhoon Odette. The following year, it returned on air, this time at 98.1 FM.
