= DWIN-FM =

Radio station in Isabela, Philippines

Win FM (DWIN)
- Roxas; Philippines
- Broadcast area: Western Isabela, parts of Mountain Province and Ifugao
- Frequency: 107.5 MHz
- Branding: 107.5 Win FM

Programming
- Languages: Ilocano, Filipino
- Format: Contemporary MOR, OPM, Talk

Ownership
- Owner: Iddes Broadcast Group

History
- First air date: 2001
- Call sign meaning: Win

Technical information
- Licensing authority: NTC
- Power: 5 kW

Links
- Webcast: Listen Live

107.5 Win FM (DWIN 107.5 MHz) is an FM station owned and operated by Iddes Broadcast Group. Its studios and transmitter are located at 3/F, Kingsheen Bldg., Don Mariano Marcos Ave., Roxas, Isabela.
