= DXGT =

Radio station in Bukidnon, Philippines

Radyo Abante (DXGT)
- Maramag; Philippines
- Broadcast area: Bukidnon
- Frequency: 92.1 MHz
- Branding: DXGT Radyo Abante 92.1

Programming
- Languages: Cebuano, Filipino
- Format: Contemporary MOR, News, Talk

Ownership
- Owner: Iddes Broadcast Group

History
- First air date: 2003
- Former frequencies: 102.1 MHz (2003 - 2010s)
- Call sign meaning: Gordon Torres

Technical information
- Licensing authority: NTC
- Power: 5,000 watts
- ERP: 10,000 watts

DXGT (92.1 FM), broadcasting as Radyo Abante 92.1, is a radio station owned and operated by Iddes Broadcast Group. Its studios and transmitter are located beside the Maramag Integrated Bus Terminal, Brgy. North Poblacion, Maramag. The station is managed by former Bukidnon 3rd District board member Gordon Torres.

== Incidents ==
The radio station was attacked with a grenade in June 2013 during a broadcast by one of its commentators, Joas Dignos. Dignos was shot and killed in November 2013 in Valencia. Local police investigating the case did not rule out the possibility that the Dignos was targeted for his political commentary. According to the Committee to Protect Journalists, the incident is part of a pattern of killings that have earned the Philippines a reputation as "one of the most dangerous places in the world to be a reporter".
