= List of radio stations in Cagayan Valley =

The following is a list of NTC-licensed radio stations in Cagayan Valley, a region of the Philippines, current as of 2025. The tables can be sorted by call sign, branding, frequency, location, owner, languages and radio format. Also included are defunct stations and Internet-only stations.

== Radio stations ==
Call sign	Branding	Frequency	Location	Owner	Languages	Format
DWBI	Radyo Kidlat Aparri	103.9 FM	Aparri, Cagayan	Cagayan II Electric Cooperative (Presidential Broadcast Service affiliate)	Tagalog, Ilocano, Ibanag	community radio
DWBH	Radyo Kidlat Alicia	91.9 FM	Alicia, Isabela	Isabela Electric Cooperative II (Presidential Broadcast Service affiliate)	Tagalog, Ilocano, Ibanag	community radio
DWBO	Tuao FM	102.3 FM	Tuao, Cagayan	Municipality of Tuao	Tagalog, Ilocano, Gaddang	full-service radio
DWBT	Radyo Pilipinas Basco	1134 AM	Basco, Batanes	Presidential Broadcast Service	Tagalog, Ilocano, Ivatan	news/talk
DWCJ	Radyo Bayanian	98.1 FM	Peñablanca, Cagayan	National Irrigation Administration	Tagalog, Ilocano, Ibanag	full-service radio
DWCN	Magik FM Tuguegarao	91.7 FM	Tuguegarao, Cagayan	Century Broadcasting Network	Tagalog, Ilocano, Ibanag	masa
DWCY	Radyo Natin Claveria	100.1 FM	Claveria, Cagayan	MBC Media Group	Tagalog, Ilocano	community radio (Radyo Natin)
DWDC	Big Sound FM Solano	101.3 FM	Solano, Nueva Vizcaya	Vanguard Radio Network	Tagalog, Ilocano	masa/contemporary MOR
DWDY	DWDY 1107	1107 AM	Cauayan, Isabela	Presidential Broadcast Service	Tagalog, Ilocano	full-service radio
DWET-AM	Life Radio Santiago	1179 AM	Santiago, Isabela	Pentecostal Missionary Church of Christ (4th Watch) (operated by End-Time Mission Broadcasting Service)	English, Tagalog, Ilocano	Pentecostal religious broadcasting
DWEX	FMR Cagayan	94.9 FM	Peñablanca, Cagayan	Philippine Collective Media Corporation	Tagalog, Ilocano, Ibanag	masa, news/talk
DWGL	Radyo Natin Bayombong	104.5 FM	Bayombong, Nueva Vizcaya	MBC Media Group	Tagalog, Ilocano	community radio (Radyo Natin)
DWIN-FM	Win FM	107.5 FM	Alicia, Isabela	Iddes Broadcast Group	Tagalog, Ilocano	masa, news/talk
N/A	Adventist World Radio (AWR Santiago)	89.1 FM	Santiago, Isabela	Adventist Media	English, Tagalog, Ilocano	Christian Religious & Spirituality / Seventh-day
DWIP	Love Radio Santiago	94.5 FM	Santiago, Isabela	MBC Media Group	Tagalog	masa
DWIX	Magik FM Cauayan	90.5 FM	Cauayan, Isabela	Century Broadcasting Network	Tagalog, Ilocano	masa
DWKD	iFM Cauayan	98.5 FM	Cauayan, Isabela	Radio Mindanao Network	Tagalog, Ilocano	masa
DWMG	DWMG 1395	1395 AM	Bayombong, Nueva Vizcaya	Vanguard Radio Network	Tagalog, Ilocano	news/talk
DWMN	Love Radio Tuguegarao	94.1 FM	Tuguegarao, Cagayan	MBC Media Group	Tagalog, Ilocano	masa
DWMX	Sweet FM	97.7 FM	Santiago, Isabela	Soundstream Broadcasting Corporation (Catholic Media Network)	Tagalog, Ilocano	masa, Roman Catholic religious broadcasting
DWND	DWND 88.9	88.9 FM	Cauayan, Isabela	Northeastern Broadcasting Service	Tagalog, Ilocano	news/talk
DWNS	UFM Bayombong	96.5 FM	Bayombong, Nueva Vizcaya	Nueva Vizcaya State University	English, Tagalog, Ilocano	campus radio
DWPE	Radyo Pilipinas Tuguegarao	729 AM	Tuguegarao, Cagayan	Presidential Broadcast Service	Tagalog, Ilocano	news/talk
DWQP	DWQP 92.1	92.1 FM	Maddela, Quirino	Provincial Government of Quirino	Tagalog, Ilocano	community radio
DWRH (DZRH relay)	DZRH Isabela	648 AM	Santiago, Isabela	MBC Media Group	Tagalog	news/talk
DWRJ (DZRJ-FM relay)	RJFM Tuguegarao	96.5 FM	Tuguegarao, Cagayan	Rajah Broadcasting Network (operated by Free Air Broadcasting Network)	English	adult hits
DWRL	DWRL 95.1	95.1 FM	Lal-lo, Cagayan	Municipality of Lal-lo	Tagalog, Ilocano, Ibanag	masa, news/talk
DWRV-AM	Radyo Veritas Bayombong	1233 AM	Bayombong, Nueva Vizcaya	Catholic Media Network	Tagalog, Ilocano	Roman Catholic religious broadcasting
DWSH	Radyo Kidlat Bayombong	100.5 FM	Bayombong, Cagayan	Nueva Vizcaya Electric Cooperative (Presidential Broadcast Service affiliate)	Tagalog, Ilocano	community radio
DWTB (DWTO relay)	TAPS Radio Roxas	107.9 FM	Roxas, Isabela	Top Achievers Private School	Tagalog, Ilocano	masa
DWTO	TAPS Radio Alicia	107.1 FM	Alicia, Isabela	Top Achievers Private School	Tagalog, Ilocano	masa
DWTR	Radyo Natin Santiago	93.7 FM	Santiago, Isabela	MBC Media Group (operated by Philippine Broadcasting Corporation)	Tagalog, Ilocano	community radio (Radyo Natin)
DWVA	Brigada News FM Cauayan	92.9 FM	Cauayan, Isabela	Baycomms Broadcasting Corporation (operated by Brigada Mass Media Corporation)	Tagalog, Ilocano	masa, news/talk
DWVX	Brigada News FM Tuguegarao	92.5 FM	Tuguegarao, Cagayan	Baycomms Broadcasting Corporation (operated by Brigada Mass Media Corporation)	Tagalog, Ilocano	masa, news/talk
DWVY	Radyo Cagayano	90.1 FM	Baggao, Cagayan	Cagayan Broadcasting System	Tagalog, Ilocano, Ibanag	community radio
DWWC	Big Sound FM Cauayan	95.3 FM	Cauayan, Isabela	Vanguard Radio Network	Tagalog, Ilocano	masa
DWWF	Radyo Natin Basco	103.7 FM	Basco, Batanes	MBC Media Group	Tagalog, Ilocano, Ivatan	community radio (Radyo Natin)
DWWQ-FM	Barangay LS Tuguegarao	89.3 FM	Tuguegarao, Cagayan	GMA Network	Tagalog, Ilocano, Ibanag	masa
DWWW	Radyo Natin Aparri	102.1 FM	Aparri, Cagayan	MBC Media Group	Tagalog, Ilocano, Ibanag	community radio (Radyo Natin)
DWXY	Big Sound FM Tuguegarao	100.5 FM	Tuguegarao, Cagayan	Vanguard Radio Network	Tagalog, Ilocano	masa
DWYE	Yes FM Cauayan	89.7 FM	Cauayan, Isabela	MBC Media Group	Tagalog, Ilocano,	masa
DZCV	Radyo Sanggunian	684 AM	Tuguegarao, Cagayan	Radio Mindanao Network (operated by Filipino Broadcasting Network)	Tagalog, Ilocano, Ibanag	news/talk
DZDA	Radyo Pangkaunlaran	105.3 FM	Tuguegarao, Cagayan	Presidential Broadcast Service	Tagalog, Ilocano, Ibanag	full-service radio
DZGR	Bombo Radyo Tuguegarao	891 AM	Tuguegarao, Cagayan	Bombo Radyo Philippines (operated by People's Broadcasting System)	Tagalog, Ilocano, Ibanag	news/talk
DZHR (DZRH relay)	DZRH Tuguegarao	576 AM	Tuguegarao	MBC Media Group	Tagalog	news/talk
DZJD	Happy Radio	102.5 FM	Tumauini, Isabela	Philippine Collective Media Corporation	Tagalog, Ilocano	masa, news/talk
DZMR	Missions Radio	1143 AM	Santiago, Isabela	Far East Broadcasting Company	English, Tagalog, Ilocano	Evangelical religious broadcasting
DZNB	Radyo Kavayvayan	97.5 FM	Basco, Batanes	National Nutrition Council (operated by Province of Batanes)	Tagalog, Ilocano, Ivatan	community radio (Nutriskwela Community Radio)
DZNC	Bombo Radyo Cauayan	801 AM	Cauayan, Isabela	Bombo Radyo Philippines (operated by People's Broadcasting System)	Tagalog, Ilocano, Ibanag	news/talk
DZND	Radyo Kalugaran	97.5 FM	Claveria, Cagayan	National Nutrition Council (operated by Municipality of Claveria)	Tagalog, Ilocano	community radio (Nutriskwela Community Radio)
DZRC	Radio Maria Isabela	102.1 FM	Santiago, Isabela	Radio Maria Philippines (Catholic Media Network)	English, Tagalog, Ilocano	Roman Catholic religious broadcasting (Radio Maria)
DZRD	Radio Maria Tuguegarao	101.5 FM	Tuguegarao, Cagayan	Radio Maria Philippines (Catholic Media Network)	English, Tagalog, Ilocano	Roman Catholic religious broadcasting (Radio Maria)
DZRI-FM	K5 News FM Santiago	100.1 FM	Santiago, Isabela	Apollo Broadcast Investors (operated by 5K Broadcasting Network)	Tagalog, Ilocano	news/talk
DZRV-FM	Spirit FM Bayombong	90.1 AM	Bayombong, Nueva Vizcaya	Catholic Media Network	Tagalog, Ilocano	masa/contemporary MOR, Roman Catholic religious broadcasting
DZVJ	Radyo Natin Maddela	101.7 FM	Maddela, Quirino	MBC Media Group	Tagalog, Ilocano	community radio (Radyo Natin)
TBD	FMR Nueva Vizcaya	93.3 FM	Bambang, Nueva Vizcaya	Philippine Collective Media Corporation	Tagalog, Ilocano	masa, news/talk
TBD	XFM Tuguegarao	95.7 FM	Tuguegarao, Cagayan	Palawan Broadcasting Corporation (operated by Y2H Broadcasting Network)	Tagalog, Ilocano	masa
TBD	CPIO Teleradyo	100.9 FM	Lal-lo, Cagayan	Province of Cagayan (operated by. Cagayan Public Information Office)	Tagalog, Ilocano, Ibanag	masa, news/talk
TBD	XFM Isabela	104.9 FM	Santiago, Isabela	Y2H Broadcasting Network	Tagalog, Ilocano	masa
TBD	Radyo Santa Ana	106.3 FM	Santa Ana, Cagayan	Municipality of Santa Ana	Tagalog, Ilocano	community radio
TBD	Advanced Academy Radio	107.9 FM	Santa Ana, Cagayan	Advanced Academy of Northern Philippines	English, Tagalog, Ilocano	full-service radio
TBD (DWTO relay)	TAPS Radio Cauayan	107.9 FM	Cauayan, Isabela	Top Achievers Private School	Tagalog, Ilocano	masa
TBD (DWTO relay)	TAPS Radio Santiago	107.9 FM	Santiago, Isabela	Top Achievers Private School	Tagalog, Ilocano	masa
Government-owned/operated station; Station under NTC provisional authority and/or on test broadcast.

== Defunct ==
- DWFF
- RPN DZTG Radyo Ronda Tuguegarao 612
