= List of radio stations in the Philippines =

This is a list of radio stations in the Philippines in which stations per region are divided per article.

== Stations by region or province ==
=== Luzon ===
- List of radio stations in Metro Manila
- List of radio stations in the Cordillera Administrative Region
- List of radio stations in Ilocos Region
- List of radio stations in Cagayan Valley
- List of radio stations in Central Luzon
- List of radio stations in Southern Tagalog
- List of radio stations in Bicol Region

=== Visayas ===
- List of radio stations in Western Visayas
  - List of radio stations in Iloilo
- List of radio stations in Negros Island Region
- List of radio stations in Central Visayas
  - List of radio stations in Cebu
- List of radio stations in Eastern Visayas

=== Mindanao ===
- List of radio stations in Zamboanga Peninsula
- List of radio stations in Northern Mindanao
  - List of radio stations in Misamis Oriental
- List of radio stations in Davao Region
  - List of radio stations in Davao City
- List of radio stations in Soccsksargen
- List of radio stations in Caraga
- List of radio stations in Bangsamoro

== Stations by network ==
=== National ===
==== Networked brands ====
- Aksyon Radyo (news/talk: MBC Media Group)
- Barangay LS (masa/contemporary MOR and OPM: GMA Network)
- Big Sound FM/Big Radio (masa/contemporary MOR and OPM: Vanguard Radio Network)
- Bombo Radyo (news/talk: Bombo Radyo Philippines)
- Brigada News FM (news/talk, masa/contemporary MOR and OPM: Baycomms Broadcasting Corporation)
- DZRH (news/talk: MBC Media Group)
- Eagle FM adult hits, OPM: Eagle Broadcasting Corporation (Metro Manila only)
- Easy Radio (news/talk, masa/contemporary MOR and OPM: Capitol Broadcasting Center)
- Easy Rock (soft adult contemporary and OPM: MBC Media Group)
- Energy FM (masa/contemporary MOR and OPM: Ultrasonic Broadcasting System)
- FMR Philippines (masa/contemporary MOR and OPM: Philippine Collective Media Corporation)
- Home Radio (Soft AC: Aliw Broadcasting Corporation)
- iFM (masa/contemporary MOR and OPM: Radio Mindanao Network)
- K5 News FM (news/talk, masa/contemporary MOR and OPM: 5K Broadcasting Network)
- Like FM (top 40 or masa/contemporary MOR and OPM: Capitol Broadcasting Center)
- Love Radio (masa/contemporary MOR and OPM: MBC Media Group)
- Magic (top 40: Tiger 22 Media Corporation)
- Monster (top 40: Audiovisual Communicators)
- One FM (masa/contemporary MOR and OPM: Radyo Pilipino Corporation)
- Radyo Natin (community radio: MBC Media Group)
- Radyo Sincero (masa/contemporary MOR and OPM: ABJ Broadcasting Services)
- Radyo Totoo/Radyo Veritas (news/talk, Roman Catholic religious broadcasting: Catholic Media Network)
- RJFM (adult hits: Rajah Broadcasting Network)
- Solid FM (Soft AC: Yes2Health Broadcasting)
- Spirit FM (masa/contemporary MOR and OPM, and Roman Catholic religious broadcasting: Catholic Media Network)
- Star FM (masa/contemporary MOR and OPM: Bombo Radyo Philippines)
- Super Radyo (news/talk: GMA Network)
- True FM (news/talk: TV5 Network, Inc.)
- Wild FM (masa/contemporary MOR, Dance, OPM: UM Broadcasting Network)
- Win Radio (masa/contemporary MOR and OPM: Mabuhay Broadcasting System)
- XFM (news/talk, masa/contemporary MOR and OPM: Yes2Health Broadcasting)
- Yes FM (masa/contemporary MOR and OPM: MBC Media Group)

=== Defunct ===
- Crossover (smooth jazz, Mareco Broadcasting Network: stations rebranded, programming migrated online)
- DWIZ News FM (news/talk: Aliw Broadcasting Corporation, provincial stations reformatted back to soft adult contemporary as Home Radio)
- MOR My Only Radio (masa/contemporary MOR and OPM: ABS-CBN Corporation, stations shut down and migrated online)
- Radyo Patrol (news/talk: ABS-CBN Corporation, stations shut down)
- WRocK (soft adult contemporary and OPM: ACWS-United Broadcasting Network, most stations sold to MBC and rebranded Easy Rock)

== Stations by ownership group ==
- ABJ Broadcasting Services
- Advanced Media Broadcasting System
- Aliw Broadcasting Corporation
- Allied Broadcasting Center
- Apollo Broadcast Investors
- Audiovisual Communicators
- Beta Broadcasting System
- Bombo Radyo Philippines
- Bohol Chronicle Radio Corp.
- Brigada Mass Media Corporation
  - Baycomms Broadcasting Corporation
- Caceres Broadcasting Corporation
- Capitol Broadcasting Center
  - Jose M. Luison And Sons Broadcasting Corporation
- Catholic Media Network
- Century Broadcasting Network
- Christian Music Power
- DCG Radio-TV Network
- Eagle Broadcasting Corporation
- Far East Broadcasting Company
- FBS Radio Network
- Filipinas Broadcasting Network
- GMA Network (list)
- Hypersonic Broadcasting Center
- Iddes Broadcast Group
- Information Broadcast Unlimited
- Interactive Broadcast Media
- Intercontinental Broadcasting Corporation (state-owned)
- Kalayaan Broadcasting System
- Mabuhay Broadcasting System
- Mareco Broadcasting Network
- MBC Media Group
  - Pacific Broadcasting System
  - Cebu Broadcasting Company
  - Philippine Broadcasting Corporation
- Nonglading Broadcasting System
- Palawan Broadcasting Corporation
- PBN Broadcasting Network
- Philippine Collective Media Corporation
- PEC Broadcasting Corporation
- Polytechnic Foundation of Cotabato and Asia
- Presidential Broadcasting Service (state-owned)
- Prime Broadcasting Network
- Progressive Broadcasting Corporation
- Radio Mindanao Network
  - Interactive Broadcast Media
- Radio Philippines Network
- Radyo Pilipino Corporation
- Rajah Broadcasting Network
- Rizal Memorial Colleges Broadcasting Corporation
- RSV Broadcasting Network
- Sagay Broadcasting Corporation
- Soundstream Broadcasting Corporation
- Southern Broadcasting Network
- St. Jude Thaddeus Institute of Technology
- Subic Broadcasting Corporation
- Tagbilaran Broadcasting System
- Tiger 22 Media Corporation
  - Quest Broadcasting Inc.
  - Raven Broadcasting Corporation
  - Blockbuster Broadcasting System
  - Real Radio Network Inc.
- Times Broadcasting Network Corporation
- TV5 Network (list)
  - Nation Broadcasting Corporation
- UM Broadcasting Network
- Ultrasonic Broadcasting System
- Vimcontu Broadcasting Corporation
- Y2H Broadcasting Network Inc.
- Vanguard Radio Network
- ZOE Broadcasting Network

=== Defunct ===
- ABS-CBN Corporation
- Sonshine Media Network International

== Internet stations ==
Name	Company	Format	kbit/s	Broadcast Area
107.9 U Radio	Brainstone Broadcasting	electronic dance music		Manila
Atlantis Radio	AMFM Philippines	Easy listening, adult contemporary		International
Crossover Online	Mareco Broadcasting Network	smooth jazz	32	International
Fresh FM Philippines	Dan Cabisada	contemporary hits		Manila
Green Giant FM	De La Salle University	college radio, contemporary hits, indie	32	International
IDMZ Sayaw Pinoy		dance music, remixed music		Manila
MOR Entertainment	ABS-CBN Corporation	Contemporary MOR, original Pilipino music, P-pop		International
MyxRadio	ABS-CBN International	contemporary hits, Hip hop, R&B		International
NU 107 Cebu		alternative rock		Cebu
One FM	Radyo Pilipino Media Group	Contemporary MOR, original Pilipino music		Manila
Pinoy Radio UK	Channel Philippines Network	adult contemporary, original Pilipino music, talk		London
Pinoy Rap Radio		Pinoy hip hop, Rap		Davao
Pinoy Seoul Radio	Pinoy Seoul	K-pop, P-pop	96	International
Radio Pilipinas		independent music, original Pilipino music	32	Manila
Radyo Pilipino	Radyo Pilipino Media Group	adult contemporary, original Pilipino music, talk		Manila
Radyo QC	Quezon City	community radio	32	International
Radyo Tabloidista	Abante	original Pilipino music	32	Manila
Rakista Radio	Rakista.com	Pinoy rock		Manila
Remix Radio	Power Beats Club	electronic dance music		International
Saved Media	Christ's Heritage Church	contemporary Christian	96	Manila
Tee Radio	Tee Radio Media Entertainment	adult contemporary, original Pilipino music	64	International
UST Tiger Radio	University of Santo Tomas	campus radio, contemporary hits, indie	128	Manila
WXB 102		alternative, new wave	128, 64, 32	International
102.3 XFM Naga	IMJ Interactive	contemporary hits, OPM	128	Naga / International

== Satellite-only stations ==
List of satellite radio stations available on direct-to-home (DTH) satellite only:

Channel	Name of Radio Station	Direct to Home Provider
300	DZRH	Cignal
301	Love Radio 90.7	Cignal
302	Yes 101.1 - FM	Cignal
303	Magic 89.9 -FM	Cignal
304	99.5 Play FM (Now 99.5 xFM Manila)	Cignal
305	True FM	Cignal
306	GV FM - Angeles	Cignal
307	102.7 Star FM	Cignal
308	93.9 iFM	Cignal
309	DZXL 558	Cignal
310	RX 93.1	Cignal
311	CMN	Cignal
312	Radio Channel	Cignal
313	Radio Veritas 846	Cignal
314	98.7 DZFE	Cignal
315	Radio Maria	Cignal
316	FM2 (Now 104.3 The Capital)	Cignal
317	92.3 FMR MNL KA-VIBES	Cignal
201	AM RADIO - DZBB	G Sat
202	AM RADIO - DZRH	G Sat
203	AM RADIO - DWIZ	G Sat
204	AM RADIO - DZRJ	G Sat
205	AM RADIO - DZRB	G Sat
206	FM RADIO - K-LITE (Now 103.5 ALLRADIO)	G Sat
207	FM RADIO - DWFO	G Sat
208	FM RADIO - DWFT	G Sat
209	FM RADIO - DZRJ	G Sat
210	FM RADIO - DZMB	G Sat
211	FM RADIO - DWLS	G Sat
212	FM RADIO - POP	G Sat
213	FM RADIO - JAZZ	G Sat
214	FM RADIO - ROCK	G Sat

== Shortwave stations ==
Call Sign	Name of Radio Service
DZRP	Radyo Pilipinas World Service
FEBC	Far East Broadcasting Company

International stations (China Radio International, Voice of America, BBC World Service, KBS World Radio, NHK World Radio Japan, Radio Thailand World Service, Radio Taiwan International and others) are heard via shortwave as well.

== See also ==
- Radio in the Philippines
- List of television stations in the Philippines
