= List of radio stations in the Ilocos Region =

This is a list of radio stations operating in the Ilocos Region, a part of Luzon island in the Philippines.

== Ilocos Norte ==
=== AM Stations ===
Callsign	Frequency	Branding	Location	Owner	Languages	Format
DZRL	639 kHz	Radyo Ronda Batac	Batac	Radio Philippines Network, Inc.	Ilocano, Filipino	News, Public Affairs, Talk, Drama
DZVR	711 kHz	Bombo Radyo Laoag	Laoag	Newsounds Broadcasting Network, Inc. (part of Bombo Radyo Philippines)	Ilocano, Filipino	News, Public Affairs, Talk, Drama
DZJC	747 kHz	Aksyon Radyo Laoag	Laoag	MBC Media Group	Ilocano, Filipino	News, Public Affairs, Talk, Drama
DZEA	909 kHz	Radyo Totoo Laoag	Laoag	Catholic Bishops Conference of the Philippines (operated by the Diocese of Laoag; a member of the Catholic Media Network)	Ilocano, Filipino	News, Public Affairs, Talk, Religious Radio
DZMT	990 kHz	DZRH Laoag (relay from Manila)	Laoag	Pacific Broadcasting System, Inc. (an affiliate of MBC Media Group)	Ilocano, Filipino	News, Public Affairs, Talk, Drama

=== FM Stations ===
Callsign	Frequency	Name	Location	Owner	Format	Languages
—N/a	89.1 MHz	AWR Cadaratan West	Bacarra	—N/a	Religious (Seventh-day Adventist)	Ilocano, Filipino
DWIL	90.7 MHz	Love Radio Laoag	Laoag	Philippine Broadcasting Corporation (an affiliate of MBC Media Group)	Contemporary MOR, OPM	Ilocano, Filipino
DWNI	91.1 MHz	Radyo Karruba	Burgos	National Nutrition Council (Part of the (Nutriskwela Community Radio network)	Community Radio	Ilocano, Filipino
DWCK	92.3 MHz	Magik FM Laoag	Laoag	Century Broadcasting Network	Contemporary MOR, OPM, News	Ilocano, Filipino
DWAT	93.9 MHz	DWAT 93.9	Laoag	Ilocos Norte College of Arts and Trades	Campus Radio	Ilocano, Filipino
DWHP	99.5 MHz	iFM Laoag	Laoag	Radio Mindanao Network, Inc.	Contemporary MOR, News, Talk	Ilocano, Filipino
DWFB	103.5 MHz	Radyo Pilipinas Laoag	Laoag	Presidential Broadcast Service	News, Public Affairs, Talk, Government Radio	Ilocano, Filipino
DWCI	105.1 MHz	105.1 Adjo FM	Piddig	Municipal Government of Piddig (affiliated with the Philippine Broadcasting Service)	Community Radio, Government Radio	Ilocano, Filipino
DWNE	107.5 MHz	107.5 U-Radio	Laoag	Northwestern University	College Radio	Ilocano, Filipino
Government-owned station.

== Ilocos Sur ==
=== AM Stations ===
Call Sign	Frequency	Name	Location	Owner	Languages	Format
DZVV	603 kHz	Bombo Radyo Vigan	Vigan	People's Broadcasting Service, Inc. (part of Bombo Radyo Philippines)	Ilocano, Filipino	News, Public Affairs, Talk, Drama
DZTP	693 kHz	Radyo Tirad Pass	Candon	Tirad Pass Radio-Television Broadcasting Network (affiliated with Radio Mindanao Network)	Ilocano, Filipino	News, Public Affairs, Talk
DWRS	927 kHz	Commando Radio	Vigan	Solid North Broadcasting System, Inc. (affiliated with Radio Mindanao Network)	Ilocano, Filipino	News, Public Affairs, Talk
DZNS	963 kHz	Radyo Totoo Vigan	Vigan	Catholic Bishops Conference of the Philippines (operated by Archdiocese of Nueva Segovia; a member of the Catholic Media Network)	Ilocano, Filipino	News, Public Affairs, Talk, Religious Radio

=== FM Stations ===
Callsign	Frequency	Name	Location	Owner	Languages	Format
—N/a	88.5 MHz	AWR Ilocos Sur	Santa Cruz	Adventist World Radio	Ilocano, Filipino	Seventh-day Adventist religious broadcasting
DZNP	93.5 MHz	Radyo Kabinnadang	Cervantes	National Nutrition Council (part of the Nutriskwela Community Radio network)	Ilocano, Filipino	Community Radio
DWVN	94.1 MHz	Magik FM Vigan	Vigan	Century Broadcasting Network	Ilocano, Filipino	Contemporary MOR, OPM, News
DZNF	97.3 MHz	Radyo Kailian	Santa Maria	National Nutrition Council (operated by Ilocos Sur Polytechnic State College; part of the Nutriskwela Community Radio network)	Ilocano, Filipino	Community Radio
DWIA	99.7 MHz	99.7 Core FM	Vigan	Iddes Broadcast Group (operated by Core Productions)	Ilocano, Filipino	Contemporary MOR, OPM
DWNP	100.5 MHz	UNP Campus Radio	Vigan	University of Northern Philippines	Ilocano, Filipino	Campus Radio
DWRE	104.5 MHz	Radyo Natin Candon	Candon City	MBC Media Group	Ilocano, Filipino	Community Radio
DWHK	105.3 MHz	iFM Vigan	Vigan	Radio Mindanao Network, Inc.	Ilocano, Filipino	Contemporary MOR, OPM, News, Talk

== La Union ==
=== AM Stations ===
Callsign	Frequency	Name	Location	Owner	Languages	Format
DZSO	720 kHz	Bombo Radyo La Union	San Fernando	Newsounds Broadcasting Network, Inc. (part of Bombo Radyo Philippines)	Ilocano, Filipino	News, Public Affairs, Talk, Drama
DZNL	783 kHz	Aksyon Radyo La Union	San Fernando	Philippine Broadcasting Corporation (an affiliate of MBC Media Group)	Ilocano, Filipino	News, Public Affairs, Talk, Drama

=== FM Stations ===
Callsign	Frequency	Name	Location	Owner	Languages	Format
—N/a	90.5 MHz	One Radio	Bauang	BGC Agency Advertising, Inc.	Ilocano, Filipino	Contemporary MOR, OPM, News
DZAG	97.1 MHz	Radyo Pilipinas Agoo	Agoo	Presidential Broadcast Service	Ilocano, Filipino	News, Public Affairs, Talk, Government Radio
DWST	101.7 MHz	Love Radio La Union	San Fernando	Pacific Broadcasting System, Inc. (an affiliate of MBC Media Group)	Ilocano, Filipino	Contemporary MOR, OPM
DZUL	104.3 MHz	My FM La Union	San Fernando	Sea and Sky Broadcasting, Inc.	Ilocano, Filipino	Contemporary MOR, OPM
DWAA	105.5 MHz	Big Sound FM La Union	San Fernando	Vanguard Radio Network	Ilocano, Filipino	Contemporary MOR, OPM, News
DWIS	106.7 MHz	Radyo Natin Agoo	Agoo	Pacific Broadcasting System, Inc. (an affiliate of MBC Media Group)	Ilocano, Filipino	Community Radio
Government-owned station.

== Pangasinan ==
=== AM Stations ===
Callsign	Frequency	Name	Location	Owner	Languages	Format
DZMQ	576 kHz	Radyo Pilipinas Dagupan	Dagupan	Presidential Broadcast Service	Pangasinense, Filipino, English	News, Public Affairs, Talk, Government Radio
DWCC	756 kHz	Radyo Pilipinas Tayug	Tayug	Presidential Broadcast Service	Pangasinense, Filipino, English	News, Public Affairs, Talk, Government Radio
DZWM	864 kHz	Radyo Totoo Alaminos	Alaminos	Alaminos Community Broadcasting Corporation (Catholic Media Network)	Pangasinense, Filipino, English	News, Public Affairs, Talk, Religious
DWIN	1080 kHz	Radyo Agila Dagupan (semi-satellite of DZEC Manila)	Dagupan	Eagle Broadcasting Corporation	Pangasinense, Filipino, English	News, Public Affairs, Talk, Religious (Iglesia ni Cristo)
DZWN	1125 kHz	Bombo Radyo Dagupan	Dagupan	People's Broadcasting Service, Inc. (part of Bombo Radyo Philippines)	Pangasinense, Filipino, English	News, Public Affairs, Talk, Drama
DWCM	1161 kHz	Aksyon Radyo Dagupan	Dagupan	Philippine Broadcasting Corporation (an affiliate of MBC Media Group; operated by Balon Subol Broadcast Marketing Corporation)	Pangasinense, Filipino, English	News, Public Affairs, Talk, Drama
DWPR	1296 kHz	Radyo Pilipino Dagupan	Dagupan	Beacon Communications Systems, Inc. (a subsidiary of Radyo Pilipino Media Group)	Pangasinense, Filipino, English	News, Public Affairs, Talk
DWDH	1440 kHz	DZRH Dagupan (relay from Manila)	Dagupan	MBC Media Group	Pangasinense, Filipino, English	News, Public Affairs, Talk, Drama
Government-owned station.

=== FM Stations ===
Callsign	Frequency	Name	Location	Owner	Languages	Format
—N/a	87.5 MHz	Niña Aro Taka Radio	Bayambang	Mayor Niña Jose-Quiambao	Pangasinense, Filipino, English	Contemporary MOR, News, Talk
DZCJ	87.7 MHz	Choice Radio	Mangatarem	Presidential Broadcast Service	Pangasinense, Filipino, English	Contemporary MOR, News, Talk
DWJE	88.1 MHz	Radyo Pangasinan	Dagupan	Pangasinan Gulf Waves Network Inc.	Pangasinense, Filipino, English	Contemporary MOR, News, Talk
DWIZ	89.3 MHz	Home Radio Dagupan	Dagupan	Aliw Broadcasting Corporation	English	Soft AC
DWKT	90.3 MHz	Energy FM Dagupan	Dagupan	Ultrasonic Broadcasting System	Pangasinense, Filipino, English	Contemporary MOR, OPM
DWTL	93.5 MHz	Barangay LS Dagupan	Dagupan	GMA Network, Inc.	Pangasinense, Filipino, English	Contemporary MOR, OPM
DWID	98.3 MHz	Love Radio Dagupan	Dagupan	MBC Media Group	Pangasinense, Filipino, English	Contemporary MOR, OPM
DWTJ	99.3 MHz	Spirit FM Alaminos	Alaminos	Catholic Bishops Conference of the Philippines (operated by Lumen Gentium Broadcasting Network, Inc.; a member of the Catholic Media Network)	Pangasinense, Filipino, English	Contemporary MOR, OPM, Religious Radio
DWSF	100.1 MHz	Radyo Natin Alaminos	Alaminos	MBC Media Group	Pangasinense, Filipino, English	Community Radio
DWHY	100.7 MHz	Star FM Dagupan	Dagupan	People's Broadcasting Service, Inc. (part of Bombo Radyo Philippines)	Pangasinense, Filipino, English	Contemporary MOR, OPM, News
DWRD	102.7 MHz	Manaoag Dominican Radio	Manaoag	Manaoag Dominican Broadcasting, Inc.	Pangasinense, Filipino, English	Religious Radio
DZVM	104.1 MHz	Yes FM Urdaneta	Urdaneta	MBC Media Group	Pangasinense, Filipino, English	Contemporary MOR, OPM
DWON	104.7 MHz	iFM Dagupan	Dagupan	Radio Mindanao Network	Pangasinense, Filipino, English	Contemporary MOR, OPM, News, Talk
DWHR	106.3 MHz	Yes FM Dagupan	Dagupan	Pacific Broadcasting System, Inc. (an affiliate of MBC Media Group)	Pangasinense, Filipino, English	Contemporary MOR, OPM
PA	106.9 MHz	Gravity Radio Pozorrubio	Pozorrubio	Amapola Broadcasting System (operated by Poz Agri Coop Innovation)	Pangasinense, Filipino, English	Contemporary MOR, OPM
DWHT	107.9 MHz	DWHT 107.9 (relay from DWWW 774 Manila)	Dagupan	Broadcast Enterprises and Affiliated Media, Inc.	Filipino, English	News, Talk, Oldies
