= List of radio stations in Central Luzon =

This is a list of radio stations in Central Luzon, Philippines.

== Aurora ==
=== AM stations ===
There are no AM Station in Aurora

=== FM stations ===
Call Sign	Name	Frequency	Power	Covered Location	Owner	Format
DWLN	Radyo Natin Baler	88.5 MHz	0.5 kW	Baler	MBC Media Group	Community Radio, Adult Contemporary Music
DWBW	RTV Baler	92.1 MHz	1 kW	Baler	Aurora Polytechnic College	Community Radio, College Radio, Adult Contemporary Music
DWKD	Kris FM (KaTribu Radio) Maria Aurora	95.9 MHz	0.1 kW	Maria Aurora	Amapola Broadcasting System (operated by KaTribu Broadcasting Station)	Contemporary MOR, OPM, Community Radio
DW__	Adventist World Radio Baler (AWR Baler)	97.5 MHz	5 kW	Baler	Digital Broadcasting Corporation (Hope Channel Philippines)	Religious Radio (Seventh-day Adventist Church)
DWBV	One FM Baler	99.3 MHz	5 kW	Baler	Beacon Communications Systems (Radyo Pilipino Media Group)	Contemporary MOR, (Middle of the Road), News/Talk
DWNQ	Radyo Kawad Casiguran	100.7 MHz	0.1 kW	Casiguran	National Nutrition Council/Nutriskwela Community Radio & Municipal Government of Casiguran	Community Radio
DZJO	Spirit FM Baler	101.7 MHz	5 kW	Baler	Roman Catholic Territorial Prelature of Infanta (a member of the Catholic Media Network)	Catholic Radio
DWNK	Radyo Kaedup Dingalan	102.9 MHz	0.2 kW	Dingalan	National Nutrition Council/Nutriskwela Community Radio & Municipal Government of Dingalan	Community Radio

== Bataan ==
=== AM stations ===
There are no AM Station in Bataan

=== FM stations ===
Call Sign	Name	Frequency	Power	Covered Location	Owner	Format							
—N/a	Arriba Campus Radio Abucay	87.9 MHz	10 W	Abucay	Colegio de San Juan de Letran's Abucay Bataan campus	College Radio, Adult Contemporary Music	DWSE	Smile Radio Balanga	98.3 MHz	5 kW	Balanga	—N/a	Adult Contemporary, Pop, OPM
DZMD	My FM Balanga	100.7 MHz	1 kW	Balanga	M.S Network Management Inc. / MBJE Advertising and Media Services	Adult Contemporary, Pop, OPM							
DZPR	PoweRadio Balanga	104.5 MHz	5 kW	Balanga	—N/a	Adult Contemporary, OPM							

== Bulacan ==
There are no AM stations originating from the province of Bulacan; however, AM radio stations in Metro Manila are being relayed to the stations' transmitter sites situated elsewhere in the province.

=== FM stations ===
Call Sign	Name	Frequency	Power	Covered Location	Owner	Format
DWAP	WAP FM Malolos	88.7 MHz		Malolos	Colegio de San Jose - Malolos	College Radio, Community Radio, Talkback
DWJC	Radyo Bandera Malolos	90.3 MHz	5 kW	Malolos	Bandera News Philippines	Contemporary MOR, News, Talkback
DWRB	DWRB News FM Malolos	103.9 MHz	1 kW	Malolos	Provincial Government of Bulacan (operated by RTV Bulacan Inc.)	Community Radio, College Radio, Music

== Nueva Ecija ==
=== AM stations ===
Call Sign	Name	Amplitude	Power	Covered Location	Owner	Format
DWJJ	DWJJ Cabanatuan	684 kHz	5 kW	Cabanatuan	Double J Ad Ventures, Inc. and Tirad Pass Radio TV Broadcasting Network, Inc.	News, Talkback
DWNE	DWNE Cabanatuan	900 kHz	5 kW	Cabanatuan	Multipoint Broadcasting Network	News, Talkback, Provincial Radio
DZXO	DZXO Cabanatuan	1188 kHz	5 kW	Cabanatuan	Vanguard Radio Network	News, Talkback
DWBR	Radyo Bahai Talavera	1584 kHz	1 kW	Talavera	Dawnbreaker's Foundation	Community radio

=== FM stations ===
Call Sign	Name	Frequency	Power	Covered Location	Owner	Format
DWUP	Radio Wesleyan Cabanatuan	89.7 MHz	10 W	Cabanatuan	Wesleyan University Philippines	College Radio
DZDJ	Radyo Agri PhilMech Muñoz	90.1 MHz	3 kW	Science City of Muñoz	(Presidential Broadcast Service), Department of Agriculture, Philippine Center for Postharvest Development and Mechanization	Contemporary MOR, OPM, News, Talk
D___	NHGL Radio Palayan	92.9 MHz	1 kW	Palayan	Nagkaisang Haranista sa Gintong Luzon, Philippines, Inc.	Contemporary MOR, OPM, News/Talk
DWWG	Big Sound FM Cabanatuan	101.5 MHz	5 kW	Cabanatuan	Vanguard Radio Network	Contemporary MOR, OPM
DWSY	Radyo Natin San Jose	103.3 MHz	1 kW	San Jose	MBC Media Group	Community Radio, Adult Contemporary Music
DWTC	Radyo Natin Guimba	105.3 MHz	1 kW	Guimba	MBC Media Group	Community Radio, Adult Contemporary Music
DWNP	UMFM Palayan	106.5 MHz	5 kW	Palayan	Multipoint Broadcasting Network	Contemporary MOR, News, Talk
DWFA	Radyo CLSU Muñoz	107.3 MHz	1 kW	Science City of Muñoz	Central Luzon State University	Community Radio

== Pampanga ==
=== AM stations ===
Call Sign	Name	Amplitude	Power	Covered Location	Owner	Format
DWGV	GVAM Angeles	792 kHz	5 kW	Angeles City	GV Broadcasting Systems, Inc.	News, Public Affairs, Religious, Kapampangan Music

=== FM stations ===
Call Sign	Name	Frequency	Power	Covered Location	Owner	Format
DWBL	Bright FM San Fernando	91.9 MHz	1 kW	San Fernando	Bright Light Broadcasting Service/Catholic Media Network/Roman Catholic Archdiocese of San Fernando	Christian Radio
DWRW	RW 95.1 San Fernando	95.1 MHz	5 kW	San Fernando	RadioWorld Broadcasting Corporation	Adult Contemporary
DWGV	GV 99.1 Angeles	99.1 MHz	5 kW	Angeles	Apollo Broadcast Investors/GV Radios Network Corporation	Contemporary hit radio
—N/a	Radyo Guagua	99.9 MHz	1 kW	Guagua	Presidential Broadcast Service (Municipal Government of Guagua)	Community Radio
DZNL	Newsline San Fernando	103.1 MHz	1 kW	San Fernando	Soundstream Broadcasting Corporation	Contemporary MOR, News/Talk
DWAU	DWAU Angeles	104.1 MHz	10 W	Angeles	Angeles University Foundation	College Radio
DWEE	D'Ani Kita Radio Magalang	107.1 MHz	1 kW	Magalang	Department of Agriculture	Community Radio

== Tarlac ==
=== AM stations ===
Call Sign	Name	Amplitude	Power	Covered Location	Owner	Format
DZTC	Radyo Pilipino Tarlac	828 kHz	2.5 kW	Tarlac	Radyo Pilipino	News, Public Affairs, Talk

=== FM stations ===
Call Sign	Name	Frequency	Power	Covered Location	Owner	Format
—N/a	TSU Firefox Radio Tarlac	87.5 MHz		Tarlac	Tarlac State University	College radio, Talk, Music
DZMC	Jelexie Radio Tarlac	91.1 MHz	5 kW	Tarlac	Acacia Broadcasting Corporation	News, Talk, Music
DWXT	One FM Tarlac	96.1 MHz	2.5 kW	Tarlac	Radyo Pilipino	Contemporary MOR, OPM
DZLT	Love Radio Tarlac	97.7 MHz	3 kW	Tarlac	MBC Media Group	Contemporary MOR, OPM
DZRM	Radio Maria Tarlac	99.7 MHz	5 kW	Tarlac	Radio Maria Philippines/Catholic Media Network	Catholic Radio

== Zambales ==
=== AM stations ===
Call Sign	Name	Amplitude	Power	Covered Location	Owner	Format
DWHL	Radyo Apo Olongapo	756 kHz	5 kW	Olongapo	Beta Broadcasting System, Inc.	News, Talkback
DWGO	GO AM Olongapo	1008 kHz	5 kW	Olongapo	Subic Broadcasting Corporation	News, Talkback

=== FM stations ===
Call Sign	Name	Frequency	Power	Covered Location	Owner	Format
DZIV	K5 News FM Olongapo	88.7 MHz	5 kW	Olongapo	Apollo Broadcast Investors	Contemporary MOR, News, Talk
DWSB	Subic Bay Radio	89.5 MHz	5 kW	Subic Bay Freeport Zone	Subic Bay Metropolitan Authority (Presidential Broadcast Service)	Adult Top 40
DWTY	Brigada News FM Olongapo	93.5 MHz	10 kW	Olongapo	Brigada Mass Media Corporation	Contemporary MOR, News, Talk
DWCX	Radio Maria Olongapo	95.9 MHz	5 kW	Olongapo	Radio Maria Philippines and Catholic Media Network	Catholic Radio
DWSL	K-Lite Olongapo	96.7 MHz	5 kW	Olongapo	Beta Broadcasting Systems, Inc.	Adult Top 40
DWOK	dwOK FM Olongapo	97.5 MHz	5 kW	Olongapo	Subic Broadcasting Corporation	Adult Contemporary, Top 40, OPM
DWCQ	Radyo Kidlat Castillejos	98.3 MHz	1 kW	Castillejos	ZAMECO II	Community Radio
DWBD	Brigada News FM Olongapo	99.9 MHz		Iba	Brigada Mass Media Corporation	Contemporary MOR, News, Talk
DZRG	RCFM Radyo Pilipinas San Antonio	104.7 MHz	1 kW	San Antonio	Presidential Broadcast Service and Rainbow Connection Civic Group Inc.	Community Radio
DWRQ	Radyo Natin Iba	105.7 MHz	0.5 kW	Iba	MBC Media Group	Community radio
DWFJ	Radyo Bandera Olongapo	107.1 MHz	5 kW	Olongapo	Bandera News Philippines	Contemporary MOR, News, Talk

== Defunct radio stations ==
=== FM stations ===
Call Sign	Name	Frequency	Covered Location	Owner	Format	Date Defunct
DWPN	Radyo Kidlat Tarlac	87.9 MHz	Concepcion	Presidential Broadcast Service (Tarlac 2 Electric Cooperative)	Community Radio	2026 (Note: The year in which the station's entry was deleted off the National Telecommunications Commission's list of authorized broadcast stations.)
DWYC	Donna @88.7	88.7 MHz	Cabanatuan	Nation Broadcasting Corporation	Adult Contemporary, Pop, Hot AC	2008
DWZO	Hot FM Olongapo	91.9 MHz	Olongapo	MBC Media Group & Columban College Inc.	Adult Contemporary, Pop, Hot AC	2012
DWCL	ORFM San Fernando	92.7 MHz	San Fernando	UBC Global Media Ministries Inc.	News, Public Service, Music	2025
DWDU	UFM 105.5	105.5 MHz	Angeles City	Reliance Broadcasting Unlimited	Adult Contemporary	2024
D___	Radyo San Gregorio 106.7 Lite FM San Antonio	106.7 MHz	San Antonio	—N/a	Adult Contemporary, Pop, Hip hop	2017

=== AM stations ===
Frequency	Name	Format	Call Sign	Covered Location	Owner	Date Defunct	Ref
1512 AM	FEN Radio Subic Bay	News Talk, Military radio	DWFE	U.S. Naval Base Subic Bay	Far East Network and AFRTS	1991	
1305 AM	FEN Radio Bataan	News, Talk, Military radio	DWFA	Balanga, Bataan	Far East Network and AFRTS	1991	
1467 AM	Radyo Totoo Nueva Ecija	Religious, News, Talk	DZTH	Cabanatuan	Catholic Media Network	2020	
