= List of radio stations in Bangsamoro =

Below is a list of radio stations in Bangsamoro Region in the Philippines, whose coverage is in part or whole of the same.

== Basilan ==
=== FM stations ===
| Frequency | Name | Company | Format | Call Sign | Power | Location Covered |
|---|---|---|---|---|---|---|
| 94.3 FM | Rose FM | —N/a | community radio | —N/a | 5 KW | Lamitan |
| 97.5 FM | Radyo Komunidad | National Nutrition Council (Nutriskwela Community Radio), operated by the Municipal Government of Basilan | community radio | —N/a | 5 KW | Isabela |
| 99.1 FM | WBA 99.1 | Western Basilan Alliance | community radio | DXPW | 5 KW | Isabela |

== Lanao del Sur ==
=== FM stations ===
| Frequency | Name | Company | Format | Call Sign | Power | Location Covered |
|---|---|---|---|---|---|---|
| 88.3 FM | Wao FM | —N/a | Contemporary MOR, Music, Talk | —N/a | 1 KW | Wao |
| 104.0 FM | ICFM Wao | —N/a | Contemporary MOR, Music, Talk | —N/a | 1 KW | Wao |
| 90.3 FM | Winner FM | —N/a | Contemporary MOR, Music, Talk | —N/a | 1 KW | Wao |
| 94.1 FM | UFM Marawi | Mindanao State University | Islamic radio | —N/a | 5 KW | Marawi |
| 95.5 FM | Cool FM Marawi | Ranao Radio and TV Broadcasting System Corporation | Islamic radio | DXSK | 5 KW | Marawi |
| 97.1 FM | Bangsamoro Radio Suwara Meranaw (BRSM) | —N/a | Islamic radio | —N/a | 5 KW | Marawi |
| 99.7 FM | Radyo Pilipinas Marawi | Presidential Broadcast Service | News, Public affairs, Talk | DXSO | 5 KW | Marawi |
| 100.5 FM | Jill FM | —N/a | Community radio | —N/a | 1 KW | Wao |
| 104.1 FM | Radyo Dansalan | Global Satellite Technology Services | Islamic radio | DXGS | 5 KW | Marawi |
| 105.3 FM | Radyo Arangkada Hot FM | Allied Broadcasting Center | Contemporary MOR, News | DXJN | 1 KW | Wao |
| 106.7 FM | AWR Wao | —N/a | Religious radio (Seventh-day Adventist) | —N/a | 1 KW | Wao |

== Maguindanao del Norte ==
=== AM stations ===
| Frequency | Name | Company | Format | Call Sign | Power | Location Covered |
|---|---|---|---|---|---|---|
| 567 AM | DZRH Cotabato (relay from Manila) | Pacific Broadcasting System (MBC Media Group) | News, Public Affairs, Talk, Drama | DXCH | 10 KW | Cotabato City |
| 882 AM | Radyo Bida Cotabato | Notre Dame Broadcasting Corporation | News, Public Affairs, Talk | DXMS | 10 KW | Cotabato City |

=== FM stations ===
| Frequency | Name | Company | Format | Call Sign | Power | Location Covered |
|---|---|---|---|---|---|---|
| 87.9 FM | Radio Ignacia | Notre Dame – RVM College of Cotabato (Philippine Collective Media Corporation) | campus radio | —N/a | 0.5 KW | Cotabato City |
| 89.3 FM | Brigada News FM Cotabato | Baycomms Broadcasting Corporation (Brigada Mass Media Corporation) | contemporary MOR, news, talk | DXZA | 10 KW | Cotabato City |
| 90.9 FM | RMN Cotabato | Radio Mindanao Network | Contemporary MOR, News, talk | DXMY | 10 KW | Cotabato City |
| 92.1 FM | Voice FM Cotabato | Prime Broadcasting Network (operated by Al-Balagh Foundation) | Community radio | DXJC | 5 KW | Cotabato City |
| 92.7 FM | Happy FM Cotabato | Notre Dame Broadcasting Corporation | Contemporary MOR, OPM | DXOL | 10 KW | Cotabato City |
| 93.7 FM | Star FM Cotabato | Bombo Radyo Philippines (People's Broadcasting Service) | Contemporary MOR, OPM, News | DXFD | 10 KW | Cotabato City |
| 94.7 FM | TM FM Cotabato | Amapola Broadcasting System | Islamic, News, Talk | —N/a | 5 KW | Cotabato City |
| 95.9 FM | Radyo Natin Cotabato | MBC Media Group | Community radio | DXTC | 5 KW | Cotabato City |
| 97.7 FM | Gabay Radio Cotabato | Bangsamoro Media Productions | Islamic radio, News, Public Affairs, Talk | —N/a | 5 KW | Cotabato City |
| 99.5 FM | Layag FM | Kalayaan Broadcasting System | Community, Islamic | —N/a | 5 KW | Datu Blah T. Sinsuat |
| 102.1 FM | Juander Radyo Cotabato | Rizal Memorial Colleges Broadcasting Corporation (operated by RSV Broadcasting Network) | Contemporary MOR, News, Talk | DXDO | 5 kW | Cotabato City |
| 105.3 FM | Radyo Bandera Cotabato | Allied Broadcasting Center, operated by Bandera News Philippines | Contemporary MOR, News, Talk | DXJN | 5 KW | Cotabato City |
| 105.5 FM | Upi For Peace | Presidential Broadcast Service (operated by Community Education Media Council) | Community radio | DXUP | 3 KW | Upi |
| 106.9 FM | Radyo Gandingan | Far East Broadcasting Company | News, Public Affairs, Talk, Religion | DXGR | 5 KW | Cotabato City |
| 107.3 FM | Magnet FM Cotabato | SKIA Broadcasting Network | Contemporary MOR, News, Talk | DXMM | 5 kW | Sultan Kudarat |
| 107.7 FM | Prime FM Cotabato | Prime Broadcasting Network | News, Talk, Music | —N/a | 5 KW | Cotabato City |

== Maguindanao del Sur ==
| Frequency | Name | Company | Format | Call Sign | Power | Location Covered |
|---|---|---|---|---|---|---|
| 96.1 FM | DXRB 96.1 | Kalayaan Broadcasting System, Inc. | Community radio | DXRB | 1 KW | Datu Saudi Ampatuan |
| 104.9 FM | DX Lake Buluan | Community Media Education Council | Community radio | DXLB | 1 KW | Datu Saudi Ampatuan |

== Tawi Tawi ==
=== AM stations ===
| Frequency | Name | Company | Format | Call Sign | Power | Location Covered |
|---|---|---|---|---|---|---|
| 549 AM | DXGD 549 | Sulu-Tawi Tawi Broadcasting Foundation | Community Radio, Islamic Radio | DXGD | 1 KW | Bongao |

=== FM stations ===
| Frequency | Name | Company | Format | Call Sign | Power | Location Covered |
|---|---|---|---|---|---|---|
| 90.9 FM | Radyo Natin Bongao | MBC Media Group | Community Radio | DXFB | 1 KW | Bongao |
| 94.1 FM | Radyo Kasannangan | National Nutrition Council (operated by the Municipal Government of Del Carmen; part of the Nutriskwela Community Radio network) | Community Radio | DXNH | 1 KW | Bongao |
| 99.1 FM | Radyo Suwara Sunlight FM | —N/a | community radio, islamic radio | DXSL | 5 KW | Bongao |
| 104.7 FM | Radyo Pilipinas | Presidential Broadcast Service | news, public affairs, talk | DXDC | 5 KW | Bongao |
