= DWCN =

DWCN may refer to:

- DWCN (Cagayan), an FM radio station broadcasting in Tuguegarao, branded as Magik FM
- DWCN (Daet), an FM radio station broadcasting in Daet, branded as Radyo Pilipinas
