= Radio in the Philippines =

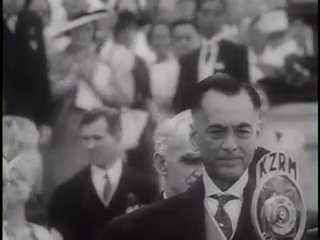
Philippine Commonwealth President Manuel L. Quezon speaking into a microphone from radio station KZRM at his first inauguration on November 15, 1935.

Radio broadcasting in the Philippines existed since the 1920s, and has a strong following. Estimates on the number or radio stations range from 1,200 to 1,500.

== Overview ==
Radio communications in the Philippines is regulated by the National Telecommunications Commission (NTC), which licenses broadcasters and regulates broadcasting. Broadcasters also require a 25-year congressional franchise to operate stations and transmitters, which dates from the American colonial era under Act No. 3846 (Radio Control Act).

Over-the-air radio broadcasting in the Philippines mostly belongs to the AM and FM bands. The AM broadcast band in the Philippines is on 531–1701 kHz with 9 kHz spacing (530–1700 kHz with 10 kHz spacing from the American colonial era and post-independence up to 1978), and is predominantly used for news and public service broadcasting. The FM band is the most commonly used broadcast band, with most music radio stations in the Philippines broadcasting in that band. Shortwave broadcasting is primarily used for state-owned or religious broadcasts targeted overseas. Internet radio also exists, mostly carrying live digital feeds of over-the-air stations as well as Internet-only stations, primarily marketed toward niche audiences and overseas Filipinos. The Philippines has not adopted a standard for digital radio, but several stations especially in Mega Manila have adopted HD Radio technology to provide digital simulcasts of their analog feed or to broadcast high-definition broadcasts of sister stations. Most radio broadcasts come from commercial broadcasters such as MBC Media Group, Radio Mindanao Network (RMN) and GMA Network; the remainder are operated by state-owned broadcasters such as the Presidential Broadcasting Service (PBS), and religious broadcasters such as the Catholic Media Network (CMN) and the Far East Broadcasting Company (FEBC).

=== Call signs ===
All AM and FM stations in the Philippines are assigned unique four-letter call signs by the NTC. Call signs used for AM and FM broadcasters begin with DW, DX, DY and DZ, with DW mostly used on stations in Luzon, DX in Mindanao and DY in Visayas (as well as parts of Masbate, Palawan and Pangasinan). During the American colonial era from 1920 to 1940, all Philippine stations were assigned call signs beginning with KZ; the present assignment was adopted post-independence with Philippine stations assigned the DU-DZ ITU prefix. Letters used on call signs are usually chosen to refer to the station's owner, location or slogan. While many AM stations still use their call signs as primary identification (e.g. DZBB, DWPM, DZRH, DWIZ), most others choose to use easily recognizable brands and slogans to identify themselves. Call signs are not usually mentioned in regular station identification, but are mentioned during a station's sign-on and sign-off sequence.

=== Formats ===
Radio format terminology used in the Philippines usually follows North American nomenclature. AM stations mostly broadcast in news, talk, public service, community radio and religious formats. FM stations predominantly broadcast music, usually in adult contemporary (AC), contemporary hit radio (top 40/CHR) and classic hits, but the FM band has also seen use by major news/talk and community radio networks, notably MBC's Radyo Natin, Brigada Mass Media Corporation's Brigada News FM, TV5's True FM, Radyo Bandera, Y2H Broadcasting Network's XFM and Aliw Broadcasting Corporation's DWIZ News FM (in regional areas).

==== Masa/contemporary MOR format ====
One notable Philippine radio format is masa (mass-based) or "contemporary middle-of-the-road (MOR)", a variation of the soft adult contemporary format with full-service radio elements and mostly broadcasts in Tagalog. It was introduced in the late 1990s during the Joseph Estrada administration and is associated with national networks and brands such as Love Radio and Yes FM by the MBC Media Group, iFM by Radio Mindanao Network, Star FM by Bombo Radyo Philippines, Brigada News FM of Brigada Mass Media Corporation, 99.5 XFM Manila of Y2H Broadcasting Network and Spirit FM by the Catholic Media Network; DWLS, the flagship FM radio station owned by GMA Network through its subsidiary RGMA Network, previously aired under The Giant WLS FM and later Campus Radio WLS FM banners with a mostly English-language Top 40 format, but switched to the masa format in a bid to appeal to a wider audience. The FM-based news/talk networks Brigada News FM and Radyo Bandera, as well as the community radio network Radyo Natin also carries masa-formatted music programming during off-peak hours when not broadcasting news and talk programming.

Masa- or contemporary MOR-formatted stations core music programming is a mix of both Filipino (OPM) and foreign contemporary and classic adult contemporary music from the 1970s to present, with the addition of variety popular music played on blocktime programs at certain days and time periods (e.g. dance music, rock and top 40 on morning and afternoon drive times, and oldies and classic hits on Sundays). Such stations usually have live talk, call-ins and drama programming, usually in Tagalog or regional languages.

== History ==
Radio in the Philippines started in June 1922 with the establishment of KZKZ (AM) in Manila, Philippines by Henry Herman Sr., owner of the Electrical Supply Company in Manila. Henry Herman was an American and a former soldier who came to the Philippines to fight in the Philippine–American War. He stayed in the Philippines after he was discharged.

This was not the first test however. Archives suggest that in 1922, an American woman named Mrs. Redgrave used a five-watt transmitter for a test broadcast from Nichols Field (now Villamor Airbase). This test is possibly the first radio broadcast in Asia.

Henry Herman's station originally broadcast using a 5-watt transmitter. In 1924, it boosted its power to 100 watts. On October 4, 1924, Henry Herman transferred KZKZ's ownership to the Radio Corporation of the Philippines (RCP), which he himself organized. In 1926 the company began to work on constructing two of the largest radio stations in Asia with the idea of maintaining direct Manila-San Francisco service.

In 1929, RCP launched KZRC in Cebu broadcasting with a 100-watt transmitter, but was later sold to store owner Isaac Beck. It is now DYRC owned by the Manila Broadcasting Company.

Early on, all radio programs were in English. This was the American colonial era in the Philippines. Most shows resembled American shows, even copying sponsorship.

Radio was unregulated until 1931 when the Radio Control Board was established under the Insular Government.

Upon the declaration of martial law in 1972, the dictatorship of Ferdinand Marcos shut down and took over radio stations and other media organizations. Only media outlets owned by cronies were allowed to operate, such as Kanlaon Broadcasting System owned by Marcos crony Roberto Benedicto. Other media outlets were later allowed to operate under heavy censorship. The emergence of alternative media outlets would eventually play a role in the downfall of the dictatorship during the 1986 People Power Revolution.

The current oldest continuously operating radio station is DZRB-AM. Another old station would be DZRH, started as KZRH.

Radio was also instrumental in the development of Filipino pop music with the government and broadcaster associations instituting local content quotas on radio from the 1970s. In 1973, Filipino AM radio stations were required to play at least 50% Filipino music, including cover versions of foreign songs by Filipino artists. By 1977, the Kapisanan ng mga Brodkaster ng Pilipinas (KBP) required stations to play one Filipino song every hour.

== Broadcast code of the Philippines ==
The Philippine Broadcast Code was issued by the Kapisanan ng mga Brodkaster ng Pilipinas (KBP) in 2007, which sets standards of performance and ethical conduct for the broadcast of radio and television stations for KBP member broadcasters and organizations.

== Violence against journalists ==
Acts of violence against radio commentators and other members of the media are monitored by human rights organizations and media watchdogs, such as the Center for Media Freedom and Responsibility and the National Union of Journalists of the Philippines.

== See also ==
- Television in the Philippines
- Mass media in the Philippines
- List of radio stations in the Philippines
