= List of radio stations in the Cordillera Administrative Region =

The following is a list of NTC-licensed radio stations in the Cordillera Administrative Region of the Philippines. current as of 2024. The tables can be sorted by call sign, branding, frequency, location, owner, languages and radio format. Also included below are defunct radio stations and Internet-only stations.

== Radio stations ==
Call sign	Branding	Frequency	RDS ID	Power	Location	Owner	Languages	Format
DWBG	Big Sound FM Baguio	95.9 FM		5 kW	Baguio	Vanguard Radio Network	Tagalog, Ilocano	masa/contemporary MOR, OPM
DWDJ (DZRJ relay)	RJFM Baguio	91.1 FM		5 kW	Baguio	Rajah Broadcasting Network	English	adult hits
DWFR	Radyo Pilipinas Bontoc	972 AM		5 kW	Bontoc, Mountain Province	Presidential Broadcast Service	Tagalog, Ilocano	news/talk
DWGF	Radyo Natin Abra	95.3 FM		1 kW	Bangued, Abra	MBC Media Group	Tagalog, Ilocano	community radio (Radyo Natin), masa/contemporary MOR
DWHB	iFM Baguio	103.9 FM	iFM iDOL	10 kW	Baguio	Radio Mindanao Network	Tagalog	masa/contemporary MOR, OPM
DWIM	Star FM Baguio	89.5 FM		10 kW	Baguio	Bombo Radyo Philippines	Tagalog, Ilocano	masa/contemporary MOR, OPM
DWJL	Radyo Pilipinas Abra	102.9 FM		5 kW	Bangued, Abra	Presidential Broadcast Service	Tagalog, Ilocano	news/talk
DWLY	Cool 97.5	97.5 FM		5 kW	Baguio	UBC Global Media Ministries	English, Tagalog, Ilocano	Evangelical religious broadcasting, Contemporary Christian music
DWMB	Love Radio Baguio	95.1 FM		10 kW	Baguio	MBC Media Group	Tagalog	masa/contemporary MOR, OPM
DWMC	Radyo Natin Kalinga	103.7 FM		1 kW	Tabuk, Kalinga	MBC Media Group	Tagalog, Ilocano	community radio (Radyo Natin), masa/contemporary MOR
DWPF	Gimpong FM	92.1 FM		1 kW	Tabuk, Kalinga	Presidential Broadcast Service	Tagalog, Ilocano	community radio, masa/contemporary MOR
DWPH	Lamut FM	105.3 FM		1 kW	Lamut, Ifugao	Presidential Broadcast Service (operated by Municipality of Lamut)	Tagalog, Ilocano	community radio
DWRA	Barangay LS Baguio	92.7 FM	1.Barangay 2. 92.7	10 kW	Baguio	GMA Network	Tagalog, Ilocano	masa/contemporary MOR
DWSK	K-Lite Baguio	96.7 FM		5 kW	Baguio	Beta Broadcasting System	English	adult top 40
DWSP (DZRH relay)	DZRH Baguio	612 AM		10 kW	Itogon, Benguet	MBC Media Group	Tagalog	news/talk
DWSW	Radyo Sagada	104.7 FM		1 kW	Sagada	National Council of Churches in the Philippines	Tagalog, Ilocano	community radio
DWUB	Z Radio	98.7 FM	Z RADIO	5 kW	Baguio	Sphere Entertainment, Inc.	Tagalog, Ilocano	masa/contemporary MOR, OPM, news/talk
DWWM	Spirit FM Abra	96.9 FM		5 kW	Bangued, Abra	Catholic Media Network	Tagalog, Ilocano	masa/contemporary MOR, Roman Catholic religious broadcasting
DZBM (DWBM relay)	Brigada News FM Baguio	105.1 FM		10 kW	Baguio	Baycomms Broadcasting Corporation (operated by Brigada Mass Media Corporation)	Tagalog	masa/contemporary MOR, OPM, news/talk
DZBS	Radyo Ronda Baguio	1368 AM		2.5 kW	Baguio	Radio Philippines Network	Tagalog, Ilocano	news/talk
DZEQ	Radyo Pilipinas Baguio	93.7 FM		1 kW	Baguio	Presidential Broadcast Service	Tagalog, Ilocano	news/talk
DZLL	MemoRieS FM Baguio	107.1 FM		5 kW	Baguio	Radio Mindanao Network (operated by Primax Broadcasting Network)	English	classic hits
DZNA	Radyo Kabinnulig Lagangilang	99.9 FM		300 W	Lagangilang, Abra	National Nutrition Council (operated by Abra State Institute of Science & Technology)	Tagalog, Ilocano	community radio (Nutriskwela Community Radio)
DZNC-FM	Radyo Kiphodan Lagawe	91.1 FM		300 W	Lagawe, Ifugao	National Nutrition Council (operated by Municipality of Lagawe)	Tagalog, Ilocano	community radio (Nutriskwela Community Radio)
DZNM	Radyo Kataguwan Bauko	97.3 FM		300 W	Bauko, Mountain Province	National Nutrition Council (operated by Municipality of Bauko)	Tagalog, Ilocano	community radio (Nutriskwela Community Radio)
DZNQ	Radyo Kasaranay Luna	96.7 FM		300 W	Luna, Apayao	National Nutrition Council (operated by Apayao State College)	Tagalog, Ilocano	community radio (Nutriskwela Community Radio)
DZNR	Radyo Kasalip Pasil	96.7 FM		300 W	Pasil, Kalinga	National Nutrition Council (operated by Municipality of Pasil)	Tagalog, Ilocano	community radio (Nutriskwela Community Radio)
DZPA	Radyo Totoo Abra	873 AM		5 kW	Bangued	Catholic Media Network	Tagalog, Ilocano	Roman Catholic religious broadcasting
DZRK	Radyo Pilipinas Tabuk	1323 AM		5 kW	Tabuk, Kalinga	Presidential Broadcast Service	Tagalog, Ilocano	news/talk
DZVD	Radyo Natin Buguias	100.7 FM		1 kW	Buguias, Benguet	MBC Media Group	Tagalog, Ilocano	community radio (Radyo Natin)
DZVK	Radyo Natin Banaue	101.7 FM		1 kW	Banaue, Ifugao	MBC Media Group	Tagalog, Ilocano	community radio (Radyo Natin), masa/contemporary MOR
DZVL	Radyo Natin Bontoc	100.9 FM		1 kW	Bontoc, Mountain Province	MBC Media Group	Tagalog, Ilocano	community radio (Radyo Natin), masa/contemporary MOR
DZWR	99.9 Country	99.9 FM	COUNTRY	5 kW	Baguio	Catholic Media Network	Tagalog, Ilocano	country, Roman Catholic religious broadcasting
DZWT	Radyo Totoo Baguio	540 AM		10 kW	Baguio	Catholic Media Network	Tagalog, Ilocano	Roman Catholic religious broadcasting
DZWX	Bombo Radyo Baguio	1035 AM		10 kW	Baguio	Bombo Radyo Philippines	Tagalog, Ilocano	news/talk
DZYB (DWFM relay)	FMR Baguio	102.3 FM		10 kW	Baguio	Nation Broadcasting Corporation (operated by Philippine Collective Media Corporation)	Tagalog	masa/contemporary MOR, OPM
DZYS	Easy Rock Baguio	91.9 FM		5 kW	Baguio	MBC Media Group	English	soft AC, OPM

== Defunct radio stations ==
• FM Radio Baguio
