= 1017 AM =

AM radio frequency

The following radio stations broadcast on AM frequency 1017 kHz:

== China ==
- CNR Ethnic Minority Radio in Changchun (during 14:00-19:00, using Korean)
- GRT News Radio

== Italy ==
- "Amica Radio Veneta" at Vigonza, province of Padova, Veneto (transmits AM stereo)

== Philippines ==
- DWLC-AM, in Lucena City as Radyo Pilipinas
- DXSN-AM, in Surigao as Radyo Magbalantay
- DXRR-AM, in Davao as Radyo Rapido

== Tonga ==
- A3Z
