= DXGO =

DXGO may refer to:

- DXGO-AM, an AM radio station broadcasting in Davao City, branded as Aksyon Radyo
- DXGO-FM, an FM radio station broadcasting in Kidapawan, branded as Dream FM
