= 954 AM =

AM radio frequency

The following radio stations broadcast on AM frequency 954kHz.

== Australia ==
- 2UE at Pyrmont, New South Wales

== China ==
- Hainan News Radio in Hainan

== Japan ==
- JOKR, master station at Tokyo.

== Philippines ==
- DZEM in Quezon City
- DWFB in Laoag
