= DYES =

DYES may refer to:

- DYES-AM, an AM radio station broadcasting in Borongan, branded as Radyo Pilipinas
- DYES-FM, an FM radio station broadcasting in Cebu City, branded as Easy Rock
