= DXDX =

DXDX may refer to the following Philippine radio stations:

- DXDX-AM, an AM radio station broadcasting in General Santos, Philippines, branded as Radyo Ronda
- DXDX-FM, an FM radio station broadcasting in Iligan, Philippines, branded as Radyo Pilipinas
