= DWCK (Puerto Princesa) =

Palawan Island Network
Puerto Princesa; Philippines
- Broadcast area: Palawan
- Frequency: 96.7 MHz
- Branding: 96.7 Palawan Island Network

Programming
- Language: Filipino
- Format: Community radio
- Affiliations: Presidential Broadcast Service

Ownership
- Owner: Government of Palawan

History
- First air date: July 25, 2024

Technical information
- Licensing authority: NTC
- Power: 2 kW

96.7 Palawan Island Network (DWCK 96.7 MHz) is an FM station owned and operated by the Government of Palawan. Its studio and transmitter are located at Provincial Disaster Risk Reduction and Management Office, Brgy. Irawan, Puerto Princesa.
