= DYLL =

DYLL may refer to:

- DYLL-AM, an AM radio station broadcasting in Iloilo City, branded as Radyo Pilipinas
- DYLL-FM, an FM radio station broadcasting in Cebu City, branded as Energy FM
