= DYPH =

DYPH may refer to:

- DYPH-AM, an AM relay station of DZRH broadcasting in Puerto Princesa
- DYPH-FM, an FM radio station broadcasting in Tolosa, Leyte, branded as Radyo Kidlat
