= DYDC =

Radio station in Leyte, Philippines

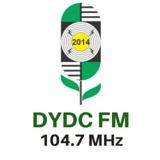
- Baybay; Philippines
- Broadcast area: Baybay and surrounding areas
- Frequency: 104.7 MHz
- Branding: DYDC 104.7

Programming
- Languages: Baybay, Filipino, English
- Format: Campus Radio, Community Radio
- Affiliations: Presidential Broadcast Service

Ownership
- Owner: Visayas State University

History
- First air date: 1982 (on AM); June 9, 2014 (on FM)
- Former call signs: DYAC (1982–2013)
- Former frequencies: 1449 kHz (1982–2013)
- Call sign meaning: Development Campus

Technical information
- Licensing authority: NTC
- Power: 100 watts

DYDC (104.7 FM) is a low-power radio station owned and operated by the Visayas State University. Its studios are located at the 2nd Floor, ADE Bldg., Visayas State University, Brgy. Pangasugan, Baybay. DYDC operates Weekdays from 7 am to 5 pm on terrestrial radio and online 24 hours daily via Zeno Radio.

The station serves as a training ground for community broadcasting and Development communication students of the Visayas State University.

== History ==
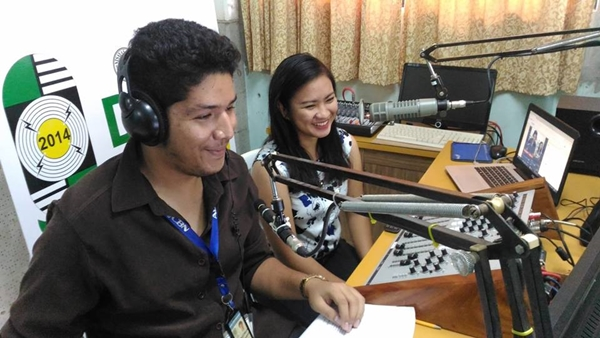
A Development Communication Community Broadcasting major (left) is being trained by the DYDC-FM staff on a live on-air music program.

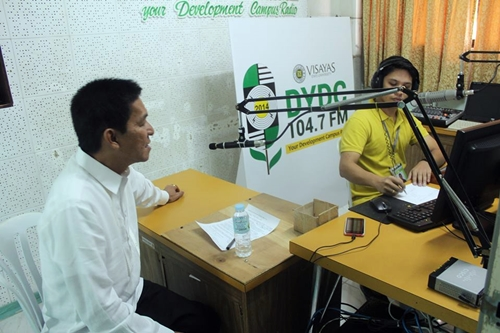
VSU President Dr. Edgardo E. Tulin (left) interviewed by Buen Andrade as guest of the weekly radio program Campus Talk.

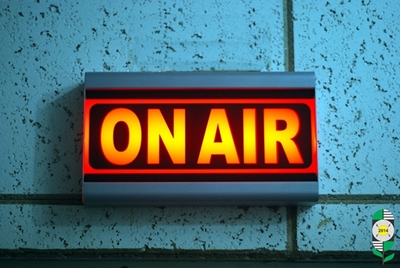
The "On-Air" Sign of DYDC-FM.

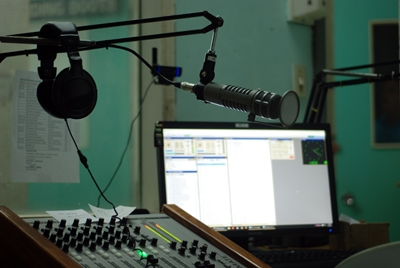
The broadcasting equipment at the Announcer's Booth of DYDC-FM.

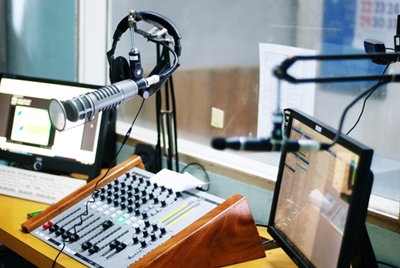
The broadcasting equipment at the Announcer's Booth of DYDC-FM.

DYDC was established in 1982 on AM with a frequency of 1449 kHz. Back then, it could receive signal from the major parts of Western Leyte, Eastern Visayas, parts of Northern Mindanao, and Southern Luzon. The station's various developmental programs in agriculture like the school-on-the-air has benefited several farmers. It initially operated 12 hours a day: from 7 am to 7 pm. In 2013, it ceased operations after its transmitter was damaged by Typhoon Haiyan.

In the rebuilding efforts following the devastation, the Commission on Higher Education granted VSU P1 million pesos for the repair of the station. On June 9, 2014, it was relaunched, this time on FM in response to the listeners’ survey which showed that most people listen to FM than AM radio.
