= DYOG =

Radyo Pilipinas Calbayog (DYOG)
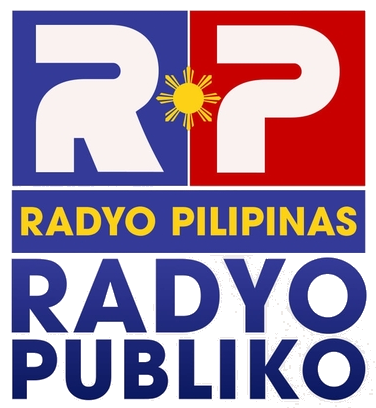
- Calbayog; Philippines
- Broadcast area: Northern Samar
- Frequency: 882 kHz
- Branding: Radyo Pilipinas

Programming
- Languages: Waray, Filipino
- Format: News, Public Affairs, Talk, Government Radio
- Network: Radyo Pilipinas

Ownership
- Owner: Presidential Broadcast Service

History
- First air date: August 21, 1982
- Former call signs: DYJR

Technical information
- Licensing authority: NTC
- Power: 5,000 watts

DYOG (882 AM) Radyo Pilipinas is a radio station owned and operated by Presidential Broadcast Service. The station's studio is located in Butel Bldg., Calbayog.
