= DXQA =

Radio station in Siargao City, Philippines

Radyo Kidlat Siargao (DXQA)
Dapa; Philippines
- Broadcast area: Siargao
- Frequency: 98.5 MHz
- Branding: 98.5 Radyo Kidlat

Programming
- Languages: Surigaonon, Filipino
- Format: Community Radio
- Network: Radyo Kidlat
- Affiliations: Presidential Broadcast Service

Ownership
- Owner: Siargao Electric Cooperative

History
- First air date: June 28, 2021

Technical information
- Licensing authority: NTC
- Power: 1,000 watts

DXQA (98.5 FM), broadcasting as 98.5 Radyo Kidlat, is a radio station owned and operated by Siargao Electric Cooperative (SIARELCO). The station's studio and transmitter are located in Brgy. Catabaan, Dapa, Surigao del Norte.
