= DWJS-AM =

Radio station in Legazpi, Philippines

Radyo Pilipinas Albay (DWJS)
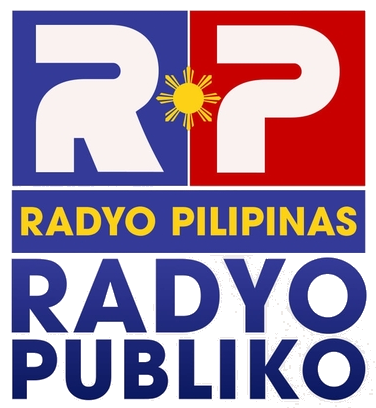
- Legazpi; Philippines
- Broadcast area: Albay and surrounding areas
- Frequency: 621 kHz
- Branding: Radyo Pilipinas

Programming
- Languages: Albayanon, Filipino
- Format: News, Public Affairs, Talk, Government Radio

Ownership
- Owner: Presidential Broadcast Service

History
- First air date: 1997 (original); April 6, 2016 (relaunch)
- Former call signs: DZBU (1997–2003)
- Former frequencies: 1368 kHz (1997–2003)
- Call sign meaning: Joey Salceda

Technical information
- Licensing authority: NTC
- Power: 10,000 watts

Links
- Website: www.pbsradio.ph

DWJS (621 AM) Radyo Pilipinas is a radio station owned and operated by the Presidential Broadcast Service. The station's studio and transmitter are located at Lignon Hill, Legazpi, Albay.
