= DWDF =

Radio station in Catanduanes, Philippines

Radyo Pilipinas Catanduanes (DWDF)
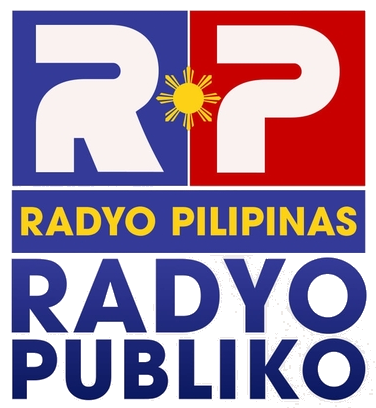
- Virac; Philippines
- Broadcast area: Catanduanes, parts of Camarines Sur
- Frequency: 94.3 MHz
- Branding: Radyo Pilipinas

Programming
- Languages: Bicolano, Filipino
- Format: News, Public Affairs, Talk Government Radio

Ownership
- Owner: Presidential Broadcast Service

History
- First air date: October 24, 1991
- Former call signs: DZVC (1991-2016)
- Former frequencies: 621 kHz (1991–2009); 1224 kHz (2009-2016)

Technical information
- Licensing authority: NTC
- Power: 5,000 watts

Links
- Website: www.pbsradio.ph

DWDF (94.3 FM) Radyo Pilipinas is a radio station owned and operated by the Presidential Broadcast Service. Its studios & transmitter are located inside the Catanduanes State University campus, Brgy. Calatagan, Virac, Catanduanes.
