= DXPH =

Radio station in Dinagat Islands, Philippines

Mystical FM (DXPH)
- San Jose; Philippines
- Broadcast area: Dinagat Islands, Surigao City
- Frequency: 98.9 MHz
- Branding: 98.9 Mystical FM

Programming
- Languages: Surigaonon, Filipino
- Format: Community radio
- Affiliations: Presidential Broadcast Service

Ownership
- Owner: Dinagat Islands Provincial Information Office

History
- First air date: April 2019
- Call sign meaning: Philippines

Technical information
- Licensing authority: NTC
- Power: 5,000 watts

DXPH (98.9 FM), broadcasting as 98.9 Mystical FM, is a radio station in the Philippines owned and operated by the Government of Dinagat Islands through its Provincial Information Office. The station's studio and transmitter are located at the Annex Bldg., Provincial Capitol, Brgy. Cuarenta, San Jose, Dinagat Islands. It serves as a community radio station of Dinagat Islands.
