= DXVL =

Radio station in North Cotabato, Philippines

DXVL (Kool FM)
- Kabacan; Philippines
- Broadcast area: Central Cotabato, parts of Maguindanao
- Frequency: 94.9 MHz
- Branding: 94.9 Kool FM

Programming
- Languages: Cebuano, Filipino
- Format: Contemporary MOR, News, Talk
- Affiliations: Presidential Broadcast Service

Ownership
- Owner: Kabacan Municipal Government

History
- First air date: July 18, 2006

Technical information
- Licensing authority: NTC
- Power: 5,000 watts

Links
- Website: https://dxvl949.blogspot.com/

DXVL (94.9 FM), broadcasting as 94.9 Kool FM, is a radio station owned and operated by the Government of Kabacan. The station's studio and transmitter are located at the College of Arts and Sciences Building, USM Ave., Kabacan.
