= DXCT =

Radio station in Misamis Occidental, Philippines

Radyo Pilipinas Tangub (DXCT)
- Tangub; Philippines
- Broadcast area: Southern Misamis Occidental, parts of Lanao del Norte and Zamboanga del Sur
- Frequency: 106.5 MHz
- Branding: Radyo Pilipinas 106.5

Programming
- Languages: Cebuano, Filipino
- Format: News, Public Affairs, Talk, Government Radio
- Affiliations: Presidential Broadcast Service

Ownership
- Owner: City Government of Tangub

History
- First air date: September 25, 2007 (on AM); November 28, 2018 (on FM)
- Former call signs: DXJT (2007–2018)
- Former frequencies: 954 kHz (2007–2018)
- Call sign meaning: City of Tangub

Technical information
- Licensing authority: NTC
- Power: 5 kW

DXCT (106.5 FM) Radyo Pilipinas is a radio station owned and operated by the City Government of Tangub. Its studios and transmitter are located at Maloro Beach, Tangub.
