= DXSO =

Radyo Pilipinas Marawi (DXSO)
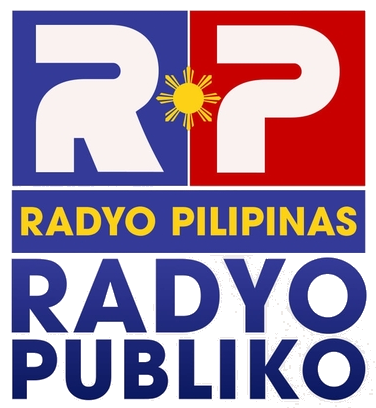
- Marawi; Philippines
- Broadcast area: Lanao del Norte and Lanao del Sur
- Frequency: 99.7 MHz
- Branding: Radyo Pilipinas 99.7

Programming
- Languages: Maranao, Cebuano
- Format: News, Public Affairs, Talk, Government Radio
- Affiliations: Presidential Broadcast Service

Ownership
- Owner: Marawi City Government

History
- First air date: September 29, 1964 (on AM); 2018 (on FM)
- Former call signs: DXSR (2005–2016)
- Former frequencies: 790 kHz (1964–1978); 774 kHz (1978–2016)

Technical information
- Licensing authority: NTC
- Power: 5,000 watts
- ERP: 10,000 watts

DXSO (99.7 FM) Radyo Pilipinas is a radio station owned and operated by the City Government of Marawi. The station's studio is located inside the Mindanao State University Campus, 4th St., Marawi.

The frequency formerly housed Salam Radio from its inception on July 14, 2005 to March 2016, when it was taken over by DXSO, which was formerly broadcast on 774 AM. In 2018, the City Government of Marawi took over the station's operations.
