= DYSL-AM =

Philippine radio station

Radyo Pilipinas Sogod (DYSL)
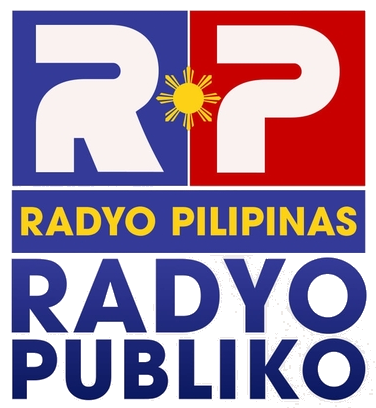
- Sogod; Philippines
- Broadcast area: Southern Leyte
- Frequency: 1170 kHz
- Branding: Radyo Pilipinas

Programming
- Languages: Filipino, Cebuano
- Format: News, Public Affairs, Talk, Government Radio
- Network: Radyo Pilipinas

Ownership
- Owner: Presidential Broadcast Service

History
- First air date: 1982
- Former frequencies: 1359 kHz
- Call sign meaning: Southern Leyte

Technical information
- Licensing authority: NTC
- Power: 5,000 watts
- Repeater: DYDD 104.7 MHz

DYSL (1170 AM & 104.7 FM) Radyo Pilipinas is a radio station owned and operated by Presidential Broadcast Service. The station's studio is located inside the Southern Leyte State University campus, Concepcion St., Brgy. San Roque, Sogod, Southern Leyte.
