= DXPB =

Radyo Pilipinas Molave (DXPB)
- Molave; Philippines
- Broadcast area: Zamboanga del Sur
- Frequency: 106.9 MHz
- Branding: MRadio 106.9 Radyo Pilipinas

Programming
- Languages: Filipino, Cebuano
- Format: News, Public Affairs, Talk, Government Radio
- Affiliations: Presidential Broadcast Service

Ownership
- Owner: Municipal Government of Molave

History
- First air date: November 8, 2012
- Call sign meaning: Philippine Broadcasting

Technical information
- Licensing authority: NTC
- Power: 5 kW

MRadio 106.9 (DXPB 106.9 MHz) is an FM station owned and operated by the Municipal Government of Molave. Its studios and transmitter are located at Molave Gym, Rizal Ave., Brgy. Madasigon, Molave, Zamboanga del Sur.
