= DYMR =

Radio station in Cebu City, Philippines

Radyo Pilipinas Cebu (DYMR)
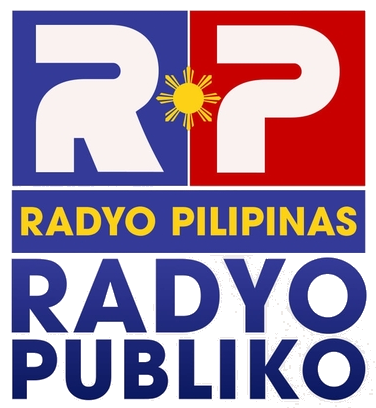
- Cebu City; Philippines
- Broadcast area: Central Visayas and surrounding areas
- Frequency: 576 kHz
- Branding: Radyo Pilipinas

Programming
- Languages: Cebuano, Filipino
- Format: News, Public Affairs, Talk, Government Radio
- Network: Radyo Pilipinas

Ownership
- Owner: Presidential Broadcast Service

History
- First air date: 1965
- Former call signs: DYCB (1965–1972); DYDY (1973–1986)
- Former frequencies: 570 kHz (1965–1972); 1410 kHz (1973–1978)
- Call sign meaning: Manuel Roxas

Technical information
- Licensing authority: NTC
- Class: B
- Power: 10,000 watts

Links
- Website: Radyo Pilipinas

DYMR (576 AM) Radyo Pilipinas is a radio station owned and operated by the Presidential Broadcast Service. Its studio is located inside the Cebu Technological University campus, M.J. Cuenco Ave. cor. R. Palma, St. Cebu City, and its transmitter is located at Brgy. Perrelos, Carcar.

It was established in 1965 as DYBC-AM on 570 kHz under Alto Broadcasting System (now ABS-CBN Corporation). It was later taken over by Banahaw Broadcasting Corporation as DYDY.
