= DWGQ =

Radyo Serbisyo (DWGQ)
- Gumaca; Philippines
- Broadcast area: Gumaca and surrounding areas
- Frequency: 93.3 MHz
- Branding: 93.3 Radyo Serbisyo

Programming
- Language: Filipino
- Format: News, Public Affairs, Talk, Government Radio
- Affiliations: Presidential Broadcast Service

Ownership
- Owner: Gumaca Communications and Management Services

History
- First air date: April 4, 2016
- Call sign meaning: Gumaca, Quezon

Technical information
- Licensing authority: NTC
- Power: 1 kW

Links
- Website: 933radyoserbisyo.weebly.com

93.3 Radyo Serbisyo (DWGQ 93.3 MHz) is an FM station owned and operated by Gumaca Communications and Management Services, the media arm of the Municipal Government of Gumaca. Its studios and transmitter are located at the 2nd Floor, Hernandez Bldg., Maharlika Highway, Brgy. Tabing Dagat, Gumaca.
