= DWPA =

Philippine radio station

El Oro Radyo (DWPA)
- Aroroy; Philippines
- Broadcast area: Masbate
- Frequency: 97.5 MHz
- Branding: El Oro Radyo 97.5

Programming
- Languages: Masbateño, Filipino
- Format: Community radio
- Affiliations: Presidential Broadcast Service

Ownership
- Owner: Aroroy Municipal Government

History
- First air date: December 11, 2012

Technical information
- Licensing authority: NTC
- Power: 1,000 watts

DWPA (97.5 FM), broadcasting as El Oro Radyo 97.5, is a radio station owned and operated by the Government of Aroroy. Its studios & transmitter are located along Don Pablo dela Rosa St., Brgy. Poblacion, Aroroy.
