= DXJS =

Radyo Pilipinas Tandag (DXJS)
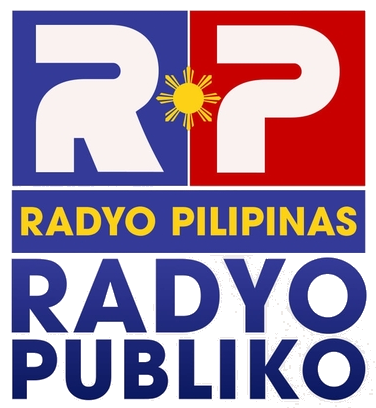
- Tandag; Philippines
- Broadcast area: Northern Surigao del Sur, parts of Agusan del Sur
- Frequency: 98.3 MHz
- Branding: Radyo Pilipinas

Programming
- Languages: Surigaonon, Filipino
- Format: News, Public Affairs, Talk, Government Radio
- Network: Radyo Pilipinas

Ownership
- Owner: Presidential Broadcast Service

History
- First air date: 1995
- Former frequencies: 837 kHz; 1170 kHz

Technical information
- Licensing authority: NTC
- Power: 5,000 watts

DXJS (98.3 FM) Radyo Pilipinas is a radio station owned and operated by the Presidential Broadcast Service. The station's studio is located near the Provincial Capitol, Brgy. Telaje, Tandag.

Last January 6, 2011, DXJS's transmitter tower was knocked down by heavy rains.

The station migrated to the FM band on 98.3 MHz since July 2026.
