= DYPJ =

Radio station in Bohol, Philippines

Radyo Kidlat Jagna (DYPJ)
- Jagna; Philippines
- Broadcast area: Bohol
- Frequency: 100.1 MHz
- Branding: 100.1 Radyo Kidlat

Programming
- Languages: Boholano, Filipino
- Format: Community radio
- Affiliations: Presidential Broadcast Service

Ownership
- Owner: Bohol 2 Electric Cooperative

History
- First air date: October 8, 2008
- Call sign meaning: Inverted as Jagna, Philippines

Technical information
- Licensing authority: NTC
- Power: 1,000 watts

DYPJ (100.1 FM), on-air as 100.1 Radyo Kidlat, is a radio station owned and operated by Bohol 2 Electric Cooperative (BOHECO 2). The station's studio and transmitter are located in Jagna Main Office, Bohol Circumferential Rd., Jagna.

== History ==
The station was established on October 8, 2008 under the management of Jagna's Community Radio Council as simply DYPJ. In December 2021, Bohol 2 Electric Cooperative (BOHECO 2) took over the station's operations and relaunched it under the Radyo Kidlat network.
