= DZVJ =

Radyo Natin Maddela (DZVJ)
Maddela; Philippines
- Broadcast area: Quirino
- Frequency: 101.7 MHz
- Branding: 101.7 Radyo Natin

Programming
- Language: Filipino
- Format: Community radio
- Network: Radyo Natin Network

Ownership
- Owner: MBC Media Group

History
- First air date: 1997 (as Hot FM)

Technical information
- Licensing authority: NTC
- Power: 1 kW

101.7 Radyo Natin (DZVJ 101.7 MHz) is an FM station owned and operated by MBC Media Group. Its studios and transmitter are located at Maddela.
