= DXDX-FM =

Radio station in Iligan, Philippines

Radyo Pilipinas Iligan (DXDX)
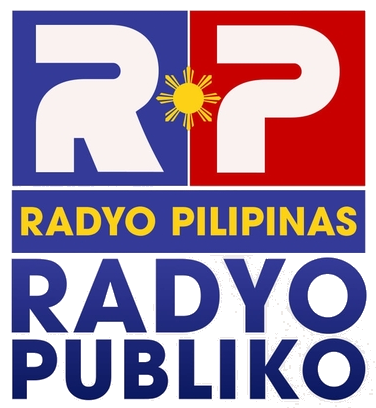
- Iligan; Philippines
- Broadcast area: Lanao del Norte, parts of Lanao del Sur
- Frequency: 105.5 MHz
- Branding: Radyo Pilipinas

Programming
- Languages: Filipino, Cebuano
- Format: News, Public Affairs, Talk, Government Radio
- Network: Radyo Pilipinas

Ownership
- Owner: Presidential Broadcast Service

History
- First air date: September 17, 2018
- Former call signs: DXSO
- Former frequencies: 99.7 MHz

Technical information
- Licensing authority: NTC
- Class: C, D and E
- Power: 5,000 watts
- ERP: 10,000 watts

DXDX (105.5 FM) Radyo Pilipinas is a radio station owned and operated by Presidential Broadcast Service. The station's studio is located in Iligan Medical Center College, San Miguel Village, Brgy. Pala-o, Iligan.

The frequency was formerly owned by the Manila Broadcasting Company under the Yes FM network from 2002 to 2012.
