= DYLL-AM =

Radio station in Iloilo City, Philippines

Radyo Pilipinas Iloilo (DYLL)
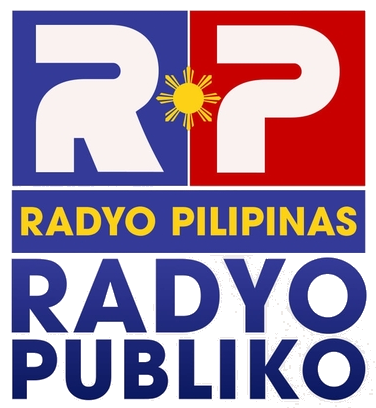
- Iloilo City; Philippines
- Broadcast area: Iloilo, Guimaras and surrounding areas
- Frequency: 585 kHz
- Branding: Radyo Pilipinas

Programming
- Languages: Hiligaynon, Filipino
- Format: News, Public Affairs, Talk, Government Radio
- Network: Radyo Pilipinas

Ownership
- Owner: Presidential Broadcast Service

History
- First air date: 1965
- Former call signs: DYCI (1965–1989)
- Former frequencies: 580 kHz (1965–1978); 594 kHz (1978–1996)

Technical information
- Licensing authority: NTC
- Class: B
- Power: 10,000 watts
- ERP: 15,000 watts

Links
- Webcast: DYLL Radyo Pilipinas LIVE Audio
- Website: PBS

DYLL (Pronounced as DY-double-L; 585 AM) Radyo Pilipinas is a radio station owned and operated by the Presidential Broadcast Service. Its studio is located at 5th floor, Student Services Building, Iloilo Science and Technology University, Burgos St., La Paz, Iloilo City, while its transmitter is located at Molo, Iloilo City.

The current call letters were formerly used by a Tacloban-based station owned by Eduardo Lopez & Co. from the 60s to the early 90s.
