= DXLB =

Philippine radio station

DXLB (DX Lake Buluan)
- Buluan; Philippines
- Broadcast area: Eastern Sultan Kudarat, eastern Maguindanao del Sur
- Frequency: 104.9 MHz
- Branding: DX Lake Buluan 104.9

Programming
- Languages: Filipino, Maguindanao
- Format: Community radio, Talk
- Affiliations: Presidential Broadcast Service

Ownership
- Owner: Community Media Education Council

History
- First air date: 2004
- Call sign meaning: Lake Buluan

Technical information
- Licensing authority: NTC
- Power: 1,000 watts

DXLB (104.9 FM), broadcasting as DX Lake Buluan 104.9, is a radio station owned and operated by the Community Media Education Council. Its studios and transmitter are located at Brgy. Poblacion Mopac, Buluan, Maguindanao del Sur. This serves as the community station for the Islam people in Buluan and southeastern Maguindanao del Sur.
