= DWUP =

Radio Wesleyan (DWUP)
- Cabanatuan; Philippines
- Broadcast area: Cabanatuan
- Frequency: 89.7 MHz
- Branding: Radio Wesleyan 89.7

Programming
- Languages: Filipino, English
- Format: College Radio

Ownership
- Owner: Wesleyan University Philippines

History
- First air date: 1972 (on AM); February 7, 2005 (on FM)
- Call sign meaning: Wesleyan University Philippines

Technical information
- Licensing authority: NTC
- Power: 10 watts

Links
- Website: FB Page

DWUP (89.7 FM), broadcasting as Radio Wesleyan 89.7, is a low-powered, educational radio station owned and operated by Wesleyan University Philippines. Its studio is located at the 5th floor of ComSci Bldg., WUP Campus, Sampaguita St., Mabini Extension Cabanatuan.

== History ==
The setting up of a Wesleyan radio station took all of three decades to realize.

In the early 1970s, the College of Technology under Dean Celestino Lucero managed to assemble an AM transmitter out of electronic parts donated by Clark Air Base in Pampanga. With the call letters DZWC (the last two letters standing for "Wesleyan College") the low-powered station went on test broadcast for a few weeks before a confluence of events prevented the project from fully taking off. First, a strong typhoon brought down the station's antenna. Unable to broadcast, the station failed to apply for a new radio frequency when the distance between the frequencies of all Philippine AM radio stations were reduced from 10 kilohertz to 9 kilohertz. The final blow came when Lucero unexpectedly died.

Flash forward to 2004. WU-P President Guillermo T. Maglaya, who was then barely a few months in office as officer-in-charge, showed keen interest upon learning of the long unrealized dream of Wesleyan to put up a radio station. Upon his suggestion, the College of Arts and Sciences through Ramon R. Valmonte, Mass Communication professor, submitted to him a new proposal for a university radio station that would serve, among others, as a training station for Mass Communication students. The proposal, dated July 26, 2004, was subsequently discussed and approved by the WU-P Board of Trustees. With Atty. Maglaya quietly doing most of the leg work, the DWUP-FM broadcast studio and tower at the fifth floor of the Computer Science Building were completed six months later to everyone's surprise. On February 7, 2005, the station began its test broadcast—30 years after the idea for a Radio Wesleyan was first conceived.

Radio Wesleyan, a unit under the Office of the University President, was formally inaugurated on July 1, 2005, coinciding with the commemoration of the 59th founding anniversary of Wesleyan University-Philippines and the installation of Atty. Maglaya as the University's fourth president.

On July 8, 2005, Radio Wesleyan's extension studio inside the Mass Communication Laboratory at the third floor of Mañacop Building started to operate, enabling the station to broadcast programs from two sites within the University campus and bolstering its broadcast training capabilities.

With DWUP-FM, Wesleyan University-Philippines became the first school in Central Luzon to own and operate its own radio station.
