= DZMQ =

Radio station in Dagupan, Philippines

Radyo Pilipinas Dagupan (DZMQ)
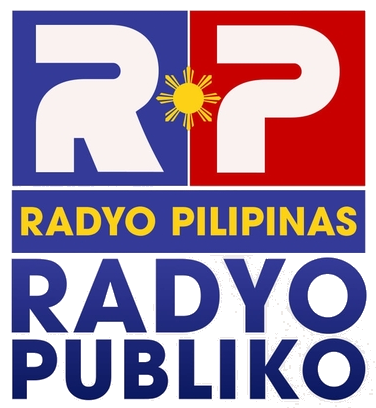
- Dagupan; Philippines
- Broadcast area: Pangasinan and surrounding areas
- Frequency: 576 kHz
- Branding: Radyo Pilipinas

Programming
- Languages: Pangasinense, Filipino
- Format: News, Public Affairs, Talk, Government Radio

Ownership
- Owner: Presidential Broadcast Service

History
- First air date: 1962
- Call sign meaning: Manuel Quezon

Technical information
- Licensing authority: NTC
- Power: 10,000 watts

Links
- Website: PBS

DZMQ (576 AM) Radyo Pilipinas is a radio station owned and operated by the Presidential Broadcast Service. The station's studio and transmitter are located in Brgy. Bonuan Binloc, Dagupan. It is the pioneer AM radio station in the province.
