= DWQP =

Philippine radio station

- Cabarroguis; Philippines
- Broadcast area: Quirino, parts of Nueva Vizcaya
- Frequency: 92.1 MHz
- Branding: 92.1 DWQP

Programming
- Languages: Ilocano, Filipino
- Format: Community radio
- Affiliations: Presidential Broadcast Service

Ownership
- Owner: Quirino Provincial Government

History
- First air date: 2015
- Call sign meaning: Quirino Province

Technical information
- Licensing authority: NTC
- Power: 1,000 watts

DWQP (92.1 FM) is a radio station owned and operated by the Government of Quirino. The station's studio and transmitter are located in Capitol Hills, Cabarroguis.
