= DWNP =

Radio station in Nueva Ecija, Philippines

UMFM (DWNP)
- Palayan; Philippines
- Broadcast area: Nueva Ecija
- Frequency: 106.5 MHz
- Branding: 106.5 UMFM

Programming
- Languages: Filipino, English
- Format: Contemporary MOR, OPM

Ownership
- Owner: Multipoint Broadcasting Network
- Sister stations: TV48

History
- First air date: 2017
- Call sign meaning: Inverted as Palayan, Nueva Ecija

Technical information
- Licensing authority: NTC
- Class: C, D, E
- Power: 5,000 watts

DWNP (106.5 FM), broadcasting as 106.5 UMFM, is a radio station owned and operated by Multipoint Broadcasting Network. The station's studio and transmitter are located in Palayan.
