= DWCN (Daet) =

Radio station in Daet, Philippines

Radyo Pilipinas CamNor (DWCN)
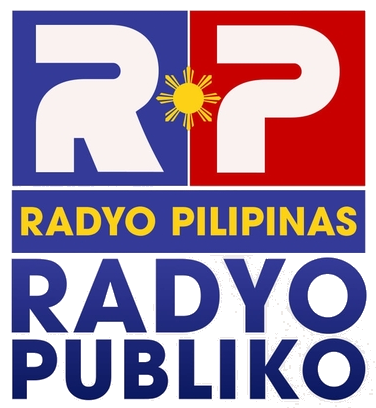
- Daet; Philippines
- Broadcast area: Camarines Norte
- Frequency: 96.9 MHz
- Branding: Radyo Pilipinas

Programming
- Languages: Bicolano, Filipino
- Format: News, Public Affairs, Talk, Government Radio
- Affiliations: Presidential Broadcast Service

Ownership
- Owner: Provincial Government of Camarines Norte

History
- Call sign meaning: Camarines Norte

Technical information
- Licensing authority: NTC
- Power: 3,000 watts
- Repeater: Labo: 89.7 MHz

DWCN (96.9 FM) Radyo Pilipinas is a radio station owned and operated by the Provincial Government of Camarines Norte. Its studios and transmitter are located at Brgy. III, Daet.
