= DWPE =

Radyo Pilipinas Tuguegarao (DWPE)
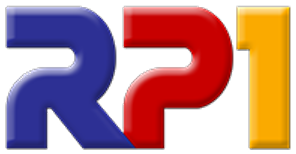
- Tuguegarao; Philippines
- Broadcast area: Northern Cagayan Valley and surrounding areas
- Frequency: 729 kHz
- Branding: Radyo Pilipinas

Programming
- Languages: Ilocano, Filipino
- Format: News, Public Affairs, Talk, Government Radio
- Network: Radyo Pilipinas

Ownership
- Owner: Presidential Broadcast Service

History
- First air date: 1978
- Call sign meaning: Philippine

Technical information
- Licensing authority: NTC
- Power: 10,000 watts

Links
- Website: PBS

DWPE (729 AM) Radyo Pilipinas is a radio station owned and operated by the Presidential Broadcast Service. Its studio is located at the Department of Agriculture Nursery Compound, Brgy. San Gabriel, Tuguegarao, while its transmitter is located at the Cagayan State University Carig Campus, Tuguegarao.
