= DYES-AM =

Philippine radio station

Radyo Pilipinas Borongan (DYES)
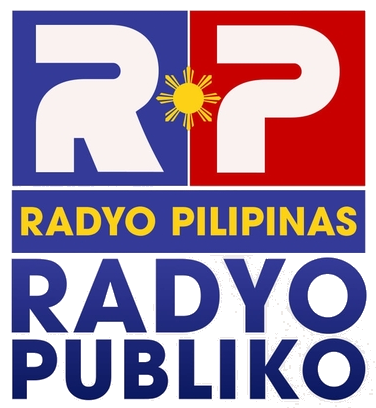
- Borongan; Philippines
- Broadcast area: Eastern Samar, parts of Samar
- Frequency: 657 kHz
- Branding: Radyo Pilipinas

Programming
- Languages: Waray, Filipino
- Format: News, Public Affairs, Talk, Religious Radio
- Network: Radyo Pilipinas

Ownership
- Owner: Presidential Broadcast Service

History
- First air date: August 2, 1989
- Call sign meaning: Eastern Samar

Technical information
- Licensing authority: NTC
- Power: 10,000 watts

DYES (657 AM) Radyo Pilipinas is a radio station owned and operated by Presidential Broadcast Service. The station's studio is located in the Capitol Site, Brgy., Alang-Alang, Borongan.
