= Radyo Pilipinas Baguio =

Radio station in Baguio, Philippines

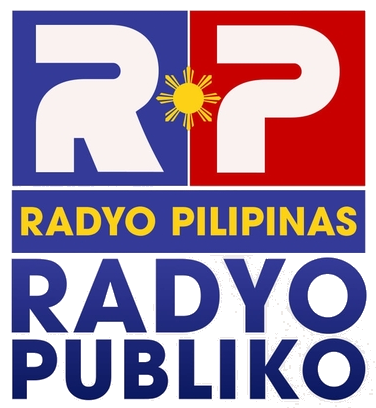
- Baguio; Philippines
- Broadcast area: Benguet, La Union and surrounding areas
- Frequency: 93.7 MHz
- Branding: Radyo Pilipinas

Programming
- Languages: Ilocano, Filipino
- Format: News, Public Affairs, Talk, Government Radio
- Network: Radyo Pilipinas

Ownership
- Owner: Presidential Broadcast Service

History
- First air date: 1965
- Former call signs: DZEQ (1965–2021)
- Former frequencies: 1510 kHz (1965–1978); 999 kHz (1978–2021)

Technical information
- Licensing authority: NTC
- Class: B
- Power: 1,000 watts

Links
- Webcast: DZEQ Radyo Pilipinas LIVE Audio
- Website: PBS

Radyo Pilipinas (93.7 FM) is a radio station owned and operated by Presidential Broadcast Service. Its studio and transmitter are located along Polo Field Rd., Brgy. Pacdal, Baguio.

== See also ==
- PTV 8 Cordillera
