= DXGO-FM =

Philippine radio station

Dream FM Kidapawan (DXGO)
- Kidapawan; Philippines
- Broadcast area: Eastern Cotabato and surrounding areas
- Frequency: 103.1 MHz
- Branding: 103.1 Dream FM

Programming
- Languages: Cebuano, Filipino
- Format: Community radio
- Affiliations: Presidential Broadcast Service

Ownership
- Owner: DepEd Kidapawan

History
- Former call signs: DXGM

Technical information
- Licensing authority: NTC
- Power: 5 kW

103.1 Dream FM (DXGO 103.1 MHz) is an FM station owned and operated by the Department of Education - Division of Kidapawan. Its studios and transmitter are located at Poblacion, Kidapawan.
