= Iligan Medical Center College =

Private college in Lanao del Norte, Philippines

- Medical
- Type: Private, Non-sectarian
- Established: 1975
- Affiliations: PACUCOA, Save Iligan Rivers Movement, Inc., COCOPEA
- President: Royce S. Torres, PhD
- Location: Iligan City, Lanao del Norte, Philippines; 8°13′53″N 124°14′57″E
- Campus: Urban
- Website: imcc.edu.ph
- Location in Mindanao Location in the Philippines

Iligan Medical Center College (IMCC) is a private, non-sectarian higher education institution in Iligan City, Philippines.

== History ==
In 1975, after witnessing what they perceived as inadequate medical care and services in the Philippines, five doctors founded what was originally named the Iligan Medical School of Nursing and Midwifery. The school had 37 students enrolled in the first year. It had only one building which served as both school and dormitory. The inaugural graduation was held in 1978. Despite struggling in the start, the school survived due to public involvement.

The school's name was later changed to Illigan Medical Center College. The college was expanded; more courses were offered, including medical technological, radiological, and other non-paramedical courses such as applied electronics, practical electricity, refrigeration and air-conditioning..

In the 1990s, there was a decrease in demand for paramedical graduates abroad, since schools overseas were producing their own healthcare workers and prioritized local job employment. To keep IMCC competitive, and possibly reduce the impact of this event, the institution diversified its course offering to include more non-paramedical courses, opening computer-related courses such as computer science, information technology, and information management. It also began to offer preschool, primary and secondary academic levels. Other courses such as hotel and restaurant management, tourism, and education are now also offered.

In 1995, the institute began planning to become a university. The graduate school was the initial venture, and that year IMCC started enrolling students for master's degree in Human Resource Management.

=== Founders ===
- Melchor B. Picardal, M.D., President, 1988–1994, Doctor of Medicine, Manila Central University
- Virgilio S. Rigor, SR., M.D., President, Doctor of Medicine, University of the Philippines
- Rodolfo R. Torres, M.D., President, 1993–1995, Doctor of Medicine, University of Santo Tomas
- Susano D. Lagtapon, M.D., First President, 1975–1987, Doctor of Medicine, University of Santo Tomas
- Teofilo F. Monterroyo Jr., M.D., Board of Director, Doctor of Medicine, University of the East

=== Deans ===
- Elizabeth Alagar, College of Nursing and Midwifery
- Miguel Elijah Bibera, College of Medical Technology
- Ma. Victoria Patrimonio, College of Radiologic Technology
- Ernesto Ilago, Graduate School
