= DWCQ =

Radyo Kidlat Zambales (DWCQ)
- Castillejos; Philippines
- Broadcast area: Southern Zambales, parts of Bataan
- Frequency: 98.3 MHz
- Branding: 98.3 Radyo Kidlat

Programming
- Language: Filipino
- Format: Community radio
- Affiliations: Presidential Broadcast Service

Ownership
- Owner: Zambales 2 Electric Cooperative

History
- First air date: May 7, 2021
- Call sign meaning: Carlos Quirino

Technical information
- Licensing authority: NTC
- Power: 1,000 watts

DWCQ (98.3 FM), broadcasting as 98.3 Radyo Kidlat, is a radio station owned and operated by Zambales 2 Electric Cooperative (ZAMECO 2). The station's studio and transmitter are located at ZAMECO 2 Main Office, National Highway, Brgy. Nagbunga, Castillejos. It is the first radio station owned by an electric cooperative.
