= DZRG =

RCFM (DZRG)
- San Antonio; Philippines
- Broadcast area: San Antonio and surrounding areas
- Frequency: 104.7 MHz
- Branding: 104.7 RCFM

Programming
- Language: Filipino
- Format: Community Radio
- Affiliations: Presidential Broadcast Service

Ownership
- Owner: Rainbow Connection Civic Group

History
- Former frequencies: 104.3 MHz
- Call sign meaning: Rainbow Connection Civic Group

Technical information
- Licensing authority: NTC
- Class: B
- Power: 1 kW
- ERP: 1.5 kW

104.7 RCFM (DZRG 104.7 MHz) is an FM station owned and operated by Rainbow Connection Civic Group. Its studios and transmitter are located at Commercial Building, National Highway, San Antonio, Zambales.
