= DWSB =

Radio station in Olongapo, Philippines

Subic Bay Radio (DWSB)
- Olongapo; Philippines
- Broadcast area: Zambales, Bataan, and surrounding areas
- Frequency: 89.5 MHz
- Branding: 89.5 Subic Bay Radio

Programming
- Languages: English, Filipino
- Format: Adult Top 40, Public Radio
- Affiliations: Presidential Broadcast Service

Ownership
- Owner: Subic Bay Metropolitan Authority

History
- First air date: January 1, 2007
- Call sign meaning: Subic Bay

Technical information
- Licensing authority: NTC
- Class: A and B
- Power: 5,000 watts
- ERP: 15,000 watts

Links
- Webcast: 89.5 Subic Bay Radio Live
- Website: 89.5 Subic Bay Radio Web

DWSB (89.5 FM), broadcasting as 89.5 Subic Bay Radio, is a radio station owned and operated by the Subic Bay Metropolitan Authority. The station's studio and transmitter are located at Bldg. N, Quezon Street, Subic Bay Freeport Zone, Olongapo.

== Overview ==
Established by the Subic Bay Metropolitan Authority (SBMA) jointly with Presidential Broadcast Service (PBS-BBS), 89.5 FM Subic Bay Radio is aimed to serve as a medium that will promote Subic Bay Freeport Zone as an investment and tourism haven, and at the same time provide radio services for the community of Subic Bay Freeport Zone and nearby areas.

On 2010, the station's live streaming was in full operation to serve the listeners online here and especially those abroad. Right now it is the only local radio station in Olongapo City and Subic Bay area to have live streaming features operating 24 hours a day.
