= DWLF =

Radio station in Lucena, Philippines

Radyo Pilipinas Lucena (DWLF)
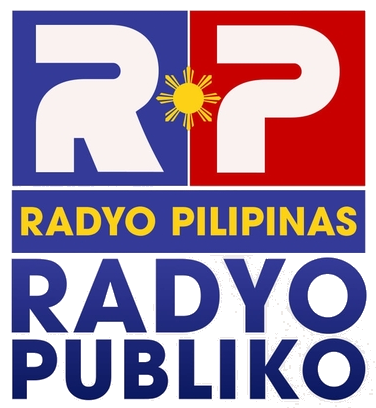
- Lucena; Philippines
- Broadcast area: Quezon and surrounding areas
- Frequency: 87.9 MHz
- Branding: Radyo Pilipinas

Programming
- Language: Filipino
- Format: News, Public Affairs, Talk, Government Radio
- Network: Radyo Pilipinas

Ownership
- Owner: Presidential Broadcast Service

History
- First air date: 1962
- Former call signs: DWCW (1962-1978); DZLC (1978-1989); DWLC (1989-2026)
- Former names: Progress Radio (1970s-1989); Radyo ng Bayan (1989-2017)
- Former frequencies: 1020 kHz (1962-1978); 1017 kHz (1978-2026)
- Call sign meaning: Lucena FM

Technical information
- Licensing authority: NTC
- Power: 10,000 watts

Links
- Website: PBS

DWLF (87.9 FM) Radyo Pilipinas is a radio station owned and operated by the Presidential Broadcast Service. Its studio is located at the 2nd Floor, Boy Scouts of the Philippines Bldg., Perez St., Brgy. 10, Lucena, and its transmitter is located at Brgy. Talipan, Pagbilao.

== History ==
The station was established in 1962 under the call letters DWCW. It was Owened by ABS-CBN Corporation. After the Martial Law was implemented in 1972, its ownership was transferred to the Banahaw Broadcasting Corporation. Subsequently, ownership was transferred to the Maharlika Broadcasting System (MBS), which operated under the government-controlled broadcasting network GTV Maharlika Broadcasting System.

In November 1978, DWCW transferred from 1020 kHz to 1017 kHz, in response to the adoption of the 9 kHz spacing on AM radio stations in the Philippines under the Geneva Frequency Plan of 1975 later Change to changed its call letters to DZLC.and started carrying the Progress Radio branding. .

In 1986, months into the Corazon Aquino presidency, the station became part of the reinstated Philippine Broadcasting Service under the Bureau of Broadcast Services.

In 1989,changed its call letters to DWLC and started carrying the Radyo ng Bayan branding.

In 2017, in line with PBS’s 70th anniversary celebration, the station started carrying the Radyo Pilipinas branding.

In August 2026, the station migrated to FM via 87.9 MHz.

Among the station's past personalities were the late Melo Acuña, Mike Toledo, Wendell S. Dionido, and Dindo Amparo.
