= DWCI =

Piddig; Philippines
- Broadcast area: Ilocos Norte and surrounding areas
- Frequency: 105.1 MHz
- Branding: 105.1 Adjo FM

Programming
- Languages: Ilocano, Filipino
- Format: Community Radio, Government Radio
- Affiliations: Presidential Broadcast Service

Ownership
- Owner: Piddig Municipal Government

History
- First air date: December 18, 2014

Technical information
- Licensing authority: NTC
- Power: 5,000 watts

DWCI (105.1 FM), broadcasting as 105.1 Adjo FM, is a radio station owned and operated by the Municipal Government of Piddig. The station's studio is located at the Municipal Hall Complex, Brgy. Anao, Piddig, Ilocos Norte. This serves as the community station of the town of Piddig.
