= DXUP =

- Upi; Philippines
- Broadcast area: Southern Maguindanao del Norte, parts of Maguindanao del Sur
- Frequency: 105.5 MHz
- Branding: DXUP 105.5

Programming
- Languages: Maguindanaon, Filipino
- Format: Community radio
- Affiliations: Presidential Broadcast Service

Ownership
- Owner: Community Media Education Council

History
- First air date: February 8, 2004
- Call sign meaning: Upi

Technical information
- Licensing authority: NTC
- Power: 1,000 watts
- ERP: 3,000 watts

Links
- Website: Website

DXUP (105.5 FM) is a radio station owned and operated by the Community Media Education Council. Its studios and transmitter are located along Rizal Blvd., Brgy. Nuro, Upi, Maguindanao del Norte. This serves as the community station for the town of Upi.
