= DYPH-FM =

Radio station in the Philippines

Radyo Kidlat Tolosa (DYPH)
- Tolosa; Philippines
- Broadcast area: Eastern Leyte
- Frequency: 90.3 MHz
- Branding: Radyo Kidlat 90.3 Light FM

Programming
- Languages: Waray, Filipino
- Format: Community radio
- Network: Radyo Kidlat
- Affiliations: Presidential Broadcast Service

Ownership
- Owner: Don Orestes Romualdez Electric Cooperative

History
- First air date: February 14, 2022
- Call sign meaning: Philippines

Technical information
- Licensing authority: NTC
- Power: 5,000 watts

DYPH (90.3 FM), broadcasting as Radyo Kidlat 90.3 Light FM, is a radio station owned and operated by Don Orestes Romualdez Electric Cooperative (DORELCO). The station's studio is located along National Hi-way, Brgy. San Roque, Tolosa, Leyte.
