= DZUL =

MY FM (DZUL)
- San Fernando; Philippines
- Broadcast area: La Union and surrounding areas
- Frequency: 104.3 MHz
- Branding: 104.3 MY FM

Programming
- Languages: Ilocano, Filipino
- Format: Contemporary MOR, OPM

Ownership
- Owner: Sea and Sky Broadcasting

History
- First air date: 1990
- Former names: Spirit FM (1990-2012)
- Call sign meaning: Inverted as La Union

Technical information
- Licensing authority: NTC
- Power: 5,000 watts

DZUL (104.3 FM), broadcasting as 104.3 MY FM, is a radio station owned and operated Sea and Sky Broadcasting. Its studios are located inside the Sea and Sky College campus, MacArthur Highway, Brgy. Pagdaraoan, San Fernando, La Union.

The station was formerly known as Spirit FM under the Diocese of San Fernando de La Union from 1990 to February 2012.
