= DZAG =

Philippine radio station

Radyo Pilipinas Agoo (DZAG)
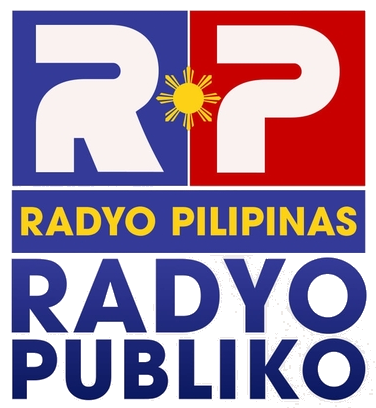
- Agoo; Philippines
- Broadcast area: La Union and surrounding areas
- Frequency: 97.1 MHz
- Branding: Radyo Pilipinas

Programming
- Languages: Ilocano, Filipino
- Format: News, Public Affairs, Talk, Government Radio
- Network: Radyo Pilipinas

Ownership
- Owner: Presidential Broadcast Service

History
- First air date: 1974
- Former frequencies: 1224 kHz
- Call sign meaning: Agoo

Technical information
- Licensing authority: NTC
- Power: 5,000 watts

Links
- Website: Official Website

DZAG (97.1 FM) Radyo Pilipinas is a radio station owned by the Presidential Broadcast Service. The station's studio and transmitter are located inside the Don Mariano Marcos Memorial State University campus, Dona Toribia Aspiras Rd., Agoo.
