= DWCN (Cagayan) =

Magik FM Tuguegarao (DWCN)
- Tuguegarao; Philippines
- Broadcast area: Cagayan and surrounding areas
- Frequency: 91.7 MHz
- Branding: 91.7 Magik FM

Programming
- Languages: Ibanag, Filipino
- Format: Contemporary MOR, OPM
- Network: Magik FM

Ownership
- Owner: Century Broadcasting Network

History
- First air date: 1990
- Call sign meaning: Cagayan

Technical information
- Licensing authority: NTC
- Power: 5 kW

91.7 Magik FM (DWCN 91.7 MHz) is an FM station owned and operated by Century Broadcasting Network. Its studios and transmitter are located at the 2nd Floor, M.E Guzman Bldg., Servando Liban St., Brgy. Balzain East, Tuguegarao.
