= DZDA =

Radyo Pangkaunlaran (DZDA)
Tuguegarao; Philippines
- Broadcast area: Cagayan and surrounding areas
- Frequency: 105.3 MHz
- Branding: DZDA 105.3 Radyo Pangkaunlaran

Programming
- Languages: Ibanag, Filipino
- Format: Community radio

Ownership
- Owner: Department of Agriculture

History
- First air date: June 2, 2017
- Call sign meaning: Department of Agriculture

Technical information
- Licensing authority: NTC
- Power: 5,000 watts

Links
- Website: DA Region 2 Website

DZDA (105.3 FM) Radyo Pangkaunlaran is a radio station owned and operated by the Department of Agriculture. Its studio and transmitter are located at the Regional Field Office grounds, Diversion Rd., Brgy. San Gabriel, Tuguegarao.
