= DWFB =

Radio station in Laoag, Philippines

Radyo Pilipinas Laoag (DWFB)
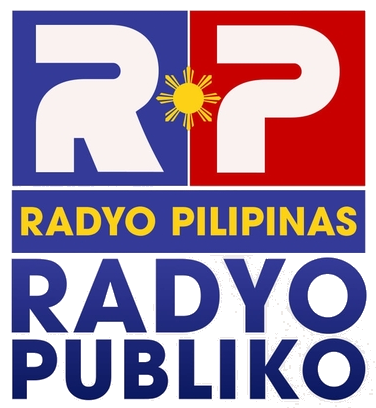
- Laoag; Philippines
- Broadcast area: Ilocos Norte and surrounding areas
- Frequency: 103.5 MHz
- Branding: Radyo Pilipinas

Programming
- Languages: Ilocano, Filipino
- Format: News, Public Affairs, Talk, Government Radio
- Network: Radyo Pilipinas

Ownership
- Owner: Presidential Broadcast Service

History
- First air date: 1974
- Former call signs: DWFB (1974–2024)
- Former frequencies: 940 kHz (1974–1978); 954 kHz (1978–2024)

Technical information
- Licensing authority: NTC
- Power: 5,000 watts

Links
- Website: PBS

DWFB (103.5 FM) Radyo Pilipinas is a radio station owned and operated by the government-controlled Presidential Broadcast Service. Its studios and offices are located at Mariano Marcos State University - College of Teacher Education Campus, Laoag, while its transmitter is located at Mariano Marcos State University - Main Campus, Batac.
