= Presidential Broadcast Service =

State-owned radio network in the Philippines

Presidential Broadcast Service – Bureau of Broadcast Services (PBS-BBS)
- Formerly: Philippine Broadcasting Service (1947–2023)
- Type: State agency
- Industry: Public broadcasting
- Predecessor: Bureau of Broadcasts (1972–1986)
- Founded: September 12, 1947 (radio broadcasts); June 15, 1961 (television broadcasts)
- Founders: Francisco "Kiko" Trinidad
- Headquarters: PIA/Media Center Building, Visayas Ave., Brgy. Vasra, Diliman, Quezon City, Philippines
- Key people: Lino Cayetano (Secretary, Presidential Communications Office); Alan Allanigue (OIC Bureau Director/Head)
- Owner: Government of the Philippines (Presidential Communications Office)
- Number of employees: 545 (2025)
- Website: pbs.gov.ph

Radyo Pilipinas
- Type: Broadcast radio network
- Broadcast area: Philippines

Programming
- Languages: Filipino; English
- Format: News, public affairs, talk, government radio
- Affiliations: PTV

History
- Launch date: International: 1995; National: June 5, 2017
- Replaced: Radyo ng Bayan (1995–2017)

Coverage
- Availability: Nationwide (AM/FM, affiliate stations, and G Sat); Worldwide (shortwave)
- Stations: See list

Links
- Website: radyopilipinas.ph

Republika ni Juan
- Type: FM radio network
- Broadcast area: Philippines

Programming
- Languages: English, Filipino
- Format: Contemporary MOR, OPM, news

History
- Launch date: November 1, 2017
- Former names: FM1 (2017–2020); Republika FM1 (2020–2024); Republika (2024–2025)

Coverage
- Availability: Metro Manila, Metro Davao

The Capital
- Type: FM radio network
- Broadcast area: Philippines

Programming
- Language: English
- Format: Adult contemporary, OPM

History
- Launch date: February 2, 2017
- Former names: FM2 (2017–2020)

Coverage
- Availability: Nationwide

The Presidential Broadcast Service – Bureau of Broadcast Services (PBS-BBS; Filipino: Pampanguluhang Serbisyong Pambrodkast – Kawanihan ng mga Serbisyong Pambrodkast) is a state radio network owned by the Philippine government under the Presidential Communications Office (PCO).

PBS operates national radio brands: Radyo Pilipinas – Radyo Publiko, Sports Radio, Radyo Magasin, Republika ni Juan and The Capital, as well as international shortwave station Radyo Pilipinas World Service. PBS, along with its television network counterparts People's Television Network, Radio Philippines Network (20% minority-owned) and Intercontinental Broadcasting Corporation which forms the media arm of the PCO.

As one of the attached agencies of the OPS, the PBS-BBS receives funding from the General Appropriations Act (Annual National Budget) and sales from blocktimers and advertisers, among others.

== History ==
=== Commonwealth and Third Republic ===
On May 8, 1933, the United States-sponsored Insular Government established and operated radio station DZFM (then KZSO, later KZFM) in the Philippines on the frequency of 710 kilohertz with a power of 10,000 watts through the United States Information Service. In September 1946, two months after the restoration of Philippine independence thru the Treaty of Manila, KZFM was turned over to the Philippine government. With the transfer was born the Philippine Broadcasting Service (PBS), the second broadcasting organization after Manila Broadcasting Company (now MBC Media Group).

KZFM first operated under the Department of Foreign Affairs until it was transferred to the Radio Broadcasting Board (RBB), created by President Manuel Quezon on September 3, 1937. In 1947, an International Telecommunications Conference in Atlantic City, New Jersey, assigned the initial letters DU-DZ to replace K as the callsign prefixes for all radio stations in the Philippines. On January 1, 1952, the RBB was abolished to give way to the establishment of the Philippine Information Council (PIC) which assumed the function of the RBB, including the operation of DZFM. On July 1, 1952, after the PIC was abolished, DZFM and the Philippine Broadcasting Service (PBS) operated under the Office of the President. In 1959, they were both placed under the newly created Department of Public Information (DPI).

Years hence, the PBS acquired 13 more radio stations, one TV station it time-shared with two other organizations, and changed its name to Bureau of Broadcast Services. September 13 is marked as the anniversary of the PBS.

In the 1960s, PBS' radio network expanded to the key provinces with DZEQ in Baguio, DYMR in Cebu City, DYCI in Iloilo City, DXRP in Davao City and DZMQ in Dagupan.

=== Martial law period ===
At the same time that the BBS creating its network, another government organization was building up its broadcast capability to rival, or in some instances, complement, that of the BBS. The National Media Production Center (NMPC) had acquired the facilities of Voice of America in Malolos, Bulacan, in 1965 and steadily brought the old complex up to standards by a steady overhaul, fine-tuning, and outright replacement of outmoded equipment and machines. The NMPC operated the Voice of the Philippines (VOP), on both medium wave (920 kHz) and shortwave (9.81 MHz) transmissions. In 1975, the NMPC obtained DZRB-FM. With this new station and some provincial stations that came under its wings earlier, the NMPC was a network and effectively covered a wide range of the Philippine listenership.

In the 1970s, public broadcasting in the Philippines was thus represented by the BBS and the NMPC and catered to the educational and cultural needs of its audiences while endeavoring to keep it entertained with fare from indigenous material. Public service features were the keystone of its programs.

During the final months of Martial Law, both the BB and the NMPC were brought under one administrative roof in 1980 when the Office of Media Affairs was created to provide a loose union for both networks within the Broadcast Plaza along Bohol (now Sgt. Esguerra) Avenue in Diliman, Quezon City. It was not an ideal situation, since, as there had been no clear guidelines on the proper implementation of their respective operational strategies, the BB and the NMPC often squabbled, to the detriment of public broadcasting goals. Unification had created more problems for the OMA to overcome.

=== Fifth Republic (since 1986) ===
After the People Power Revolution, the Office of Media Affairs was abolished, followed by both the NMPC and the BB. Under Executive Order No. 297, on the basis of the OMA, President Corazon Aquino reestablished the Bureau of Broadcast Services (BBS) and reinstated PBS as the network under the Office of the Press Secretary's control, which led to the formation of a national radio service based on the stations in which both the NMPC and BBS had, with the PBS hosting two national AM stations and a national FM station in Manila and a number of provincial owned-and-operated and affiliate stations in the country's administrative regions.

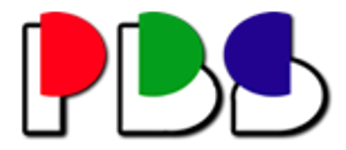
PBS logo from 1987 to 2017

During the last months of the Aquino administration, PBS along with its TV counterpart, People's Television Network transferred its offices from ABS-CBN Broadcasting Center complex to PIA/Media Center Building in Visayas Avenue, Quezon City, Metro Manila, on January 22, 1992.

On January 2, 1995, PBS relaunched its flagship station (DZFM) as Radyo ng Bayan.

During the first years in the administration of President Benigno Aquino III, the PBS-BBS was transferred to the newly created Presidential Communications Operations Office (PCOO), after the OPS was abolished.

In the beginning of 2017, PBS relaunched its FM radio service with the relaunch of FM2 and the debut of FM1 as well, forming the basis of the national FM radio division under the agency, which was later reinforced by the launch of FM1 Davao, the first state-owned regional FM radio station serving Metro Davao.

On June 5, 2017, as part of the network's 70th anniversary, PBS relaunched its flagship brand Radyo ng Bayan as Radyo Pilipinas. Three months later, on September 18, sports station DZSR merged its programming with infotainment/cultural station DZRM and became Radyo Pilipinas Dos.

On July 16, 2018, PBS-BBS and G Sat signed a Memorandum of agreement allowing PBS-BBS to add its channels to its G Sat radio channel lineup.

In October 2019, China donated over PHP130 million worth of radio broadcast equipment to the PCOO's Philippine Broadcasting Service (PBS). The donation includes live broadcast room equipment, FM broadcast transmitter equipment, and medium wave transmitter equipment. The Presidential Communications Operations Office (PCOO) will soon begin the rehabilitation of at least 14 (10 AM and four FM station) PBS Radyo Pilipinas stations nationwide. In 2021, the PBS welcomed a new network into the ranks – Radio Kidlat, a community radio network owned and operated by provincial electric cooperatives.

During his first State of the Nation Address, President Rodrigo Duterte announced that Congress would pass a proposed law merging the PBS with its TV counterpart, People's Television Network to form the People's Broadcasting Corporation (PBC), which serves a unified broadcasting entity of the republic encompassing radio, television, print and online media.

On April 10, 2023, DZRM officially rebranded as Radyo Pilipinas Tres which will serve as the country's public service station that aims to give information for disaster preparedness, bulletins and updates, and information dissemination.

Under Executive Order No. 16 series of 2023 (Reorganizing the Presidential Communications Office) issued in February 2023, the Philippine Broadcasting Service was renamed as the Presidential Broadcast Service – Bureau of Broadcast Services.

== Platforms ==
=== Radyo Pilipinas ===
Radyo Pilipinas – Radyo Publiko (formerly known as Radyo ng Bayan), the flagship AM radio station of PBS-BBS, is situated at 738 kHz on the AM band in Metro Manila with a power of 50 kW, and a network of over 32 local/regional stations in the provinces. The station broadcasts on weekdays from 4 a.m. to 9 p.m. and weekends from 6 a.m. to 9 pm. As the government's flagship radio station, it serves as a medium of development communication, a conduit between the government and the people, aiming to mobilize all sectors of society towards development and nationalism. Live, up-to-the-minute government news, live coverages of press conferences, as well as relevant information from different government sectors are featured here on this station.

Sports Radio (formerly known as Radyo Pilipinas Dos or RP2 Sports) is situated at 918 kHz on the AM band with a power of 50 kW. The station operates daily from 5 a.m. to 8 pm. Sports Radio mainly airs sports talk programming and a few non-sports content such as morning simulcasts of Radyo Pilipinas and music-oriented shows every weekend. Since 2023, the coverage of live PBA games are also broadcast here.

Radyo Magasin (formerly known as Radyo Pilipinas Tres or RP3 Alert) is situated at 1278 kHz on the AM band with a power of 10 kW. The station operates daily from 5 a.m. to 7 pm. Radyo Magasin mainly airs general information, culture-oriented programming and music-oriented shows every weekend. On October 5, 2020, PBS resumed the broadcast operations of DZRM, then the latter will also serve as disaster preparedness and information dissemination station aiming for the public to be prepared for any natural calamities.

Radyo Pilipinas World Service is the network's official external radio station broadcasting on both shortwave and internet streaming, which caters to the Overseas Filipino Workers and Filipino communities around the world. The station operates daily from 11:30 p.m. to noon PST (15:30–04:00 UTC). RP World Service main programming consists of 2–3 hours of broadcast in Filipino and English languages, and is transmitted via shortwave through the facilities of Voice of America in Tinang, Tarlac.

The current station manager of Radyo Pilipinas is Alan Allanigue, while the current station managers of Sports Radio, Radyo Magasin and World Service are Cecille Quimlat, Marinela Tecson and Rey Sampang.

=== FM division ===
In 2016, radio veteran Rizal "Sonny B" Aportadera, Jr. was appointed by then-PCOO Secretary Martin Andanar as the Director General of the Philippine Broadcasting Service (PBS). Aportadera spearheaded the establishment of its FM networks: Republika ni Juan and Capital (formerly known as FM1 and FM2).

Republika ni Juan focuses on mass-based music while Capital focuses on adult contemporary music and the simulcast of programs from Radyo Pilipinas – Radyo Publiko, Sports Radio, Radyo Magasin and Radyo Pilipinas World Service.

Both Republika ni Juan and Capital are currently managed by station manager Cheryll Ayuste.

=== New Media Unit ===
The New Media Unit was formed in 2022 as an effort to establish a social media presence for the network. Headed by Deputy Director General Joan Marie Sy-Domingo, the New Media Unit is the in-house graphic design and social media marketing group for Republ1ka FM1 and Capital FM2. The group is responsible for releasing social media content.

The New Media Unit is also the group that produces the Republikast shows aired on Republ1ka FM1's social media channels on Facebook, Instagram and YouTube. The shows are Fresh 1, Juan On 1 and FM1 Spotlight published weekly. There is also FM1 Spotlight: Livecast Edition broadcast live on Facebook and YouTube. Its schedule varies according to artists' availability.

At the beginning of imposed community quarantines due to the COVID-19 pandemic in 2020, the New Media Unit were engaged in delivering and posting relevant content to inform its audience of minimum health standards and other government announcements in relation to the quarantines and other health protocols.

== PBS stations ==
The following is a list of radio stations owned and affiliated by PBS.

=== Radyo Pilipinas ===
==== Luzon ====
Branding	Callsign	Frequency	Location
Radyo Pilipinas – Radyo Publiko	DZRB	738 kHz	Metro Manila
Sports Radio	DZSR	918 kHz	Metro Manila
Radyo Magasin	DZRM	1278 kHz	Metro Manila
Radyo Pilipinas Batanes	DWBT	1134 kHz	Basco
Radyo Pilipinas Laoag	DWFB	103.5 MHz	Laoag
Radyo Pilipinas Agoo	DZAG	97.1 MHz	Agoo
Radyo Pilipinas Tabuk	DZRK	837 kHz	Tabuk
Radyo Pilipinas Bontoc	DZRA	107.3 MHz	Bontoc
Radyo Pilipinas Baguio	DZEQ	93.7 MHz	Baguio
Radyo Pilipinas Dagupan	DZMQ	576 kHz	Dagupan
Radyo Pilipinas Tayug	DWCC	756 kHz	Tayug
Radyo Pilipinas Tuguegarao	DWPE	729 kHz	Tuguegarao
Radyo Pilipinas Lucena	DWLF	87.9 MHz	Lucena
Radyo Pilipinas Naga	DWRB	549 kHz	Naga
Radyo Pilipinas Legazpi	DWJS	621 kHz	Legazpi
Radyo Pilipinas Virac	DWDF	94.3 MHz	Virac
Radyo Pilipinas Palawan	DWMR	648 kHz	Puerto Princesa

==== Visayas ====
Branding	Callsign	Frequency	Location
Radyo Pilipinas Iloilo	DYLL	585 kHz	Iloilo City
Radyo Pilipinas Cebu	DYMR	576 kHz	Cebu City
Radyo Pilipinas Borongan	DYES	657 kHz	Borongan
Radyo Pilipinas Calbayog	DYOG	882 kHz	Calbayog
Radyo Pilipinas Sogod	DYDD	104.7 MHz	Sogod

==== Mindanao ====
Branding	Callsign	Frequency	Location
Radyo Pilipinas Zamboanga	DXMR	1170 kHz	Zamboanga City
Radyo Pilipinas Iligan	DXDX	105.5 MHz	Iligan
Radyo Pilipinas Cagayan de Oro	DXIM	936 kHz	Cagayan de Oro
Radyo Pilipinas Gingoog	DXRG	882 kHz	Gingoog
Radyo Pilipinas Davao	DXRP	88.7 MHz	Davao City
Radyo Pilipinas Butuan	DXBN	792 kHz	Butuan
Radyo Pilipinas Tandag	DXJS	98.3 MHz	Tandag
Radyo Pilipinas Marawi	DXSO	99.7 MHz	Marawi
Radyo Pilipinas Jolo	DXSM	774 kHz	Jolo
Radyo Pilipinas Tawi-Tawi	DXAS	104.7 MHz	Bongao

=== FM Stations ===
Branding	Callsign	Frequency	Location
Republika ni Juan	DWFO	87.5 MHz	Metro Manila
The Capital	DWFT	104.3 MHz	Metro Manila
Republika Davao	DXFO	87.9 MHz	Davao City

=== Affiliate stations ===
The following stations are owned by their perspective local government units or organizations. Though PBS is listed by the NTC as their owners, it acts as their affiliates.

Branding	Callsign	Frequency	Location	Owner
Radyo Pilipinas Abra	DWAZ	102.9 MHz	Bangued	Provincial Government of Abra
Adjo FM	DWCI	105.1 MHz	Piddig	Municipal Government of Piddig
Radyo Pangkaunlaran	DZDA	105.3 MHz	Tuguegarao	Department of Agriculture
Radyo Bayanian	DWCJ	98.1 MHz	Peñablanca	National Irrigation Administration
Radyo Pilipinas Quirino	DWQP	92.1 MHz	Cabarroguis	Provincial Government of Quirino
Subic Bay Radio	DWSB	89.5 MHz	Subic	Subic Bay Metropolitan Authority
RCFM	DZRG	104.7 MHz	San Antonio	Rainbow Connection Civic Group
Radyo Guagua	—N/a	99.9 MHz	Guagua	Municipal Government of Guagua
Palawan Island Network	DWCK	96.7 MHz	Puerto Princesa	Provincial Government of Palawan
Radyo Serbisyo	DWGQ	93.3 MHz	Gumaca	Gumaca Communications and Management Services
Sibol Radio	DWLP	90.5 MHz	Capalonga	Municipal Government of Capalonga
Radyo Pilipinas Camarines Norte	DWCN	96.9 MHz	Daet	Provincial Government of Camarines Norte
El Oro Radyo	DWPA	97.5 MHz	Aroroy	Municipal Government of Aroroy
Radyo Todo Aklan	DYCF	88.5 MHz	Boracay	Todo Media Services
Radyo Todo Capiz	DYCL	97.7 MHz	Panay	Todo Media Services
Radyo Kahilwayan	DYIS	106.7 MHz	Santa Barbara	Municipality of Santa, Barbara
Radyo Timbo-ok	DYTC	92.1 MHz	Carles	Municipal of Carles
BT Radio	DYPS	98.1 MHz	Tuburan, Cebu	Cebu Technological University
Ang Radyo Sa Guindulman	DYRG	99.9 MHz	Guindulman	Local Government OF Guindulman
DYDC	DYDC	104.7 MHz	Baybay	Visayas State University
Marino News FM	DXCP	106.7 MHz	Zamboanga City	Zamboanga State College of Marine Sciences and Technology
Dimataling FM	DXPV	97.7 MHz	Dimataling	Municipal Government of Dimataling
MRadio (Molave Radio)	DXPB	106.9 MHz	Molave	Municipal Government of Molave
Radyo Pilipinas Tangub	DXCT	106.5 MHz	Tangub	City Government of Tangub
Savior Radio	—N/a	106.9 MHz	El Salvador	City Government of El Salvador
Lite FM (Radyo Medina)	DXPU	103.7 MHz	Medina	Municipality of Medina
Davao City Disaster Radio	DXQQ	87.5 MHz	Davao City	City Government of Davao
Dream FM Kidapawan	DXGO	103.1 MHz	Kidapawan	DepEd Kidapawan
Kool FM	DXVL	94.9 MHz	Kabacan	University of Southern Mindanao
Mystical FM	DXPH	98.9 MHz	San Jose	Dinagat Islands Provincial Information Office
Upi for Peace	DXUP	105.5 MHz	Upi	Community Media Education Council
Lake Buluan	DXLB	104.9 MHz	Buluan	Community Media Education Council
Radyo Pilipinas Marawi	DXSO	99.7 MHz	Marawi	City Government of Marawi

=== Radyo Kidlat stations ===
The following stations are owned by their perspective local electrical cooperatives. It was launched in 2021.

Branding	Callsign	Frequency	Location	Owner
Radyo Kidlat Aparri	DWBI	103.9 MHz	Aparri	Cagayan 2 Electric Cooperative
Radyo Kidlat Isabela	DWBH	91.9 MHz	Alicia	Isabela 1 Electric Cooperative
Radyo Kidlat Nueva Vizcaya	DWBZ	100.5 MHz	Bayombong	Nueva Vizcaya Electric Cooperative
Radyo Kidlat Palauig	DWOR	98.1 MHz	Palauig	Zambales 1 Electric Cooperative
Radyo Kidlat Castillejos	DWCQ	98.3 MHz	Castillejos	Zambales 2 Electric Cooperative
Radyo Kidlat Tarlac	DWPN	87.7 MHz	Capas	Tarlac 2 Electric Cooperative
Radyo Kidlat Sara	—N/a	105.3 MHz	Sara	Iloilo 3 Electric Cooperative
Radyo Kidlat Jagna	DYPJ	100.1 MHz	Jagna	Bohol 2 Electric Cooperative
Radyo Kidlat Bindoy	—N/a	104.9 MHz	Bindoy	Negros Oriental 1 Electric Cooperative
Radyo Kidlat Dumaguete	DYPN	99.7 MHz	Dumaguete	Negros Oriental 2 Electric Cooperative
Radyo Kidlat Calbayog	DYSM	91.3 MHz	Calbayog	Samar 1 Electric Cooperative
Radyo Kidlat Ormoc	DYPL	94.3 MHz	Ormoc	Leyte 5 Electric Cooperative
Radyo Kidlat Tolosa	DYPH	90.3 MHz	Tolosa	Don Orestes Romualdez Electric Cooperative
Radyo Kidlat Pagadian	DXPY	103.1 MHz	Pagadian	Zamboanga del Sur 1 Electric Cooperative
Radyo Kidlat Laguindingan	DXCR	98.5 MHz	Laguindingan	Misamis Oriental 1 Rural Electric Service Cooperative
Radyo Kidlat Digos	DXPL	87.9 MHz	Digos	Davao del Sur Electric Cooperative
Radyo Kidlat Tacurong	DXQD	88.1 MHz	Tacurong	Sultan Kudarat Electric Cooperative
Radyo Kidlat Butuan	DXSW	87.9 MHz	Butuan	Agusan del Norte Electric Cooperative
Radyo Kidlat San Francisco	DXPI	106.5 MHz	San Francisco, Agusan del Sur	Agusan del Sur Electric Cooperative
Radyo Kidlat Siargao	DXQA	98.5 MHz	Dapa	Siargao Electric Cooperative

== See also ==
- People's Television Network
- Filipinas, Ahora Mismo
- List of radio stations in the Philippines
