= Radyo Natin =

Philippine FM radio network

Radyo Natin Nationwide
- Type: FM radio network
- Country: Philippines

Programming
- Language(s): Filipino, Various Philippine languages
- Format: Community radio

Ownership
- Owner: MBC Media Group

History
- Launch date: December 16, 1997

Coverage
- Availability: Nationwide

Links
- Webcast: Listen Live
- Website: radyonatin.com

Radyo Natin (transl. Our Radio) is a community radio network owned by MBC Media Group. It has more than 100 stations across the Philippines spread from Batanes in the northernmost part to Bongao in the south, many of which are operated through franchise agreements with different local entities. The network also runs its main feed known as Radyo Natin Nationwide, which broadcasts on 96.3 FM's HD2 channel.

== History ==
Radyo Natin was launched by MBC on December 16, 1997, as the successor to the short-lived Community Radio Network (ComNet). Initially, its programming lineup included DZRH simulcasts during the mornings, local content from late morning through early evening, and the often-controversial religious program Ang Dating Daan airing during mid-evenings until sign-off.

In mid-2017, just before the network's 20th anniversary, the majority of Hot FM stations transitioned to the Radyo Natin brand, effectively retiring the Hot FM name. This shift expanded Radyo Natin's reach, growing its network to over 120 stations nationwide.

On October 2, 2019, a major fire gutted the nearby Star City theme park, which severely affected the operations of its main studios and satellite uplink facilities of Radyo Natin Nationwide, located at the MBC Building in the CCP Complex, Pasay, along with its sister MBC radio stations. During this period, Radyo Natin temporarily broadcast from its backup studios at the BSA Twin Towers in Ortigas. Meanwhile, many local stations suspended their network hookup due to the outage and filled airtime with local music and filler programs until January 2022.

On November 15, 2021, Radyo Natin Nationwide relaunched its new logo along with the new logos of all MBC radio stations and its new corporate slogan, Sama-Sama Tayo, Pilipino! (lit. transl. Let's Be Together, Filipinos!). In February 2022, after a three-year hiatus, the central studios of Radyo Natin Nationwide returned to the newly renovated MBC Building inside the Star City complex.

== Composition and network synopsis ==
=== Programming ===
All Radyo Natin stations operate on the FM band, each delivering a hometown radio format. Weekday mornings feature local programming from 4:00 a.m. to 5:00 a.m. and 8:30 a.m. to 1:00 p.m., with a simulcast of DZRH, MBC's flagship AM station, airing from 5:00 a.m. to 7:00 a.m. This programming pattern is similarly followed on weekend mornings and Sunday afternoons until 7:00 p.m.

Network-level afternoon programming is broadcast to all stations Monday through Saturday at 1:00 p.m., followed by a two-hour local programming window from 5:00 p.m. to 7:00 p.m. Primetime network shows conclude with Evenings with Dennis and Jay on weekdays and Gladly Yours on Saturdays, with the network feed signing off at 10:00 p.m. Afterward, stations may choose to air local late-night programming by either omitting the closing prayer, intended for stations signing off at midnight, or by seamlessly transitioning to their own sign-off sequence.

=== Technology ===
Former logo used from December 16, 1997, to November 2021.

From its central studios at the MBC Building within the Star City Complex in Pasay, Radyo Natin signals its stations via satellite technology. The stations then broadcast the signals to their respective areas of responsibility.

Radyo Natin used to operate two kinds of low-power FM stations. The first one operates with a transmitter power of 500 watts but with an effective radiated power (ERP) of 1 kilowatt. The other one had much lower power (100 watts); these stations were allowed to operate by the NTC with permits issued during the time of Commissioner Rio. However, the same permits were recalled during the time of NTC Commissioner Borje. Currently, most Radyo Natin stations broadcast at 500 watts and 1 kilowatt designated for smaller provinces but few stations broadcast on a full-power 5 kilowatt or 10 kilowatt signal designated for major market cities.

== Proposed TV companion ==
TV Natin was in the pipeline, originally as part of the Radyo Natin project, but it was never launched. RHTV instead was launched as a separate MBC venture and not even under the division of DZRH.

In December 2008, TV Natin changed to DZRH RadyoVision, now DZRH News Television later DZRHTV.

== Personalities ==
=== Anchors ===
- Angelo Palmones (also with DZRH)
- Anthony Taberna (also with DZRH)
- Gerry Baja (also with DZRH)
- Glady Mabini (also with DZRH)

=== Disc jockeys ===
- Cheska San Diego-Bobadilla (also with DZRH)
- Dennis Lazo
- Kleir Pineda
- Atty. Ethel Aldea
- Jay Perillo
- Ellanie Bensal (also with DZRH)
- Faith Salaver-Clamor (also with DZRH)
- DJ Eduard
- DJ Fatima

== Programming ==
*Simulcast with DZRH and DZRH TV

=== Network programs ===
==== News/talk ====
- Magandang Umaga Pilipinas*
- Dos por Dos*
- Radyo Natin Nationwide (with Angelo Palmones and Cheska San Diego-Bobadilla)

==== Specialty ====
- Ang Galing Mo Doc*
- Lunas (with Dennis Lazo)
- Negosyo Atbp.*

==== Music and entertainment ====
- Chillax Time (with DJ Elanie & DJ Fatima)
- Tugstugan (with DJ Faith & DJ Eduard)
- Evenings with Dennis and Jay (with Dennis and Jay)
- BFF (with Atty. Ethel Aldea)
- Saturday Rewind (with DJ Kleir)
- Sunday Buffet: All the Way! (with DJ Elanie)
- Gladly Yours (with Glady Mabini)

=== Syndicated programming ===
These programs are exclusively fed to select stations by the network, fed by a Radyo Natin affiliate to fellow Radyo Natin stations in their area, or fed by a blocktimer to select stations.

- Trans World Radio
- Kasangga At Kalusugan with Engimar Camonias
- Dok Alternatibo (blocktimer; selected stations only)
- The Voice of Prophecy (produced by Adventist World Radio)
- Kalusugan iwas Karamdaman (produced by Clinica De Alternativo Medicina and Wellness Center And Yes2health Inc.)

== Awards ==
Radyo Natin has been awarded as the Best Provincial FM Station in the Philippines for 4 consecutive years on the 21st, 22nd, 23rd and 26th KBP Golden Dove Awards (2012, 2013, 2014 and 2018).
