= List of radio stations in Iloilo =

Below is a list of radio stations in Iloilo City and Iloilo Province, whose coverage is in part or whole of the same.

== AM Stations ==
Frequency	Name	Company	Format	Call Sign	Power	Covered Location
585 AM	Radyo Pilipinas Iloilo	Presidential Broadcast Service	News, Public Affairs, Talk, Government Radio	DYLL	5 KW	Iloilo City
720 AM	Aksyon Radyo Iloilo	MBC Media Group	News, Public Affairs, Talk, Drama	DYOK	10 KW	Iloilo City
774 AM	RMN DYRI Iloilo	Radio Mindanao Network	News, Public Affairs, Talk, Drama	DYRI	10 KW	Iloilo City
837 AM	Bombo Radyo Iloilo	People's Broadcasting Service, Inc. (part of Bombo Radyo Philippines)	News, Public Affairs, Talk, Drama	DYFM	10 KW	Iloilo City
1017 AM	Life Radio Iloilo	Allied Broadcasting Center (operated by JPG Broadcasting Network)	News, Public Affairs, Talk	DYRP	10 KW	Iloilo City
1053 AM	Ang Dios Gugma	Global Broadcasting System, Inc. (operated by Ang Dios Gugma Catholic Ministries; a member of the Catholic Media Network)	Religious Radio	DYDA	5 KW	Iloilo City
1323 AM	Super Radyo Iloilo	GMA Network, Inc.	News, Public Affairs, Talk	DYSI	10 KW	Iloilo City
1485 AM	DZRH Iloilo (relay from Manila)	Pacific Broadcasting System, Inc. (an affiliate of MBC Media Group)	News, Public Affairs, Talk, Drama	DYDH-AM	1 KW	Iloilo City

== FM Stations ==
Frequency	Name	Company	Format	Call Sign	Power	Covered Location
88.7 FM	K5 News FM Iloilo	FBS Radio Network, Inc. (operated by 5K Broadcasting Network, Inc.)	Contemporary MOR, News, Talk	DYKU	10 kW	Iloilo City
89.1 FM	K5 News FM Passi	5K Broadcasting Network, Inc.	Contemporary MOR, News, Talk	—N/a	1 kW	Passi
89.5 FM	Home Radio Iloilo	Aliw Broadcasting Corporation	Soft AC	DYQN	10 kW	Iloilo City
90.5 FM	Radyo Himulat North FM	Subic Broadcasting Corporation	Contemporary MOR, News, Talk	DYTC	1 kW	Estancia
90.7 FM	Kings Radio Lambunao	KAMM Media Network	Contemporary MOR, News, Talk	—N/a	20 Watts	Lambunao
92.1 FM	Radyo Timbo-ok	Presidential Broadcast Service	Community Radio	DYCO	1 kW	Carles
92.3 FM	Easy Rock Iloilo	MBC Media Group (operated by RVV Broadcast Ventures)	Soft AC	DYYS	10 kW	Iloilo City
93.5 FM	Barangay LS Iloilo	GMA Network, Inc.	Contemporary MOR, OPM	DYMK	10 kW	Iloilo City
94.7 FM	Spirit FM Calinog	Global Broadcasting System, Inc. (operated by the Archdiocese of Jaro; a member of the Catholic Media Network)	Contemporary MOR, OPM, Religious Radio	DYMI	5 kW	Calinog
95.1 FM	iFM Iloilo	Radio Mindanao Network	Contemporary MOR, OPM, News	DYIC	10 kW	Iloilo City
97.5 FM	Love Radio Iloilo	Philippine Broadcasting Corporation (an affiliate of Manila Broadcasting Company; operated by RVV Broadcast Ventures)	Contemporary MOR, OPM	DYMB	10 kW	Iloilo City
98.3 FM	RJFM Iloilo (relay from Manila)	Free Air Broadcasting Network, Inc. (Rajah Broadcasting Network)	Adult Hits	DYNJ	5 kW	Iloilo City
98.9 FM	ADG FM	Deus Amor Est Broadcasting, Inc.	Catholic Radio	DYDA	5 kW	Estancia
99.5 FM	Star FM Iloilo	People's Broadcasting Service, Inc. (part of Bombo Radyo Philippines)	Contemporary MOR, OPM, News	DYRF	10 kW	Iloilo City
100.1 FM	K3 FM Calinog	Philippine Army 3rd Civil-Military Operations (Spearhead) Battalion (affiliated with 5K Broadcasting Network, Inc.)	Contemporary MOR, News, Talk	—N/a	20 Watts	Calinog
100.7 FM	XFM Iloilo	Global Broadcasting System, Inc. (operated by Yes2Health Advertising, Inc.)	Contemporary MOR, News, Talk	DYOZ	10 kW	Iloilo City
101.1 FM	K3 FM Leganes	Philippine Army 3rd Civil-Military Operations (Peacemaker) Battalion (affiliated with 5K Broadcasting Network, Inc.)	Contemporary MOR, News, Talk	—N/a	20 Watts	Leganes
101.5 FM	Short FM Dumangas	5K Broadcasting Network, Inc.	Contemporary MOR, News, Talk	—N/a	50 Watts	Dumangas
102.7 FM	DYUP	University of the Philippines Visayas	Campus Radio	DYUP-FM	1 kW	Miagao
103.5 FM	Anchor Radio Iloilo	Iloilo Baptist Church	Religious Radio	—N/a	20 Watts	Iloilo City
105.1 FM	K3 FM Miagao	Philippine Army 61st Infantry (Hunter) Battalion (affiliated with 5K Broadcasting Network, Inc.)	Contemporary MOR, News, Talk	—N/a	1 kW	Miagao
105.9 FM	Wild FM Iloilo	UM Broadcasting Network	Contemporary MOR, Dance, OPM	DYWT	10 kW	Iloilo City
106.7 FM	Radyo Kahilwayan	Municipal Government of Santa Barbara	Contemporary MOR, News, Talk	DYIS	5 kW	Santa Barbara
107.9 FM	Win Radio Iloilo	Mabuhay Broadcasting System, Inc. (operated by ZimZam Management, Inc.)	Contemporary MOR, OPM	DYNY	10 kW	Iloilo City
