= List of television and radio stations in Iloilo City =

List of radio and television stations in Iloilo City and Iloilo Province, the Philippines.

== Radio stations ==
=== FM Stations ===
- 88.7 K5 News FM (DYKU; FBS Radio Network; operated by 5K Broadcasting Network, Inc.)
- 89.5 Home Radio (DYQN; Aliw Broadcasting Corporation)
- FM Radio 90.1 (Philippine Collective Media Corporation)
- 92.3 Easy Rock (DYYS; MBC Media Group)
- Barangay LS 93.5 (DYMK; GMA Network Inc.)
- 95.1 iFM (DYIC; Radio Mindanao Network)
- 97.5 Love Radio (DYMB; Philippine Broadcasting Corporation; an affiliate of MBC Media Group)
- RJFM 98.3 (DYNJ; Free Air Broadcasting Network, Inc./Rajah Broadcasting Network; relay from Manila)
- 99.5 Star FM (DYRF; People's Broadcasting Service, Inc.; part of Bombo Radyo Philippines)
- 100.7 XFM (DYOZ; Global Broadcasting System, Inc.; operated by Yes2Health Advertising, Inc.)
- 103.5 The Anchor Radio
- 104.7 Brigada News FM (DYIL; Brigada Mass Media Corporation/Baycomms Broadcasting Corporation)
- 105.9 Wild FM (DYWT; Ditan Communications under UM Broadcasting Network)
- 107.9 Win Radio (DYNY; Mabuhay Broadcasting System; operated by ZimZam Management)

=== AM Stations ===
- DYLL Radyo Pilipinas 585 (DYLL; Philippine Broadcasting Service)
- DYOK Aksyon Radyo 720 (DYOK; MBC Media Group)
- DYRI RMN Iloilo 774 (DYRI; Radio Mindanao Network)
- DYFM Bombo Radyo 837 (DYFM; People's Broadcasting Service, Inc.; part of Bombo Radyo Philippines)
- DYBQ Radyo Budyong 981 (DYBQ; Intercontinental Broadcasting Corporation) (Defunct)
- DYRP-AM Life Radio Iloilo (DYRP; Allied Broadcasting Center)
- DYDA Ang Dios Gugma 1053 (DYDA; Global Broadcasting System, Inc.; operated by Deus Amor Est Broadcasting, Inc. and a member of the Catholic Media Network)
- DYSI Super Radyo 1323 (DYSI; GMA Network Inc.)
- DZRH 1485 (DYDH; Pacific Broadcasting System, Inc., an affiliate of MBC Media Group; relay from Manila)

== TV stations ==
=== Analog ===
- PTV 2 (People's Television Network)
- GMA TV-6 (GMA Network Inc.)
- ALLTV-10 (Advanced Media Broadcasting System)
- GTV 28 (GMA Network Inc.)
- TV5 Channel 36 (Cignal TV; operated by TV5 Network Inc.)

=== Digital ===
- (PA) 16 All TV Iloilo (Advanced Media Broadcasting System)
- DYJB-DTV 17 IBC Iloilo (Intercontinental Broadcasting Corporation)
- DYMB-DTV 18 TV5 Iloilo (Cignal TV; operated by TV5 Network Inc.)
- DYZA-DTV 20 A2Z/Light TV (ZOE Broadcasting Network)
- DYDY-DTV 23 PTV Guimaras (People's Television Network)
- DYRM-DTV 26 BEAM TV (Broadcast Enterprises and Affiliated Media)
- DYXX-DTV 29 GMA Iloilo (GMA Network Inc.)
- DYOK-DTV 43 DZRH TV (MBC Media Group)

=== Cable & Satellite TV ===
- Sky Cable Iloilo
- Panay Broadband (Panay Community Channel 8)
- Converge FiberTV Iloilo
- Planet Cable Iloilo
- Cable Star, Inc. (One Panay TV Channel 1)
- Cignal TV
