= State University of Northern Negros =

Public college in Negros Occidental, Philippines

- Pamantasang Pampamahalaan ng Kahilagaang Negros (Filipino)
- Former names: Northern Negros State College of Science and Technology (1998–2024); Old Sagay Barangay High School (1970–1983); Iloilo State College of Fisheries - Sagay Branch (1983-1998)
- Motto: In Scientia et Servitio
- Motto in English: In Science and Service
- Type: State university
- Established: 1998
- Affiliations: PASUC
- President: Dr. Renante A. Egcas
- Vice-president: Dr. Jocelyn D. Bantigue (VP for Academic Affairs); Dr. Adybier M. Lobaton (VP for Administration)
- Location: Sagay, Negros Occidental, Philippines; 10°52′38″N 123°24′54″E
- Website: sunn.edu.ph
- Location in the Visayas Location in the Philippines

The State University of Northern Negros (SUNN), formerly Northern Negros State College of Science and Technology (Filipino: Kolehiyong Pampamahalaan sa Agham at Teknolohiya ng Kahilagaang Negros) and abbreviated as NONESCOST, is a state university in Sagay, Negros Occidental, Philippines.

== History ==
NONESCOST former seal

The college started as a satellite campus of Iloilo State College of Fisheries until it was separated into an independent college and renamed Northern Negros State College of Science and Technology. It was created on January 9, 1998, by Republic Act 8448 by then-Congressman Alfredo G. Marañon Jr. In March 2023, the college started offering online agritourism and ecotourism courses. On January 22, 2024, the Commission on Higher Education converted the state college into a state university.

== General mandate ==
The college is mandated to provide higher technological, professional, and vocational instruction and training in science, fishery, forestry, agriculture, engineering, and industrial fields, as well as short-term technical or vocational courses. It is also mandated to promote research, advanced studies, extension work, and progressive leadership in its areas of specialization.

== Campuses ==
=== Main campus ===
- Sagay City

=== Satellite campuses ===
- Old Sagay Campus, Sagay City, Negros Occidental
- Calatrava Campus, Mun. of Calatrava, Negros Occidental
- Escalante Campus, Escalante City, Negros Occidental
