= DYXX =

DYXX is a callsign once shared by two Philippines broadcast stations traditionally associated with GMA Network in Iloilo City, Philippines:

- DYXX, 1323 kHz AM, the original callsign for what is now radio station DYSI
- DYXX-TV (channel 6), known as GMA TV-6 Iloilo
