= DYMB =

DYMB is the callsign of two stations in Iloilo City, Philippines:

- DYMB-FM, an FM radio station, broadcasting as Love Radio
- DYMB-TV, a TV station, broadcasting as TV5
