= Alfredo Marañon III =

Filipino politician (born 1970)

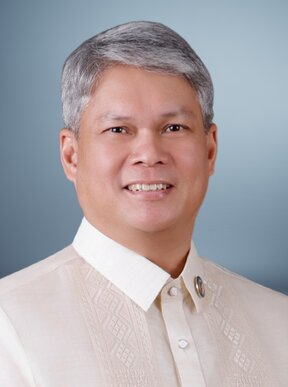
- Official portrait, 2025

Member of the Philippine House of Representatives from Negros Occidental's 2nd District
- Incumbent
- Assumed office June 30, 2022
- Preceded by: Leo Rafael Cueva
- In office June 30, 2004 – June 30, 2013
- Preceded by: Alfredo Marañon
- Succeeded by: Leo Rafael Cueva

Mayor of Sagay
- In office June 30, 2013 – June 30, 2022

Personal details
- Born: Alfredo Dalisay Marañon III; June 26, 1970 (age 55) Sagay, Negros Occidental, Philippines
- Party: NUP (2011–present); UNEGA (local party; 2004–present)
- Other political affiliations: Lakas (2007–2011); KAMPI (2007–2008); NPC (2004–2007)
- Parent(s): Alfredo Maranon; Marilyn Dalisay-Marañon
- Occupation: Politician

Alfredo "Thirdy" Dalisay Marañon III (born June 26, 1970) is a Filipino politician who served as the representative of Negros Occidental's 2nd congressional district since 2022. He previously served as mayor of Sagay. His father is former Negros Occidental Governor Alfredo Marañon.

== Political career ==
Marañon was first elected as congressman for the 2nd congressional district of Negros Occidental in 2004. After being term-limited, Marañon was elected as Mayor of Sagay in 2013. After serving three terms, Marañon ran again and won a congressional race in 2022 for the 2nd congressional district of Negros Occidental.

As congressman, Marañon has filed bills relating to health and social security measures. Marañon was also an advocate for the creation of the Negros Island Region.

In the 20th Congress, Marañon was appointed as the chairperson of the Philippine House Committee on Natural Resources.

From 2023 to 2025, Marañon received ₱3.08 billion of "allocable" funds from the national budget. These "Allocable" funds have been criticized by the People’s Budget Coalition as a new form of pork barrel, since it goes to "politically determined projects that crowd out more equitable and accountable public spending"

== Personal life ==
Marañon was born on June 26, 1970, to politician Alfredo Marañon and former Dr. Marilyn Dalisay-Marañon.
