= Sagay, Negros Occidental =

Component city in Negros Occidental, Philippines

Sagay
- Component city
- City of Sagay
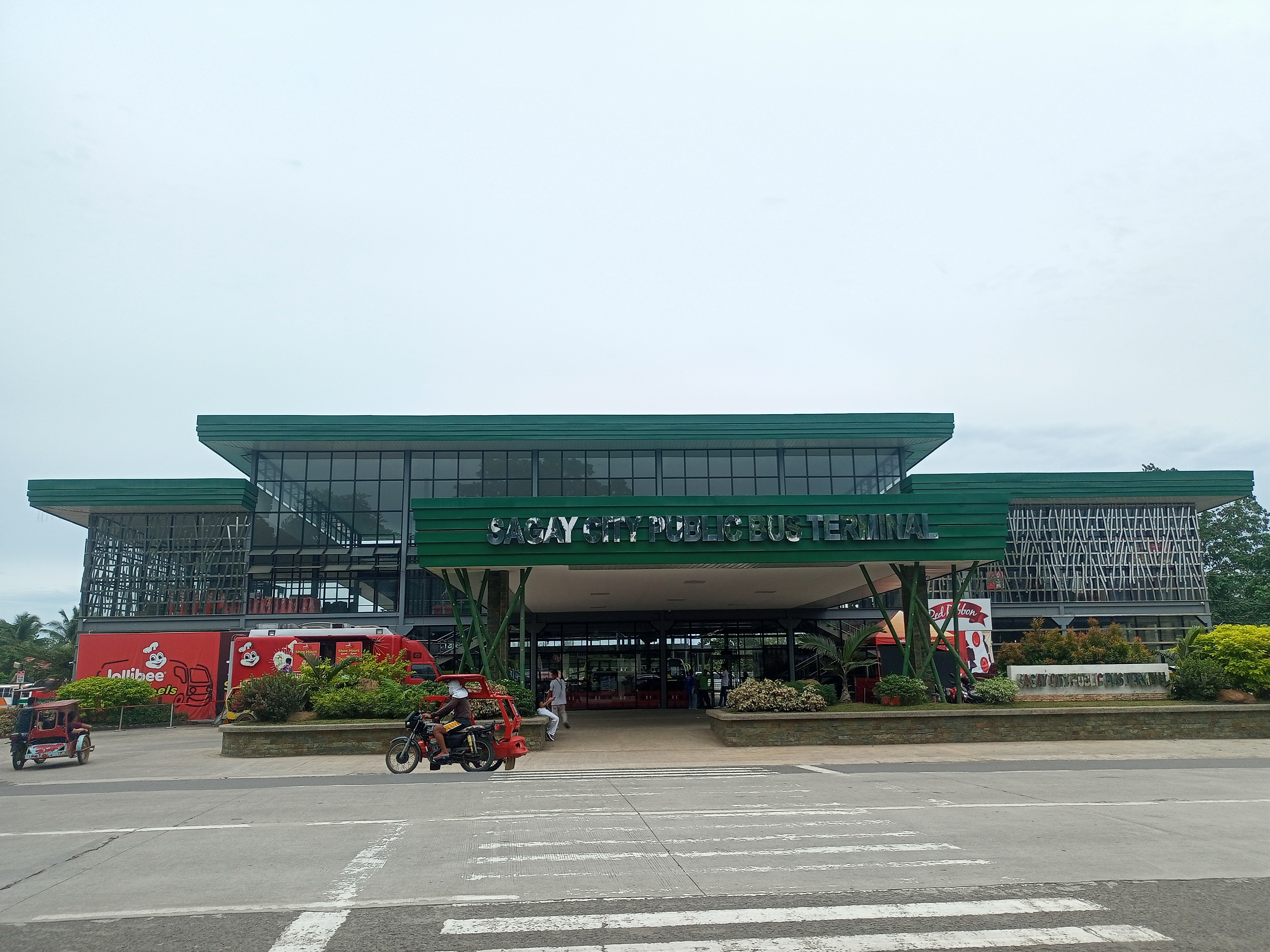
- Sagay City Public Bus Terminal

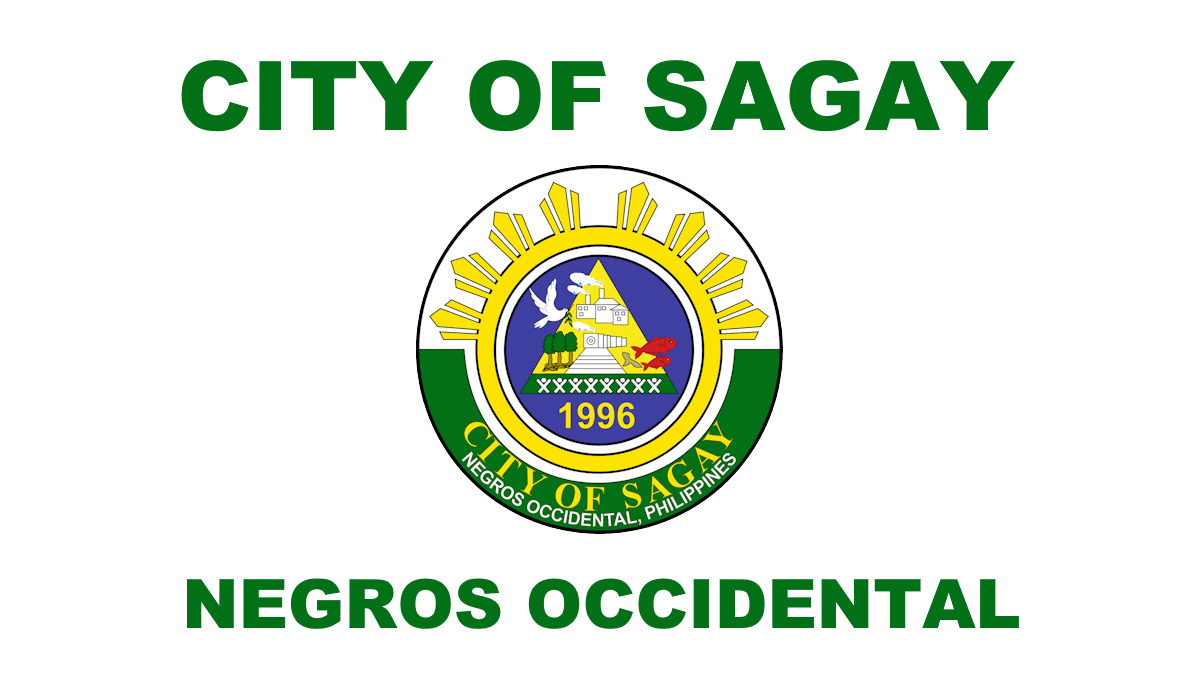
- Flag Seal
- Nickname: Garden City of the North
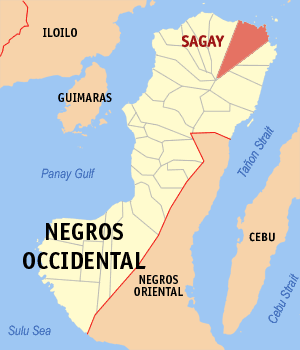
- Map of Negros Occidental with Sagay highlighted
- Interactive map of Sagay
- Location within the Philippines
- Coordinates: 10°54′N 123°25′E
- Country: Philippines
- Region: Negros Island Region
- Province: Negros Occidental
- District: 2nd district
- Founded: 1860
- Cityhood: August 10, 1996
- Barangays: 25 (see Barangays)

Government
  - Type: Sangguniang Panlungsod
  - Mayor: Leo Rafael M. Cueva (NUP)
  - Vice Mayor: Narciso L. Javelosa, Jr. (NUP)
  - Representative: Alfredo D. Marañon III (NUP)
  - City Council: Members: Exequiel J. Marañon; Perfecto B. Marañon; Christopher U. Javelosa; Lura A. Javelosa; Benson P. Fernandez; Roldan A. Gamao; Mel Alexis T. Serondo; Concepcion O. Javellana; Eddie R. Lobaton, Jr.; Sherwin A. Sy; Marnielin B. Marco ^{◌}; ◌ ex officio SK chairman
  - Electorate: 85,162 voters (2025)

Area
  - Total: 330.34 km^{2} (127.54 sq mi)
- Elevation: 108 m (354 ft)
- Highest elevation: 1,850 m (6,070 ft)
- Lowest elevation: 0 m (0 ft)

Population (2024 census)
  - Total: 152,543
  - Density: 461.78/km^{2} (1,196.0/sq mi)
  - Households: 36,088

Economy
  - Income class: 2nd city income class
  - Poverty incidence: 24.81% (2023)
  - Revenue: ₱ 1,363 million (2024)
  - Assets: ₱ 3,849 million (2024)
  - Expenditure: ₱ 1,317 million (2024)
  - Liabilities: ₱ 2,178 million (2024)

Service provider
  - Electricity: Northern Negros Electric Cooperative (NONECO)
- Time zone: UTC+8 (PST)
- ZIP code: 6122, 6123 (Paraiso /Fabrica only)
- PSGC: 064523000
- IDD : area code: +63 (0)34
- Native languages: Hiligaynon; Cebuano; Tagalog
- Website: www.sagay-city.com.ph

Sagay, officially the City of Sagay (Hiligaynon: Dakbanwa sang Sagay; Cebuano: Dakbayan sa Sagay; Filipino: Lungsod ng Sagay), is a component city in the province of Negros Occidental, Philippines. According to the 2024 census, it has a population of 152,543 people.

== Etymology ==
The name of the city comes from the semi-spherical shell called "sigay", which can be found in the area.

== History ==
=== Spanish era ===
Sagay was originally called Argüelles when Lt. Francisco Rodríguez and Basilio Córdova founded it in 1860 in the mouth of the Bulanon River. Later, by the order of the Spanish governor the town was transferred to Pueblo de Magallanes (now known as Old Sagay) in honor of Ferdinand Magellan.

Having the status of a pueblo, Sagay was entitled to have a capitán del pueblo, the highest town official during the time. The first to be appointed to this position by the Spanish Governor was Eulalio Rodríguez. Gregorio Parreño, then Pedro Katalbás y Villanueva, later succeeded him.

During the Philippine Revolution, Sagay contributed to what proved to be a successful national struggle for independence. The First Philippine Republic was however short-lived when the country passed to the hands of another colonial power, the United States of America in 1898.

=== American period ===
In 1906, during the administration of the second President Benjamin Adolfo, the name of the town was officially changed to Sagay. The name was taken from the semi-spherical shell called "sigay", which can be found in the area. The American influence seeped into every aspect of Sagay's life, politically and culturally. At this period of Sagay's history, land transportation began to supplant sea travel, but the seaside community continued to flourish. The first public schools conducted in English were established. Cornelio Pascual Sr. was the first English Teacher assigned in Vito. American missionaries were sent to tutor more Filipino English teachers.

Meanwhile, sometime in 1907, the Insular Lumber Company, reputed to be the biggest hardwood lumber mill in the world, was established in what is now Barangay Fabrica. Though measures to prevent the destruction of Sagay's rich forest were made, reforestation programs failed. Later, the old forest areas were converted mostly into sugarcane fields and some into cornfields. With the exhaustion of the forest resources of Sagay, the ILCO – Philippines was phased out in 1975 and later transferred to Hinoba-an.

A major industrial development gave Sagay another big step forward: the establishment of the Lopez Sugar Central in the 1920s. Also during these years, sugar, copra, lumber and fishing became the important source of income for the inhabitants. The economic growth of Sagay brought about influx of migrants from Iloilo, Guimaras, Cebu and Bohol. This trend made Sagay a melting pot of ethnically different but equally-hardworking Cebuanos and Ilonggos. With these developments, business and industry flourished. Leading both sectors were big businessmen and industrialists like the Lopezes, the Cuaycongs, the Jisons, the Gamboas, and the Vasquezes. The sugar boom brought the "old families" into the industry like the Pueys, the Nichols, the Katalbases, and the Tupases, which branched out to the Marañons, the de la Pazes, the Ibrados and the Libo-ons.

However during the 1920s, many of the sugar millers in Negros experienced great losses and substantial amounts of debt. When sugar prices fell sharply in 1921, the sugar centrals financed by the Philippine National Bank struggled to pay interest. Ownership of these centrals changed, and PNB president Venancio Concepcion was imprisoned for mismanagement of bank funds related to sugar loans. The Lopez family, the family who owned the Lopez Sugar Central, managed to distance themselves from the PNB.

=== World War II ===
During the Japanese occupation, two Civil Governments existed in Sagay. Under the Japanese national government of Jose P. Laurel, Vicente Katalbas was appointed mayor, while the resistance government of the province, headed by Alfredo Montelibano Sr. as governor, appointed Tomas Londres as Mayor whose seat of government was in the mountain areas of Sitio Balibag, Lopez Jaena. Their term however, abruptly ended when the combined Filipino and American forces liberated the province from the Japanese at the early part of 1945. When Sergio Osmeña, took over as president, Teodoro Lopez Sr. was appointed Mayor of Sagay. During his short term, Lopez concentrated in rebuilding the administrative machinery of the local government.

Several hundreds thousand Filipino soldiers and officers of the 7th, 72nd and 75th Infantry Division of the Philippine Commonwealth Army and the 7th Constabulary Regiment of the Philippine Constabulary liberated and re-occupied the town of Sagay by attacking and driving off Japanese troops in 1945.

The factories were destroyed and the economy was in shambles. The Eusebio Lopez Memorial School Building in Barangay Paraiso served as the incarceration area for captured Filipino soldiers and American pilots and soldiers. It also served as the headquarters of Fourth Flight Division of the Japanese Imperial Air Force whose airfield was located in Pula-Bunglas area in Barangay Malubon. During the last days of the war, the Fourth Flight Division of the Japanese Imperial Airforce organized kamikaze or suicide units to be stationed here and in Bacolod. Known later as the Third Regiment Suicide Corps, it was headed by Major Tsuneharu Sirai with Capt. Tetsuzu Kimura as his Chief Staff Officer. Of its 59 pilots and crews, 30 were killed in the Battle of Leyte Gulf which they played a major role as kamikaze pilots. The Pula – Bunglas area of Barangay Malubon served as the Japanese landing field for the Fourth Flight Division. It was also a site where the local soldiers, guerrillas and civilians, after Japanese spies identified them as guerrilla members or collaborators, were forced to dig holes and consequently executed and buried. Old residents believe that almost 1,542 people were buried here.

Barrio 3 Wharf, Fabrica served as the transport point of processed lumber destined to Japan from Insular Lumber Company and also a docking area of Japanese supply ship during the war-torn years. The Iglanggam Bridge at Barangay Tadlong served as the dumping site of executed local soldiers, guerrillas and civilians. This is also known as the site where confiscated money, especially silver Peso coins encased in concrete blocks, were dumped by the retreating Japanese soldiers.

Balibag Hill, Lopez Jaena was the place where the seat of the resistance government of Free Sagay under Mayor Londres was established. It was also known as tabo-an or market place during the war and in 1944, a group of Japanese soldiers killed about 27 homeguards or "toltog" guerrillas. After the mass killing, the Japanese soldiers set the whole area on fire, burning the shanties and the dead. The Japanese "puppet" government under Katalbas was established at the Big House, Central Lopez, Paraiso. A Japanese barracks and checkpoint was established. A Japanese anti-aircraft still can be found inside the ground of the house.

At Barangay Poblacion II, Japanese zero fighters left bullet holes when they intended to destroy the water supply of the people during the last days of the war. Holes from 60mm machine-guns left an indelible mark on the water tank.

A training site of USAFFE (United States Army Forces in the Far East), under the supervision of Lt. Dominador Gaerlan, was established at Tangnonon, Barangay Fabrica at the ancestral home of Lopez Kabayao.

On July 26, 1942, US President Franklin D. Roosevelt ordered a national mobilization in the Philippines and on August 23, 1942, the first group of reservist in Negros were called on duty by virtue of Philippine Army HQ order of August 4 and they were trained here. The first group reported in the said mobilization camp constituted the 71st Infantry Regiment.

=== Post war period ===
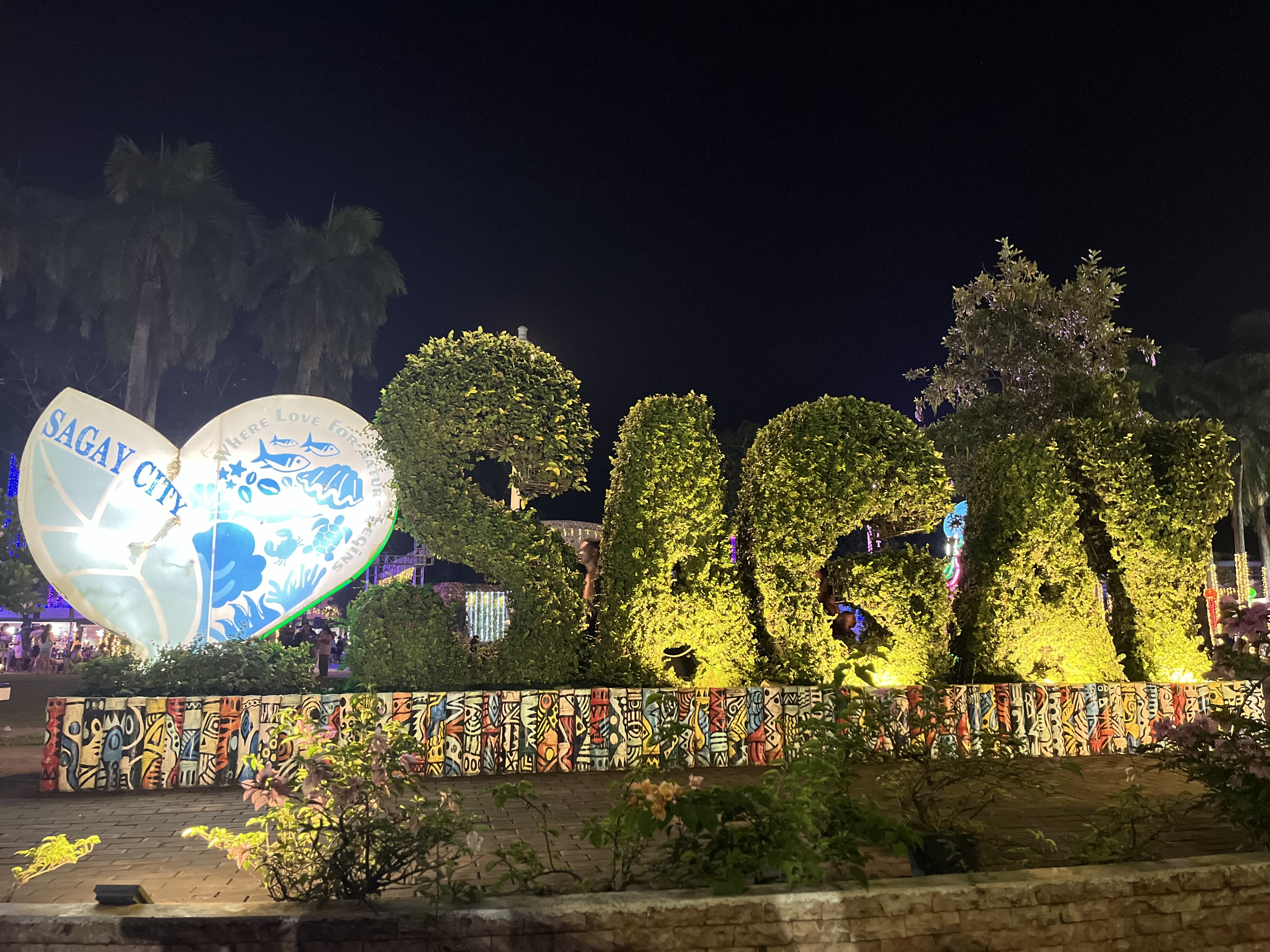
A signage of Sagay City along its highway

The first election held right after the Second World War made Jose B. Puey Sr. and Amalio Cueva Sr. Mayor and Vice Mayor respectively. However, shortly after, Mayor Puey was appointed member of the Provincial Board of Negros Occidental thus Vice Mayor Cueva took over the Municipal leadership and through his initiative, the seat of government was transferred to its present site, Dalusan. Incidentally, the transfer signaled the diminishing importance of sea travel and the takeover of overland transportation as the conveyor of progress and development. Old Sagay (the previous seat of government) is an old coastal center of population while Dalusan is a late highway occurrence. The transfer was made possible partly through land donations for the town site by Doña Rosario Cooper and the heirs of Clayton Nichols. Schools, markets and commercial establishments were soon established. Puey remained Provincial Board Member until his election as congressman for the first District Negros Occidental in 1953.

In the late 1950s, two Sagaynon politicians were in the forefront of Negros politics, Jose B. Puey Sr. (Congressman from 1953 to 1957) and Alfredo E. Marañon Sr. (board member from 1956 to 1959). This meant that provincial and national aid were extended to Sagay. More roads and school buildings were constructed, thousands of hectares of logged off area of the Insular Lumber Company were planted with coconut trees and sugarcane. Sherman Hill, near Barangay Bato was discovered to contain rich deposits of the highest silica. The growing markets for sea products brought about unprecedented boom in the fishing industry for which the coastal waters of Sagay proved to equal the demand. The municipal population rose to more than 60,000 and the revenue increased. After Mayor Amalio Cueva, came Tereso Canoy, Bruno Cueva Sr. and Quintin Katalbas.

In 1963, Jose H. Puey Jr. was elected mayor of Sagay. The income continued to rise. More schools were built and more roads, linking the barangays to the town capital, were constructed. The inefficient electrical system was updated, fire fighting equipment and the police units were modernized. It was during this time that Alfredo Marañon Sr. began entertaining the idea of putting up another sugar mill in Sagay which farmers can partly own. He campaigned for support, but there was too much opposition even from some of his close friends. Nevertheless, his idea became a reality when in 1967, shortly after his death, Sagay Central Inc. was born. Marañon's dream was made real through the help of President Ferdinand Marcos and the then Philippine National Bank President Roberto S. Benedicto who both shared his vision for Sagay. With the new sugar mill at Barangay Bato, new areas were opened and planted with sugarcane. Today the new sugar mill factory is benefiting hundreds of small farmers.

The then mayor, Congressman and governor of Negros Occidental Alfredo G. Marañon Jr. assumed the political leadership of Sagay in 1972. Under his administration, Sagay acquired a new town hall, a municipal gymnasium, a livestock auction market, public markets for a number of barangays and municipal wharves in barangays Vito and Old Sagay. He caused the organization of Sagay Water District in 1978. He effected the purchase of a municipal subdivision for the municipal employees in 1979. These achievements by themselves have helped make Sagay a first-class C municipality (the highest in the entire Negros). The then Mayor Alfredo G. Marañon Jr.'s successful negotiation of the sponsorship contract with the German District Osterholz is his most important achievement.

=== Cityhood ===
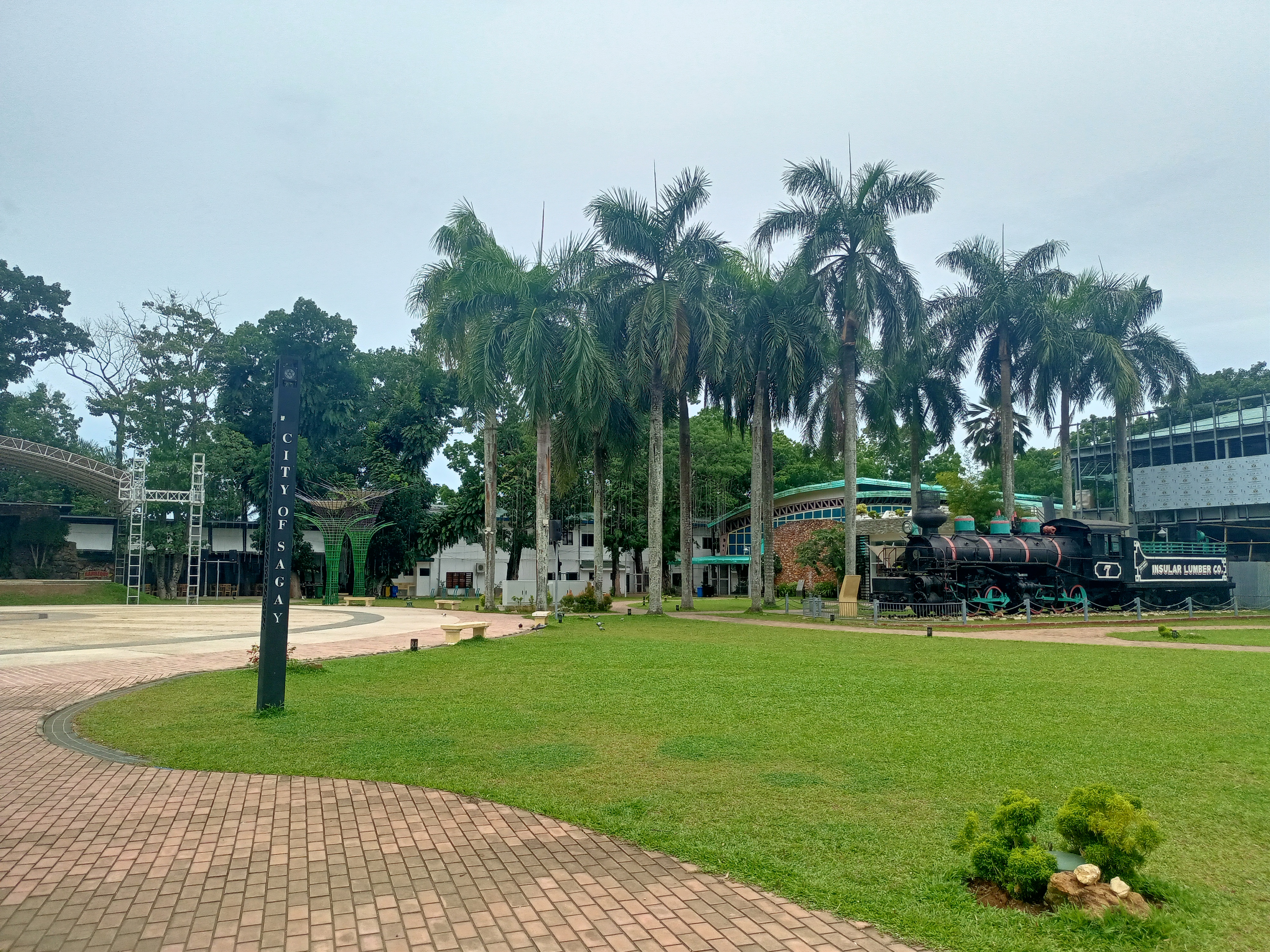
Sagay City Public Plaza

The leadership of Mayor Joseph G. Marañon and Vice Mayor Fortunato S. Javelosa inspired the authorship of Congressman Alfredo G. Marañon of House Bill No. 6543, "An Act Converting the Municipality of Sagay into a component city of Negros Occidental" during the 10th Congress. Passing through the legislation process, a public hearing was held in Sagay on February 22, 1996. On May 3, 1996, Sen. Raul Roco sponsored the Senate Bill No. 1191, the Senate version of the cityhood. On June 11, 1996, then President Fidel V. Ramos signed into law RA8192, now the charter of Sagay City. On June 10, 1996, the residents voted and ratified RA8192 and made Sagay, officially Sagay City.

== Geography ==
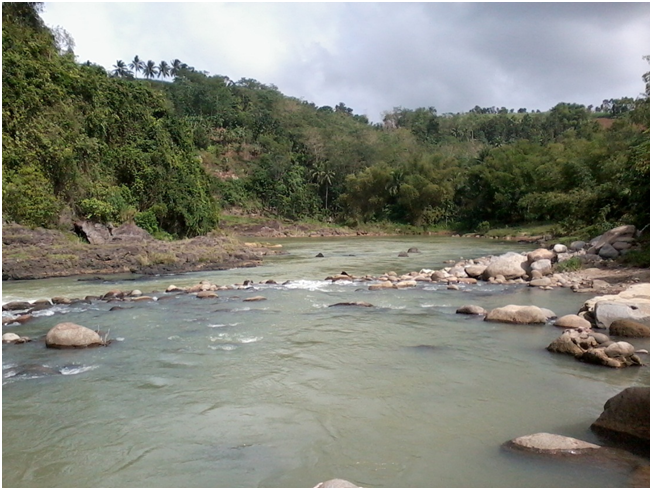
Himoga-an River

Sagay can be identified in the map of Negros Occidental because of its "ice-cream cone" shape sliced from the northern tip of Negros. It is bounded in the north by Asuncion Pass and the Visayan Sea; the city of Talisay, the municipality of Calatrava in the south; cities of Cadiz and Silay in the west and the city of Escalante and municipality of Toboso in the east. It is 82 kilometres (51 mi) from Bacolod.

=== Barangays ===
Sagay is politically subdivided into 25 barangays. Each barangay consists of puroks and some have sitios.

- Andres Bonifacio
- Bato
- Baviera
- Bulanon
- Campo Himoga-an
- Campo Santiago
- Colonia Divina
- Rafaela Barrera
- Fabrica
- General Luna
- Himoga-an Baybay
- Lopez Jaena
- Malubon
- Maquiling
- Molocaboc
- Old Sagay
- Paraiso
- Plaridel
- Poblacion I (Barangay 1)
- Poblacion II (Barangay 2)
- Puey
- Rizal
- Taba-ao
- Tadlong
- Vito

==== Andres Bonifacio ====
Andres Bonifacio became a barrio in the late 60s; once called Sitio Maasin. It was the largest sitio of Barrio Vito and contributed a huge income because of its lime quarries and vast land area. The separation of Andres Bonifacio from Vito was materialized through land donation of the barrio and school sites by the family of Carlos and Elea Canoy-Esperancilla. It was Canoy-Esperancilla who suggested to name the new barrio Andres Bonifacio in honor of the Filipino hero. It is also noted for its natural and man-made caves.

==== Bato ====
Sometime in 1929, Bato, then a forested land with few inhabitants was a place of gathering of people living in the hinterlands. There used to be a place called “tabu”, where people from the hinterlands meet for recreation like cockfighting (“tari”) or horse fighting in a clearing area near the Himoga-an River where a big rock (“bato”) was a landmark. The place was also used by the people during “tabu”, a day set by them for marketing or bartering their products. For the few residents of the place, this clearing also served as a place of recreation. For people who visited the place for recreation or for economic reasons, they named the place Bato because of the big rock.

==== Baviera ====
Baviera was once covered with thick forest where wild pigs and other wild animals abound in this area. It is located in the southwestern part at the foot of Sherman Hill. Before the Second World War, tall big trees were cut down by workers of the Insular Lumber Co. for it was under the concession with the Philippine Government. After leaving the area, sometime in 1932, a businessman by the name of Fausto Baviera cleared the area by making kaingins and planted the place with root crops, rice, cassava and others. Being a businessman he likewise gathered products like rattan, hagnaya and balao and sold these products in Paraiso, a progressive barangay of Sagay.

==== Bulanon ====
During the pre-Spanish time, the village was inhabited by various non-Christian tribes who were independent of and hostile towards each other. The known history of Barangay Bulanon started sometime in the year 1880 when the Spanish conquistadores first founded a settlement of non-Christian Filipinos near the twin big rivers. The village was originally named Arguelles after father Arguelles, the founder of the said settlement. The place later became the first pueblo.

==== Campo Himoga-an ====
Campo Himoga-an got its name from the word “campo” which means “Camp” of the Insular Lumber Co. (ILCO) personnel, where housing, a canteen, bodega and locomotive water tank were constructed while Himoga-an was taken from the name of the river traversing the place was located. Literally, Campo Himoga-an is a camp of laborer residents. In 1935, after the camp was completed, a civic- minded citizen named Simeon Templado, convinced all parents in the camp to have a school for their children, and a school building was constructed by way of self-help cooperation. Later, they organized the Parent-Teacher Association in which Templado became president. With his leadership, the PTA passed a resolution requesting the local government of Sagay to release a donation of four hectares of land for the school site and public plaza. The resolution was indorsed by the local government of Sagay to the Bureau of Land which later approved the proposal and survey was then conducted. Upon completion of the survey, another PTA resolution was passed requesting for the declaration of Campo Himoga-an as one of the barrios of Sagay. After several months, the Municipality of Sagay approved the proposal and declared Campo Himoga-an as a new barrio of Sagay.

==== Colonia Divina ====
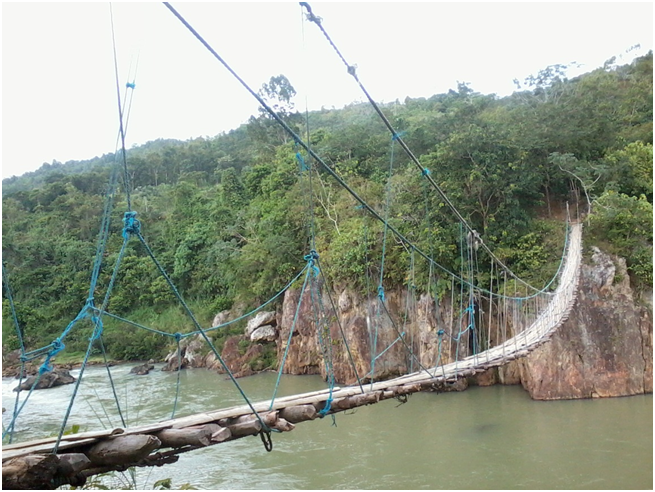
The century-old Inangtan Hanging Bridge over the Himogaan River situated near the boundaries of Brgy. Colonia Divina and Brgy. Puey.

In 1957, Retired Reverend Dr. Roberto G. Mahilum, who was called Master and Father and Founder of a Trinitarian Religious Organization, legally known as the ALAPH DIVINE TEMPLE, duly established and organized in accordance with the laws of the Republic of the Philippines, teaching the doctrine of the Holy Trinity, ventured himself together with a group of his adherents and settled in the vicinity of Barangay Campo Santiago which they called Colonia Divina. On May 2, 1963, through Municipal Resolution #59 of the Municipal Council of Sagay, petitioned the Provincial Board of Negros Occidental to declare Colonia Divina as a Chartered Barrio. Then, on July 19, 1963, Colonia Divina became a Chartered Barrio as per Resolution #614 of the Provincial Board of Negros Occidental.

==== Fabrica ====
The name FABRICA refers to lumber factory or sawmill. It was told, that when a group of visiting Americans/ Europeans asked about the place the local residents just answered “Pabrica” referring to the mill itself (not knowing exactly what was being asked). However, with their American accent instead of Pabrica they pronounced it “FABRICA” since then the place bears that name.

==== General Luna ====
The recorded history of Barangay General Luna started in 1929, when the Insular Lumber Company began its logging operation in the area. The inhabitants followed to clear the area and began cultivating the land with rice and corn. The families with big clearings are the Duncaras and the Piccios. They donated portion of their cleared land to the government for the barrio and the school site, Later they named the new barangay after General Luna, one of the prominent Filipino heroes.

==== Lopez Jaena ====
Barangay Lopez Jaena is located in the eastern part of Sagay. The history of the barangay dates back in 1902, which started as a very small settlement. Missionaries from foreign lands came and found out that this place was scarcely populated. The place was covered with big trees or forest. Among the first residents was Pedro Paculba and was considered as the most respected person in this place. He named this place “Lopez Jaena” in honor of Graciano Lopez Jaena, an Ilonggo hero who was recognized for his great contribution to the history of the country. The Missionaries brought about changes especially in the educational and religious aspect in the life of the people. At that time the head of the people was called “ Cabeza del Barrio “. Education had given them opportunities in finding means to improve their ways of living. School was established and the first teachers were mostly missionaries. All of the leaders have contributed their part in transforming this place into a big settlement. There was intermingling of dialects. Many have established permanent dwellings in this place. This barangay was also awarded the cleanest barrio in Sagay, under the leadership of Felix Rodillado, who at that time was the Barrio Lieutenant or Teniente del Barrio.

==== Malubon ====
The term “Malubon” is an ethnic Negrito term which connotes a white plain area suited to rice farming. As part and parcel of the lumber concession of the defunct Insular Lumber Company (ILCO), Malubon was a heavily forested area. After the rapid cutting of the forest trees, ILCO moved to the upland areas which are still forested leaving Malubon as agricultural area which has become very attractive for settlers and homesteaders. Sometime in the years 1939–40, Malubon was officially organized as a distinct barrio separated from Fabrica. A school was opened to accommodate the educational needs of its children.

==== Maquiling ====
Many years ago, there was a small settlement located in the rolling hills of Sagay. The place was covered with thick vegetation and trees and people come to visit the place and later decided to dwell. These people who first migrated called the place SAPLAD. Later on, through the efforts of a civic-spirited group, a school was built which encouraged more people to settle and owned lands. One of the first settlers was Crispin Maquiling, member of the Philippine Constabulary and who later became the barrio lieutenant. His leadership was looked upon by the people, being their good leader that they decided to name the place Maquiling in his honor.

==== Molocaboc ====
Sometime in the year 1880, the first known settlers in the island were the Abong brothers led by Eusebio Abong popularly known as Kapitan Sebio. They were grown fishermen from Sicogon Island, Carles Iloilo. At that time, the whole island had no name to call on. Kapitan Sebio together with his brothers Francisco and Atong cleared the island and utilized the area as pasture of their herbs. They divided area among themselves the island for them to settle and the most frequent place for gathering is the place of Atong which they called it Cangatong, a Cebuano word which means “it's Atong's place.” Cangatong is a place where a big Mocaboc tree grows that most transient fishermen usually took their siesta time. The said Mocaboc tree is a kind of mangrove that was very famous at that time as medicinal tree. Then, it was Francisco who suggested to name the island Mocaboc after the tree considering the abundance of the species in the island. However, the Spanish authorities cannot pronounce Mocaboc properly so they inserted the syllable “lo” making it Molocaboc. From that time on, the place bore the name Molocaboc and is now noted for various species of mangroves lining its coast and of bubble shell deposit

==== Old Sagay ====
The recorded history of Sagay dates back to the 1860 era when Teniente Francisco Rodriguez and Basilio Cordova founded a small settlement in the mouth of a river known as Bulanon River. The settlement was then called Arguelles. In due time the settlement prospered and became the town proper. Arguelles was the center of commerce and trade in the area for about ten years from the time of its founding. In 1870, the Spanish Governor ordered the transfer of the town site to a bigger and more progressive community, also near the sea. The place was christened “Pueblo de Magallanes, the present site of Barangay Old Sagay. After World War II, the seat of government was transferred to the present Poblacion site, Dalusan but the barangay retained its name as Sagay with the prefix old referring to the old settlement in the coastal area

=== Climate ===
Climate data for Sagay
Month	Jan	Feb	Mar	Apr	May	Jun	Jul	Aug	Sep	Oct	Nov	Dec	Year
Mean daily maximum °C (°F)	28 (82)	29 (84)	30 (86)	32 (90)	31 (88)	30 (86)	29 (84)	30 (86)	29 (84)	29 (84)	29 (84)	28 (82)	30 (85)
Mean daily minimum °C (°F)	23 (73)	23 (73)	23 (73)	24 (75)	25 (77)	25 (77)	25 (77)	25 (77)	25 (77)	24 (75)	24 (75)	24 (75)	24 (75)
Average precipitation mm (inches)	120 (4.7)	87 (3.4)	95 (3.7)	97 (3.8)	187 (7.4)	263 (10.4)	251 (9.9)	220 (8.7)	227 (8.9)	268 (10.6)	220 (8.7)	158 (6.2)	2,193 (86.4)
Average rainy days	16.1	12.6	15.4	16.8	25.8	28.4	29.1	27.9	27.7	28.5	23.9	18.4	270.6
Source: Meteoblue

== Demographics ==
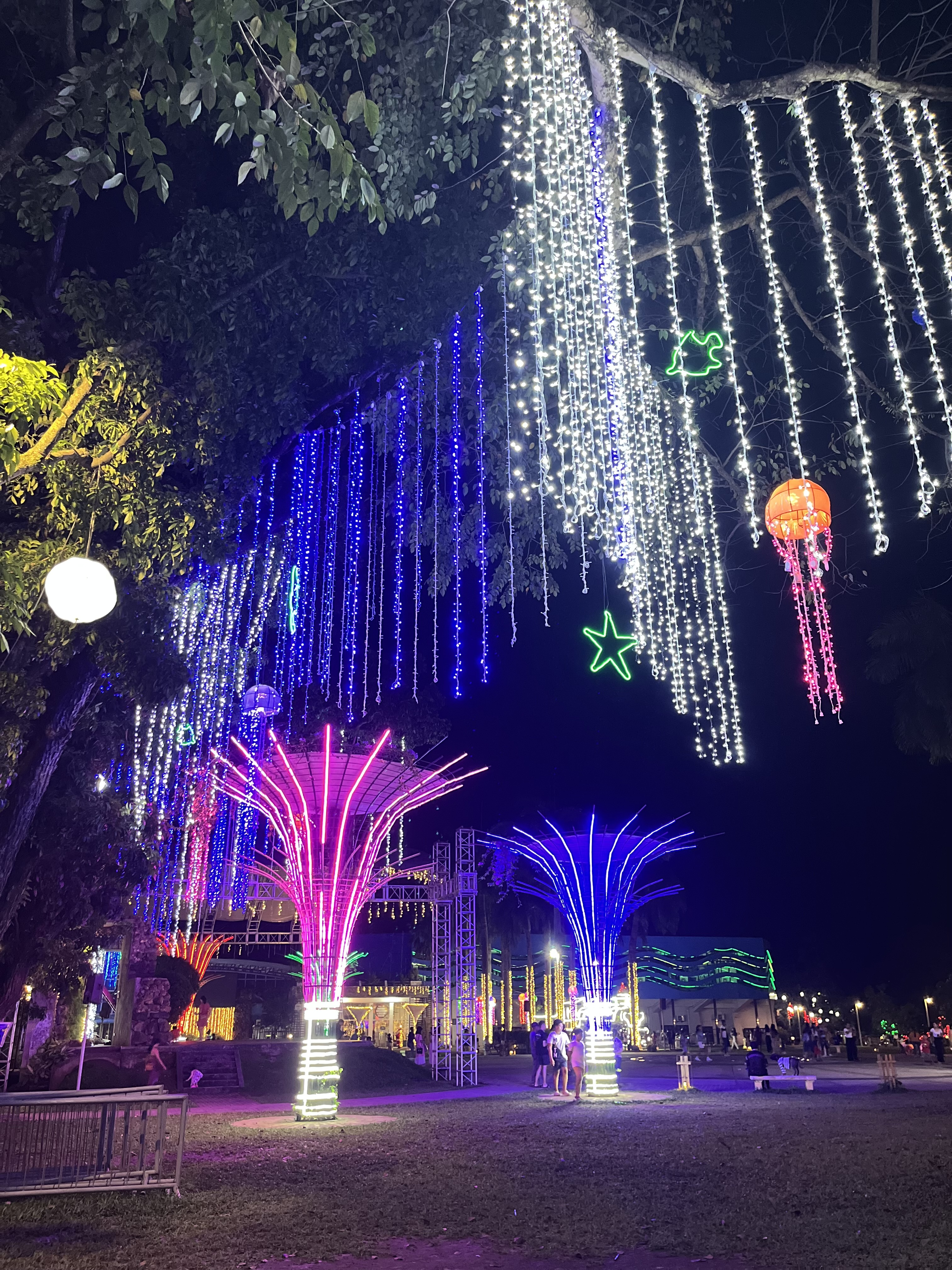
Landscape of Sagay City Public Plaza at night

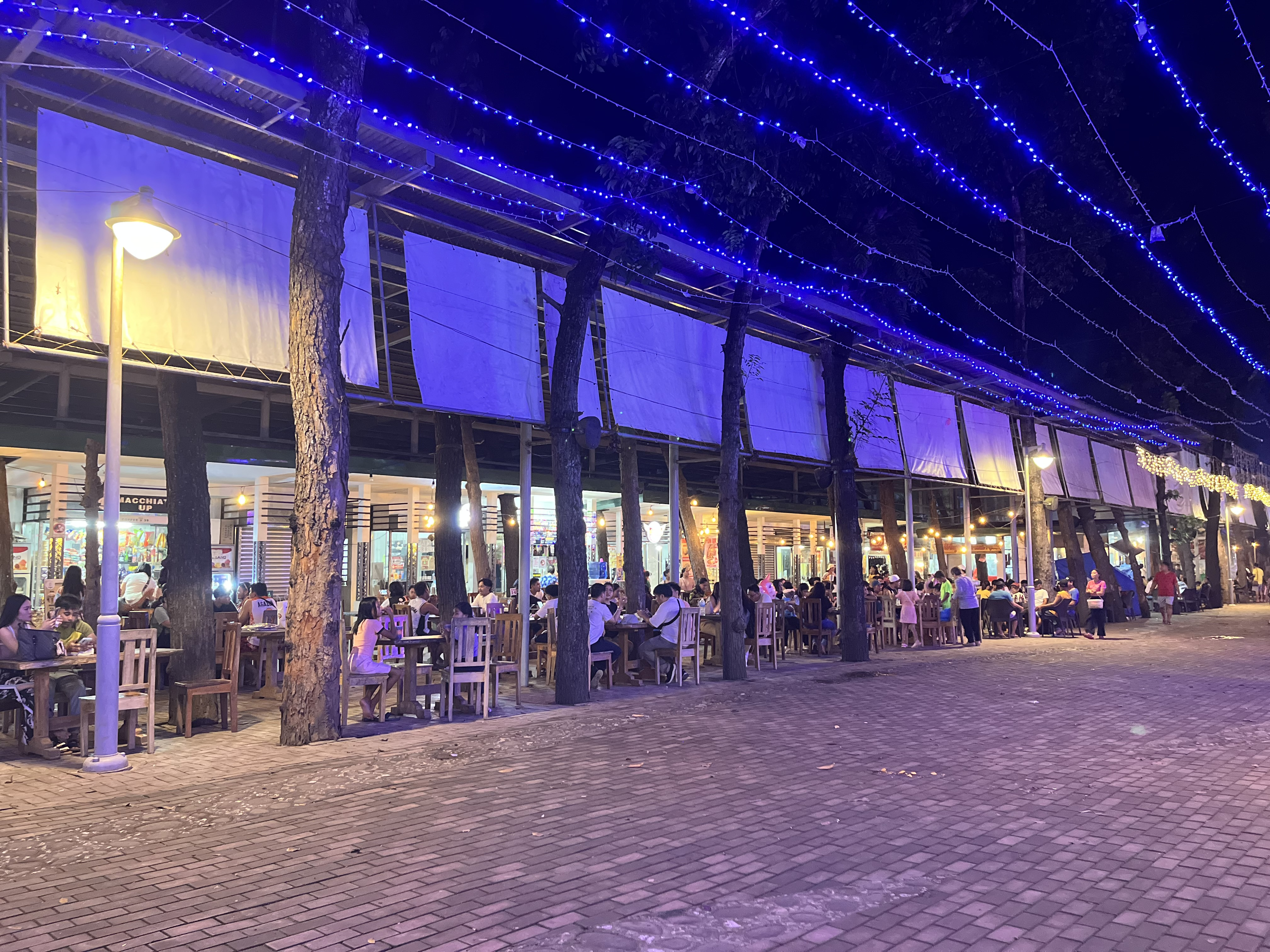
Food kiosks at the Sagay City Public Plaza Promenade

Population census of Sagay
Year	Pop.	±% p.a.
1903	8,311	—
1918	17,752	+5.19%
1939	53,767	+5.42%
1948	67,152	+2.50%
1960	71,335	+0.50%
1970	79,702	+1.11%
1975	95,421	+3.68%
1980	99,118	+0.76%
1990	112,700	+1.29%
1995	128,374	+2.47%
2000	129,765	+0.23%
2007	140,511	+1.10%
2010	140,740	+0.06%
2015	146,264	+0.74%
2020	148,894	+0.38%
2024	152,543	+0.58%
Source: Philippine Statistics Authority

=== Languages ===
Sagay City's inhabitants are known to speak a mixture of Hiligaynon and Cebuano. Tagalog and English are widely used in schools, businesses, and government offices.

== Economy ==
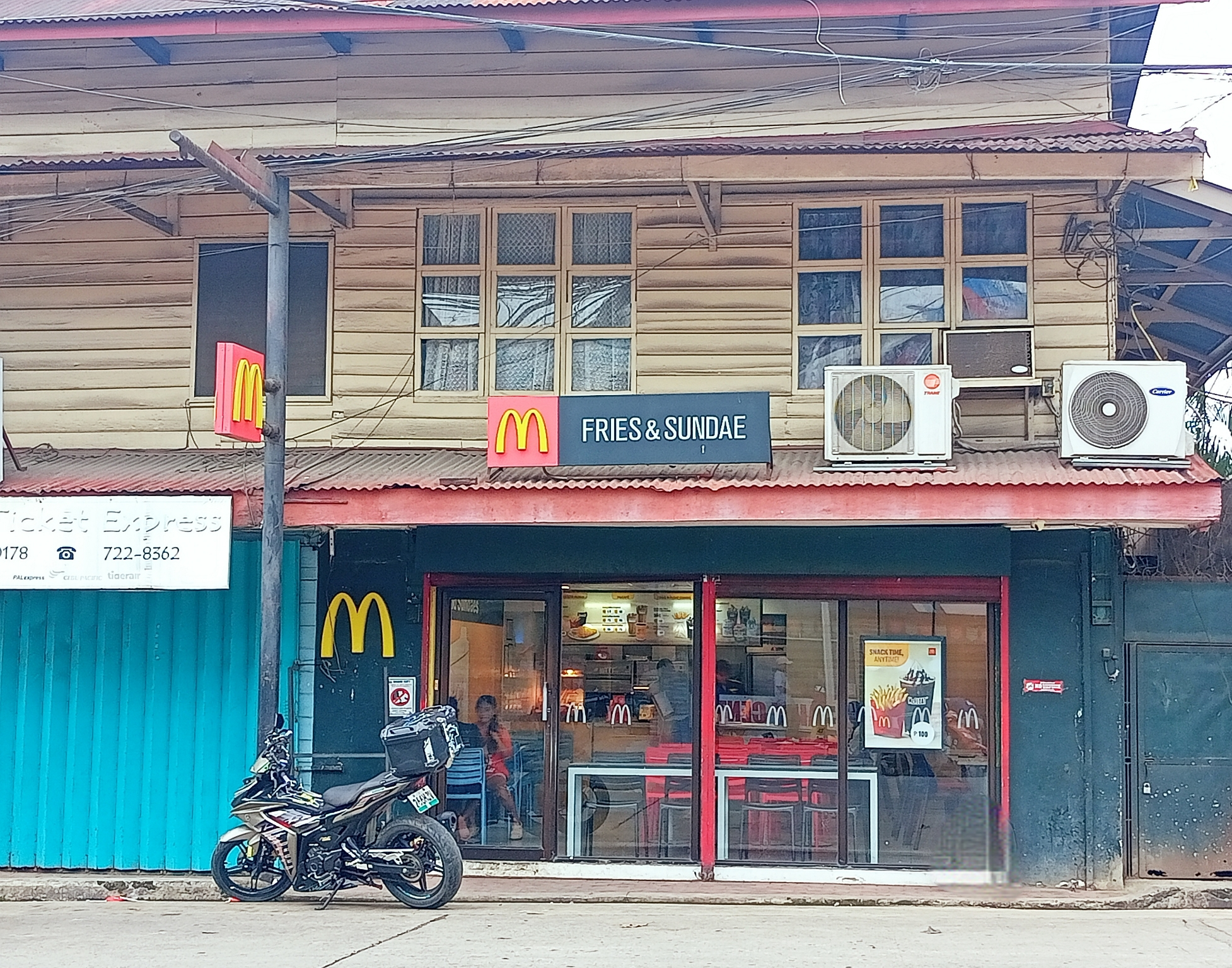
A McDonald's branch in Sagay City

Poverty incidence of Sagay (%)

Source: Philippine Statistics Authority

== Tourism attractions ==
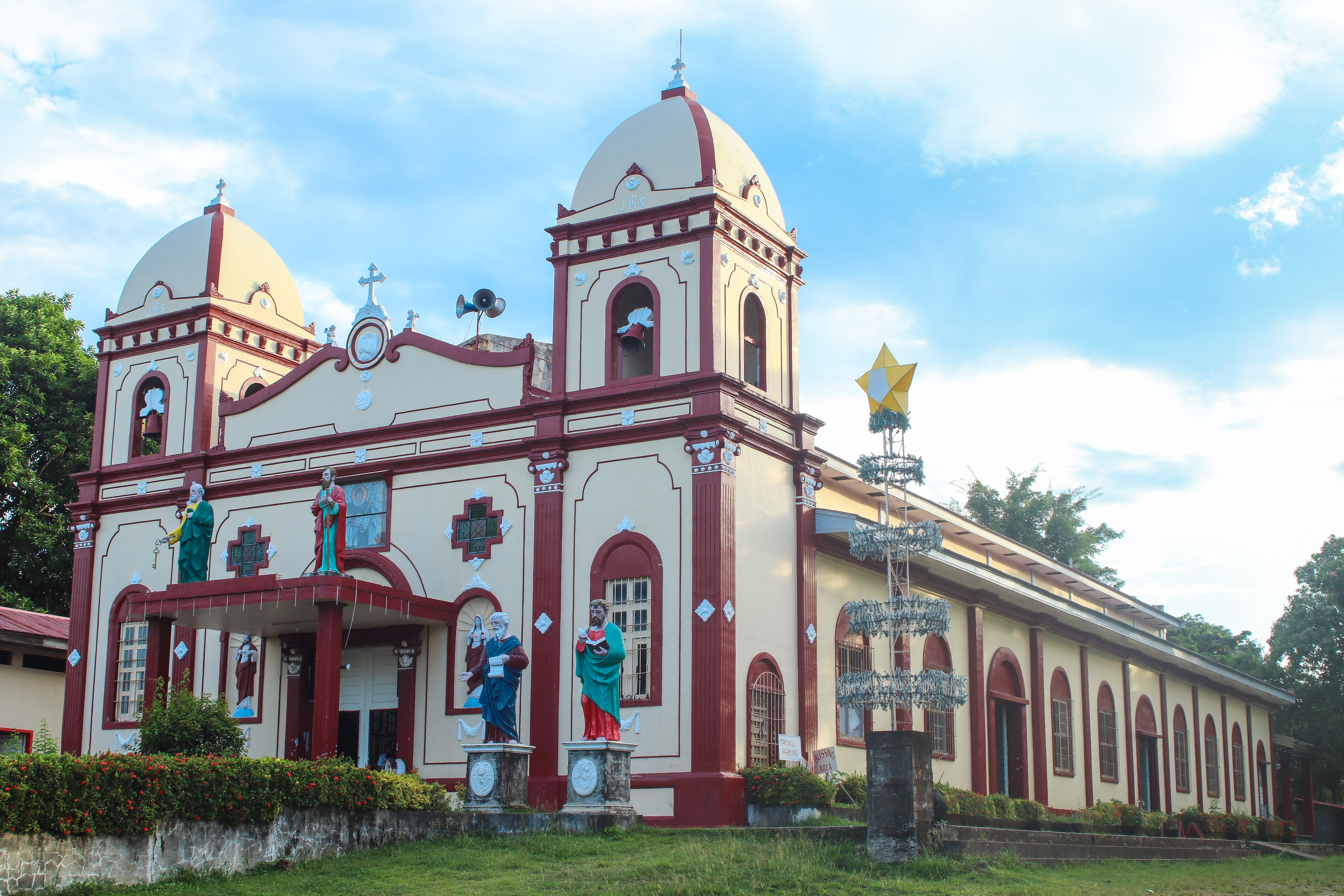
The miraculous St. Vincent Ferrer Parish-Shrine (also locally and popularly known as "Vito Church")

- Sagay Marine Reserve
  - Carbin Reef
  - Panal Reef
  - Macahulom Reef
- Suyac Island Mangrove Eco-Park
- Molocaboc Island
- Himogaan River is the longest river of Sagay City.
- Inangtan Hanging Bridge
- The Legendary Siete
- San Vicente Ferrer Church (Vito Church)
- Lady's Circle Garden and Living tree museum
- Museo Sang Bata sa Negros children's museum

== Festivals ==
- Feast of St. Joseph & Sinigayan Festival (March 19)
- Feast of San Vicente Ferrer, Vito (May 1–2)
- Charter Day Anniversary (June 11)

== Notable personalities ==
- Amado Bagatsing – Member of the House of Representatives of the Philippines from Manila’s 5th congressional district
- Cristal Bagatsing – Member of the House of Representatives of the Philippines from Manila’s 5th congressional district
- Don Juan Bagatsing – Member of the Manila City Council
- Hyram Bagatsing – professional basketball player
- Ramon Bagatsing – Member of the House of Representatives of the Philippines from Manila’s 3rd congressional district, longest serving and 19th Mayor of Manila
- Raymond Bagatsing – film and television actor
- RK Bagatsing – film and television actor
- Sonia Bruce – Bowls player, bronze medalist at the 2016 World Outdoor Bowls Championship
- Francisco Chavez – 25th Solicitor General of the Philippines
- Louie Galbines – 3rd Bishop of the Roman Catholic Diocese of Kabankalan
- Ainie Knight – Bowls player, bronze medalist World Bowls Championship
- Ronnie Lazaro – Theatre film and television actor, producer, casting director and art director
- Alfredo Marañon – Member of the Philippine House of Representatives, 41st Governor of Negros Occidental
- Alfredo Marañon III – Member of the Philippine House of Representatives
- Rona Mahilum – child hero who saved her 5 siblings from a fire in their home in Barangay Colonia Divina
- Enrique Ona – 29th Secretary of Health (Philippines)
- Mark Yee – Professional basketball player

== See also ==
- Sagay massacre
- List of renamed cities and municipalities in the Philippines
- State University of Northern Negros
