= DYMI =

Radio station in Iloilo, Philippines

Spirit FM Calinog (DYMI)
- Calinog; Philippines
- Broadcast area: Central Panay
- Frequency: 94.7 MHz
- Branding: 94.7 Spirit FM

Programming
- Languages: Hiligaynon, Filipino, English
- Format: Contemporary MOR, OPM, Religious Radio
- Affiliations: Catholic Media Network

Ownership
- Owner: Archdiocese of Jaro; (Global Broadcasting System)

History
- First air date: 1998
- Former names: Shine Radio

Technical information
- Licensing authority: NTC
- Power: 5 kW

94.7 Spirit FM (DYMI 94.7 MHz) is an FM station owned and operated by the Archdiocese of Jaro under Global Broadcasting System. Its studios and transmitter are located at Marikudo Hills, Sunshine Valley, Brgy. Simsiman, Calinog.
