= Alfredo Marañon =

Philippine politician (1935–2020)

Alfredo G. Marañon Jr.
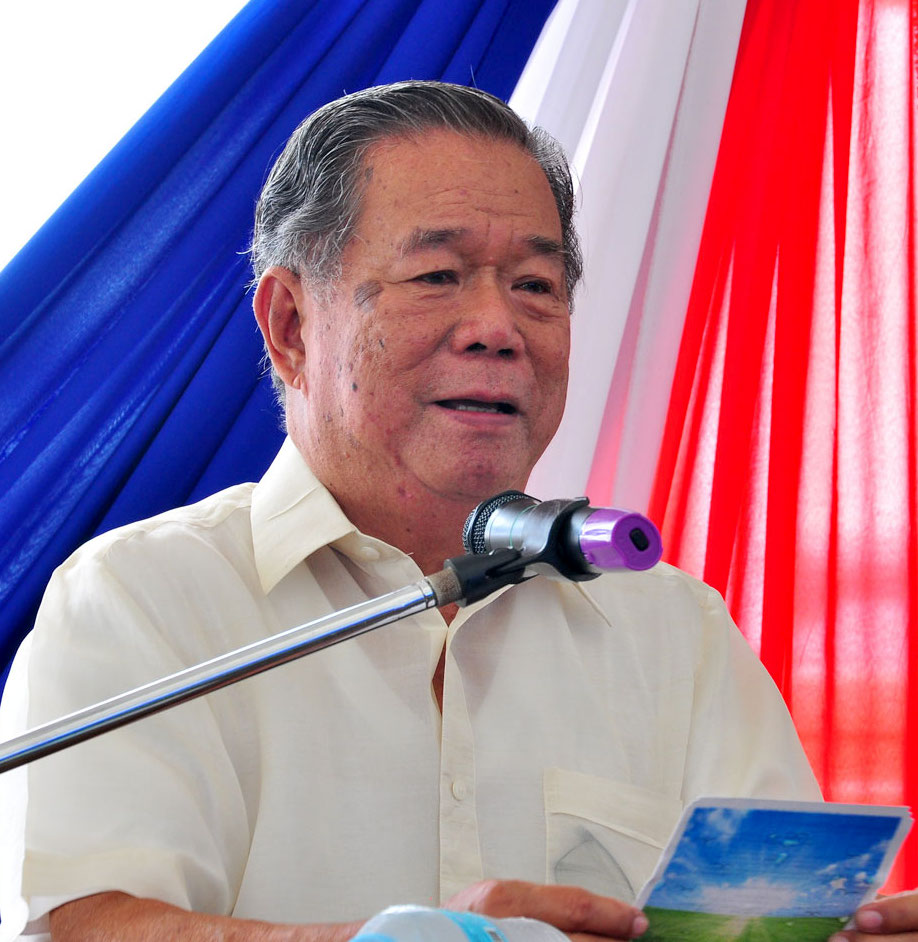
- Marañon in 2015

41st Governor of Negros Occidental
- In office June 30, 2010 – June 30, 2019
- Vice Governor: Genaro Alvarez (2010–13); Eugenio Jose Lacson (2013–19)
- Preceded by: Isidro Zayco
- Succeeded by: Eugenio Jose Lacson

Mayor of Sagay City
- In office June 30, 2004 – June 30, 2010
- Preceded by: Joseph Marañon
- Succeeded by: Rafael Cueva

Member of Philippine House of Representatives from Negros Occidental's 2nd congressional district
- In office June 30, 1995 – June 30, 2004
- Preceded by: Manuel Puey
- Succeeded by: Alfredo Marañon III

Mambabatas Pambansa (Assemblyman) from Negros Occidental
- In office June 30, 1984 – March 25, 1986

Personal details
- Born: Alfredo Galicia Marañon Jr. December 21, 1935 Sagay, Negros Occidental, Philippine Commonwealth
- Died: October 1, 2020 (aged 84) Bacolod, Philippines
- Resting place: Heavenly Hills Memorial Park and Gardens; Sagay City, Negros Occidental, Philippines
- Party: PDP–Laban (2016–2020); UNEGA (local party; 1998–2020)
- Other political affiliations: NPC (2009–2016); Lakas (1995–2009); KBL (1984–1995)
- Spouse: Marilyn Dalisay-Marañon
- Children: 7 (including Alfredo III)
- Education: De La Salle University, Manila; University of Negros Occidental – Recoletos

Alfredo Galicia Marañon Jr. (December 21, 1935 – October 1, 2020) was a Filipino politician from Sagay City who served as Governor of Negros Occidental from 2010 to 2019.

== Personal life ==
Marañon, also known as "Freddie" by his peers, was the third child of the late Alfredo Espinosa Marañon Sr. of Mandurriao, Iloilo and the late Salvacion Galicia Marañon of Sagay City. He was the brother of former Governor Joseph G. Maranon. His wife is Marilyn Andres Dalisay-Marañon of Looc, Romblon. His son is politician Alfredo "Thirdy" D. Marañon III. He was a farmer, civil engineer and aquaculturist by profession.

Marañon attained his Bachelor of Science in Civil Engineering degree at De La Salle University, Manila. He attended the University of Negros Occidental-Recoletos in Bacolod and Sagay Elementary School for his secondary and elementary education.

Marañon died of cardiac health problems in a hospital in Bacolod on October 1, 2020, aged 84.

== Political career ==
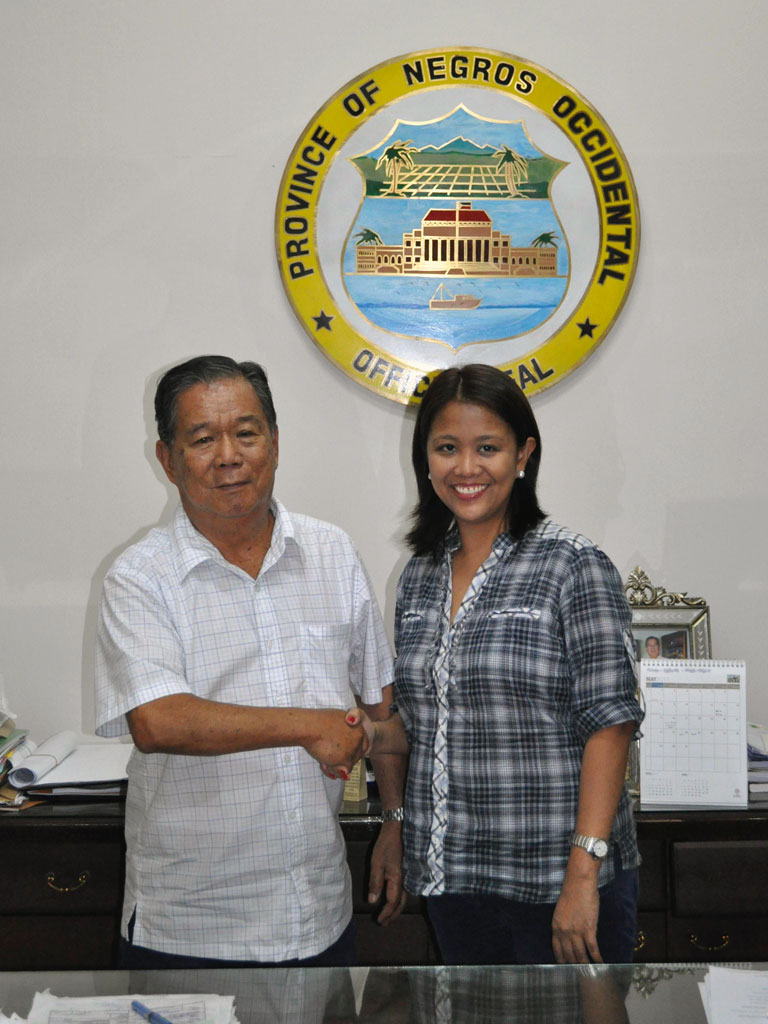
Marañon (left) and future Senator Nancy Binay (right) in 2011

Marañon started his political career in 1964, when he became a municipal councilor of Sagay. He later served as vice mayor and eventually mayor of Sagay, a post held previously by his older brother, the late Gov. Joseph G. Marañon. He assumed office as Governor of Negros Occidental on June 30, 2010, implementing the Negros First! strategic development plan for the province. Negros First! seeks to optimize the potentials of Negros Occidental as an agricultural province to ensure food sufficiency and agricultural productivity as well as generate livelihood for the poor and marginalized. His term in office ended in 2019.

Political offices
Preceded by Isidro Zayco	Governor of Negros Occidental; 2010–2019	Succeeded by Eugenio Jose Lacson
Preceded by Joseph Marañon	Mayor of Sagay, Negros Occidental; 2001–2010	Succeeded by Rafael Cueva
