= Iloilo State University of Fisheries Science and Technology =

Public university in Iloilo, Philippines

- Pamantasang Estado ng Iloilo sa Agham at Teknolohiya (Filipino); Iloilo Universidad Estatal de Ciencia y Tecnología (Spanish)
- Former names: Central Iloilo National School of Fisheries (CINSOF); Iloilo National School of Fisheries (INSOF); Iloilo Regional School of Fisheries (IRSOF); Iloilo State College of Fisheries (ISCOF)
- Motto: Creativity, Diligence, Perseverance, Innovation
- Type: State university
- Established: 1957
- Affiliations: SCUAA
- President: Dr. Nordy D. Siason Jr.
- Vice-president: Dr. Joan M. Belga (Vice President for Academic Affairs) Dr. Johnny B. Dolor (Vice President for Administration)
- Location: Barotac Nuevo, Iloilo, Philippines; 10°55′58″N 122°44′00″E
- Campus: Rural/Semi-Urban: Tiwi/Poblacion
- Colours
- Website: isufst.edu.ph
- Location in the Visayas Location in the Philippines

The Iloilo State University of Fisheries Science and Technology (ISUFST; Filipino: Pamantasang Pampamahalaan ng Iloilo sa Pangisdaang Sensya at Teknolohiya) is a public college in the Philippines. It is mandated to provide higher technological, professional and vocational instruction and training in fisheries, science, as well as short-term technical or vocational courses in fisheries. It is also mandated to promote research, advance studies, extension work, and leadership in its areas of specialization. Its main campus is located in Barangay Tiwi, Barotac Nuevo, Iloilo. There are other campuses in Barotac Nuevo (formerly known as Barotac Nuevo Polytechnic Institute), Dingle, Dumangas (formerly known as the Dumangas Polytechnic College) and San Enrique. DYIS at 106.7 FM is a music and educational FM radio station operated by ISCOF at their main campus.

On January 10, 2023, Iloilo State College of Fisheries has been converted to a university thus adopting its present name, Iloilo State University of Fisheries Science and Technology.

== History ==
ISUST was established on 16 June 1947 as Barotac Nuevo Junior High School, which was opened for the first and second year. It held its first commencement exercises on 25 March 1949. On 22 June 1957, it was converted into Central Iloilo National School of Fisheries (CINSOF) by virtue of RA 1925. On 19 June 1961, it was renamed Iloilo National School of Fisheries (INSOF) and, on 20 June 1963, it was converted into Iloilo Regional School of Fisheries (IRSOF) by virtue of RA 3521. On 21 August 1978, then President Ferdinand Marcos signed PD 1523 converting IRSOF into Iloilo State College of Fisheries (ISCOF). On 22 August 2000, RA 8760 and CHED Memorandum Nos. 27 and 27-A integrated CHED-Supervised Institutions (CSIs) of Barotac Nuevo, Dingle, Dumangas, and San Enrique, Iloilo into the system. On 11 June 2013, President Benigno Aquino III signed RA 10604 converting Iloilo State College of Fisheries into Iloilo State University of Fisheries Science and Technology.

=== Founder ===
Dr. Ferjenel Biron is the Founding Father of the University under RA 10604. The University main campus is shared by ISUFST at Poblacion (ISUST-Main Poblacion) in J.T. Bretana Street, yet the ISUFST in Tiwi (ISUFST-Main Tiwi) remains the biggest campus of the ISUFST System.

== Mandate ==
It is mandated to provide advanced education, higher technological, professional instruction and training in fisheries technology, arts and sciences, education, industrial technology, engineering, aquaculture, seaweed farming, and other related fields of study relevant to national development. It undertakes research, extension services and production activities in support of the development of the Iloilo Province and provide progressive leadership in its areas of specialisation.

== Colleges ==
ISUFST consists five colleges that provide instruction in basic education all the way up to the post-graduate levels. In the undergraduate and graduate levels, its covered disciplines include the Computer Studies, Education, Fisheries, HRM, Marine Biology, Nautical Studies, and Tourism. Its School of Graduate Studies offers Master in Instructional Leadership (English, Social Science, Science, and Mathematics), Master in Local Governance, Master of Arts in Educational Management, Master in Fisheries Technology, Doctor of Rural Development, Doctor of Fisheries Technology, and Doctor of Philosophy (Educational Technology).

== Presidents ==
Executive	Title	Term
Amedeo Timbol	Principal	
Elpidio Icamina	President	August 21, 1978 – August 31, 1987
Benigno Panistante	President	September 1, 1987 – August 31, 1993
Elpidio Locsin, Jr.	President	September 1, 1993 – March 31, 2006
Rosario Panes	President	April 1, 2006 – September 30, 2010
Ramon Zarceno	President	October 1, 2010 – December 31, 2016

== Other External Campuses ==
ISUST has other campuses at:

- Dingle (ISUFST-Dingle),
- Dumangas (ISUFST-Dumangas),
- San Enrique (ISUFST-San Enrique).

== See also ==
- DYIS106.7 MHz FM Radyo Ugyon
