= Bong Lacson =

Filipino politician

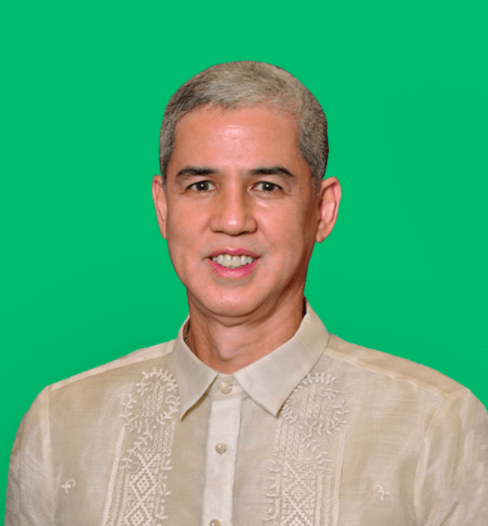
- Official portrait, 2019

42nd Governor of Negros Occidental
- Incumbent
- Assumed office June 30, 2019
- Vice Governor: Jeffrey Ferrer (2019–25); Jose Benito Alonso (2025–present)
- Preceded by: Alfredo Marañon

Vice Governor of Negros Occidental
- In office June 30, 2013 – June 30, 2019
- Governor: Alfredo Marañon
- Preceded by: Genaro Alvarez
- Succeeded by: Jeffrey Ferrer

Mayor of San Carlos, Negros Occidental
- In office June 30, 2001 – June 30, 2010
- Preceded by: Rogelio Debulgado
- Succeeded by: Gerardo P. Valmayor Jr.

Personal details
- Born: Eugenio José Villareal Lacson; December 13, 1959 (age 66) Manapla, Negros Occidental, Philippines
- Party: NPC (2001–present)
- Other political affiliations: UNEGA (2004–2007)
- Spouse: Anna Lourdes Puyat
- Domestic partner: Emily Yanson
- Relations: Manuel Victor Lacson (father); Carmen Villareal (mother)
- Children: 2

Eugenio José "Bong" Villarreal Lacson (Tagalog: [juˈhɛɲo hoˈsɛ vɪljarɛˈɐl ˈlɐkson]) is a Filipino politician who has served as the 42nd governor of Negros Occidental since 2019. A member of the Nationalist People's Coalition, he previously served as the province's vice governor from 2013 to 2019, and was the mayor of San Carlos, Negros Occidental, from 2001 to 2010.

== Life and career ==
Lacson served three consecutive terms as the mayor of his native San Carlos, Negros Occidental. In the 2013 elections, he ran as the running mate of Genaro Alvarez, a former vice governor. While Alvarez lost the gubernatorial election to Alfredo Marañon, he was elected vice governor. As vice governor, he maintained a good relationship with the Governor. He decided not to run against Governor Marañon in the next election, though the governor ran for reelection Jeffrey Ferrer as his running mate, after failed reunification talks between the United Negros Alliance and his coalition, the Love Negros Alliance. In 2019, he was elected governor.

Political offices
Preceded by Alfredo Marañon	Governor of Negros Occidental; 2019–present	Incumbent
Preceded by Genaro Alvarez	Vice Governor of Negros Occidental; 2013–2019	Succeeded by Jeffrey Ferrer
Preceded by Rogelio Debulgado	Mayor of San Carlos, Negros Occidental; 2001–2010	Succeeded by Gerardo Valmayor Jr.
