= DYBQ =

Radio station in Iloilo, Philippines

Radyo Budyong Iloilo (DYBQ)
Iloilo City; Philippines
- Broadcast area: Panay, Northern Negros Island
- Frequency: 981 kHz
- Branding: DYBQ Radyo Budyong

Programming
- Languages: Hiligaynon, Filipino
- Format: Silent
- Network: Radyo Budyong

Ownership
- Owner: Intercontinental Broadcasting Corporation

History
- First air date: 1987
- Last air date: 2010

Technical information
- Licensing authority: NTC
- Power: 10,000 watts
- ERP: 15,000 watts

DYBQ (981 AM) Radyo Budyong is a radio station owned and operated by Intercontinental Broadcasting Corporation. Its studio is located at Datu Puti Subdivision, Brgy. Cubay, Jaro, Iloilo City.
