= DYIS =

Radyo Kahilwayan (DYIS)
- Santa Barbara; Philippines
- Broadcast area: Iloilo, parts of Guimaras
- Frequency: 106.7 MHz
- Branding: Radyo Kahilwayan 106.7

Programming
- Languages: Hiligaynon, Filipino
- Format: News, Public Affairs, Talk, Government Radio
- Affiliations: Presidential Broadcast Service

Ownership
- Owner: Municipal Government of Santa Barbara

History
- First air date: 2002
- Former names: ISCOF Radio (2002-2015); Radyo Ugyon (2015-2018)
- Call sign meaning: Iloilo State College of Fisheries (former owner)

Technical information
- Licensing authority: NTC
- Power: 5 kW

Radyo Kahilwayan 106.7 (DYIS 106.7 MHz) is an FM station in the Philippines owned and operated by the Municipal Government of Santa Barbara. Its studios and transmitter are located along Merlo St., Santa Barbara, Iloilo.

== History ==
The station was established in 2002 as ISCOF Radio, a college radio station of Iloilo State College of Fisheries. In 2016, it partnered with the Municipal Government of Santa Barbara & rebranded as Radyo Ugyon. In December 2019, the government of Santa Barbara took over the station's operations & rebranded it as Radyo Kahilwayan. It is currently an affiliate of the Presidential Broadcast Service.
