= DYDA =

Radio station in Iloilo City, The Philippines

ADG Radio (DYDA)
- Iloilo City; Philippines
- Broadcast area: Iloilo, Guimaras and surrounding areas
- Frequency: 1053 kHz
- Branding: DYDA 1053 Ang Dios Gugma

Programming
- Languages: Hiligaynon, Filipino
- Format: Religious Radio
- Affiliations: Catholic Media Network

Ownership
- Owner: Deus Amor Est Broadcasting, Inc.

History
- First air date: December 30, 1965
- Former call signs: DYSA (1965–2021)
- Call sign meaning: Deus Amor Est

Technical information
- Licensing authority: NTC
- Power: 5 kW

Links
- Webcast: Listen Live
- Website: www.angdiosgugma.com

DYDA (1053 AM) ADG Radio is a radio station owned and operated by Deus Amor Est Broadcasting Inc., the broadcast arm of Ang Dios Gugma Catholic Ministries. Its studios are located at ADG Formation Center, Brgy. Hibao-an Norte, Mandurriao District, Iloilo City, and its transmitter is located at Brgy. Navais, Mandurriao District, Iloilo City.
