= DYOK =

Radio station in Iloilo City, Philippines

Aksyon Radyo Iloilo (DYOK)
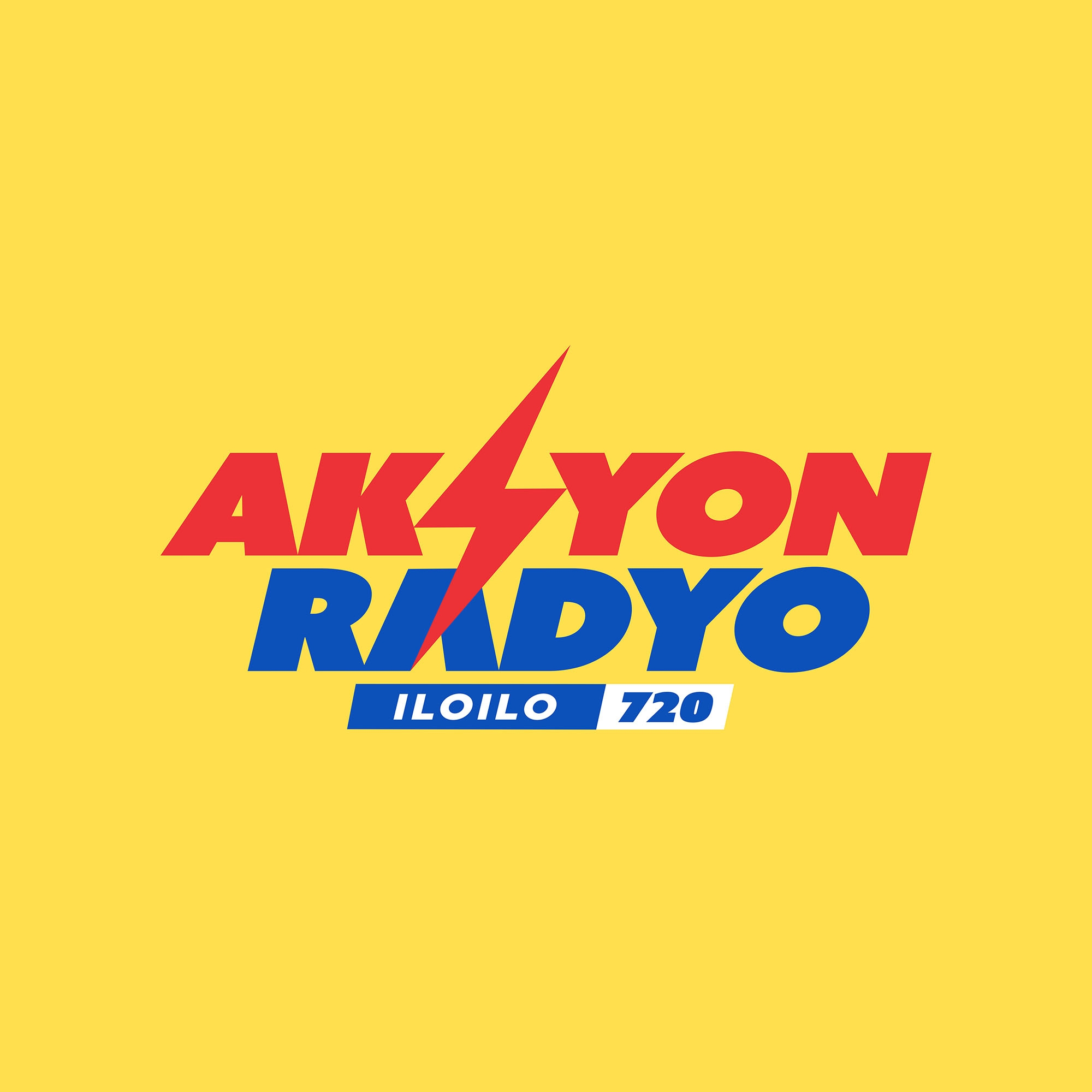
- Iloilo City; Philippines
- Broadcast area: Iloilo, Guimaras and surrounding areas
- Frequency: 720 kHz
- Branding: DYOK Aksyon Radyo

Programming
- Languages: Hiligaynon, Filipino
- Format: News, Public Affairs, Talk, Drama
- Network: Aksyon Radyo

Ownership
- Owner: MBC Media Group
- Sister stations: DZRH Iloilo, 92.3 Easy Rock, 97.5 Love Radio

History
- First air date: September 16, 1991
- Former names: Radyo Balita (1991–1994); Radyo Owang (1994–1999)

Technical information
- Licensing authority: NTC
- Class: B
- Power: 10,000 watts
- ERP: 20,000 watts

Links
- Webcast: Listen Live (via eRadioPortal); Listen and Watch Live (via Facebook Live, Selected programs only); Listen and Watch Live (via YouTube Live, Selected programs only)
- Website: Aksyon Radyo Iloilo

DYOK (720 AM) Aksyon Radyo is a radio station owned and operated by MBC Media Group. Its studio is located at the 3rd floor, Carlos Uy Building, Benigno Aquino Avenue corner Diversion Road, Barangay San Rafael, Mandurriao, Iloilo City, while its transmitter is located in Barangay Nabitasan, La Paz, Iloilo City, sharing tower site with sister station DYDH-AM.
