= DYYS =

Radio station in Iloilo City, Philippines

Easy Rock Iloilo (DYYS)
- Iloilo City; Philippines
- Broadcast area: Iloilo, Guimaras and surrounding areas
- Frequency: 92.3 MHz
- Branding: 92.3 Easy Rock

Programming
- Language: English
- Format: Soft adult contemporary
- Network: Easy Rock

Ownership
- Owner: MBC Media Group
- Operator: BroadReach Broadcasting Corporation
- Sister stations: DYOK Aksyon Radyo, DZRH Iloilo, 97.5 Love Radio

History
- First air date: 1995
- Former names: Showbiz Tsismis (1995-1998); Yes FM (1999-2009)
- Call sign meaning: Yes FM (former branding)

Technical information
- Licensing authority: NTC
- Class: A, B, C
- Power: 5,000 watts

Links
- Webcast: Listen Live; Listen Live 2
- Website: Easy Rock Iloilo; Easy Rock Iloilo 2

DYYS (92.3 FM), broadcasting as 92.3 Easy Rock, is a radio station owned by MBC Media Group and operated by BroadReach Broadcasting Corporation. Its studio and transmitter are located at the 5th floor, Kahirup Bldg., Guanco St., Iloilo City.

== History ==
The station was inaugurated in 1995 in Miagao under the call letters DYST, as a relay station of Showbiz Tsismis based in Manila. In 1999, it rebranded as Yes FM, changed its call letters to DYYS, and adopted a mass-based format. It transferred to Jaro Plaza. Initially having its own set of DJs, in 2002, it went to full automation. At the same time, it moved to Guanco St.

On July 1 2009, it rebranded as 92.3 Easy Rock and adopted a soft adult contemporary format. Since September 2018, it has its own set of DJs, such as Jay Perillo (formerly from Easy Rock Manila).
