= DYMK =

Radio station in Iloilo City, Philippines

Barangay LS Iloilo (DYMK)
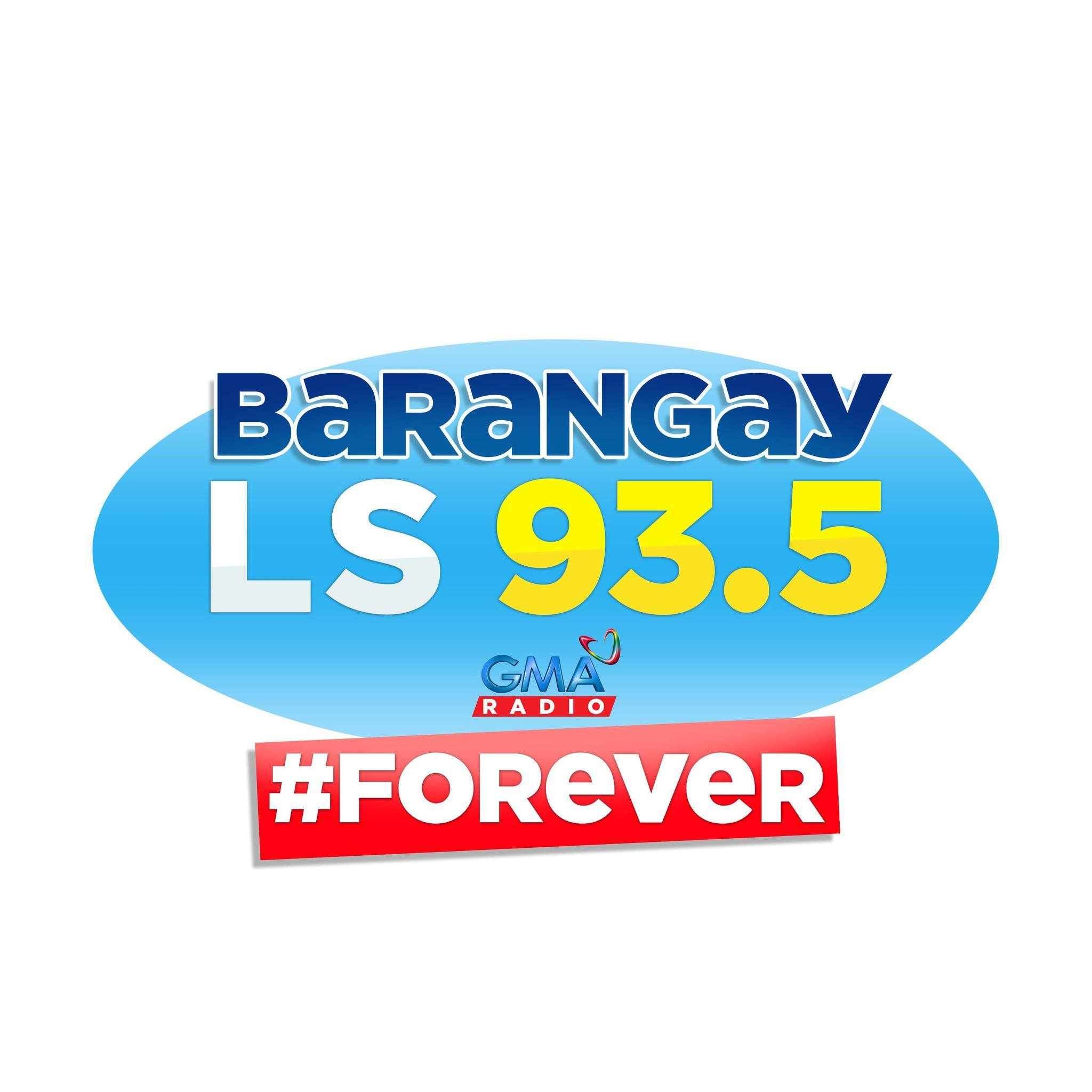
- Iloilo City; Philippines
- Broadcast area: Iloilo, Guimaras and surrounding areas
- Frequency: 93.5 MHz
- Branding: Barangay LS 93.5

Programming
- Languages: Hiligaynon, Filipino
- Format: Contemporary MOR, OPM
- Network: Barangay LS

Ownership
- Owner: GMA Network Inc.
- Sister stations: GMA Super Radyo DYSI 1323; GMA TV-6 Iloilo; GTV 28 Iloilo

History
- First air date: 1980
- Former call signs: DYXI (1980–1985)
- Former names: DYXI (1980–1985); K-Lite 93.5 MK (1985–1989); 93.5 MK (1989-1997); Campus Radio (1997-February 16, 2014)

Technical information
- Licensing authority: NTC
- Power: 10,000 watts
- ERP: 60,000 watts

Links
- Webcast: Campus Radio Iloilo
- Website: GMANetwork.com

Barangay FM 93.5 logo from 2019 to 2023

DYMK (93.5 FM), broadcasting as Barangay LS 93.5, is a radio station owned and operated by GMA Network. The station's studio is located at the GMA Broadcasting Complex, Phase 5, Alta Tierra Village, Jaro, Iloilo City, and its transmitter is located at the GMA Transmitter Complex, Brgy. Alaguisoc, Jordan, Guimaras.

== History ==
The station was established in 1980 under the call letters DYXI with a smooth jazz format. In 1985, Asia-Pacific Broadcasting Company acquired the station from Allied Broadcasting Center, changed its callsign to DYMK and rebranded it as K-Lite 93.5 MK with an easy listening format. At that time, its transmitter was located in Alta Tierra Village, Jaro. In 1989, GMA acquired the station and rebranded it as 93.5 MK and transferred its transmitter facilities to Jibao-an, Pavia. In 1997, it rebranded as Campus Radio with a mass-based format and an upgraded radio and transmitter equipment. On February 17, 2014, as part of RGMA's brand unifying, the station rebranded as Barangay 93.5. On April 5, 2026, the station adapted the Barangay LS branding from its flagship station.
