= DYDH-AM =

Radio station in Iloilo City, Philippines

DYDH
Relay of DZRH Manila
- Iloilo City; Philippines
- Broadcast area: Iloilo, Guimaras and surrounding areas
- Frequency: 1485 kHz
- Branding: DZRH

Programming
- Language: Filipino
- Format: News, Public Affairs, Talk, Drama

Ownership
- Owner: MBC Media Group; (Pacific Broadcasting System)
- Sister stations: DYOK Aksyon Radyo, 92.3 Easy Rock, 97.5 Love Radio

History
- First air date: 1995
- Former call signs: DYRH (1980s-1998)
- Former frequencies: 1197 kHz (1980s-1995)
- Call sign meaning: Variant of DZRH

Technical information
- Licensing authority: NTC
- Power: 10,000 watts

Links
- Website: dzrhnews.com.ph

DYDH (1485 AM) is a relay station of DZRH, owned and operated by MBC Media Group through its licensee Pacific Broadcasting System. The station's transmitter is located at Nabitasan, Lapaz, Iloilo City, sharing tower site with local Aksyon Radyo.
