= DYWT =

Radio station in Iloilo City, Philippines

Wild FM Iloilo (DYWT)
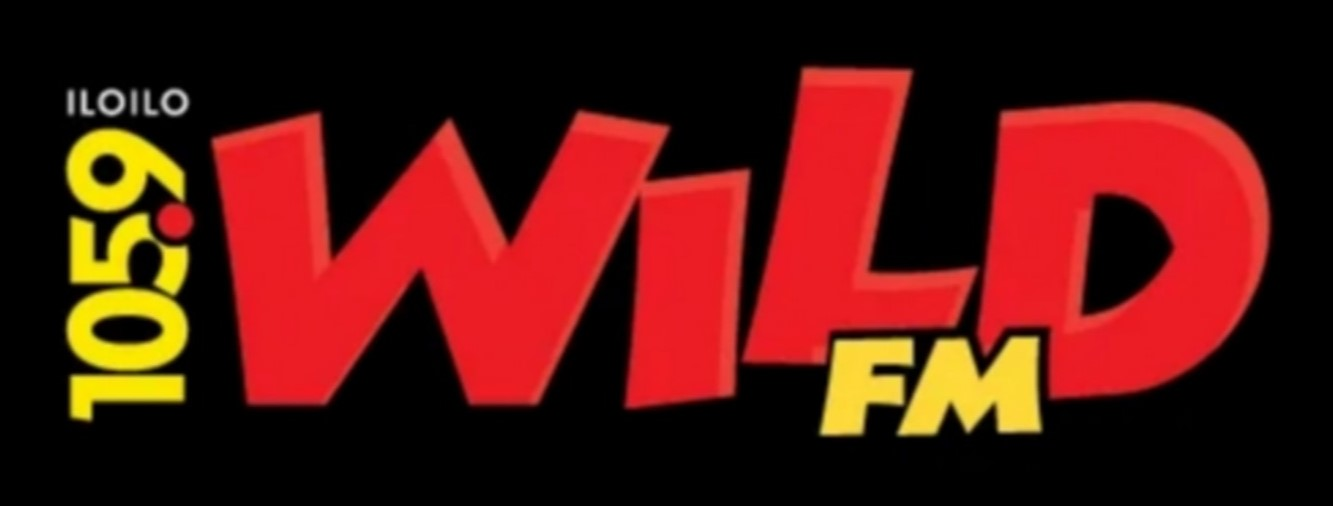
- Logo since 2023
- Iloilo City; Philippines
- Broadcast area: Iloilo, Guimaras and surrounding areas
- Frequency: 105.9 MHz
- Branding: 105.9 Wild FM

Programming
- Languages: Hiligaynon, Filipino, English
- Format: Contemporary MOR, Dance, OPM
- Network: Wild FM

Ownership
- Owner: UM Broadcasting Network

History
- First air date: 1997 (in Bacolod)
- Former frequencies: 92.7 MHz (1997–2016)
- Call sign meaning: Willie Torres

Technical information
- Licensing authority: NTC
- Power: 10,000 watts
- ERP: 20,000 watts

Links
- Website: http://www.umbn.com.ph/wildfm

DYWT (105.9 FM), broadcasting as 105.9 Wild FM, is a radio station owned and operated by UM Broadcasting Network. The station's studio and transmitter are located at the 4th Floor, Perpetual Succor Bldg., Jalandoni St., Iloilo City.

== History ==
The station was established in 1997 as Wild 92.7 WT in Bacolod. In the early 2000s, it rebranded as Wild FM. In April 2011, it relocated to Iloilo City. In September 2016, it moved its frequency from 92.7 FM to 105.9 FM for better signal reception.

On April 8, 2017, at 12:55 am, the station's transmitter caught fire, leaving the station off the air. It was declared fire out past 2am. A few days later after the fire incident, the station resumed its broadcast.
