= DYNJ =

Radio station in Iloilo City, Philippines

RJ FM Iloilo (DYRJ)
Simulcast of DZRJ-FM Manila
- Iloilo City; Philippines
- Broadcast area: Iloilo, Guimaras and surrounding areas
- Frequency: 98.3 MHz
- Branding: 100.3 RJFM

Programming
- Language: English
- Format: Adult Hits

Ownership
- Owner: Rajah Broadcasting Network; (Free Air Broadcasting Network, Inc.)

History
- First air date: 1974
- Former call signs: DYRJ (1974–1996)
- Former frequencies: 1152 kHz (1974–1980); 98.7 MHz (1980–1996)
- Call sign meaning: Nadine Jacinto (executive producer, RJ Productions)

Technical information
- Licensing authority: NTC
- Power: 10,000 watts

DYNJ (98.3 FM) is a relay station of RJFM Manila, owned and operated by Rajah Broadcasting Network through its licensee Free Air Broadcasting Network, Inc. The station's transmitter is located along JM Basa St. corner Mapa St., Iloilo City.

== History ==
The station was established in 1974 as DYRJ on 1152 kHz. At that time, it was located in Nabitasan, La Paz District. In 1980, it transferred to FM via 98.7 MHz and was dubbed as The Flava of The City with their studio and transmitter located in Casa Plaza. In 1990, it adopted the RJFM brand and switched to an album rock format. In 1996, it transferred to 98.3 MHz and changed its name to Boss Radio. In 2000, it rebranded as The Hive and switched to a modern rock format. In 2003, it became a relay station of RJ 100 and their transmitter was transferred to Traders Royal Bldg. (TRB building) at the 4th floor at JM Basa St. corner Mapa St. . In July 2009, it transferred its transmitter facilities to Casa Plaza Bldg. In sometime in 2025, it when off-the-air due to technical and financial issues.
