= DYOZ =

Radio station in Iloilo City, Philippines

XFM Iloilo (DYOZ)
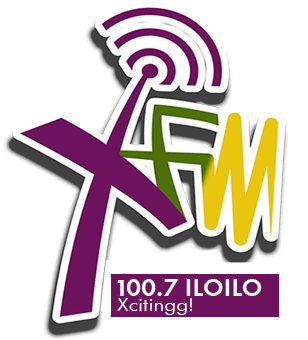
- Iloilo City; Philippines
- Broadcast area: Iloilo, Guimaras and surrounding areas
- Frequency: 100.7 MHz
- Branding: 100.7 XFM

Programming
- Languages: Hiligaynon, Filipino
- Format: Contemporary MOR, News, Talk
- Network: XFM
- Affiliations: Catholic Media Network

Ownership
- Owner: Global Broadcasting System, Inc.
- Operator: Y2H Broadcasting Network, Inc.

History
- First air date: 1979
- Former call signs: DYSA (1979–1989)
- Former names: Radio San Agustin (1979–1989); Z100 University (1993–2020)
- Call sign meaning: Z100 (former branding)

Technical information
- Licensing authority: NTC
- Class: C, D, E
- Power: 10,000 watts
- ERP: 32,000 watts

DYOZ (100.7 FM), broadcasting as 100.7 XFM, is a radio station owned by Global Broadcasting System, Inc. and operated by Y2H Broadcasting Network, Inc. The station's studio and transmitter are located at Block 3, Lot 1, Villa Las Palmas Subdivision, Brgy. Quintin Salas, Jaro, Iloilo City.

== History ==
The station was established in 1979 under the call letters DYSA-FM. It was known as Radio San Agustin with the slogans "The Pioneer FM of Iloilo" and "The Station That Makes the Difference". In 1989, it changed its call letters to DYOZ and rebranded as Z100 with the slogans "The One and Only Digital FM of Iloilo" and "Certified No.1". In 1993, it was relaunched as a college radio station as Z100 University, broadcasting from the second floor of the USA Gym Bldg. In 2006, it relocated its studio and transmitter facilities to Brgy. Mabolo-Delgado. In early 2020, it went off the air.

In early 2022, Yes2Health took over the station's operations and officially launched it on July 20 under the XFM network.
