= DYKU =

Radio station in Iloilo City, Philippines

K5 News FM Iloilo (DYKU)
- Iloilo City; Philippines
- Broadcast area: Iloilo, Guimaras and surrounding areas
- Frequency: 88.7 MHz
- Branding: 88.7 K5 News FM

Programming
- Languages: Hiligaynon, Filipino
- Format: Pop MOR, News, Talk
- Network: K5 News FM
- Affiliations: Abante; Bilyonaryo News Channel

Ownership
- Owner: FBS Radio Network
- Operator: 5K Broadcasting Network

History
- First air date: 1996
- Former names: Mellow Touch (1996–2000); Radio One (2000-January 2010); Mellow 88.7 (July 2010-2015); Radyo Bandera Sweet FM (May 2021-November 2023)

Technical information
- Licensing authority: NTC
- Power: 10,000 watts
- ERP: 20,000 watts

Links
- Website: Website

DYKU (88.7 FM), broadcasting as 88.7 K5 News FM, is a radio station owned by FBS Radio Network and operated by 5K Broadcasting Network. The station's studio and transmitter are located at Door 5, Paula Apartment, M. Jayme St, Jaro, Iloilo City.

== History ==
The station was inaugurated in 1996 as Mellow Touch 88.7 with an easy listening format, with the station located in Maria Clara Ave., Iloilo City. In 2000, it rebranded as Radio One 88.7 and switched to a Top 40 format. In January 2010, it went off the air due to transmitter problems. In July that year, it returned on air as Mellow 887 with an Adult Top 40 format. It went off the air sometime in 2016.

On late May 2021, it returned on air, this time under the Radyo Bandera Sweet FM network of 5K Broadcasting Network. On December 1, 2023, all Radyo Bandera Sweet FM stations rebranded as K5 News FM.

Currently, K5 News FM Iloilo serves as the originating station for the network's radio drama department, syndicating its flagship series Rehas for K5's Western Visayas chain.
