= DYQN =

Radio station in Iloilo City, Philippines

Home Radio Iloilo (DYQN)
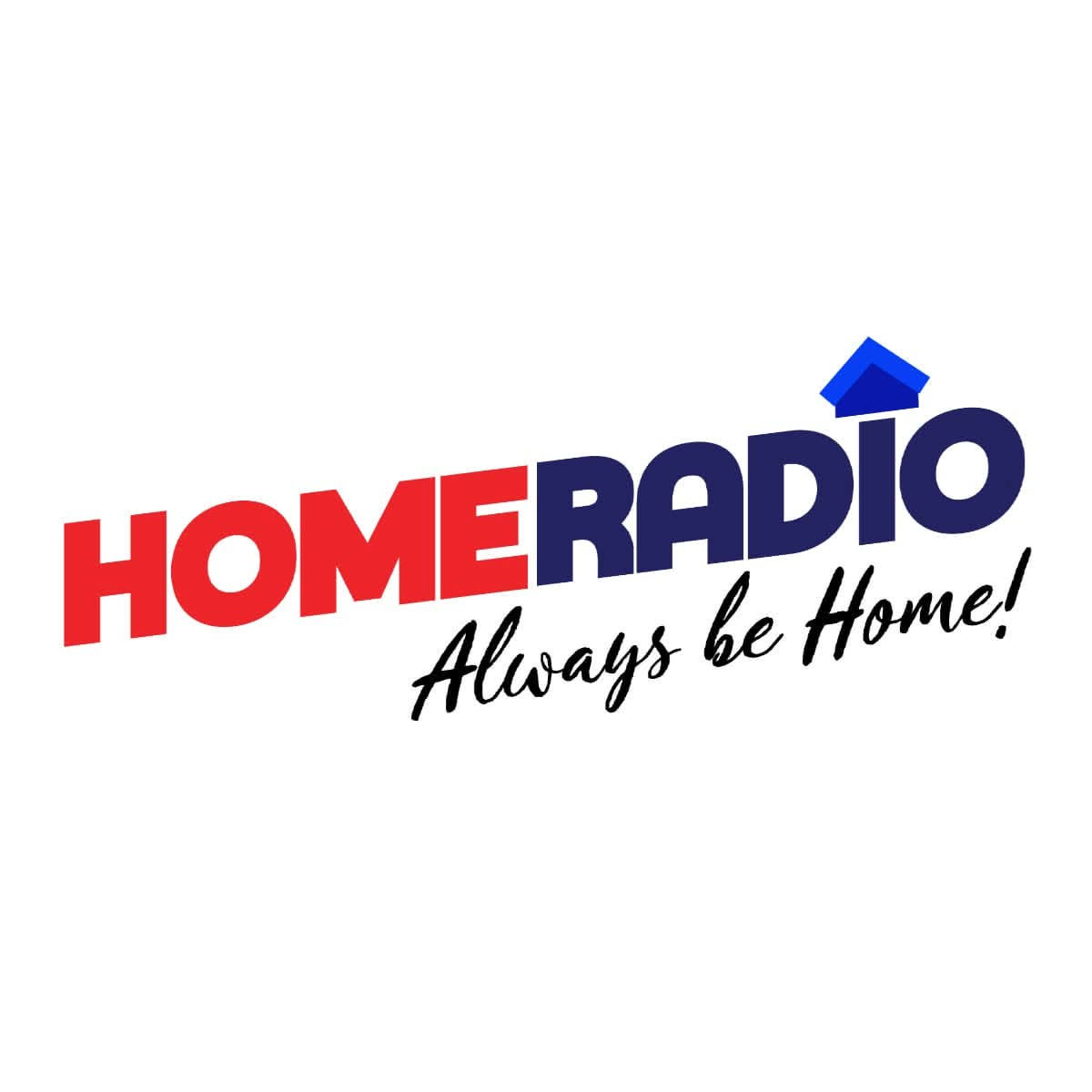
- Iloilo City; Philippines
- Broadcast area: Iloilo, Guimaras and surrounding areas
- Frequency: 89.5 MHz
- Branding: 89.5 Home Radio

Programming
- Language: English
- Format: Soft adult contemporary
- Network: Home Radio

Ownership
- Owner: Aliw Broadcasting Corporation

History
- First air date: February 1994
- Former names: Q89 (1994–99); DWIZ (2023–26)

Technical information
- Licensing authority: NTC
- Power: 10,000 watts
- ERP: 30,000 watts

DYQN (89.5 FM), broadcasting as 89.5 Home Radio, is a radio station owned and operated by Aliw Broadcasting Corporation. Its studio and transmitter are located along 3/F Eternal Plans Bldg., J.M. Basa cor. Ortiz St., Iloilo City.

== History ==
The station was established in February 1994 as Q89. Being the first FM station opened by Aliw Broadcasting Corporation, it carried a Top 40 format. In 1999, the station rebranded as Home Radio Q89 and switched to an easy listening format. The Q89 brand was dropped the following year.

On March 17, 2014, Home Radio, along with the other provincial stations, reformatted into a mass-based format, with "Natural!" as its slogan.

On April 5, 2015, the station switched back to its Top 40 format mixed with OPM, simply known as CHR Local. On late 2015, the station adopted the slogan "The Music of Now" and shifted to a fully-fledged Top 40 format.

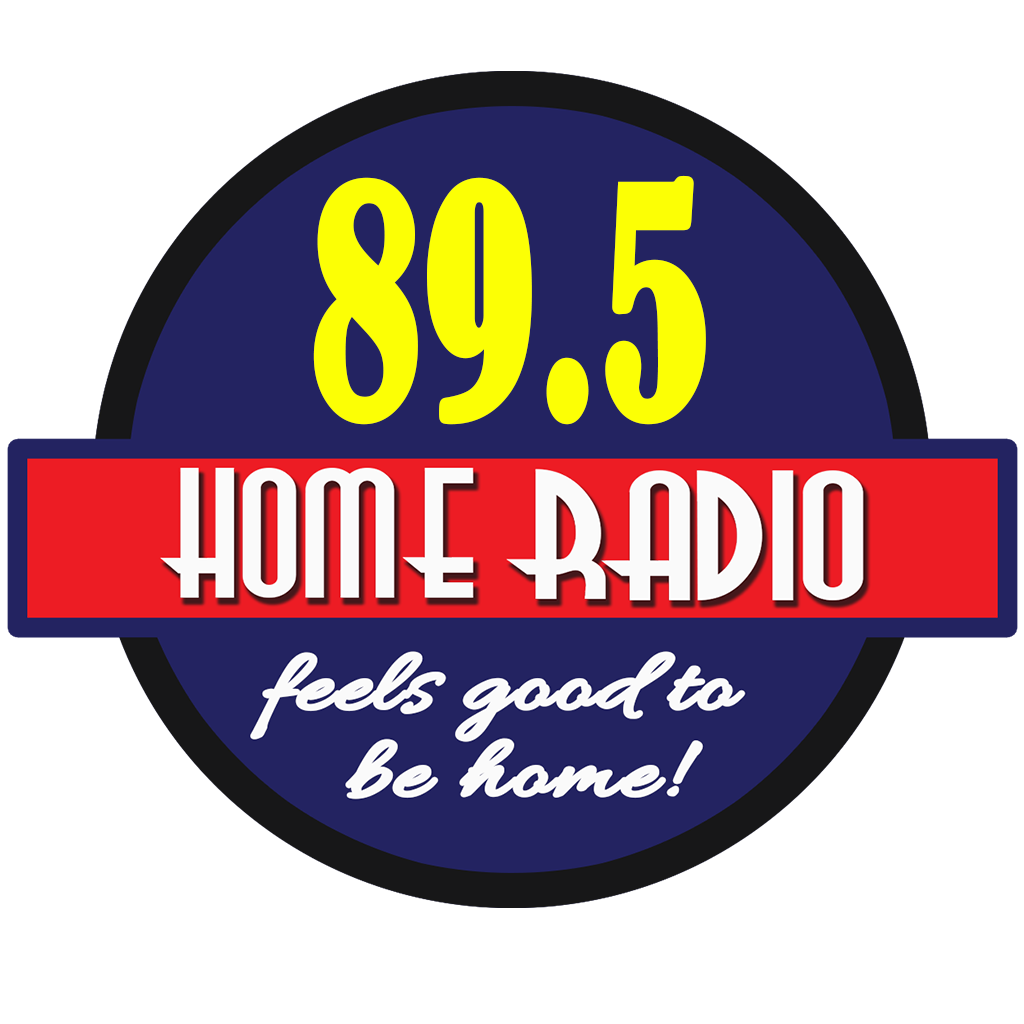
Logo from July 2017 to January 2023.

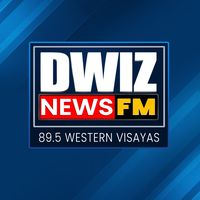
Logo from January 2023 to April 2026.

In July 2017, Home Radio flipped back to its easy listening format. In 2018, Home Radio's provincial stations started simulcasting DWIZ's program Karambola, thus allowing the station to include news and commentaries in the morning to the station's format. In 2021, the simulcast expanded to include the entire morning block of DWIZ.

On January 16, 2023, the station dropped the Home Radio branding. On January 30, 2023, it was relaunched under the DWIZ network with a news and talk format. On April 30, 2026, DWIZ News FM made its final broadcast.

On May 8, 2026, after a week of music automation, the station brought back the Home Radio brand and its original format.
