= DYSI =

Radio station in Iloilo City, Philippines

Super Radyo Iloilo (DYSI)
- Iloilo City; Philippines
- Broadcast area: Iloilo, Guimaras and surrounding areas
- Frequency: 1323 kHz
- Branding: GMA Super Radyo DYSI 1323

Programming
- Languages: Hiligaynon, Filipino
- Format: News, Public Affairs, Talk
- Network: Super Radyo

Ownership
- Owner: GMA Network Inc.
- Sister stations: Barangay LS 93.5; GMA TV-6 Iloilo; GTV 28 Iloilo

History
- First air date: September 1, 1985
- Former call signs: DYXX-AM (1985–1997)
- Former frequencies: 873 kHz (2006–2007)
- Call sign meaning: September 1, 1985

Technical information
- Licensing authority: NTC
- Class: B
- Power: 10,000 watts
- ERP: 20,000 watts
- Repeaters: Bacolod: DYSB 1179 kHz; Roxas: DYBB 1503 kHz

Links
- Webcast: Super Radyo Iloilo 1323
- Website: GMANetwork.com

DYSI (1323 AM) Super Radyo is a radio station owned and operated by GMA Network Inc. The station's studio is located inside the GMA Compound, Phase 5, Alta Tierra Village, Brgy. Quntin Salas, Jaro, Iloilo City, and its transmitter is located at Brgy. Navais, Mandurriao, Iloilo City.

== History ==
The station first went on air on September 1, 1985 under the call letters DYXX (Double X), inspired by DZXX/DWXX in Manila. On April 13, 1997, it changed to its current callsign. In 2020, it transferred its transmitter facilities from Brgy. Jibao-an, Pavia to Brgy. Navais, Mandurriao. In April 2025, DYSI began simulcasting Barangay LS 93.5's program "Talk to Papa Na, Talk to Mama Pa".
