= DYMB-FM =

Radio station in Iloilo City, Philippines

Love Radio Iloilo (DYMB)
- Iloilo City; Philippines
- Broadcast area: Iloilo, Guimaras and surrounding areas
- Frequency: 97.5 MHz
- Branding: 97.5 Love Radio

Programming
- Languages: Hiligaynon, Filipino
- Format: Contemporary MOR, OPM
- Network: Love Radio

Ownership
- Owner: MBC Media Group; (Philippine Broadcasting Corporation)
- Operator: RVV Broadcast Ventures
- Sister stations: DYOK Aksyon Radyo, DZRH Iloilo, 92.3 Easy Rock

History
- First air date: January 8, 1979
- Call sign meaning: Manila Broadcasting

Technical information
- Licensing authority: NTC
- Class: C, D, E
- Power: 10,000 watts
- ERP: 20,000 watts

Links
- Webcast: Listen Live
- Website: Love Radio Iloilo

DYMB (97.5 FM), broadcasting as 97.5 Love Radio, is a radio station owned by MBC Media Group through its licensee Philippine Broadcasting Corporation and operated by RVV Broadcast Ventures. Its studio and transmitter are located at the 5th floor, Kahirup Bldg., Guanco St., Iloilo City.
