= List of radio stations in Northern Mindanao =

Here is the list of radio stations in the Northern Mindanao region:

== Bukidnon ==
=== AM Stations ===
Frequency	Name	Company	Format	Callsign	Power	Location
594 kHz	Radyo Bandilyo Malaybalay	Catholic Bishops Conference of the Philippines (operated by Diocese of Malaybalay)	News, Public Affairs, Talk, Religious	DXDB	5 kW	Malaybalay
648 kHz	RMN Malaybalay	Radio Mindanao Network, Inc.	News, Public Affairs Talk, Drama	DXMB	3 kW	Malaybalay
864 kHz	Bombo Radyo Malaybalay	People's Broadcasting Service, Inc. (operated by Bombo Radyo Philippines)	News, Public Affairs, Talk, Drama	DXCB	5 kW	Malaybalay
1134 kHz	Radyo ni Ga Valencia	University of Mindanao Broadcasting	News, Public Affairs, Talk	DXMV	5 kW	Valencia
1386 kHz	Hope Radio Valencia	Mt. View College (affiliated by Hope Channel Philippines)	Religious radio (Seventh-day Adventist Church)	DXCR	10 kW	Valencia

=== FM Stations ===
Frequency	Name	Company	Format	Callsign	Power	Location
87.7 MHz	Radyo Bandera Malaybalay Repeater	Bandera News Philippines (operated by Fairwaves Broadcasting Network)	Contemporary MOR, News, Talk	DXNL-Repeater	3 kW	Malaybalay
88.1 MHz	Juander Radyo Malaybalay	Malindang Broadcasting Network Corporation (operated by RSV Broadcasting Network)	Contemporary MOR, News, Talk	DXFP	5 kW	Malaybalay
88.9 MHz	Development Radio	Central Mindanao University	College radio	DXMU	5 kW	Maramag
89.5 MHz	Magnet FM Maramag	Skia Broadcasting Center	Contemporary MOR, News, Talk	DXVR	5 kW	Maramag
89.7 MHz	Radyo Bandera Malaybalay	Bandera News Philippines (operated by Fairwaves Broadcasting Network)	Contemporary MOR, News, Talk	DXNL	5 kW	Malaybalay
90.1 MHz	Ayos Radio	Kalayaan Broadcasting System	Community Radio	DXAP	1 kW	Don Carlos
90.1 MHz	Sunrise News FM	—N/a	Community Radio	DXMJ	1 kW	Sumilao
90.7 MHz	Yellow Line FM	—N/a	Community Radio	DXMC	1 kW	Pangantucan
90.9 MHz	K5 News FM Don Carlos	Subic Broadcasting Corperation, Operated by 5K Broadcasting Network	News, Talk	—N/a	3 kW	Don Carlos
91.3 MHz	Infinite Radio Valencia	St. Jude Thaddeus Institute of Technology (operated by Nonlading Broadcasting Services)	Contemporary MOR, OPM	DXVC	5 kW	Valencia
91.7 MHz	LCM FM	Adventist Media	Religious radio (Seventh-day Adventist Church)	—N/a	5 kW	Malaybalay
91.7 MHz	R Radio FM	—N/a	Community Radio	—N/a	1 kW	Kalilangan
92.1 MHz	Radyo Abante	Iddes Broadcast Group	Contemporary MOR, News, Talk	DXGT	5 kW	Maramag
92.9 MHz	Wild FM Bukidnon	University of Mindanao Broadcasting Network, Inc.	Contemporary MOR, Dance, OPM	DXWB	5 kW	Valencia
93.7 MHz	Heart FM Bukidnon (Note: Relay station of DXOC 92.7 Heart FM Cagayan de Oro.)	Highland Broadcasting Network Corporation	Soft AC, OPM	DXIZ	5 kW	Maramag
94.3 MHz	Lite FM Kibawe	Nonglading Broadcasting Services	Contemporary MOR, OPM, News, Talk	DXWO	5 kW	Kibawe
94.5 MHz	Prime FM Valencia	Prime Broadcasting Network	Contemporary MOR, OPM	—N/a	2 kW	Valencia
94.9 MHz	RVFM	—N/a	Contemporary MOR, OPM, News, Talk	—N/a	5 kW	Pangantucan
95.3 MHz	iFM Valencia	Radio Mindanao Network, Inc.	Contemporary MOR, OPM, News, Talk	DXAR	5 kW	Valencia
95.9 MHz	Radyo Deturbo	—N/a	Community radio	—N/a	1 kW	Kibawe
96.1 MHz	Energy FM Valencia	Ultrasonic Broadcasting System, Inc.	Contemporary MOR, OPM	DXJX	5 kW	Valencia
96.5 MHz	Biglight Radio	—N/a	Community Radio	—N/a	1 kW	Kibawe
96.9 MHz	Hope Radio Valencia	Mt. View College (affiliated by Hope Channel Philippines)	Religious radio (Seventh-day Adventist Church)	DXCR	5 kW	Valencia
97.1 MHz	Yams FM Radyo Ambungan	—N/a	Contemporary MOR, Music, News	—N/a	1 kW	Valencia
97.3 MHz	Bless FM	—N/a	Community radio	—N/a	1 kW	Pangantucan
97.7 MHz	Radyo Sincero Valencia	Sarraga Intg. and Mgmt. Corp. (operated by ABJ Broadcasting Services)	Contemporary MOR, OPM	DXSR	1 kW	Valencia
98.5 MHz	Gold FM Valencia	Kalayaan Broadcasting System, Inc. (operated by Kaibigan Brotherhood Association)	Contemporary MOR, News, Talk	DXLG	5 kW	Valencia
98.9 MHz	Stallion Radio (relay from Pangantucan)	Stallion Broadcasting Services	Community radio	—N/a	5 kW	Maramag
99.3 MHz	RCFM	Kaissar Broadcasting Network	Contemporary MOR, OPM, Talk	—N/a	5 kW	Valencia
100.1 MHz	Radyo Commando	—N/a	Adult Top 40, News, Talk	DXRC	5 kW	Valencia
100.9 MHz	Radyo Natin Manolo Fortich	Manila Broadcasting Company	Community radio	DXRA	1 kW	Manolo Fortich
101.3 MHz	Super Bagting	Capitol Broadcasting Center (operated by Pacific Press Media Production Corporation)	Contemporary MOR, News, Talk	DXHL	5 kW	Maramag
101.7 MHz	XFM Bukidnon	DXRA-RMC Broadcasting Corporation (operated by Y2H Broadcasting Network)	Contemporary MOR, News, Talk	DXQE	5 kW	Malaybalay
102.1 MHz	Stallion Radio	Stallion Broadcasting Services	Community radio	DXLZ	1 kW	Pangantucan
102.5 MHz	Radyo Bandera Valencia	Bandera News Philippines (operated by Fairwaves Broadcasting Network)	Contemporary MOR, Talk	DXFF	5 kW	Valencia
102.7 MHz	Radyo Trabungko	—N/a	Community Radio	—N/a	1 kW	Don Carlos
103.1 MHz	ABS FM Radio Maramag	Prime Broadcasting Network, Inc.	Contemporary MOR, OPM	DXMF	5 kW	Maramag
103.3 MHz	Radyo Lampornas Valencia	FBS Radio Network	Soft AC, News, Talk	DXOC	5 kW	Valencia
103.9 MHz	Angle Radio	Rizal Memorial Colleges Broadcasting Corporation	Contemporary MOR, News, Talk	DXDC	5 kW	Don Carlos
104.1 MHz	Yes FM Valencia	Cebu Broadcasting Company	Contemporary MOR, OPM	DXAT	5 kW	Valencia
104.5 MHz	DXBU 104.5	Bukidnon State University	College radio	DXBU	5 kW	Malaybalay
104.7 MHz	Prime FM Maramag	Prime Broadcasting Network	Music, News	—N/a	1 kW	Maramag
104.9 MHz	Radyo Kalilang	National Nutrition Council (operated by Nutriskwela Community Radio)	Community radio	DXNN	1 kW	Kalilangan
105.3 MHz	Bukidnon Vibe Radio	MIT Radio TV Network	Contemporary MOR, News, Talk	DXWS	5 kW	Malaybalay
105.7 MHz	Brigada News FM Valencia	Baycomms Broadcasting Corporation (operated by Brigada Mass Media Corporation)	Contemporary MOR, News, Talk	DXBX	10 kW	Valencia
106.3 MHz	Love Radio Malaybalay	Manila Broadcasting Company	Contemporary MOR, OPM	DXIQ	5 kW	Malaybalay
106.9 MHz	Radyo Natin Maramag	Manila Broadcasting Company (operated by Gaudes Advertising Agency)	Community radio	DXRO	0.5 kW	Maramag
107.1 MHz	Happy FM 107.1	Iddes Broadcast Group, Inc.	Contemporary MOR, News, Talk	DXGG	5 kW	Malaybalay
107.5 MHz	Radyo Sincero Impasugong (Note: Relay station of DXSR 97.7 Radyo Sincero Valencia.)	ABJ Broadcasting Services	Contemporary MOR, OPM	—N/a	2.5 kW	Impasugong
107.7 MHz	Radyo Kilat	Subic Broadcasting Corporation (operated by Kilat RadioKast)	Contemporary MOR, News, Talk	DXQB	5 kW	Quezon

== Camiguin ==
=== FM Stations ===
Frequency	Name	Company	Format	Callsign	Power	Location
98.3 MHz	FMR Camiguin	Philippine Collective Media Corporation	Contemporary MOR, News, Talk	PA	2 kW	Mambajao

== Lanao del Norte ==
=== AM Stations ===
==== Iligan ====
Frequency	Name	Company	Format	Callsign	Power
711 kHz	RMN Iligan	Radio Mindanao 'Network, Inc.	drama, news, public affairs, talk	DXIC	10 kW

=== FM Stations ===
==== Iligan ====
Frequency	Name	Company	Format	Callsign	Power
88.7 MHz	RJFM Iligan (Note: Relay station of DZRJ 100.3 RJFM Manila.)	Rajah Broadcasting Network	adult hits	DXQJ	5 kW
90.1 MHz	Juander Radyo Iligan	Malindang Broadcasting Network Corporation (operated by RSV Broadcasting Network)	contemporary MOR, news, talk	DXND	5 kW
91.5 MHz	Freedom Radio	—N/a	community radio	DXLH	1 kW
92.1 MHz	Heart FM Iligan	—N/a	Contemporary MOR, News, Talk	DXRL	5 kW
92.9 MHz	Edge FM Iligan	RMC Broadcasting Corporation	Contemporary MOR, News, Talk	DXDZ	5 kW
93.7 MHz	MC Radio	—N/a	contemporary MOR, news, talk	—N/a	5 kW
95.1 MHz	Brigada News FM Iligan	Baycomms Broadcasting Corporation (operated by Brigada Mass Media Corporation)	contemporary MOR, news, talk	DXZD	5 kW
96.7 MHz	FMR Iligan	Philippine Collective Media Corporation	contemporary MOR, news, talk	—N/a	5 kW
99.3 MHz	Yes FM Iligan	Pacific Broadcasting System, Inc.	contemporary MOR, OPM	DXFE	5 kW
100.9 MHz	Radyo Bandera Iligan	Bandera News Philippines	contemporary MOR, news, talk	DXJB	5 kW
102.3 MHz	iFM Iligan	Radio Mindanao Network, Inc.	contemporary MOR, news, talk	DXIX	5 kW
103.1 MHz	Wild FM Iligan	University of Mindanao Broadcasting Network, Inc.	contemporary MOR, OPM	DXIL	5 kW
104.1 MHz	Nonglading Radio Iligan	Kalayaan Broadcasting System, Inc. (operated by Nonglading Broadcasting Service)	contemporary MOR, news, talk	DXIV	5 kW
105.5 MHz	Radyo Pilipinas Iligan	Philippine Broadcasting Service	government radio, news, public affairs, talk	DXDX	5 kW
106.7 MHz	Scripture Radio	—N/a	Religious, Talk	DXSR	1 kW
107.5 MHz	CFM 107.5	—N/a	Contemporary MOR, News, Talk	—N/a	5 kW

==== Lanao del Norte ====
Frequency	Name	Company	Format	Callsign	Power	Location
94.3 MHz	Radyo Kalambuan	National Nutrition Council (affiliated by Nutriskwela Community Radio and Provincial Government of Lanao del Norte)	community radio	DXNE	0.5 kW	Tubod
97.1 MHz	Spring FM	Amigoz Advertising Services	Contemporary MOR, News, Talk	—N/a	1 kW	Tubod
101.3 MHz	Grace Covenant FM	Iddes Broadcast Group, Inc.	Contemporary MOR, News, Talk	DXGC	1 kW	Bacolod
107.7 MHz	Lite FM	PEC Broadcasting Corporation	Contemporary MOR, News, Talk	DXVL	1 kW	Lala

== Misamis Occidental ==
=== AM Stations ===
Frequency	Name	Company	Format	Callsign	Power	Location
657 kHz	Radyo Kampana Ozamiz	Catholic Bishops Conference of the Philippines (operated by Archdiocese of Ozamis)	News, Public Affairs Talk, Religious radio	DXDD	5 kW	Ozamiz
1494 kHz	Radyo Pilipino Ozamiz	Radio Audience Integrated Development (operated by Radyo Pilipino Corporation)	News, Talk	DXOC	2 kW	Ozamiz

=== FM Stations ===
Frequency	Name	Company	Format	Callsign	Power	Location
88.3 MHz	Unbox Radio Ozamiz	—N/a	Adult Top 40, OPM	—N/a	5 kW	Ozamiz
89.7 MHz	GS FM	GS Media Broadcasting Network	Contemporary MOR, News, Talk	—N/a	5 kW	Tudela
90.7 MHz	Bay Radio Ozamiz	—N/a	Contemporary MOR, News, Talk	DXHP	5 kW	Ozamiz
91.3 MHz	Radyo Positibo Oroquieta	Malindang Broadcasting Network Corporation (operated by MIT Radio TV Network)	Contemporary MOR, OPM	DXOB	5 kW	Oroquieta
92.5 MHz	Proud FM Aloran	—N/a	Contemporary MOR, OPM	—N/a	5 kW	Aloran
93.1 MHz	Heart FM Oroquieta	Highland Broadcasting Network	Soft AC, OPM, News	—N/a	1 kW	Oroquieta
93.3 MHz	N93 FM	Misamis Inst. Of Technology (operated by MIT Radio TV Network)	Contemporary MOR, OPM	DXTM	5 kW	Jimenez
94.3 MHz	Partner Radio FM	Amapola Broadcasting System	Contemporary MOR, OPM, News, Talk	—N/a	5 kW	Oroquieta
94.7 MHz	Gold FM Calamba	Kalayaan Broadcasting System	Contemporary MOR, OPM, News, Talk	—N/a	5 kW	Calamba
95.3 MHz	Brigada News FM Oroquieta	Baycomms Broadcasting Corporation (operated by Brigada Mass Media Corporation)	Contemporary MOR, News, Talk	DXBK	5 kW	Oroquieta
96.1 MHz	Radyo Sincero Ozamiz	Times Broadcasting Network Corporation (operated by Bisdak Media Group)	Contemporary MOR, OPM, News, Talk	DXSY	5 kW	Ozamiz
96.5 MHz	DXNT	Kaissar Broadcasting Network	Contemporary MOR, OPM, News, Talk	DXNT	5 kW	Oroquieta
97.7 MHz	Gold FM Oroquieta	Kalayaan Broadcasting System	Contemporary MOR, OPM, News, Talk	—N/a	5 kW	Oroquieta
100.7 MHz	Cool Radio	Catholic Bishops Conference of the Philippines (operated by Archdiocese of Ozamis)	CHR Top 40, OPM, Pop, Talk	DXDD	5 kW	Ozamiz
106.1 MHz	Radyo Natin Oroquieta	Manila Broadcasting Company	Community radio	DXRQ	2 kW	Oroquieta
106.5 MHz	Radyo Pilipinas Tangub	Philippine Broadcast Service (operated by City Government of Tangub)	News, Public Affairs, Talk, Government Radio	DXCT	5 kW	Tangub
106.7 MHz	Farm Radio	—N/a	Community Radio	—N/a	1 kW	Clarin
