= Canoy =

Canoy is a Filipino surname. Notable people with the surname include:

- Henry Canoy (1923–2008), Filipino businessman, founder of Radio Mindanao Network
- Jeff Canoy (born 1984), Filipino journalist and documentary filmmaker
- Joey Canoy (born 1993), Filipino boxer
- Reuben Canoy (1929–2022), Filipino lawyer, writer, film producer and politician
