= DXVM =

DXVM may refer to the following stations in Cagayan de Oro:

- DXVM-FM, an FM station branded as iFM
- DXVM-TV, a TV station
