= DXCC (disambiguation) =

DXCC stands for DX Century Club, one of the Amateur radio operating awards.

DXCC may also refer to the callsign of two stations in Cagayan de Oro, Philippines:

- DXCC-AM, an AM radio station branded as RMN Cagayan de Oro
- DXCC-TV, a TV station branded as IBC Cagayan de Oro
