= DXDR =

DXDR may refer to:

- DXDR-AM, an AM radio station broadcasting in Dipolog, branded as RMN
- DXDR-FM, an FM radio station broadcasting in Davao City, branded as Energy FM
