= DXMB =

DXMB may refer to the following Philippine radio stations:

- DXMB-AM, an AM radio station broadcasting in Malaybalay, branded as DXMB 648 RMN Malaybalay
- DXMB-FM, an FM radio station broadcasting in Butuan, branded as Love Radio
