= DXKR =

DXKR may refer to:

- DXKR-AM, an AM radio station broadcasting in Koronadal, branded as RMN Koronadal
- DXKR-FM, an FM radio station broadcasting in Davao, branded as Retro 95.5
