= DXVM-TV =

- Metro Cagayan de Oro; Philippines
- Channels: Analog: 33 (inactive)

Ownership
- Owner: Broadcast Enterprises and Affiliated Media, Inc.

History
- First air date: August 17, 1992 (RMN TV); July 3, 2011 (BEAM TV)
- Former channel numbers: Analog: (8 VHF, 1995–2003, 2011-2017 & 33 UHF, 1992-2003, 2011–2016)
- Former affiliations: CTV 31 (August 1993-April 2000); E! Entertainment (April 2000-May 2003); Silent (2003-2011); The Game Channel (August 2011-February 2012); CHASE (December 2011-October 2012); Jack City (October 2012-September 2014); Independent (September 2014-May 2023)
- Call sign meaning: "Voice of Music"

Technical information
- Licensing authority: NTC
- Power: 5 kW

Links
- Website: www.beam.com.ph

DXVM-TV was a television station in Cagayan de Oro, Philippines. analog channel of Broadcast Enterprises and Affiliated Media, Inc.. Its transmitter located at VIP Hotel, Don Apolinar Velez St., Cagayan de Oro. This was also the former relay station of RMN in Cagayan de Oro from 1995 to 2003 in returned from 2011 to 2016.

== History ==
RMN-TV Channel 8 was the first TV station of Radio Mindanao Network. It was launched on August 28, 1991, thirty-nine years after it start, RMN was now venturing into television. And also RMN finally granted a permit to broadcast on UHF 31 in Metro Manila. This station was planned on the same year but it was launched in 1992 together with BEAM Channel 31 in Metro Manila. It was started as Cinema Television (or CTV-31) in 1992. It was also the first UHF station to be inspired by a movie television. And on year 1997, it had its broadcast rights form E!, an American-cable network channel that features fashion and lifestyle show, which is lately known as E! Philippines. But in the year 2003 RMN decided to cancel its operation to TV network, citing financial constraints and poor ratings.

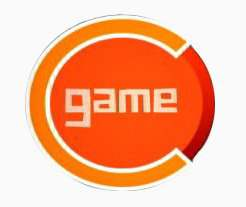
Logo of The Game Channel from August 15, 2011-February 15, 2012

After almost eight years of inactivity in Cagayan de Oro television, on July 3, 2011, UHF 33 returned its operations as a test broadcast. The station (along with some RMN-owned UHF stations nationwide) was occupied by Broadcast Enterprises and Affiliated Media, after the latter bought up the acquisition by Bethlehem Holdings, Inc. (funded by Globe Telecom's Group Retirement Fund) from RMN. And as the first broadcast TV operations under new ownership, BEAM began its affiliation partnership with Solar Entertainment Corporation (through Nine Media Corporation).

The network was branded on July 13 as BEAM Channel 33. On August 15, 2011, it started its initial broadcast carrying The Game Channel. However, on December 24, The Game Channel limited its broadcast every morning and afternoon, to give way to its new sister network station CHASE, which is used its evening block.

On December 24, 2011, The Game Channel limited its broadcast on daytime sharing with a new programming service called CHASE which takes over the evening block. In February 2012, both services aired a promotion, announcing the split of CHASE and TGC to form themselves as separate channels, which entitled "CHASE goes 24". The changes took effect on February 15, 2012, when The Game Channel bade goodbye to the viewers after its 7-month run on free TV and became a cable-only channel; while CHASE leased and took its entire BEAM airtime on free TV.

On September 7, 2012, Jack TV plugged their announcement thru CHASE programs bearing the title "Another Jack TV is rising, coming soon on this channel" (BEAM Channel 33). This indicated that CHASE was being replaced; finally, on October 20, 2012, Jack City was then launched, marking October 19 as the end of CHASE's broadcasts. Jack City still does carry some of CHASE's programs however. The full broadcast was initiated on November 11, 2012. On June 28, 2013, Jack City was forced to reduce its Free TV broadcast to 18 hours a day on BEAM in compliance with the National Telecommunications Commission's guidelines. However, it still continues to air as a cable channel 24 hours a day.

On September 1, 2014, Jack City was no longer aired and affiliated on BEAM Channel 33 and its provincial affiliates, as BEAM prepares its ISDB-T digital television. However, Jack City continues to broadcast on pay TV networks until March 21, 2015, when the channel was rebranded as CT a day later on March 22, 2015.

At the same day, it began using blocktime programs from O Shopping (of ABS-CBN Corporation and CJ Group of Korea) and several programs from TBN Asia (including The 700 Club Asia and Praise the Lord) along with religious programming produced by the Essential Broadcasting Network under the leadership of Bro. Greg Durante of Greg Durante Ministries.

On November 15, 2014, the channel is carried over SkyCable, Destiny Cable and other Pay TV subscribers (per compliance with NTC's "must-carry" basis), displacing Jack City to a different cable channel assignment, which is only available for subscribers residing in Metro Manila and neighboring provinces. This also makes BEAM available to cable viewers 24 hours a day once again when it took effect four months later, on March 12, 2015.

On March 1, 2015, TV Shop Philippines (also known as revival of Value Vision) began airing on this channel in the afternoon, followed by selected Tagalog-dubbed telenovelas carried from the Telenovela Channel on nighttime.

On March 9, 2015, the channel also added Shop Japan to its programming during morning hours, and recently they added Shop TV as their newest shopping network partner on February 22, 2016 (ironically Shop TV is owned by BEAM's former blocktime partner Solar Entertainment).

By March 1, 2016, all of BEAM's programs were split into digital television streams. O Shopping, TBN, TV Shop and Shop Japan were relocated as their respective digital subchannel of its own; while BEAM became an affiliate of Shop TV in its analog signal, allowing it to cover most of BEAM's airtime (Tagalog-dubbed telenovelas remained on the analog channel during primetime).

In May 2016, BEAM added the live video streaming service of Philippine Daily Inquirer and Trans-Radio Broadcasting Corporation's Radyo Inquirer 990 as its new subchannel affiliate, coinciding with the 2016 Philippine elections. Within the same month, Bacolod City-based travel and lifestyle cable channel Island Living (broadcasting its programs through provincial cable operators including some affiliates of SkyCable from Visayas and Mindanao) became BEAM's new subchannel, followed by the replacement of TBN Asia with Taiwan-based Christian pay TV channel GOOD TV (which is in fact aired as a former blocktime program from Light Network-33 and as a standalone channel on Destiny Cable and Cignal). GOOD TV PH, however, was replaced by infomercial service EZShop weeks later. Its channel space on digital television remains vacant since July 2016, with GCTV returned a few months later.

The channel split of BEAM was finally completed in August 2016 when telenovelas were removed from the network's main/analog feed.
