= DWHB-FM =

Radio station in Baguio, Philippines

iFM Baguio (DWHB)
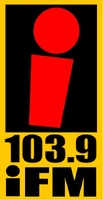
- Baguio; Philippines
- Broadcast area: Benguet, La Union and surrounding areas
- Branding: 103.9 iFM

Programming
- Languages: Ilocano, Filipino
- Format: Contemporary MOR, OPM, News
- Network: iFM

Ownership
- Owner: Radio Mindanao Network

History
- First air date: February 4, 1980
- Former names: Smooth Jazz HB 103 (1980–1992); Smile Radio (1992–1999); HBFM (1999–2002)
- Call sign meaning: Herald of Baguio

Technical information
- Licensing authority: NTC
- Class: CDE
- Power: 10,000 watts
- ERP: 40,000 watts

Links
- Webcast: Listen Live
- Website: iFM Baguio

DWHB (103.9 FM), broadcasting as 103.9 iFM, is a radio station owned and operated by the Radio Mindanao Network. The station's studio is located at Room 203, Laperal Bldg., Upper Session Rd., Baguio, and its transmitter is located at Diplomat Rd., Dominican Hill, Baguio.

== History ==
Established on February 4, 1980, DWHB was one of the pioneer FM station in Baguio, along with DZWR and DZYB; hence the station began operations as Smooth Jazz HB103, one of the few RMN FM stations at that time, airing a smooth jazz format together with DYXL in Cebu (which they carrying easy listening format). It was the first FM station in the city to carry such format. On August 16, 1992, HB103 was only lasted for almost a decade, when all RMN provincial stations started carrying the Smile Radio branding and switched to a mass-based format. On November 23, 1999, it was rebranded as 1039 HBFM (pronounced as "one-o-three-nine") and switched into a CHR/Top 40 format, with the slogan "Live It Up!". On May 16, 2002, DWHB was amongst the stations relaunched under RMN's iFM network and returned to its original mass-based format. In 2018, iFM started carrying the slogan "Ang Idol Kong FM", coinciding with the nationwide launch of its new jingle.
