= DXDR-AM =

Radio station in Zamboanga del Norte, Philippines

RMN Dipolog (DXDR)
- Dipolog; Philippines
- Broadcast area: Eastern Zamboanga del Norte and surrounding areas
- Frequency: 981 kHz
- Branding: DXDR RMN Dipolog

Programming
- Languages: Cebuano, Filipino
- Format: News, Public Affairs, Talk
- Network: Radyo Mo Nationwide
- Affiliations: DYHP 612 (selected programs)

Ownership
- Owner: Radio Mindanao Network

History
- First air date: 1981
- Call sign meaning: Dipolog Radio

Technical information
- Licensing authority: NTC
- Power: 5,000 watts
- Repeater: DXZZ 94.1 MHz

Links
- Website: https://rmn.ph/dxdr981dipolog/ https://rmndipolog.weebly.com/

DXDR (981 AM) RMN Dipolog is a radio station owned and operated by the Radio Mindanao Network. Its studio and transmitter are located at RMN Broadcast Center, National Highway, Brgy. Turno, Dipolog. The station also airs a handful of programs from RMN Cebu.

== History ==
In 1981, as part of its massive expansion program initiated in 1978, Radio Mindanao Network commenced its AM broadcasting operations in Dipolog under the call sign DXDR. This move was the second RMN AM station opened in Zamboanga Peninsula after DXRZ of Zamboanga City in 1961, and the second AM station to operate in the city after RPN DXKD Radyo Ronda. Its launching was done the same year as DXPR RMN Pagadian.
