= DYXL =

DYXL may refer to the following stations in Visayas, Philippines:

- DYXL-FM (93.9 FM), an FM radio station in Cebu City, broadcasting as iFM
- DYXL-TV (channel 4), a defunct television station in Bacolod, broadcasting as ABS-CBN Bacolod
