= DYXY =

Radio station in Tacloban, Philippines

iFM RMN Tacloban (DYXY)
- Tacloban; Philippines
- Broadcast area: Northern Leyte, southern Samar
- Frequency: 99.1 MHz
- Branding: 99.1 iFM RMN

Programming
- Languages: Waray, Filipino
- Format: Contemporary MOR, News, Talk
- Network: iFM; Radyo Mo Nationwide

Ownership
- Owner: Radio Mindanao Network

History
- First air date: 1978
- Former names: DYXY (1978–1992); Smile Radio (1992–99); XYFM (1999–2002); iFM (2002–17)
- Former frequencies: 93.9 MHz (1978–1980)

Technical information
- Licensing authority: NTC
- Class: CDE
- Power: 10,000 watts
- ERP: 27,000 watts

Links
- Website: RMN Tacloban

DYXY (99.1 FM), broadcasting as 99.1 iFM RMN, is a radio station owned and operated by the Radio Mindanao Network. The station's studio and transmitter are located at #181 Goldtrade Bldg., P. Burgos St., Tacloban. The station operates daily 24/7.

== History ==
DYXY was launched in 1978 on 93.9 MHz. It carried a Top 40 format. In 1980, it moved to 99.1 MHz.

On August 16, 1992, DYXY rebranded as Smile Radio and switched to a mass-based format. On November 23, 1999, the station rebranded as 991 XYFM and returned to Top 40.

On May 16, 2002, the station was relaunched as 99.1 iFM and returned to a mass-based format. It also adopted the slogan, Hit after Hit.

On March 2, 2009, as part of RMN's nationwide expansion, iFM changed its new logo and the slogan Sa iFM, Siguradong Enjoy Ka!.

On November 9, 2015, iFM launched its new logo and slogan "Ang Bestfriend Mo!".

In January 2017, the station added news and talk to its programming under the RMN branding, similar to Naga-based DWNX. However, iFM's bumpers are only used for its music blocks.
