= DWSR-FM =

Philippine radio station

Power Radio (DWSR)
- Daet; Philippines
- Broadcast area: Camarines Norte
- Frequency: 94.1 MHz
- Branding: 94.1 Power Radio

Programming
- Languages: Bicolano, Filipino
- Format: Pop MOR, News, Talk
- Affiliations: Radio Mindanao Network

Ownership
- Owner: Caceres Broadcasting Corporation

History
- First air date: 2010

Technical information
- Licensing authority: NTC
- Power: 5,000 watts

Links
- Website: https://powerradio941.wixsite.com/radio

DWSR (94.1 FM), broadcasting as 94.1 Power Radio, is a radio station owned and operated by Caceres Broadcasting Corporation. Its studios and transmitter are located at Door 3, San Ramon Bldg., Happy Homes Subd. Phase 3, Brgy. Magang, Daet.
