= DYVR =

Radio station in Roxas, Philippines

RMN Roxas (DYVR)
- Roxas City; Philippines
- Broadcast area: Northern Panay
- Frequency: 657 kHz
- Branding: DYVR RMN Roxas

Programming
- Languages: Capiznon, Filipino
- Format: News, Public Affairs, Talk, Drama
- Network: Radyo Mo Nationwide

Ownership
- Owner: Radio Mindanao Network
- Sister stations: 93.9 iFM

History
- First air date: 1980
- Former frequencies: 1377 kHz (1980–2004)
- Call sign meaning: Vicente Rivera (RMN founding member)

Technical information
- Licensing authority: NTC
- Class: CDE
- Power: 10,000 watts

Links
- Website: RMN Roxas

DYVR (657 AM) RMN Roxas is a radio station owned and operated by the Radio Mindanao Network. The station's studio and transmitter are located at Brgy. Punta Tabuc, Roxas, Capiz.

DYVR (AM) closely competed for the number one spot against Bombo Radyo, which went on air in the early 1990s.
