= DWON =

Radio station in Dagupan, Philippines

iFM Dagupan (DWON)
- Dagupan; Philippines
- Broadcast area: Pangasinan and surrounding areas
- Frequency: 104.7 MHz
- Branding: 104.7 iFM

Programming
- Languages: Pangasinense, Filipino
- Format: Contemporary MOR, OPM, News
- Network: iFM

Ownership
- Owner: Radio Mindanao Network

History
- First air date: June 19, 1978
- Former names: WON (1978–1992); Smile Radio (1992–1999); ONFM (1999–2002)

Technical information
- Licensing authority: NTC
- Power: 10,000 watts
- ERP: 27,000 watts

Links
- Webcast: Listen Live
- Website: iFM Dagupan

DWON (104.7 FM), broadcasting as 104.7 iFM, is a radio station owned and operated by the Radio Mindanao Network. The station's studio and transmitter are located at the 3/F Marigold Bldg., M.H. del Pilar St., Brgy. Herrero, Dagupan.

== History ==
DWON was the pioneer and the first FM station in Dagupan, established on June 19, 1978 as 104.7 WON. Dubbed as "The Amazing Beat of Dagupan", it carried a Top 40 format.

On August 16, 1992, the station was relaunched as Smile Radio 104.7. It became the first FM radio station in the market to carry a mass-based format. On November 23, 1999, the station rebranded as 1047 ONFM (pronounced as "one-o-four-seven"), with the slogan "Live it Up!". It shifted back to a Top 40 format.

On May 16, 2002, DWON was amongst the stations relaunched under RMN's iFM network and bought back its original mass-based format, with its first slogan "Hit after hit, iFM". In February 2004, it changed its slogan to "Ang FM ko I" and by 2006, the slogan was changed into "Pwede!". It was on March 2, 2009, when iFM changed its new logo and the slogan "Sa iFM, Siguradong Enjoy Ka!" as part of RMN's nationwide expansion.

On November 9, 2015, iFM launched its new logo and slogan "Ang Bestfriend Mo!". By January 2018, it adopted the slogan "iDOL" along with the return of the 7-note sound mnemonic from 2002.

During the Q2 of 2018, iFM carried-over the slogan "Ang Idol Kong FM" coinciding with the nationwide launch of its new jingle. In mid-2022, the station started carrying iFM Music and News for its news and talk programming.
