= DYXL-FM =

Radio station in Cebu City, Philippines

iFM Cebu (DYXL)
- Cebu City; Philippines
- Broadcast area: Metro Cebu and surrounding areas
- Frequency: 93.9 MHz
- Branding: 93.9 iFM

Programming
- Languages: Cebuano, Filipino
- Format: Contemporary MOR, News, Talk
- Network: iFM
- Affiliations: DYHP 612; DZXL News Manila (for RMN Network News newscast)

Ownership
- Owner: Radio Mindanao Network
- Sister stations: DYHP RMN Cebu

History
- First air date: 1976
- Former call signs: DYHP-FM (1976–1978)
- Former names: YXL 93.9 (1978–1992); Smile Radio (1992–1999); 939 XLFM (1999–2002)
- Call sign meaning: Extra Large (former branding)

Technical information
- Licensing authority: NTC
- Class: A, B, C, D, E
- Power: 10,000 watts
- ERP: 32,000 watts

Links
- Webcast: Listen Live (via Radyo PH)
- Website: iFM Cebu

DYXL (93.9 FM), broadcasting as 93.9 iFM, is a radio station owned and operated by Radio Mindanao Network. The station's studio and offices are located at the RMN Broadcast Center, G/F Capitol Central Hotel & Suites, N. Escario St. cor. F. Ramos Ext., Capitol Site, Cebu City, while its transmitter facilities are located in Sitio Seaside Asinan, Brgy. Basak San Nicolas, Cebu City (sharing tower site with sister station DYHP).

== History ==
=== 1976–1992: DYHP/YXL ===
DYXL was the third RMN FM station and the fourth FM station in Cebu, established in 1976 under the call letters DYHP. Two years later, the station was officially launched on September 9, 1978 as YXL 93.9. Dubbed as "The Beautiful Romance", it aired an easy listening format. Its first studio was located at Gilmore Bldg. along Manalili cor. Legaspi St. In a few years, YXL became one of the most-listening FM station in Cebu.

Most notable DJ's who worked on the station at that time including Joe Jammer, Naughty Dundee, Ric Ryan, Harry Harrison, Mighty Might, Sexy Susan, Johnny Kawa and Lady Daisy with an all English spiels.

In September 1988, in time for DYHP's 25th anniversary, YXL 93.9 celebrated its 10th anniversary with the theme "25-10 on September 13", a promo event held at Cebu Coliseum.

=== 1992–1999: Smile Radio ===
On August 16, 1992, the station was relaunched as Smile Radio 93.9 YXL and adopted the slogan "The Voice of Music", derived from its flagship station in Cagayan de Oro. It became the first FM radio station in the market to carry a mass-based format. In 1993, the station's studios moved to Gold Palace Bldg. in Osmeña Blvd.

The station ended its broadcast on November 22, 1999, a span of almost seven years under the Smile Radio network, which signified a branding to all RMN FM stations.

=== 1999–2002: XLFM ===
On November 23, 1999, the station rebranded as 939 XLFM (pronounced as "nine-three-nine") and carried the slogan "Live it Up!". It switched into a Top 40 format. It initially operated from 4:00 AM to 9:00 PM.

After almost 3 years, XLFM signed off the air for the last time on May 15, 2002.

=== 2002–present: iFM ===
On May 16, 2002, the station was relaunched as 93.9 iFM and switched back to its mass-based format, with its first slogan "Hit after hit, iFM". It expanded its broadcast hours to 20 hours daily, signing off at 12:00 MN. Several years later, iFM began broadcasting 24 hours a day.

According to the Nielsen Radio Audience Measurement Survey, iFM Cebu was dominates the over-all Number 1 FM station in Metro Cebu from 2007 to 2013.

In 2005, the station launched its love-advice program, Dear iFM, wherein listeners asking for letter senders to share their stories of love, heartaches, struggles, joys and even strange ones.

On March 2, 2009, iFM adapted the slogan Sa iFM, Siguradong Enjoy Ka!.

On May 26, 2012, the station, along with its sister station DYHP, went off the air and moved to its current home in Capitol Central Hotel and Suites along Capitol Site. It went back on air a day later.

In 2014, iFM leaned to a more localized approach in its programming, adopting the slogan LR, Lahi raaah!. On July 24, 2017, iFM changed its slogan to i Na Beh!, along with the return of the 7-note sound mnemonic from 2002.

On Q2 of 2018, iFM carried-over the slogan "Ang Idol Kong FM", coinciding the nationwide launch of its new jingle. Also by April 1, 2018, the slogan was changed into i Na Ta!, a variant of the slogan used by its Davao station, and on July 30, the station brought back its slogan LR! Lahi Ra!.

In 2019, iFM added news and talk to its format with the addition of simulcasting DYHP's morning program Straight To The Point.

In 2021, the station launched its first-ever radio drama anthology What's D Style, which first aired on other RMN stations in Visayas and Mindanao.

Amid the Typhoon Rai (Odette) on the evening of December 16, 2021, iFM simulcasted several programs from its sister station DYHP to provide news updates on the typhoon's impact in Cebu, Bohol and Leyte, and a day later, the station scaled down its programming with limited broadcast hours. On January 11, 2022, after the power was restored in the building, iFM formally returned to its regular programming.

From mid-2022 to 2023, the station carried the iFM Music and News branding. In addition, it began simulcasted RMN News Nationwide (later retitled RMN Network News) newscast from DZXL 558 Manila during mornings. In July that year, it launched its Sunday programs Gasa sa iFM, a public service program which listeners who asking to helped on-air, and Iwag sa iFM, an afternoon program which sharing their inspiring stories about love life.

On July 25, 2022, the station's transmitter facilities were transferred from Brgy. Kalunasan to Sitio Seaside Asinan, Brgy. Basak San Nicolas. It was inaugurated on September 13, coinciding with DYHP's 59th Anniversary.

On August 8, 2022, iFM revived Dear iFM after 7 years.

In June 2023, iFM adopted the tagline Mapugngan Pa Ni?.

On March 11, 2026, due to the impact of the increase in oil prices which has affected the operational costs, iFM reduced its daily terrestrial operations from round-the-clock to 21 hours, signing off at 12:00 midnight.
