= DWDY =

Radio station in Isabela, Philippines

- Cauayan; Philippines
- Broadcast area: Central Cagayan Valley and surrounding areas
- Frequency: 1107 kHz
- Branding: DWDY 1107

Programming
- Languages: Ilocano, Filipino
- Format: News, Public Affairs, Talk
- Affiliations: RMN Networks

Ownership
- Owner: Northeastern Broadcasting Services
- Sister stations: DWND

History
- First air date: December 1990
- Call sign meaning: Dy Family

Technical information
- Licensing authority: NTC
- Power: 10,000 watts

DWDY (1107 AM) is a radio station owned and operated by Northeastern Broadcasting Services. The station's studio and transmitter are located in Isabela Hotel, Brgy. Minante 1, Cauayan, Isabela.
