= DXBC =

DXBC stands for DirectX Container, the older binary file format for compiled shaders targeting the DirectX runtime.

It may also refer to:

- DXBC-AM, an AM station broadcasting in Butuan, branded as RMN
- DXBC-FM, a defunct FM station in General Santos
- DXBC-TV, a television station broadcasting in General Santos, branded as Brigada News TV
