= DYHP =

Radio station in Cebu City, Philippines

RMN Cebu (DYHP)
- Cebu City; Philippines
- Broadcast area: Central Visayas and surrounding areas
- Frequency: 612 kHz
- Branding: DYHP RMN Cebu 612

Programming
- Languages: Cebuano, Filipino
- Format: News, Public Affairs, Talk, Drama
- Network: Radyo Mo Nationwide

Ownership
- Owner: Radio Mindanao Network
- Sister stations: 93.9 iFM

History
- First air date: September 13, 1963
- Former names: Ang Radyo Natin (1970s-1987); Radyo Agong (1988–1999)
- Former frequencies: 670 kHz (1963–1978)
- Call sign meaning: Herald of the Philippines

Technical information
- Licensing authority: NTC
- Class: CDE
- Power: 10,000 watts
- ERP: 50,000 watts

Links
- Webcast: Watch Live
- Website: RMN Cebu

DYHP (612 AM) RMN Cebu is a radio station owned and operated by the Radio Mindanao Network. Its studios and offices are located at the RMN Broadcast Center, G/F Capitol Central Hotel and Suites, N. Escario St., cor. F. Ramos Ext., Capitol Site, Cebu City, while its transmitter facilities are located in Sitio Seaside Asinan, Brgy. Basak San Nicolas, Cebu City (sharing tower site with 93.9 iFM). DYHP is the pioneer AM radio station in Cebu.

DYHP also houses its own production center which supplies drama programming to Cebuano-speaking RMN stations in Visayas and Mindanao. It is located at Room 302, 3/F Jose R. Martinez Bldg., Osmeña Blvd., Cebu City.

== Broadcasting history ==
DYHP commenced its operations on September 13, 1963 under the auspices of the Philippine Herald newspaper and Inter-Island Broadcasting Corporation. Dubbed as The Sound of the City, it aired a news and music format. It was the second RMN station established in Visayas with DYRI and the fourth commercial radio station in the city. It was first located in Goodrich Bldg. along Legaspi St.

On September 21, 1972, when then-President Ferdinand Marcos declared Martial Law from the issuance of Proclamation 1081, DYHP was among the casualties. Several years later, the station returned to the airwaves as Ang Radyo Natin, taken from DZXL in Manila. Its success led to the opening of sister station DYHP-FM in 1976.

In 1978, RMN established a Cebuano drama production center. Among its former drama talents were Susan Perez (now Aliño), Elma Vestil, Nelson Tantano, Teresa Diez, Esper Palicte, Janice Gimena, Debbie Santa Cruz, Carolyn Marquez, Wilma Silva and more. Its first radio drama was Kun Ako Ang Pasultihon ("Kung Ikaw ang Tatanungin"/"If I Were To Be Told"), a comedy drama written and directed by radio personality and Cebu Provincial Board Member Julian "Teban" Daan. The drama talks about ordinary problems of ordinary people to which Daan and Priscilla Raganas, RMN's premiere leading lady gets to pitch in their advices as ordinary people. On the other hand, Kini Ang Akong Suliran ("Ito ang Aking Suliranin"/"This Is My Problem") is a program which dramatizes legal and medical problems send by listeners, which will be advised by then Dra. Lourdes Libres Rosaroso, while Handumanan Sa Usa Ka Awit ("Ala-ala ng Isang Awit"/"Memory Of A Song") narrates and give stories of love sent by RMN's avid listeners to the drama production center's mailing currently hosted by Priscilla Raganas (originally hosted by Perez Aliño until her departure to DYSS).

On November 23, 1978, following the switch from the NARBA-mandated 10 kHz to the adoption of the 9 kHz spacing implemented by the Geneva Frequency Plan of 1975 on AM radio stations in the Philippines and across the Asia-Pacific region, DYHP transferred from 670 kHz to its current frequency of 612 kHz.

In 1980, the station's studios moved to its new location in Gilmore Bldg. along Manalili cor. Legaspi St.

On New Year's Day, January 1, 1988, the station shifted its programming to news and public affairs under the name Radyo Agong. On September 13, 1988, DYHP celebrates its 25th anniversary with the theme, "25-10 on September 13" to be held at the Cebu Coliseum included promos that will giving more prizes to the listeners for each two radio stations, as well as furnitures, appliances and radio sets to be given away.

During the early 1990s, DYHP began simulcasting some of its programs thru its stations and affiliates in Visayas and Northern Mindanao.

In 1992, the station transferred its studios to Gold Palace Bldg. along Osmeña Blvd.

On March 2, 2009, as part of its nationwide expansion, RMN's AM stations started carrying the Radyo Mo Nationwide branding. During its relaunch, RMN was released a new corporate station ID and a jingle entitled, "Tatak RMN", sung by Wency Cornejo. At the same time, the station's transmitter facilities moved to its new transmitter site in White Road, Brgy. Inayawan for better signal reception.

On May 26, 2012, DYHP, along with its sister station DYXL, transferred to its current home at the Capitol Central Hotel & Suites (formerly The Professional Group Center) along Capitol Site, and its Production Center transferred to its current home in Jose R. Martinez Bldg. along Osmeña Blvd. to adjust to modern broadcast settings. From June 2014 until December 2021, the station was an affiliate of the Cebu Catholic Television Network (CCTN-47) and airing a simulcast of their flagship local newscast Sayri 47.

In March 2019, DYHP commenced its round-the-clock broadcasting service. On June 28 of that year, the station broadcast a story of a person, along with their family, who survived a storm (possibly Typhoon Haiyan), only to have their mother die from sickness not long after.

DYHP went off the air for the second time on December 16, 2021, after its studios and transmitter were heavily damaged by Typhoon Rai (Odette) on the evening. During the time being, most of the station's programming were aired on 93.9 iFM as well as their official Facebook page. Two days later, it returned on-air with limited broadcast hours.

The station returned to its regular programming on January 4, 2022, after the power was restored in Capitol Central Hotel & Suites.

On September 13, 2022, as part of its 59th anniversary, DYHP's new transmitter site in Sitio Seaside Asinan, Brgy. Basak San Nicolas was inaugurated. Its old transmitter site is now occupied by National Grid Corporation of the Philippines.

On September 13, 2023, DYHP celebrated its 60th anniversary. With that, it launched its new jingle.
