= DXDC =

Radio station in Davao City, Philippines

RMN Davao (DXDC)
- Davao City; Philippines
- Broadcast area: Davao Region and surrounding areas
- Frequency: 621 kHz
- Branding: DXDC RMN Davao

Programming
- Languages: Cebuano, Filipino
- Format: News, Public Affairs, Talk, Drama
- Network: Radyo Mo Nationwide

Ownership
- Owner: RMN Networks
- Sister stations: 93.9 iFM News

History
- First air date: June 12, 1960
- Former frequencies: 610 kHz (1960–1978)
- Call sign meaning: Davao City

Technical information
- Licensing authority: NTC
- Class: C, D, E
- Power: 10,000 watts
- ERP: 75,000 watts

Links
- Webcast: Listen Live
- Website: RMN Davao

DXDC (621 AM) RMN Davao is a radio station owned and operated by the Radio Mindanao Network. The station's studio is located at the 2/F San Vicente Bldg., Iñigo St. cor. Bonifacio St., Davao City, and its transmitter is located at Gatdula Heights, Madapo Hills, Davao City.
