= DYIC =

Radio station in Iloilo City, Philippines

iFM Iloilo (DYIC)
- Iloilo City; Philippines
- Broadcast area: Iloilo, Guimaras and surrounding areas
- Frequency: 95.1 MHz
- Branding: 95.1 iFM

Programming
- Languages: Hiligaynon, Filipino
- Format: Contemporary MOR, OPM, News
- Network: iFM

Ownership
- Owner: RMN Networks
- Sister stations: DYRI RMN Iloilo

History
- First air date: 1980
- Former names: YIC/95IC (1980–1992); Smile Radio (1992–1999); ICFM (1999–2002)
- Call sign meaning: Iloilo City

Technical information
- Licensing authority: NTC
- Power: 10,000 watts
- ERP: 15,000 watts

Links
- Webcast: Listen Live
- Website: iFM Iloilo

DYIC (95.1 FM), broadcasting as 95.1 iFM, is a radio station owned and operated by the Radio Mindanao Network in the Philippines. The station's studio is located at St. Anne Bldg., Luna St., La Paz, Iloilo City, and its transmitter is located along Coastal Rd., Brgy. Hinactacan, La Paz, Iloilo City.

== History ==
DYIC was RMN's seventh FM station, established in 1980. Branded as 95.1 YIC, it aired a Top 40 format. Years later, the station rebranded as 95IC and adapted the tagline "Red Hot Radio" and later become Power 95.

On August 16, 1992, the station was relaunched as Smile Radio 95.1 and switched to a mass-based format.

On November 23, 1999, it rebranded as 951 ICFM (pronounced as "nine-five-one") and bought back its Top 40 format with the slogan "Live It Up!".

On May 16, 2002, the station was relaunched once more as 95.1 iFM and bought back its mass-based format.
