= DXRS-AM =

Radio station in Surigao City, Philippines

RMN Surigao (DXRS)
- Surigao City; Philippines
- Broadcast area: Surigao del Norte, Dinagat Islands and surrounding areas
- Frequency: 918 kHz
- Branding: DXRS RMN Surigao

Programming
- Languages: Surigaonon, Filipino
- Format: News, Public Affairs, Talk, Drama
- Network: Radyo Mo Nationwide

Ownership
- Owner: Radio Mindanao Network
- Sister stations: 94.1 iFM

History
- First air date: April 18, 1969
- Former frequencies: 1150 kHz (1970–1978); 1206 kHz (1978–2010)
- Call sign meaning: RMN Surigao

Technical information
- Licensing authority: NTC
- Class: CDE
- Power: 10,000 watts

Links
- Website: RMN Surigao

DXRS (918 AM) RMN Surigao is a radio station owned and operated by the Radio Mindanao Network. The station's studio are located at the RMN Bldg., Rizal St., Surigao City, while the transmitter is located in Brgy. Sabang, Surigao City

In December 2021, the station went off the air after its transmitter was damaged by Typhoon Odette. The following month, several of its programs returned on air, this time on its sister station 94.1 iFM under the interim RMN iFM surigao. In late September 2023, it returned on air after the installation of its new transmitter in Brgy. Sabang.
