= DZWR =

Radio station in Baguio, Philippines

99.9 Country (DZWR)
- Baguio; Philippines
- Broadcast area: Benguet, La Union and surrounding areas
- Frequency: 99.9 MHz
- Branding: 99.9 Country

Programming
- Languages: English, Filipino
- Format: Country, Religious Radio
- Affiliations: Catholic Media Network

Ownership
- Owner: Mountain Province Broadcasting Corporation
- Sister stations: DZWT Radyo Totoo

History
- First air date: 1977
- Former names: Super FM (until 1991); WR Pinoy (1991-1995); Magic (1995-2013)

Technical information
- Licensing authority: NTC
- Power: 5,000 watts
- ERP: 10,000 watts

DZWR (99.9 FM), broadcasting as 99.9 Country, is a radio station owned and operated by the Mountain Province Broadcasting Corporation, the media arm of the Diocese of Baguio. The station's studio and transmitter are located at the MPBC Broadcast Center, #72 Fr. Carlos St., Bishop's House Compound, Brgy. Kabayanihan, Baguio. It is the only station in the Philippines airing a Country format.

== History ==
Established in 1977, DZWR was one of the pioneer FM stations in Baguio, along with DZYB and DWHB. It was formerly located at the St. Louis University Compound along A. Bonifacio St. In the 80s, it carried the Super FM branding with a Soft AC format.

In 1991, it rebranded as WR Pinoy and switched to an all-OPM format. In 1995, it rebranded as Magic 99.9 and switched to a Top 40 format. Among the station's personalities during that era include the late Peter John (de Vera), Gloria Guinto, Ms. Em, Doctor J (Jay Guasch), Dark Man (Jorge Castro), Daffy D. (Andrew Piñero), the "Big Mouth" Murphy, Bugs B., DJ Ariele, Chai Aquino, Lina Sotto, Brother Jim.

In the early 2000s, it shifted to a Country format under the helm of Rev. Fr. Paul C. Basilio. In 2013, the Magic branding was dropped and the station is simply known as 99.9 Country. By this time, the station moved to its present home inside the Bishop's House Compound. Its old studios are now occupied by The Halfway Home for Boys, an SLU-owned Foundation.
