= DWRS =

Radio station in Vigan, Ilocos Sur

Commando Radio (DWRS)
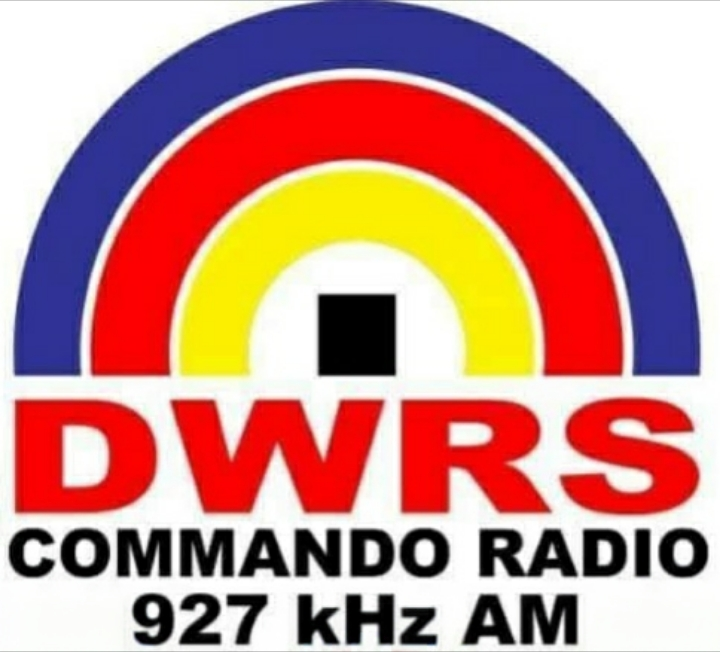
- Vigan; Philippines
- Broadcast area: Ilocos Sur, Abra and surrounding areas
- Frequency: 927 kHz
- Branding: DWRS Commando Radio

Programming
- Languages: Ilocano, Filipino
- Format: News, Public Affairs, Talk
- Affiliations: Radio Mindanao Network

Ownership
- Owner: Solidnorth Broadcasting System

History
- First air date: September 21, 1979
- Call sign meaning: Radio Solidnorth

Technical information
- Licensing authority: NTC
- Power: 5,000 watts
- ERP: 12,000 watts

Links
- Website: https://dwrscommandoradio.com/

DWRS (927 AM) Commando Radio is a radio station owned and operated by Solidnorth Broadcasting System. The station's studio and transmitter are located in SBS Bldg., Quirino Blvd., Brgy. Tamag, Vigan.
