= DXMY =

Radio station in Cotabato City, Philippines

RMN Cotabato (DXMY)
Cotabato City; Philippines
- Broadcast area: Maguindanao del Norte and surrounding areas
- Frequency: 90.9 MHz
- Branding: DXMY RMN Cotabato

Programming
- Languages: Maguindanaon, Filipino
- Format: News, Public Affairs, Talk
- Network: Radyo Mo Nationwide

Ownership
- Owner: RMN Networks

History
- First air date: 1971 (on AM); 2021 (on FM)
- Former frequencies: 729 kHz (1971–2022)

Technical information
- Licensing authority: NTC
- Class: C, D, E
- Power: 5,000 watts

Links
- Website: RMN Cotabato

DXMY (90.9 FM) RMN Cotabato is a radio station owned and operated by the Radio Mindanao Network. The station's studio is located along Esteros Hi-way, Brgy. Rosary Heights 10, Cotabato City, and its transmitter is located at No. 20 Cando St., Brgy. Tamontaka II, Cotabato City.

The station went off the air on November 5, 2020, due to the technical upgrades and the relocation of its transmitter from Rosary Heights 10 to Tamontaka II. On May 31, 2021, DXMY went back on air, this time on 90.9 FM under the name RMN iFM Cotabato. However, iFM's bumpers are only used for its music blocks.
