= DWKD-FM =

Radio station in Isabela, Philippines

iFM Cauayan (DWKD)
- Cauayan; Philippines
- Broadcast area: Isabela and surrounding areas
- Frequency: 98.5 MHz
- Branding: 98.5 iFM

Programming
- Languages: Ilocano, Filipino
- Format: Contemporary MOR, News, Talk
- Network: iFM

Ownership
- Owner: Radio Mindanao Network

History
- First air date: 2017
- Former names: RMN Cauayan (2017–2019)

Technical information
- Licensing authority: NTC
- Class: CDE
- Power: 5,000 watts

Links
- Webcast: 98.5 iFM Live
- Website: iFM Cauayan

DWKD (98.5 FM), broadcasting as 98.5 iFM, is a radio station owned and operated by the Radio Mindanao Network. The station's studio and transmitter are located at the 3rd Floor, OMA Bldg. Rizal Ave., Cauayan, Isabela.
