= DXWR =

Radio station in Zamboanga City, Philippines

iFM Zamboanga (DXWR)
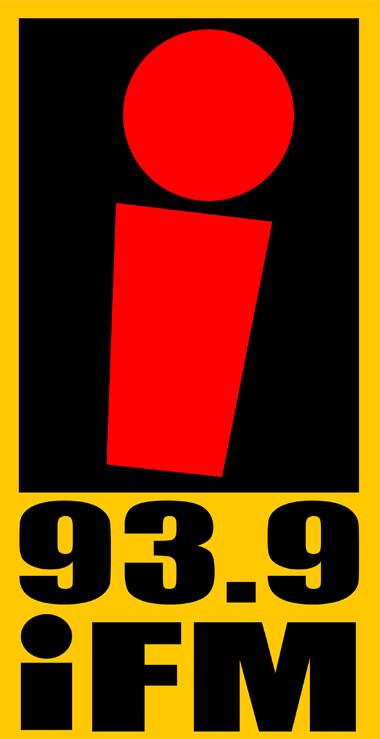
- Zamboanga City; Philippines
- Broadcast area: Zamboanga City, Basilan and surrounding areas
- Frequency: 96.3 MHz
- Branding: 96.3 Radyo iFM Music & News

Programming
- Languages: Chavacano, Filipino
- Format: Contemporary MOR, News, Talk
- Network: iFM

Ownership
- Owner: Radio Mindanao Network
- Sister stations: DXRZ RMN Zamboanga

History
- First air date: October 10, 2002

Technical information
- Licensing authority: NTC
- Class: CDE
- Power: 5,000 watts
- ERP: 32,000 watts

Links
- Website: iFM Zamboanga

DXWR (96.3 FM), broadcasting as 96.3 Radyo iFM Music & News, is a radio station owned and operated by Radio Mindanao Network. The station's studio and transmitter are located at the 2/F Zameveco Bldg., Pilar St., Zamboanga City.

== History ==
iFM started operations on October 10, 2002 with the slogan "Hit after hit, iFM". It carried a mass-based format.

On March 2, 2009, it was amongst iFM stations changed its new logo and the slogan "Sa iFM, Siguradong Enjoy Ka!" as part of RMN's nationwide expansion. This was later on late-2011, when iFM launched a new slogan called "Ambot sa Kambing na may Bangs!".

On June 25, 2018, the station added news and talk to its format, with news provided by its AM sister station DXRZ as 96.3 iFM Music & News. It is the 2nd news/music-formatted FM station in the city after Brigada News FM. On July 30, 2018, the station is the only iFM regional station that returned to the 2002 logo, adopted from its Manila station. On January 30, 2024, it added Radyo to its branding.
