= DYHB =

Radio station in Bacolod, Philippines

RMN Bacolod (DYHB)
- Bacolod; Philippines
- Broadcast area: Northern Negros Occidental and surrounding areas
- Frequency: 747 kHz
- Branding: DYHB RMN Bacolod

Programming
- Languages: Hiligaynon, Filipino
- Format: News, Public Affairs, Talk, Drama
- Network: Radyo Mo Nationwide

Ownership
- Owner: Radio Mindanao Network
- Sister stations: 94.3 iFM

History
- First air date: 1964
- Former names: Ang Radyo Natin (1970s-1987); Radyo Agong (1987–1999)
- Former frequencies: 730 kHz (1964–1978)
- Call sign meaning: Herald of Bacolod

Technical information
- Licensing authority: NTC
- Class: C D E
- Power: 10,000 watts

Links
- Webcast: Listen Live

DYHB (747 AM) RMN Bacolod is a radio station owned and operated by the Radio Mindanao Network. The station's studio is located at RMN Broadcast Center, 17th Lacson St., while its transmitter is located at Sitio Aning, Brgy. Pahanocoy, Bacolod.
