= DXIC-AM =

Radio station in Iligan, Philippines

RMN Iligan (DXIC)
- Iligan; Philippines
- Broadcast area: Lanao del Norte and surrounding areas
- Frequency: 711 kHz
- Branding: DXIC RMN Iligan 711

Programming
- Languages: Cebuano, Filipino
- Format: News, Public Affairs, Talk, Drama
- Network: Radyo Mo Nationwide

Ownership
- Owner: RMN Networks
- Sister stations: 102.3 iFM

History
- First air date: 1953
- Call sign meaning: Iligan City

Technical information
- Licensing authority: NTC
- Class: C, D & E
- Power: 5,000 watts

Links
- Website: RMN Iligan

DXIC (711 AM) RMN Iligan is a radio station owned and operated by the Radio Mindanao Network. The station's studio and transmitter are located at Brgy. Bayug, Iligan. Established as the second RMN station after DXCC in Cagayan de Oro, DXIC is the pioneer and lone AM station in the city.
