= DWHP =

iFM Laoag (DWHP)
- Laoag; Philippines
- Broadcast area: Ilocos Norte and surrounding areas
- Frequency: 99.5 MHz
- Branding: 99.5 iFM

Programming
- Languages: Ilocano, Filipino
- Format: Contemporary MOR, News, Talk
- Network: iFM

Ownership
- Owner: Radio Mindanao Network

History
- First air date: 1978
- Former names: DWHP (1978–1985); 99.5 WHP (1985–1992); Smile Radio (1992–1999); 995 HPFM (1999–2002)
- Call sign meaning: Herald of the Philippines

Technical information
- Licensing authority: NTC
- Class: C, D, E
- Power: 10,000 watts
- ERP: 21,000 watts

Links
- Webcast: Listen Live
- Website: iFM Laoag

DWHP (99.5 FM), broadcasting as 99.5 iFM, is a radio station owned and operated by Radio Mindanao Network. The station's studio and transmitter are located at the Hernandez Bldg., F. R. Castro St. cor. Dr. D. Samonte St., Laoag.
