= DZWT =

Radio station in Baguio, Philippines

Radyo Totoo Baguio (DZWT)
- Baguio; Philippines
- Broadcast area: Benguet, La Union and surrounding areas
- Frequency: 540 kHz
- Branding: DZWT 540 Radyo Totoo

Programming
- Languages: Ilocano, Filipino
- Format: News, Public Affairs, Talk, Religious Radio
- Affiliations: Catholic Media Network; Radio Mindanao Network

Ownership
- Owner: Mountain Province Broadcasting Corporation
- Sister stations: 99.9 Country

History
- First air date: March 12, 1965

Technical information
- Licensing authority: NTC
- Power: 10,000 watts
- ERP: 15,000 watts

DZWT (540 AM) Radyo Totoo is a radio station owned and operated by Mountain Province Broadcasting Corporation, the media arm of the Diocese of Baguio. The station's studio is located at the MPBC Broadcast Center, #72 Fr. Carlos St., Bishop's House Compound, Brgy. Kabayanihan, Baguio, and its transmitter is located at Brgy. Beckel, La Trinidad, Benguet.
