= DWND =

Radio station in Isabela, Philippines

Cauayan; Philippines
- Broadcast area: Isabela and surrounding areas
- Frequency: 88.5 MHz
- Branding: DWND 88.5

Programming
- Languages: Ilocano, Filipino
- Format: Contemporary MOR, OPM, Talk
- Affiliations: RMN Networks

Ownership
- Owner: Northeastern Broadcasting Services
- Sister stations: DWDY

History
- First air date: December 1990
- Call sign meaning: Northeastern Broadcasting Services of Dy Family

Technical information
- Licensing authority: NTC
- Power: 5 kW

DWND (88.5 FM) is a radio station owned and operated by Northeastern Broadcasting Services. Its studios and transmitter are located in Isabela Hotel, Brgy. Minante 1, Cauayan, Isabela.
