= DXMB-AM =

Radio station in Bukidnon, Philippines

RMN Malaybalay (DXMB)
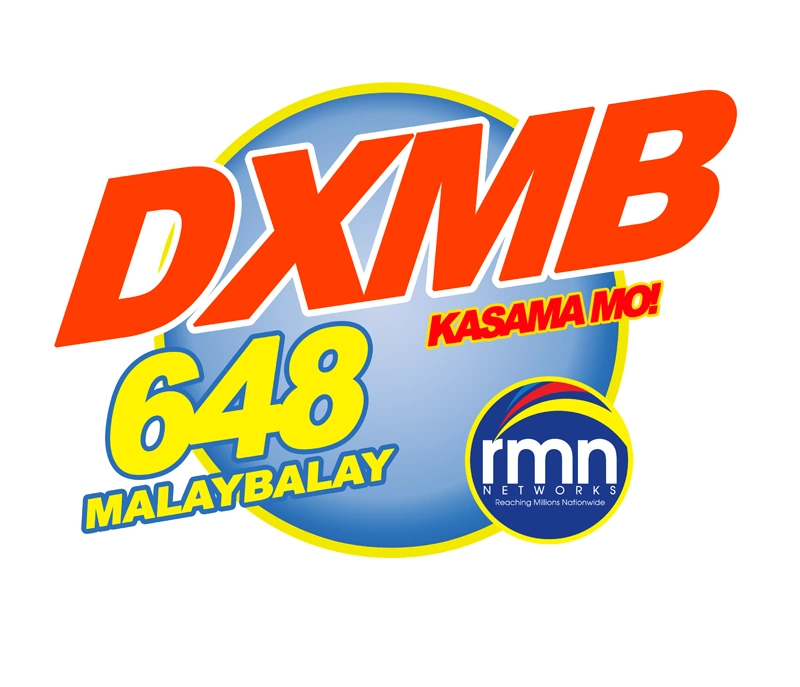

Malaybalay; Philippines
- Broadcast area: Bukidnon and surrounding areas
- Frequency: 648 kHz
- Branding: DXMB RMN Malaybalay

Programming
- Languages: Cebuano, Filipino
- Format: News, Public Affairs, Talk, Drama
- Network: Radyo Mo Nationwide

Ownership
- Owner: Radio Mindanao Network

History
- First air date: May 15, 1980 (under RMN) (Date of establishment under former owner/s unknown.)
- Former frequencies: 610 kHz (until 1978)
- Call sign meaning: Malaybalay, Bukidnon

Technical information
- Licensing authority: NTC
- Class: C, D, E
- Power: 10,000 watts

Links
- Website: RMN Malaybalay

DXMB (648 AM) RMN Malaybalay is a radio station owned and operated by the Radio Mindanao Network. The station's studio and transmitter are located at Purok 2, Brgy. San Jose, Malaybalay.

== History ==
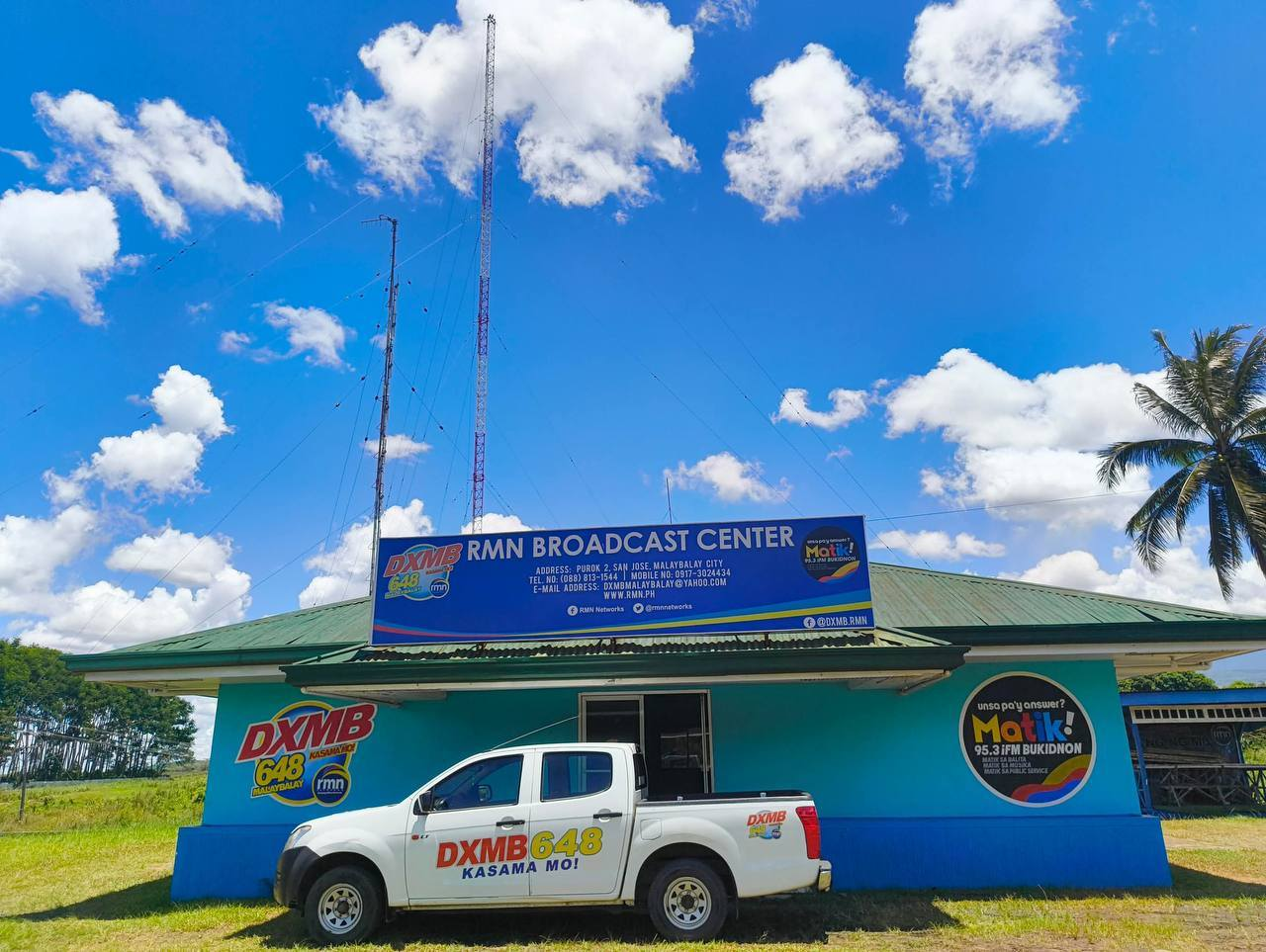
Studio and Transmitter in Brgy. San Jose, Malaybalay

By early 1970s, DXMB-AM, probably the second radio station both in Malaybalay and in Bukidnon, then at 610 kHz and with 1-kW power, was being operated along Claro M. Recto Ave.; its franchise was owned by the Lopez family through Eduardo Lopez & Co., and operated by Ruta Broadcasting, also owned by Eduardo. The station used custom-built equipment.

The station became the only operating in the municipality since Catholic-run DXBB-AM was closed by the government in 1976 yet its license had never been revoked. (The latter would be relaunched as present-day DXDB-AM in 1991). Its frequency was transferred in 1978 to present-day 648 kHz.

By the end of 1970s, Malaybalay-based Ruta had at least six AM radio stations; the rest were located in Visayas. (Note: Aside from DXMB-AM, other stations under Ruta Broadcasting were: DYFJ 1340/1035 San Jose, currently inactive; DYKR 1440, 1460 or 1480/1485 Kalibo, now under RMN; DYLL 1170 Tacloban, currently inactive. Frequency is now under DYSL in Southern Leyte while callsign is now in Ilo-Ilo, both affiliated with Presidential Broadcasting Service; DYOG 860 Catbalogan, later 936 Calbayog (Recta Broadcasting in another sorurce), now under Presidential Broadcast Service; DYRI 1280/1107 Iloilo City, now under RMN)

The patriarch later decided to sell the station as he could no longer manage it. In 1980, the station was acquired by the Radio Mindanao Network. Ruta though remained as the station's sales representative by 1990. The station's power was increased to 5 kW by 1990s.

Unlike other RMN AM radio stations primarily focusing on news, commentaries and public affairs, the station has its unique programming focusing on entertainment, mainly on drama.
