= DXXL =

Radio station in Davao City, Philippines

iFM News Davao (DXXL)
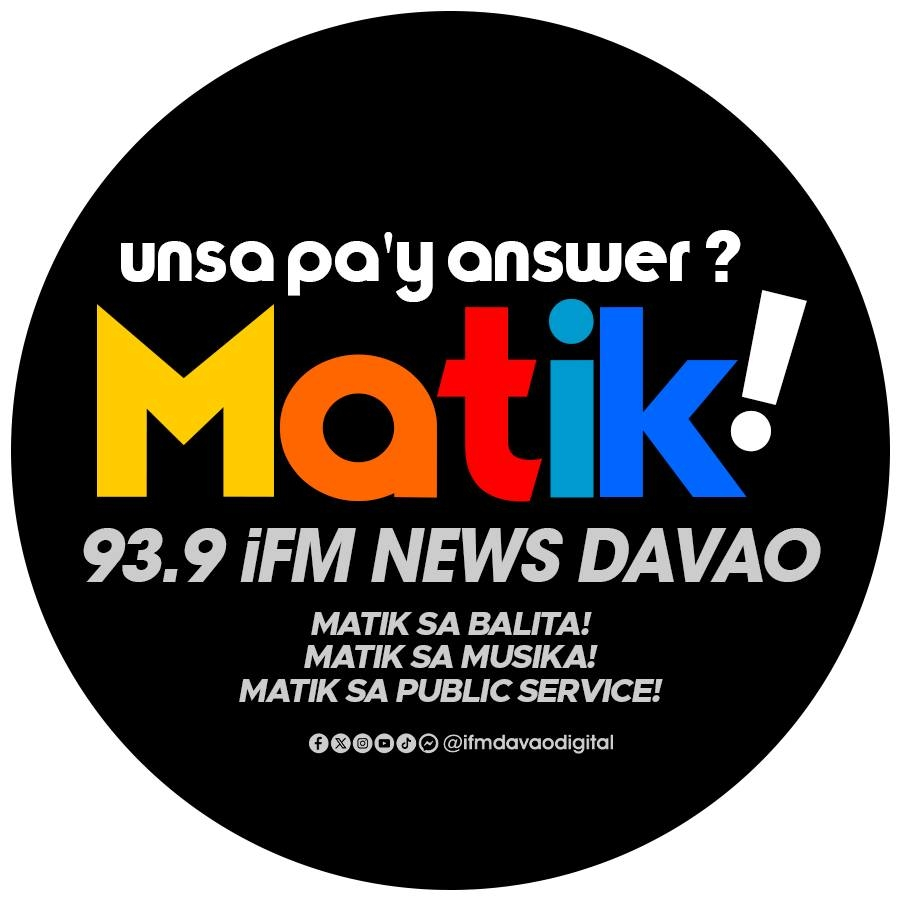
- Davao City; Philippines
- Broadcast area: Metro Davao and surrounding areas
- Frequency: 93.9 MHz (HD Radio)
- RDS: iFM93.9
- Branding: 93.9 iFM News

Programming
- Languages: Cebuano, Filipino
- Format: Contemporary MOR, OPM, News
- Network: iFM

Ownership
- Owner: Radio Mindanao Network
- Sister stations: DXDC RMN Davao

History
- First air date: 1977
- Former names: 93.9 XL-FM (1977–1992); Smile Radio (1992–1999); 939 XLFM (1999–2002)
- Call sign meaning: Extra Extra Large

Technical information
- Licensing authority: NTC
- Class: C, D, E
- Power: 10,000 watts
- ERP: 31,500 watts

Links
- Website: iFM Davao

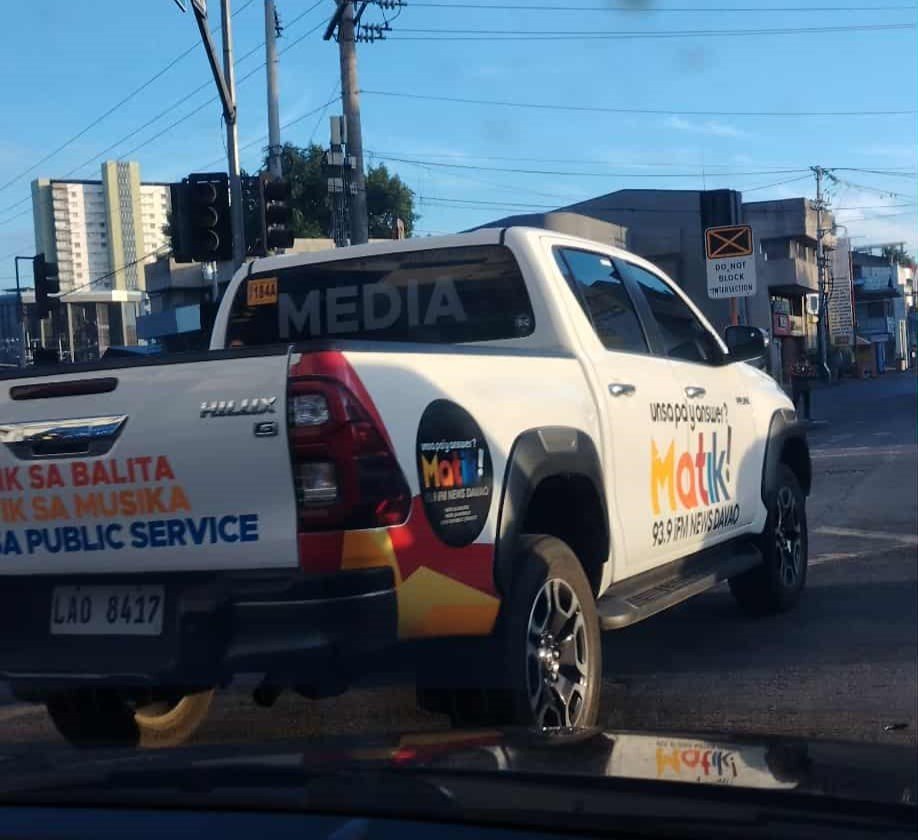
The media car of 93.9 iFM News Davao at crossing R. Magsaysay St. and C.M. Recto Ave. in Davao City, Philippines. Taken from inside my car.

DXXL (93.9 FM), broadcasting as 93.9 iFM News, is a radio station owned and operated by the Radio Mindanao Network. The station's studio is located at the 2/F San Vicente Bldg., Iñigo St. cor. Bonifacio St., Davao City, and its transmitter is located along Broadcast Ave., Shrine Hills, Matina, Davao City.

== History ==
Established in 1977, DXXL was RMN's fourth FM station in Mindanao for soft launch. A year later, the station began operations as 93.9 XL-FM, carrying a CHR/Top 40 with the slogan "The Pride and Joy of Davao City". At that time, its original studio and transmitter were located along Shrine Hills, Matina. During the 80s, it was among the top-rated stations in the city, along with DXSS and DXBM. On August 16, 1992, the station was relaunched as Smile Radio 93.9 XL-FM with a mass-based format. On November 23, 1999, it rebranded as 939 XLFM and switched back to a CHR/Top 40 format, with its slogan "Live it Up!". On May 16, 2002, the station rebranded as 93.9 iFM and went back to a mass-based format. In 2022, it began using its tagline Unsa pa'y answer? Matik! along with other iFM stations in Mindanao. In 2024, it started carrying iFM News branding.

From March 11 to August 2026, due to the impact of the increase in oil prices, iFM reduced its daily round-the-clock operations to 21 hours.
