= DYHT =

Radio station in Bacolod, Philippines

iFM Bacolod (DYHT)
- Bacolod; Philippines
- Broadcast area: Northern Negros Occidental and surrounding areas
- Frequency: 94.3 MHz
- RDS: iFM iDOL
- Branding: 94.3 iFM

Programming
- Languages: Hiligaynon, Filipino
- Format: Contemporary MOR, OPM, News
- Network: iFM

Ownership
- Owner: Radio Mindanao Network
- Sister stations: DYHB RMN Bacolod

History
- First air date: 1978
- Former names: HTFM (1978–1992, 1999-2002); Smile Radio (1992–1999)
- Call sign meaning: HiT

Technical information
- Licensing authority: NTC
- Class: C, D, E
- Power: 10,000 watts
- ERP: 27,000 watts
- HAAT: 87 meters

Links
- Website: iFM Bacolod

DYHT (94.3 FM), broadcasting as 94.3 iFM, is a radio station owned and operated by the Radio Mindanao Network. The station's studio is located at the RMN Broadcast Center, 17th Lacson St., Bacolod, while its transmitter is located at Sitio Aning, Brgy. Pahanocoy, Bacolod.

== History ==
DYHT was RMN's 6th FM station in Bacolod, established in 1978. Branded as 94.3 HTFM, it carried a Top 40 format. On August 16, 1992, the station was rebranded as Smile Radio 94.3. On November 23, 1999, it was rebranded back as 943 HTFM, with the slogan "Live it Up!". Some of the programs aired at that time were "The Alternative Zone", "Power 20 Hit Show", "Free Rock" and "Absolute Replay". On May 16, 2002, the station was relaunched as 94.3 iFM and switched to a mass-based format.
