= DWNX =

Radio station in Naga, Camarines Sur, Philippines

RMN Naga (DWNX)
- Milaor; Philippines
- Broadcast area: Camarines Sur and surrounding areas
- Frequency: 91.1 MHz
- Branding: DWNX RMN Naga

Programming
- Languages: Bicolano, Filipino
- Format: News, Public Affairs, Talk
- Network: Radyo Mo Nationwide

Ownership
- Owner: RMN Networks

History
- First air date: February 14, 1992
- Former names: NXFM (February 14, 1992-August 15, 1992); Smile Radio (August 16, 1992-May 30, 1996)
- Call sign meaning: Naga's Xtra Large

Technical information
- Licensing authority: NTC
- Power: 10,000 watts
- ERP: 32,000 watts
- Repeater: 1296 kHz

Links
- Webcast: Listen Live
- Website: RMN Naga

DWNX (91.1 FM) RMN Naga is a radio station owned and operated by the Radio Mindanao Network. The station's studio and transmitter are located at the RMN Broadcast Center, Maharlika Highway, Brgy. Del Rosario, Milaor.

== History ==
DWNX was inaugurated on February 14, 1992 with the slogan Naga's FM station. It carried a Top 40 format. On August 16, 1992, the station was rebranded as Smile Radio, with a mass-based format. On June 1, 1996, it was relaunched with an AM on FM format, this time using the RMN branding. At that time, the station's reformat was initially criticized by some listeners due to its radical change of format. It eventually went on to become the number 1 radio station in that format in Bicol. In late 2016, DWNX opened a relay AM station on 1611 kHz to serve areas outside Bicol region.

There were plans for DWNX to transfer its broadcast to AM and launch iFM on its current frequency. However, due to consistent success of the station, the plan was shelved. On May 25, 2022, DWNX's AM relay moved to 1296 kHz.
