= DXRZ =

Radio station in Zamboanga City, Philippines

RMN Zamboanga (DXRZ)
- Zamboanga City; Philippines
- Broadcast area: Zamboanga City, Basilan and surrounding areas
- Frequency: 900 kHz
- Branding: DXRZ RMN Zamboanga

Programming
- Languages: Chavacano, Filipino
- Format: News, Public Affairs, Talk, Drama
- Network: Radyo Mo Nationwide

Ownership
- Owner: RMN Networks
- Sister stations: 96.3 Radyo iFM

History
- First air date: 1961
- Call sign meaning: RMN Zamboanga

Technical information
- Licensing authority: NTC
- Class: CDE
- Power: 5,000 watts

Links
- Website: RMN Zamboanga

DXRZ (900 AM) RMN Zamboanga is a radio station owned and operated by the Radio Mindanao Network. The station's studio is located at the Zamaveco Bldg., Pilar St., Zamboanga City, while its transmitter is located in Purok 7, Tropical Tugbungan, Zamboanga City.

Prior to the station's acquisition by RMN in 1992, DXRZ was originally owned by UM Broadcasting Network. It was known as Radyo Agong in the 90s and 2000s.
