= DXIX-FM =

Radio station in Iligan, Philippines

iFM Iligan (DXIX)
- Iligan; Philippines
- Broadcast area: Lanao del Norte, parts of Lanao del Sur
- Frequency: 102.3 MHz
- Branding: 102.3 iFM

Programming
- Languages: Cebuano, Filipino
- Format: Contemporary MOR, OPM
- Network: iFM

Ownership
- Owner: RMN Networks
- Sister stations: DXIC RMN Iligan

History
- First air date: 1978
- Former call signs: DXYX (1978–2002)
- Former names: DXYX (1978–1992); Smile Radio (1992–1999); YXFM (1999–2002)
- Call sign meaning: Roman number for 19

Technical information
- Licensing authority: NTC
- Class: C, D, E
- Power: 5,000 watts
- ERP: 10,500 watts

Links
- Website: http://www.rmn.ph/

DXIX (102.3 FM), on-air as 102.3 iFM, is a radio station owned and operated by the Radio Mindanao Network. Its studio, office and transmitter are located at Bayug, Iligan.

== History ==
The station was established in 1978 under the call letters DXYX, airing a CHR/Top 40 format. On August 16, 1992, the station was relaunched as Smile Radio 102.3 and switched to a mass-based format. On November 23, 1999, it was rebranded as 1023 YXFM and switched back to its CHR/Top 40 format, with the slogan "Live It Up". On May 16, 2002, the station was relaunched once more 102.3 iFM, changed its call letters to DXIX, and brought back its mass-based format. In 2019, iFM began simulcasting some programs from its sister station DXIC.
