= DXNT =

Radio station in Misamis Occidental, Philippines

- Oroquieta; Philippines
- Broadcast area: Misamis Occidental
- Frequency: 96.5 MHz
- Branding: DXNT 96.5

Programming
- Languages: Filipino, Cebuano
- Format: Contemporary MOR, News, Talk

Ownership
- Owner: Kaissar Broadcasting Network

History
- First air date: October 15, 2012
- Call sign meaning: Natural

Technical information
- Licensing authority: NTC
- Power: 1 kW

DXNT (96.5 FM) is a radio station owned and operated by Kaissar Broadcasting Network. Its studios and transmitter are located at the 2nd Floor, Charm Bldg., JP Quijano St. cor. Pastrano St., Brgy. Poblacion, Oroquieta.
