= DXSR =

Radyo Sincero Valencia (DXSR)
- Valencia; Philippines
- Broadcast area: Bukidnon
- Frequency: 97.7 MHz
- Branding: 97.7 Radyo Sincero

Programming
- Languages: Cebuano, Filipino
- Format: Contemporary MOR, News, Talk
- Network: Radyo Sincero

Ownership
- Owner: Sarraga Integrated and Management Corporation
- Operator: ABJ Broadcasting Services

History
- First air date: 2018
- Former names: Power News FM (2018–2021); Win Radio (2021-2025)
- Call sign meaning: Sarraga

Technical information
- Licensing authority: NTC
- Power: 1 kW
- Repeaters: Impasugong: 107.5 MHz; Damulog: 95.1 MHz

97.7 Radyo Sincero (DXSR 97.7 MHz) is an FM station owned by Sarraga Integrated and Management Corporation (SIAM Corporation) and operated by ABJ Broadcasting Services. Its studios and transmitter are located at the 2nd Floor, Arlyn Bldg., Guinoyuran Rd., Brgy. Poblacion, Valencia, Bukidnon.

== History ==
The station first went on air in 2018 as Power News FM under the management of AR Broadcast Media. Back then, it was located in Purok 13, Brgy. Hagkol. Months later, it established its repeater (89.5 FM) in Malaybalay. It went off the air in late 2020. In April 2021, RSV Broadcast Services acquired the airtime of its former repeater, currently broadcasting as Juander Radyo (formerly Radyo Agong). In June, it returned on air as Win Radio under the management of ZimZam Management. On June 30, 2025, ABJ Broadcasting Services took over the station's operations, in which it became part of the Radyo Sincero network.
