= DXKR-AM =

Radio station in Koronadal City, South Cotabato, Philippines

RMN Koronadal (DXKR)
- Koronadal; Philippines
- Broadcast area: South Central Mindanao
- Frequency: 639 kHz
- Branding: DXKR RMN Koronadal

Programming
- Languages: Hiligaynon, Filipino
- Format: News, Public Affairs, Talk, Drama
- Network: Radyo Mo Nationwide

Ownership
- Owner: Radio Mindanao Network

History
- First air date: December 1, 1978
- Call sign meaning: Koronadal Radio

Technical information
- Licensing authority: NTC
- Class: A
- Power: 3,000 watts

Links
- Website: RMN Koronadal

DXKR (639 AM) RMN Koronadal is a radio station owned and operated by the Radio Mindanao Network. Its studio and transmitter are located along Gen. Santos Dr., Koronadal.
