= DXCC-AM =

Radio station in Cagayan de Oro, Philippines

RMN Cagayan de Oro (DXCC)
- Cagayan de Oro; Philippines
- Broadcast area: Misamis Oriental and surrounding areas
- Frequency: 828 kHz
- Branding: DXCC RMN Cagayan de Oro 828

Programming
- Languages: Cebuano, Filipino
- Format: News, Public Affairs, Talk, Drama
- Network: Radyo Mo Nationwide

Ownership
- Owner: Radio Mindanao Network
- Sister stations: 99.1 iFM News

History
- First air date: August 28, 1952
- Former frequencies: 1560 kHz (1952–1961); 780 kHz (1952–1978)
- Call sign meaning: Cagayan de Oro City; Canoi and Cui

Technical information
- Licensing authority: NTC
- Power: 10,000 watts

Links
- Website: RMN Cagayan de Oro

DXCC (828 AM) RMN Cagayan de Oro is a radio station owned and operated by the Radio Mindanao Network. It serves as the flagship station of RMN Networks. The station's studio is located at RMN Broadcast Center (Canoy Bldg.), Don Apolinario Velez St., Cagayan de Oro, and its transmitter is located at Brgy. Taboc, Opol.

Established on August 28, 1952, DXCC is the pioneer radio station in the city. The callsign was supposed to refer to the surnames of the business' founders (Canoy and Cui) but, according to Henry Canoy in his memoir, was actually referred as Cagayan de Oro City.

== History ==
DXCC first went on air on July 4, 1952 as a test broadcast, coinciding with the birthday of Henry Canoy's mother. At that time, it was situated on 1560 kHz. Its 500-watt transmitter was made from surplus parts from Raon in Quiapo, Manila, with only a telescopic steel pole borrowed from the Bureau of Telecom that served as antenna, which was mounted from the pole to a coconut tree 30 meters away.

It was officially launched on August 28, 1952, coinciding with the town fiesta of San Agustin. Its station ID was: “You are tuned to Station DXCC, broadcasting with a power of 500 watts on 1560 kilocycles from Cagayan de Oro's Gateway to Mindanao!”. The station's first live broadcast included the airing of the "Anejo Rum" from Plaza Divisoria in downtown Cagayan de Oro, for which Canoy billed La Tondena executive Hugo Chan Hong the sum of P500 as payment for the radio coverage.

At present, DXCC is among the top-rated AM stations in the market.
