= DYRI =

Radio station in Iloilo City, Philippines

RMN Iloilo (DYRI)
- Iloilo City; Philippines
- Broadcast area: Iloilo, Guimaras and surrounding areas
- Frequency: 774 kHz
- Branding: DYRI RMN Iloilo

Programming
- Languages: Hiligaynon, Filipino
- Format: News, Public Affairs, Talk, Drama
- Network: Radyo Mo Nationwide

Ownership
- Owner: Radio Mindanao Network
- Sister stations: 95.1 iFM

History
- First air date: 1960
- Former names: Ang Radyo Natin (1970s-1987); Radyo Agong (1987–1999)
- Former frequencies: 1280 kHz (1960–1978); 1107 kHz (1978–1996)
- Call sign meaning: RMN Iloilo

Technical information
- Licensing authority: NTC
- Class: B
- Power: 10,000 watts
- ERP: 20,000 watts

Links
- Webcast: Listen Live
- Website: RMN Iloilo

DYRI (774 AM) RMN Iloilo is a radio station owned and operated by the Radio Mindanao Network. Its studio is located at the St. Anne Bldg., Luna St., La Paz, Iloilo City, and its transmitter is located along Coastal Rd., Brgy. Hinactacan, La Paz, Iloilo City. It operates 24 hours a day. Established in 1960, DYRI is the pioneer station in the city.
