= Live radio =

Sound transmitted in real-time through radio waves

Live radio is radio broadcast without delay. Before the days of television, audiences listened to live dramas, comedies, quiz shows and concerts on the radio much the same way that they now do on television. Most talk radio is live radio where people can speak (anonymously) about their opinions and lives. Live radio is sound transmitted by radio waves, as the sound happens. Modern live radio is probably most used to broadcast sports but it is also used to transmit local news and traffic updates. Most radio that people listen to today is pre-recorded music, and the days of solely live broadcast music are generally not as present.

== Beginnings ==
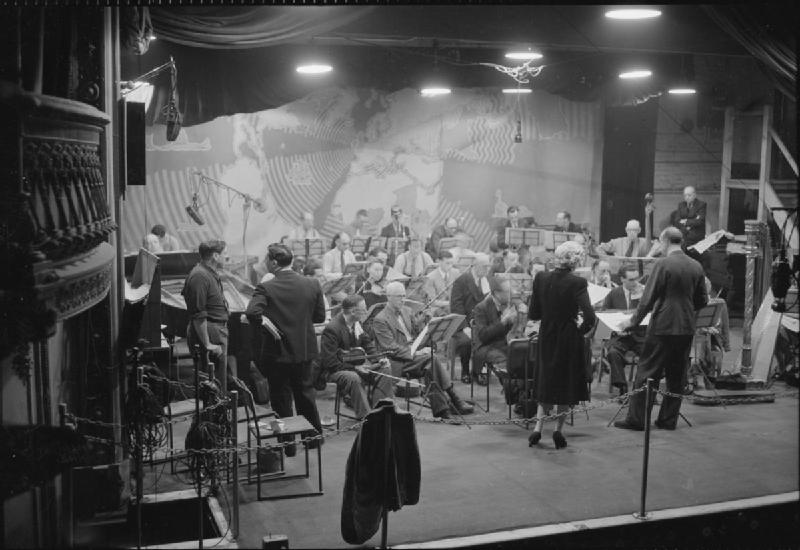
Live recording of the ITMA comedy radio show in England, 1945

According to Encyclopædia Britannica, the first transmission sent over radio waves were voice and music signals transmitted in December 1906 from Brant Rock, Massachusetts. Canadian experimenter Reginald Fessenden produced approximately an hour of talk and music that was heard by radio amateurs before radio's popularity exploded. Other experiments in radio before it became part of widespread culture were transmitted including those by Charles Herrold in San Jose, California in 1908.

Radio hobbyists continued to experiment, and popularity grew during the decade before World War I, a time before loudspeakers, where listeners would “listen in” with headphones. The first instrument used to access radio signals were crystal sets which used a tiny piece of galena (lead sulfide) called a “cat's whisker” to detect signals. The challenge with these sets were tuning into specific stations, though they were inexpensive and easy to make. These devices would likely have become more widespread, but in 1917 federal government placed restrictions on radio transmissions.

After the war, in the years 1920 to 1945 radio became the first electronic mass medium by using radio waves to broadcast to a vast audience. In its early years radio introduced the masses to immediate news and entertainment. In 1920–1921 about 30 radio stations took to the air, mostly developed from amateur operations. In 1921, the first live sporting event aired; it was a boxing match with play-by-play by reporter Florent Gibson. In 1922, over 550 new stations began to fill the available frequencies, although many disappeared because they couldn't afford the costs of operation. Radio stations had simplistic studios composed of walls covered in burlap for soundproofing, a microphone, and occasionally a piano to fill interludes. Everything on air was live, because in these early years recordings were such poor quality.

== Political integration ==
According to the United States House of Representatives archives, the United States Congress was slow to embrace radio technology. Up until the 1930s, radio reporters were denied recording access during congressional proceedings. The first attempt to transmit radio from the Capitol was in January 1921 during the inaugural address of President Warren G. Harding, though the attempt was unsuccessful. In 1922, President Harding successfully delivered an Annual Address that was broadcast via radio on the public address system and a house debate about tax-exempt securities became the first ever congressional proceeding to be broadcast. The resistance between Congress and radio broadcasting companies continued over the next couple of years. Broadcasters were banned, secretly planting microphones to listen in on proceedings, until March 1939, when more than 400 radio stations broadcast the 150th anniversary of the first session of Congress using microphones in the House Chamber. Finally, in September 1944, Representative John Coffee introduced H.J. Res. 311 which called for live radio broadcasts of all House proceedings. In this way, radio kept the nation informed and connected in the goings on in politics.

== Golden Age of Radio ==
The radio era, known as “the shortest golden age in history”, lasted from 1930 to 1955. Radio during the Golden Age began to fully develop programs with sound effects, music, dialogue, and narration. Some voice actors would play multiple characters in a story performed live on the air, and some radio shows were performed in front of a live audience. This allowed the show to gauge real audience reaction like applause and laughter for comedy shows. Programming during the Golden Age included comedies, dramas, westerns, horror and suspense shows, science fiction, soap operas, sports, and news.

== Big players ==
In the heyday of radio, NBC and CBS built their empire using the mass media and emphasising the value of live broadcasting. These companies and supporters of the "American system of broadcasting" defined radio as "commercial, national, live, and network on economic, technological, aesthetic and legislative levels." In 1929, NBC announced its pride and superiority among radio program companies, stating that live broadcast was superior to recorded programs. Live broadcast brought about a sense of spontaneity and immediacy, and in cases of live music intimacy as listeners hear the artist as they would live in concert. NBC asserted that the imperfections of live radio added to its authenticity and the pleasure of listening.

As popularity of radio grew, networks found that listeners preferred transcription programs recorded on discs more than locally produced live shows. The end of 1930 marked the beginning of the Golden Age of Radio, but also marked the end of many live broadcasting content. At this time, Variety estimated that 75% of radio stations used transcriptions. American electronics company RCA became a major manufacturer of transcriptions as live radio eventually dissipated, and even NBC who took pride in their live aesthetic caved to broadcasting sound from transcriptions.
