= Henry Canoy =

- Born: Henry Rabe Canoy; November 1, 1923; Cagayan de Oro, Philippine Islands
- Died: May 16, 2008 (aged 84); Cheyenne, Wyoming, USA
- Other name: Don Henry
- Occupations: businessman, broadcaster
- Known for: founder of Radio Mindanao Network
- Spouse: Maria Clara Suniel

Henry Rabe Canoy (November 1, 1923 – May 16, 2008) was a Filipino businessman and founder of Radio Mindanao Network.

Canoy was born in Cagayan de Oro, Misamis Oriental into a family of teachers and traders.

In 1952, Canoy started the DXCC, the first radio station in Cagayan de Oro. Canoy wanted to use radio for public broadcasting to inform, educate and also entertain listeners. Up until this time the main source of news for most Filipinos came from Manila based newspapers.
Canoy went on to open up many more local radio stations throughout the Philippines, together these stations formed the Radio Mindanao Network.

In 2002, Philippine President Gloria Macapagal Arroyo praised Canoy for his achievements in and contributions to broadcast journalism.
After Canoy's death President Arroyo released a statement praising his legacy,

Henry Canoy elevated local radio as exponents of rural progress and development. His legacy in the field of broadcast journalism goes beyond the airwaves of Radio Mindanao Network (RMN) and into the realm of genuine service to the country.

== Personal life ==
He was married to Maria Clara Suniel-Canoy. He has six children, respectively Eric, Rebecca, Ike aka "Butch", Charley, Tessa and Harriet.

His brother, Nestor Rabe Canoy (1927–2017), was a renowned radiation oncologist at the Ellis Fischel State Cancer Hospital in Columbia, Missouri and was in Private Practice as well, his youngest brother, Reuben Canoy served as Mayor of Cagayan de Oro and unsuccessfully ran for president in the 1986 Philippine presidential election.
