= DXVM-FM =

Radio station in Cagayan de Oro, Philippines

iFM Cagayan de Oro (DXVM)
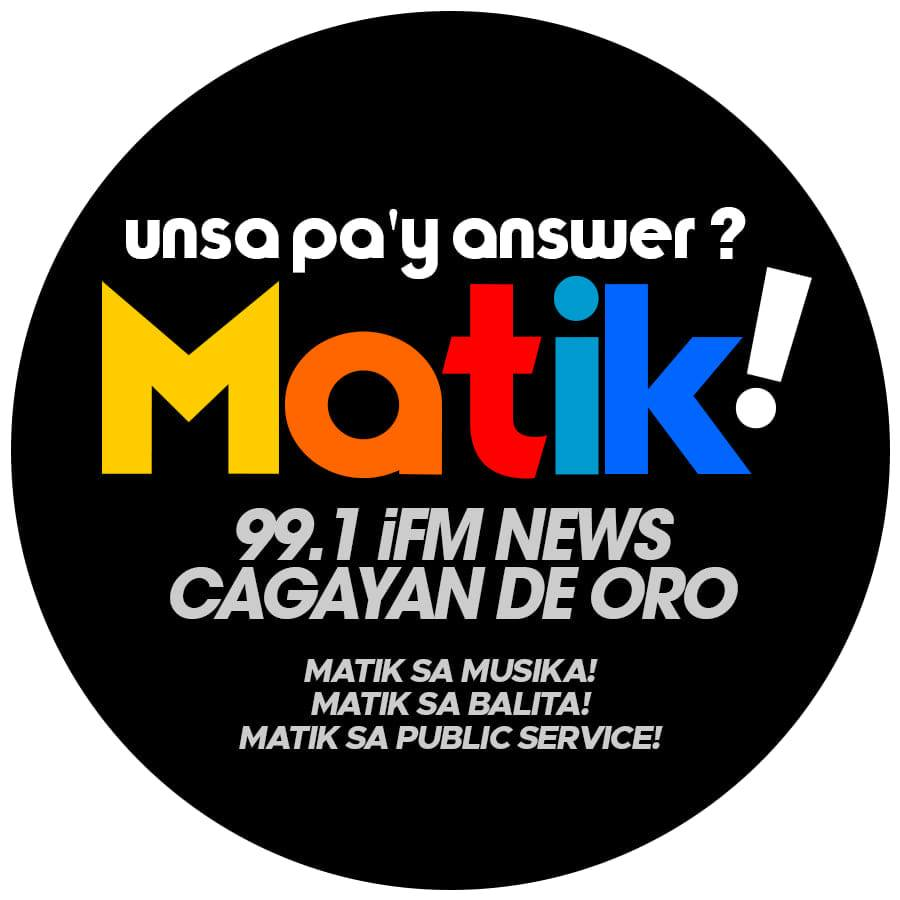
- Cagayan de Oro; Philippines
- Broadcast area: Misamis Oriental, parts of Lanao del Norte and Bukidnon
- Frequency: 99.1 MHz
- Branding: 99.1 iFM News

Programming
- Languages: Cebuano, Filipino
- Format: Contemporary MOR, OPM, News
- Network: iFM
- Affiliations: DZXL News 558 (for RMN Network News newscast)

Ownership
- Owner: Radio Mindanao Network
- Sister stations: DXCC RMN CDO

History
- First air date: 1952 (on AM); 1974 (on FM)
- Former frequencies: 870 kHz (1952–1974); 106.1 MHz (1974–1980s)
- Call sign meaning: Voice of Music

Technical information
- Licensing authority: NTC
- Class: B C D
- Power: 10,000 watts
- ERP: 30,000 watts

Links
- Website: iFM Cagayan de Oro

Former logo

DXVM (99.1 FM), broadcasting as 99.1 iFM News, is a radio station owned and operated by the Radio Mindanao Network. It serves as the flagship station of iFM. The station's studio is located at the RMN Broadcast Center (Canoy Bldg.), Don Apolinario Velez St. cor. Echem St., Cagayan de Oro, and its transmitter is located at Brgy. Barra, Opol. Established in 1974, DXVM is the pioneer FM station in the city.

== History ==
DXVM went on the air in 1952 as a soft launch. At that time, it was initially broadcast at 870 kHz.

In 1974, DXVM migrated into the FM band at 106.1 MHz, becoming the first RMN FM station. It was officially launched on November 1, 1976 as 106.1 VM-FM, carrying a Top 40 format. A few years later, DXVM-FM moved to its current frequency, 99.1 MHz.

On August 16, 1992, the station was relaunched as Smile Radio 99.1 with the slogan "The Voice of Music". It was one of few Smile Radio station with the same format, along with DYHT in Bacolod. On November 23, 1999, Smile Radio was rebranded as 991 VMFM (pronounced as "nine-nine-one") with its slogan "Live It Up!".

On May 16, 2002, the station was relaunched as 99.1 iFM and switched to a mass-based format, adopted its first slogan "Hit after hit, iFM".

On March 2, 2009, as part of RMN's nationwide expansion, iFM changed its logo as well as the slogan to "Sa iFM, Siguradong Enjoy Ka!", along with a new 7-note jingle. By late-2011, it launched a new slogan "Ambot sa Kambing na may Bangs!". Since then, iFM's official monicker is "Kakambing".

In 2024, it was rebranded as 99.1 iFM News along with some other iFM Mindanao stations.

After the shutdown of ABS-CBN's MOR, iFM took advantage and dominated the airwaves as the undisputed overall number 1 Radio Station in Cagayan de Oro, including social media platforms.
