= Radio Mindanao Network =

Philippine media company

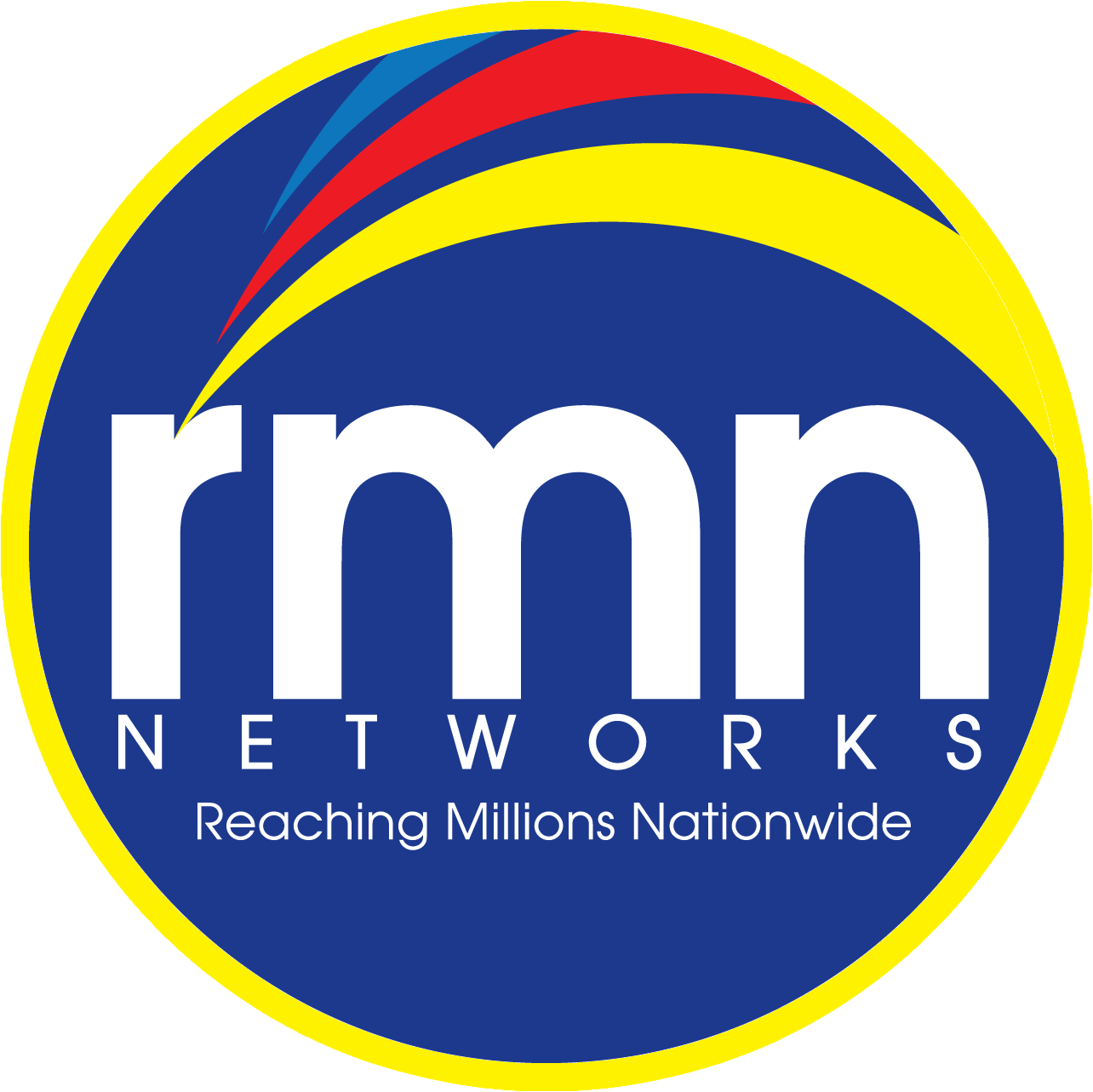
- Type: Private
- Industry: Mass media
- Founded: August 28, 1952 (radio network)
- Founder: Henry Canoy
- Headquarters: 4th Floor State Condominium I Bldg, Salcedo St., Legaspi Village, Makati, Philippines; RMN Broadcast Center (Canoy Bldg.), Don Apolinario Velez St., Cagayan de Oro, Philippines
- Area served: Worldwide (online)
- Key people: Eric S. Canoy (Chairman and President); Enrico Guido O. Canoy (EVP and Chief Operations Officer); Erika Marie Canoy-Sanchez (EVP and Chief Operating Officer, RMN Marketing and Media Ventures); Atty. Marietta E. Nieto (Corporate Secretary)
- Services: Broadcasting; Radio; Digital media
- Owner: EdCanoy Prime Holdings
- Parent: EdCanoy Prime Holdings
- Website: thermnnetworks.ph rmn.ph

Radyo Mo Nationwide
- Type: Broadcast AM radio network, (News, Public Affairs, Talk, Drama)
- Country: Philippines
- Availability: Nationwide
- Motto: Tatak RMN!

iFM
- Type: Broadcast FM radio network (Contemporary MOR, OPM)
- Country: Philippines
- Availability: Nationwide
- Founded: May 16, 2002
- Motto: (varies per station location)

Radio Mindanao Network, Inc. (RMN), d.b.a. RMN Networks, is a Filipino media company and national radio network based in Makati, Philippines. Its corporate office is located at the 4th Floor State Condominium I Bldg, Salcedo St., Legaspi Village, Makati, and its main headquarters are located at the RMN Broadcast Center (Canoy Bldg.), Don Apolinario Velez St., Cagayan de Oro.

The network's first radio station was DXCC (which also serves as the network's flagship station) established in Cagayan de Oro in Mindanao on August 28, 1952. The callsign has been supposed as a reference to the surnames of the business' founders (Canoy and Cui) but, according to founder Henry Canoy in his memoir, was actually chosen to mean Cagayan de Oro City.

== History ==
Sometime in 1948, Henry Canoy, together with Robin Cui and Vicente Rivera, set up two home-built tube radio receivers bought from Fideng Palacio of Puntod and placed them in an abandoned chicken poultry house situated at the corner of Velez and del Pilar streets in Cagayan de Oro for the purpose of listening to radio broadcasts from Manila. Canoy and friends ended up listening to radio broadcasts at night when reception was better. Eventually, the friends were all convinced to build a radio transmitter of their own. The group managed to assemble a 30-Watt radio transmitter from surplus parts bought at Raon Street in Quiapo, Manila. Canoy broke the airwaves as a pirate radio station in 1949, declaring "This is Cagayan de Oro calling...". Because the broadcast was not authorized by the Radio Control Office (RCO), it did not contain call letters.

In 1950 Canoy, at the insistence of his brother, lawyer Reuben Canoy, decided to establish a more powerful radio station and applied for a congressional franchise in Manila to support its lawful operation. In 1951, he set up the fledgling station in partnership with Robin Cui, Max Suniel, Oscar Neri and Andres Bacal as equity partners with P10,000 in capital. on June 23, 1952, he was granted a permit to maintain and operate the radio broadcasting station.

Using the Radio Amateur's Handbook as their guide and also with surplus parts bought from Raon Street in Quiapo, they built their own 500-watt AM transmitter with the assistance from Far East Broadcasting Company engineers, American Dick Rowland and Byrd Bruneimer. The transmitter was transported to Mindanao aboard the boat MV Snug Hitch. With only a telescopic steel pole as antenna borrowed from the Bureau of Telecom, the improvised horizontal radio antenna was mounted by the team which include Ongkoy Padero, former vice president for engineering of CEPALCO, attaching one end of a copper wire to the pole and the other end to a 30 meter coconut tree a block away. While their first “transmitter building” was financed with a P5,000 “duck farm” loan from the Philippine National Bank. The RCO headed by Jose Viado, assigned the station a broadcast frequency of 1560 kHz.

On July 4, 1952 the radio station finally went on air for a test broadcast, coinciding with the birthday of his mother. It officially started broadcasting on August 28, 1952, also coinciding with the town festival of San Agustin, the patron saint of Cagayan de Oro. Listeners anticipated the first words they would hear on radio and were greeted the station ID and the following words: “You are tuned to Station DXCC, broadcasting with a power of 500 watts on 1560 kilocycles from Cagayan de Oro's Gateway to Mindanao!” and every hour thereafter. The station's first live broadcast coincided with its opening and the program involved the airing of a three-hour “Anejo Rum” show from Plaza Divisoria, a central park in downtown Cagayan de Oro, for which Canoy billed La Tondena executive Hugo Chan Hong the sum of P500 as payment for the radio coverage. The radio signal was able to reach Del Monte Pacific plantation in Bukidnon 30 kilometres (19 mi) away and as far as Australia through ham radio operations which managed to call back. (RMN The Henry R. Canoy Story, ISBN ?, Copyright 1997)

In 1954, Henry Canoy visited the United States under an observation grant. Instead of going to the giant networks and other big cities, he opted to be taken to a small town of Greeley, Colorado, and he came upon a station that was doing exactly what DXCC was already trying to do in Mindanao. Its broadcast fare was peppered with farm prices, market and road conditions, weather warnings and personal messages. He came back with the blueprint for DXCC, which is entertainment, information and most of all education to the public.

The success of its broadcasting concept enabled DXCC to expand broadcast areas in 1953 stations to Iligan (DXIC), then to Butuan (DXBC) and Davao City (DXDC) in 1957. And so the string of community stations became Radio Mindanao Network (RMN).

In 1961, RMN's approach to broadcasting drew the interest of another business leader, Andres Soriano Sr. of San Miguel Corporation who eventually bought the majority shares of RMN and brought the radio network to Manila, the first provincial station to do so. "The Sound of the City" concept was born with the establishment of DZHP in the Greater Manila Area. Its format was strictly music and news. RMN joined forces with the Philippine Herald and Inter-Island Broadcasting Corporation to form the powerful first tri-media organization. That association gave RMN at the forefront of broadcast journalism and public service. Other "Sound of the City" stations soon followed in Zamboanga City in 1961 (DXRZ), Cebu in 1962 (DYHP), Metro Manila (DWXL) (now DZXL) and Iloilo in 1963 (DYRI), Bacolod in 1964 (DYHB), Tagbilaran in 1967 (DYXT), Baguio (DZHB) and Bislig, Surigao del Sur in 1968 (DXHP).

In 1968, RMN became the first Filipino radio station to transmit national newscasts via microwave, which was relayed through stations DZHP in Manila, DZHB in Baguio, DYHP in Cebu, DXCC in Cagayan de Oro and DXDC in Davao City.

From 1969 to 1970 three more community stations emerged - DXRS in Surigao City, DZHN in Naga, Camarines Sur and in 1971 DXMY in Cotabato City. In early 1972, station DYCC in Calbayog. By 1972, RMN had fifteen AM stations under its wings.

In 1973, with a constitutional limitation prohibiting the ownership of media by non-Filipinos or corporations not 100% Filipino owned, Henry Canoy's group brought out the Soriano-San Miguel group holdings in RMN.

In 1975, the call letters of the Manila flagship station, DZHP was changed to DWXL. Together with this, English programming gave way to Tagalog. RMN's AM stations were broadcasting in three major languages: Tagalog, Cebuano and Ilonggo. Columnist Teodoro Valencia joined RMN as its chairman of the board. Under his guidance RMN was able to secure a loan from the Development Bank of the Philippines to finance its massive expansion and development program. A Cebuano drama production center based in DYHP-Cebu was established and subsequently followed by an Ilonggo drama production center based in DYHB-Bacolod.

In 1978, RMN's major expansion program was launched which include the upgrading of the technical facilities of its existing stations and the establishment of additional AM and FM stations. Among the stations that were added to the roster of RMN stations were: DXMD in General Santos, DWHP-FM in Laoag, DYRR in Ormoc, DXWR-FM in Zamboanga City, DXIX-FM in Iligan, DYXY-FM in Tacloban, DYRS-FM in San Carlos, Negros Occidental, DXVM-FM in Cagayan de Oro, DXMB-AM in Malaybalay, DXXL-FM in Davao City, DYXL-FM in Cebu, DWKC-FM in Metro Manila and DXKR-AM in Koronadal, DYKR-AM in Kalibo in 1979. DWHB-FM in Baguio, DWON in Dagupan and DYVR-AM in Roxas, Capiz opened in 1980. DXDR-AM in Dipolog and DXPR in Pagadian was added on January 10, 1980, DXXX-FM in Butuan in 1985, DYVR-FM in Roxas, Capiz in 1986 and DYIC-FM in Iloilo City in 1987.

RMN also increased its coverage by entering into tie-up arrangements with smaller networks. Under this scheme, RMN provided programming, marketing, technical and management expertise where these small stations would be found wanting. This gave birth to a new name for these stations under the RMN umbrella - Radio Mindanao Network, Inc. and Associates.

In 1985, the programming of all RMN FM stations were also re-oriented to cater to a younger pop music audience. To give more emphasis to the emerging FM station market, RMN also divided its operations into two Operating Divisions, AM and FM. During the early 90s, DYHP in Cebu was also aired their programs via satellite thru the stations DYHD in Tagbilaran, DYRR in Ormoc, DYWC in Dumaguete, DYRS in San Carlos, DXDR in Dipolog and DXRS in Surigao.

In 1990, RMN undertook another major expansion program which entailed the addition of seven FM radio stations. A permit for RMN's first TV station located in Cagayan de Oro was also granted.

On April 18, 1991, President Corazon Aquino signed into law Republic Act 6980 entitled "An Act Renewing the Franchise Granted to Radio Mindanao Network, Inc. under Republic Act Numbered Thirty-One Hundred Twenty-Two to another Twenty-Five (25) years from the date of approval of this Act". This was the first broadcast franchise approved under Aquino's presidency.

On August 28, 1991, TV-8, RMN's first television station went on the air in Cagayan de Oro. RMN-TV 8 was then an affiliate of the then newly established Associated Broadcasting Company from 1992 to 1995. Thirty nine years after its start, RMN was now venturing into television. In December 1991, RMN was also granted a permit to operate a UHF television station in Metro Manila (which was led to officially started two years later, on October 31, 1993; the frequency was now used by Broadcast Enterprises and Affiliated Media, Inc. (through Globe Telecom's then-subsidiary Altimax Broadcasting Company).

In 1998, it went global by establishing the first Philippine radio station to conquer the United States airwaves through WRMN in New York City.

In June 2007, RMN FM station DWKC 93.9 in Manila was the first commercial station in the country to broadcast with HD Radio technology. It broadcast in three HD Radio digital audio channels along with its pre-existing analog signal. The operation of its facility was in high-level combined hybrid mode with an existing 35 kW analog transmitter, a new Nautel 1 kW HD Radio transmitter, with the digital exciter, importer and exporter providing the digital signal component.

=== Television ===
With the acquisition of Radio Mindanao Network by Andrés Soriano in 1962, RMN and IBC formed the first tri-media organization in the Philippines along with newspaper, The Philippines Herald. As the television arm of the RMN, IBC partnered with the RMN radio stations for coverages of the general elections of 1969 and 1971.

On February 1, 1975, during the martial law era, due to the constitutional limitation prohibiting the ownership of media by non-Filipinos or corporations not 100% Filipino owned, IBC was sold to Roberto Benedicto, who also owned Kanlaon Broadcasting System (now Radio Philippines Network) and the corporate name of IBC was changed to Intercontinental Broadcasting Corporation. IBC was later sequestered by the government after the EDSA Revolution in 1986.

On October 31, 1993, Radio Mindanao Network became the second radio-based network to launch a TV network called Cinema Television (CTV) through its flagship station, DWKC-TV and other regional stations. An all-movie channel, its programming included a presentation of Filipino and Hollywood movies respectively, and programs from E!, an American cable channel. It was the first UHF stations to be inspired by the format of a cable movie channel. It once clinched a top spot for its TV ratings in all UHF stations in Manila.

However, because of the broadcasting rules assigned by National Telecommunications Commission and the manner in which it acquired the broadcast rights from E!, CTV stopped its broadcast in September 2000.

In October 2000, E! and RMN announced its partnership to relaunch CTV into E! Philippines, with its broadcasting extended into 24 hours. But in 2003, it reduced its broadcasts into 6 primetime and late-night hours, from 6:00 PM to 2:30 AM. Some of E!'s programs were brought to the Philippines and remade in a local version, one of which was Wild On! Philippines. On June 1, 2003, RMN ceased operations on TV due to financial constraints and poor television ratings, and focused instead on their two radio networks (RMN and iFM). There were several religious groups who had wished to acquire block programming of E! Philippines, but RMN refused to accept their offers.

DWKC-TV and other regional stations were soon acquired by Broadcast Enterprises and Affiliated Media (then under the Canoys until it was sold to the Globe Group in 2009) and resumed its operations in 2011.

In March 2016, president and chairman of RMN, Eric S. Canoy announced its intention to bid for the acquisition of the government-sequestered TV network IBC, as part of the government's efforts to privatize the network.

On May 18, 2016, President Benigno Aquino III signed Republic Act No. 10818, renewing the franchise granted to the Radio Mindanao Network, Inc. for another twenty-five (25) years on a term that shall take effect on April 18, 2016.

== Programming ==
RMN broadcasts a number of national programs either through a localized version or via satellite from the network's main studios in San Juan. Its flagship rolling newscast, RMN Network News, has morning and noontime editions every Monday through Saturday and a late-afternoon edition on weekdays, and is simulcast on RMN-owned and/or affiliated stations in the Philippines.

Only a handful of nationally branded programs like Unang Radyo, Unang Balita, Straight to the Point and Sentro Serbisyo/Centro Serbisyo are broadcast in their respective local versions with different hosts and in different dialects.

== Stations ==
The following is a list of radio stations owned and affiliated by RMN.

=== RMN ===
==== Luzon ====
Branding	Callsign	Frequency	Location
DZXL News	DZXL	558 kHz	Mega Manila
RMN Naga	DWNX	91.1 MHz	Naga
RMN Naga	DWNX	1296 kHz	Naga

==== Visayas ====
Branding	Callsign	Frequency	Location
RMN Bacolod	DYHB	747 kHz	Bacolod
RMN Iloilo	DYRI	774 kHz	Iloilo City
RMN Kalibo	DYKR	1161 kHz	Kalibo
RMN Roxas	DYVR	657 kHz	Roxas
RMN Cebu	DYHP	612 kHz	Cebu City
iFM RMN Tacloban	DYXY	99.1 MHz	Tacloban

==== Mindanao ====
Branding	Callsign	Frequency	Location
RMN Cagayan de Oro	DXCC	828 kHz	Cagayan de Oro
RMN Surigao	DXRS	918 kHz	Surigao City
RMN Butuan	DXBC	693 kHz	Butuan
RMN Davao	DXDC	621 kHz	Davao City
RMN Gensan	DXMD	927 kHz	General Santos
RMN Koronadal	DXKR	639 kHz	Koronadal
RMN Iligan	DXIC	711 kHz	Iligan
RMN Malaybalay	DXMB	648 kHz	Malaybalay
RMN Dipolog	DXDR	981 kHz	Dipolog
RMN Dipolog	DXDR	94.1 MHz	Dipolog
iFM RMN Cotabato	DXMY	90.9 MHz	Cotabato City
RMN Pagadian	DXPR	603 kHz	Pagadian
RMN Zamboanga	DXRZ	900 kHz	Zamboanga City

=== iFM ===
==== Luzon ====
Branding	Callsign	Frequency	Location
iFM Manila	DWKC	93.9 MHz	Mega Manila
iFM Laoag	DWHP	99.5 MHz	Laoag
iFM Vigan	DWHK	105.3 MHz	Vigan
iFM Baguio	DWHB	103.9 MHz	Baguio
iFM Dagupan	DWON	104.7 MHz	Dagupan
iFM Cauayan	DWKD	98.5 MHz	Cauayan
iFM Lucena	DWHU	106.3 MHz	Lucena

==== Visayas ====
Branding	Callsign	Frequency	Location
iFM Bacolod	DYHT	94.3 MHz	Bacolod
iFM Iloilo	DYIC	95.1 MHz	Iloilo City
iFM Boracay	DYBS	98.1 MHz	Boracay
iFM Roxas	DYVR	93.9 MHz	Roxas
iFM Cebu	DYXL	93.9 MHz	Cebu City

==== Mindanao ====
Branding	Callsign	Frequency	Location
iFM Cagayan de Oro	DXVM	99.1 MHz	Cagayan de Oro
iFM Surigao	DXKE	94.1 MHz	Surigao City
iFM Butuan	DXXX	100.7 MHz	Butuan
iFM Iligan	DXIX	102.3 MHz	Iligan
iFM Valencia	DXAR	95.3 MHz	Valencia
iFM Davao	DXXL	93.9 MHz	Davao City
iFM Gensan	DXCK	91.9 MHz	General Santos
iFM Pagadian	DXWD	96.7 MHz	Pagadian
iFM Zamboanga	DXWR	96.3 MHz	Zamboanga City

=== Affiliate Stations ===
==== Luzon ====
Branding	Callsign	Frequency	Location	Owner
DWWW	DWWW	774 kHz	Mega Manila	Interactive Broadcast Media
DWWW	DWHT	107.9 MHz	Dagupan	Broadcast Enterprises and Affiliated Media
Commando Radio	DWRS	927 kHz	Vigan	Solid North Broadcasting
Radyo Totoo Baguio	DZWT	540 kHz	Baguio	Mountain Province Broadcasting Corp. (Also affiliated with the Catholic Media Network)
Radyo Pilipino Dagupan	DWPR	1296 kHz	Dagupan	Radyo Pilipino Corporation
Radyo Pilipino Lucena	DZLT	1188 kHz	Lucena	Radyo Pilipino Corporation
One FM Lucena	DZLQ	98.3 MHz	Lucena	Radyo Pilipino Corporation
Radyo Tirad Pass	DZTP	693 kHz	Candon	Tirad Pass Radio and TV Broadcasting Network
DZCV	DZCV	684 kHz	Tuguegarao	Filipinas Broadcasting Network
DWDY	DWDY	1107 kHz	Cauayan, Isabela	Northeastern Broadcasting Service
DWND	DWND	88.5 MHz	Cauayan, Isabela	Northeastern Broadcasting Service
Power Radio	DWSR	94.1 MHz	Daet	Caceres Broadcasting Corporation
Wow Smile Radio	DWAW	99.9 MHz	Sorsogon City	Wow Smile Media Services
Wow Smile Radio	DWAO	95.3 MHz	Bulan, Sorsogon	Wow Smile Media Services
Wow Smile Radio	DWAX	92.9 MHz	Pilar, Sorsogon	Wow Smile Media Services
Radyo Masbate	DYME	783 kHz	Masbate City	Masbate Community Broadcasting Company

==== Visayas ====
Branding	Callsign	Frequency	Location	Owner
Power 91	DYGB	91.7 MHz	Dumaguete	Gold Label Broadcasting System, Inc.
Radyo Bandilyo	DYWC	801 kHz	Dumaguete	Franciscan Broadcasting Corporation (Also affiliated with the Catholic Media Network)
DYTR	DYTR	1116 kHz	Tagbilaran	Tagbilaran Broadcasting System
Balita FM	DYTR	91.1 MHz	Tagbilaran	Tagbilaran Broadcasting System

==== Mindanao ====
Branding	Callsign	Frequency	Location	Owner
Radyo Pilipino Ozamiz	DXOC	1494 kHz	Ozamiz	Radyo Pilipino Corporation

=== WRMN New York ===
WRMN New York
- Nutley, New Jersey, United States; Philippines
- Broadcast area: Worldwide via internet

Programming
- Format: News, Talk

Ownership
- Owner: Radio Mindanao Network; (Radio Pinoy USA)

History
- First air date: 1998

Links
- Webcast: Listen Live
- Website: radiopinoyusa.com

WRMN New York is RMN's own internet radio station. Based in Nutley, New Jersey, it also serves the Filipino-American community in the New York City area.

== Chronology of radio stations in Mindanao ==
The pioneer radio broadcasting station in Mindanao was DXMC-AM founded in 1949 and owned by Guillermo Torres of the University of Mindanao in Davao City. It later became UM Broadcasting Network. DXMC-AM is now the present-day DXWT-FM, which was converted into the FM band since 1988. The second, DXAW, was established by Alfred James Wills, a retired US Army Signal Corps officer (The DXAW calls were used by the TV station in Davao (which is now known as DXAK-TV Channel 4 or ALLTV4 Davao) owned by ABS-CBN Corporation from 1967 to 1972.) There were four others that operated in Butuan, Surigao, Pagadian and Ozamiz. DXCC-AM is the 7th legally operating radio station having been founded in 1952.

== See also ==
- UM Broadcasting Network
- Broadcast Enterprises and Affiliated Media
- Intercontinental Broadcasting Corporation
