= List of programs broadcast by Presidential Broadcast Service =

These are the list of programs produced and/or distributed by the Presidential Broadcast Service thru its radio networks: Radyo Pilipinas - Radyo Publiko, Radyo Pilipinas - Sports Radio, Radyo Pilipinas - Radyo Magasin, Radyo Pilipinas World Service, Republika ni Juan and The Capital.

== Radyo Pilipinas - Radyo Publiko ==
Note: Not all programs that are broadcast nationwide via satellite from its Manila station, as most of its provincial stations may opt-out from its national simulcast in favor of their respective local/regional programming.

- #PBBMWeek (2025–present, online-only and can be watched on GMA every Sunday evening)
- Alagang AMOSUP (2025–present, from Radyo Pilipinas World Service)
- Alerto Siete-Tres-Otso (2026–present)
- Bangon, Bayang Mahal! (2022, 2023–present)
- Bagong Umaga, Bagong Pag-asa (2017–present)
- Bagong Pilipinas Ngayon (2025–present, simulcast on PTV)
- Boses (2025–present)
- Celebrating Life (2020–present)
- Census Serbilis (2016–present)
- Doctor On Board (2018–present)
- DHSUD’s Kapihan sa Radyo (2020, 2025–present)
- Go Agri (2022–present)
- Hukbong Dagat ng Pilipinas (2025–present)
- Impormasyon at Aksyon sa Bagong Pilipinas (2024–present)
- Juan Trabaho (2025–present)
- Kalinga Hatid ng Red Cross (2017–present)
- KKK sa Pananalapi (2026–present)
- Leslie Bocobo Live (2024–present, hookup from PTV)
- Mabuhay Pilipinas (2017–present)
- Malacañang Press Briefing (as Radyo Pilipinas Straight from Malacañang) (1990–present, hookup from PTV)
- Mark In, Mark Out (2022–present)
- Media Ngayon (2025–present)
- Meet the Press On Air (2017–present)
- Makikiraan Lang Po (2026–present)
- Oras Para sa Musika (music block) (2023–present)
- Pinas Sabat (2025–present)
- Pulso ng Pilipino (2023–present)
- PTV News Mindanao
- Radyo Pilipinas Live (2022–24, 2025–present)
- Radyo Pilipinas News Nationwide (2017–present)
  - Radyo Pilipinas News Nationwide @ 6 am (2024–present)
  - Radyo Pilipinas News Nationwide @ 11 am (2024–present)
  - Radyo Pilipinas News Nationwide Saturday @ 6 am (2025–present)
- Radyo Pilipinas News Update (2023–present, hourly news update)
- Radyo Pilipinas Presidential Live Event (2022–present, live/special coverages of the President)
- Radyo Pilipinas Special Coverage (2017–present, live/special coverages)
- Radyo Publiko-Serbisyo (2025–present, also simulcast on PTV)
- Radyo Siyensya (2024–present)
- Read Pinoy (2023–24, as a standalone program, 2025–present, as a replay from Radyo Magasin)
- Ronda Pilipinas (2017–present)
- Sports Radio sa Radyo Pilipinas (2026–present)
  - Fight News Weekly (2023–24,2026–present)
  - Post Game (2026–present)
- Salaam Radio (2017–present)
- Serbisyong Coast Guard (2026–present)
- The AI Talks with The Voice Master (2025–present)
- The Big 5 (2025–present)
- TikTalk ng Bayan (2024–present)
- Tinig ng Kababaihan (2023–24, as a standalone program, 2025–present, as a replay from Radyo Magasin)
- Tahanan ng OFW (2025–present)
- Ulat Bayan (2017–23, 2025–present, hookup from PTV)
  - Ulat Bayan Weekend (2020–present, hookup from PTV)
- Usapang Agrikultura (2024–present)
- Usapang Budget Natin (2024–present)
- Usaping Legal (2023–present)
- Vloggers ng Bagong Pilipinas (2025–present)
- Karuanngan A Damag (2026-Present)
- PTV News Mindanao (2026-Present)

== Sports Radio ==
- Chess and Billiards On Air (2022–present)
- Cycle Lane (2022–present)
- Campus Sports (2026–present)
- Dancesport Pilipinas (2022–present)
- Fight News Weekly (2022–present)
- Football Connection (2017–18, 2019–present)
- Floorball on Focus (2023–present)
- Game On: Isyu at Balita (2017–present)
- Going Places (2023–present)
- Esports Explorer (2024–present)
- Headline Sports (2022–present)
- Hoop Talk (2009–2017,2022–present)
- Isport Lang! (2018–present)
- In & Out The Zone (2026–present)
- Isports Radyo Magasin (2022–present)
- Kiddie Sports (2024–present)
- LGU Sports Corner (2022–present)
- Motorsports Paddock (2019–present)
- Music automation (music block) (2017–20, 2022–present)
- NBA Jam (2026–present)
- Para-Games Hour (2022–present)
- PBA Games on Sports Radio (1983–89, 2002–09, 2011–14, 2023–present, simulcast also on selected RP1 stations)
- Post Game (2017–present)
- Press Start Pilipinas (2022–present)
- PSA Forum (2022–present)
- PSC Hour (2019–22, 2023–present)
- Radyo Pilipinas sa Sports Radio (2017–present)
  - Bagong Pilipinas Ngayon (2025–present, hookup from Radyo Pilipinas and PTV)
  - Boses (2025–present)
  - Celebrating Life (2017–20, under Sports Radio, 2020–present, as a simulcast under Radyo Pilipinas)
  - Mabuhay Pilipinas (2017–20, 2022–23, 2024–present)
  - Radyo Pilipinas News Nationwide (2017–18, 2022–present)
  - Usapang Agrikultura (2025–present)
- Sports Radio Headlines Ngayon (2017–2020, 2022–present, hourly news update)
- Spiker's Net (2022–present)
- Sports 918 (2017–present)
- Sports and Science (2018–present)
- Sports Calendar for the Week (2022–present)
- Sports Lockdown (2022–present)
- Sports News Roundup (1990s–present)
- Sports Update (2024–present)
- Sports Stars of Yesteryears (2022–present)
- Talk NBA (2017–present)
- Top Sports Stories of the Week (2022–present)
- Ulat Bayan Weekend (2022–present, hookup from PTV)

== Radyo Magasin ==
- Bagong Immigration (2025–present)
- Batang Brodkaster (2025–present)
- Home EcoNanay (2024–25, as a RP1 simulcast, 2025–present, as a standalone program)
- Iskultura (2023–present)
- Kundiman Atbp. (2024–present)
- Kuwentuhang Green Mindset (2025–present)
- Makabata TeleRadyo (2024–present, produced by the Council for the Welfare of Children)
- Mind Matters: Conversations on Mental Health (2025–present, produced by Philippine Psychiatric Association)
- Musikerong Pinoy (music block) (2023–present)
- Musta Ka Mare? (2017–20, 2023–present)
- Pasyal Pinas (2025–present)
- Pinoy Lodi (2025–present)
- PopBeat: Populasyon ang Puso ng Pag-unlad (2025–present)
- Radyo Pilipinas sa Radyo Magasin (2023–present)
  - Bagong Pilipinas Ngayon (2025–present)
  - Boses (2025–present)
  - Leslie Bocobo Live (2024–25, 2026–present)
  - Radyo Pilipinas News Nationwide (2023–present)
  - Ronda Pilipinas (2024, 2026–present)
- Rainbow Radyo (2025–present)
- Read Pinoy (2025–present)
- School on the Air (2025–present)
- Sports News Roundup (2025–present, hookup from RP2)
- Tinig ng Kababaihan (2024–25, as a RP1 simulcast, 2025–present, as a standalone program)

== Radyo Pilipinas World Service ==
=== Filipino Service ===
- Alagang AMOSUP
- Ang Pilipinas Ngayon
- Babangon sa Makabagong Serbisyo Publiko
- Bangon, Bayang Mahal! (2026–present, replay from Radyo Pilipinas - Radyo Publiko)
- Bridges On Air
- Global Na Tayo
- Serbisyong CFO sa Bagong Pilipinas
- Usap-Usapan
- Warm Heart

=== English Service ===
- Dateline Malacañang
- DFA Online
- Front and Center
- World News in Five

=== Streaming-only ===
- Radyo Pilipinas hookup
- Tunog Pinoy

== Republika ni Juan ==
- Juan Balita (hourly news bulletin)
- Music blocks (2025–present)
  - Kalye ni Juan
  - Juanderful Morning
  - Juanderful Tonight
  - Juan Republic
  - Juan To Three
  - Pop Goes the World
  - Time Machine
  - Weekend Republic
    - Indak
    - 90s Steer

== Capital ==
- Bagong Pilipinas Ngayon (2026–present, hookup from Radyo Pilipinas and PTV)
- News You Can Use (hourly news bulletin)
- Radyo Pilipinas sa Capital (2025–present)
  - Bangon, Bayang Mahal! (2025–present)
  - Boses (2025–present)
  - Celebrating Life (2026–present)
  - Juan Trabaho (2026–present)
  - Leslie Bocobo Live (2026–present, hookup from PTV)
  - Malacañang Press Briefing (as Radyo Pilipinas Straight from Malacañang) (2026–present, hookup from PTV)
  - Mark In, Mark Out (2026–present)
  - Radyo Publiko-Serbisyo (2025–present, hookup from Radyo Pilipinas and PTV)
  - Radyo Pilipinas News Nationwide (2025–present)
  - Radyo Pilipinas Presidential Live Event (2025–present, live/special coverages of the President)
  - Radyo Pilipinas Special Coverage (2025–present, live/special coverages)
  - Ronda Pilipinas (2026–present)
  - Fight News Weekly (2026–present)
  - Post Game (2026–present)
  - Usapang Budget Natin (2026–present)
- Sports Radio sa Capital (2026–present)
  - Hoop Talk (2026–present)
  - NBA Jam (2026–present)
  - Press Start Pilipinas (2026–present)
  - Sports Calendar for the Week (2026–present)
  - Sports News Roundup (2026–present)
  - Top Sports Stories of the Week (2026–present)
- Radyo Magasin sa Capital (2026–present)
  - Bagong Immigration (2026–present)
  - Golden Heart (2026–present)
  - Home EcoNanay (2026–present)
  - PopBeat: Populasyon ang Puso ng Pag-unlad (2026–present)
  - Read Pinoy (2026–present)
  - Tara Na! (2026–present)
  - Tinig ng Kababaihan (2026–present)
- Radyo Pilipinas World Service sa Capital (2026–present)
  - Ang Pilipinas Ngayon (2026–present)
  - Dateline Malacañang (2026–present)
  - DFA Online (2026–present)
  - Front and Center (2026–present)
  - World News in Five (2026–present)
- The Advocates with Rochelle Rubio (2025–present)
- Gets Na with Papa Quincy (2026–present)
- Negoshow with Joe Fernandez (2026–present)
- Ulat Bayan (2026–present, hookup from PTV)
- Ulat Bayan Weekend (2026–present, hookup from PTV)

== Previously aired programming ==
=== Radyo ng Bayan/Radyo Pilipinas One ===
- #LagingHanda, #COVID19PH Radio: The Radyo Pilipinas Special Coverage (2020–22)
- #MagsasakaonRadio (2020)
- #MahiyaNamanKayo: The Radyo Pilipinas Special Coverage (September 21, 2025)
- ABAKADA: Daan ng Buhay
- Ang Inyong Armed Forces (2017–20, 2020–23)
- Ang Maestro Atbp. (2017–20, 2021–22)
- Agenda ng Bayan (2016–24)
- AT: Adulting in Tandem (2023–24)
- Ating Alamin (2017)
- Atraksyon Integrasyon
- Bale Todo (2016–18)
- Balik Probinsya, Bagong Pag-asa Program (2022)
- Balita at Panayam
- Balitang Pambansa (2024–25, simulcast on PTV, IBC, RP2/Sports Radio, RP3/Radyo Magasin, Republika FM1/Republika ni Juan, Capital FM2/The Capital, PIA and PNA)
- Balitaan at Kuwentuhan
- Balitang Bayan Alas 5ingko (2025–2026)
- Bantay Kalsada (2017–2020, 2020–2023)
- Barangay 4 (2020, simulcast on PTV)
- Barangay PBS
- Bayan at Kongreso
- Bayani ng Lahi
- Beautiful Sunday
- Better Call Sel (2017–18)
- Birada Bendijo (2020)
- Bitag Live (2017–22)
- Biyaheng Bukid (2017–18)
- DOLE At Your Service sa Bagong Pilipinas (2025)
- DOTR Sakay NA (2025)
- Buklod Bayan
- Cabinet Report sa TeleRadyo (2018–22)
- Census Serbilis sa Radyo (2017–23)
- CRI Filipino Service (2017–20)
  - Wow China
  - Dito Lang Yan sa Tsina
  - Kape't Tsaa
- CORDS X Podcast
- Counterpoint with Sec. Sal Panelo (2020, hookup from Radio-Television Malacanañg)
- DA Presser (2020)
- Daang Walang Hanggan
- Dayaw (2023, program produced by the NCCA, replay from the ABS-CBN News Channel)
- Digong Diaries Special (DDS) Podcast (2017, hookup from Radio-Television Malacanañg)
- Diretsahan (2020)
- DOH Virtual Press Briefing (2020)
- DSWD Presser (2020)
- DOSTv sa Radyo (2017–20)
- Education Actionline
- Education Radio (2018–19)
- Ekslusibo sa 738
- Erwin Tulfo Live (2017)
- Erwin Tulfo On-Air with Niña Corpuz (2023)
- FOI sa Radyo (2020–22)
- Gearbox (2017, 2018–20)
- Gising na at Bangon pa (2018–20)
- Global Pinoy Konek (2023–24)
- Go Green Bayan
- Healthmax (2018–2020)
- Hi-Tech Pilipinas (2017–18)
- Home EcoNanay (2017–20, 2022–24; currently at Radyo Magasin)
- Highway of Information
- i-ARTA Na 'Yan! (2022)
- Inside Malacañang (2017–20, 2022–23)
- Isumbong Mo Kay Tulfo
- Jamon Bendijo
- Kaagapay ng Bayan (2016–17)
- Kaibigan sa Kalusugan
- Kalinga Hatid ng Red Cross (2020–22)
- Kalye Eskalera
- Kanan, Kanan Lang! (2023)
- Kapihan sa Bagong Pilipinas (2023)
- Kasindak-Sindak (2017–20)
- Kita ang Kita
- Kita Mo Na? (Galing ng Pinoy!) (2010–22)
- Konek Tayo
- Malacañang Insider (2024, produced by Radio-Television Malacañang)
- Magsasaka sa Radyo
- Maunlad na Agrikultura (2007–16)
- Mike Abe Live (2022–2025, also simulcast on PTV)
- MIMAROPA Ngayon (2017)
- Mornings with M
- Music and News (2023)
- Music automation (music block) (2017–20, 2020–22, 2024–25)
- Musical Sunday (1996–2017, hookup from DWBR)
- National Defense News
- Network Briefing News (2020–2022)
- News @ 1 (2012–16)
- News @ 6 (2012–16)
- On the Frontpage
- One ASEAN (2017, also broadcast from PTV)
- One Morning Cafe (2007–10, simulcast on NBN, RPN and IBC)
- Online Balita (2016–17)
- Operation Lokal (2017–23, 2024)
- Otro Cinco (2022–24)
- OPM Music (music block) (2017–20)
- Paalam, Santo Papa Francisco: A Radyo Pilipinas Special Coverage (April 26, 2025, also imulcast on Radyo Pilipinas - Sports Radio, Radyo Pilipinas - Radyo Magasin, with coverage on PTV and IBC)
- Paalam, Santo Papa Juan Pablo II: A Radyo ng Bayan Special Coverage April 8, 2005, also simulcast on DZSR-Sports Radio 918 kHz, DZRM Radyo Magasin 1278 kHz, with coverage on NBN, RPN and IBC)
- Paaralan ng Bayan
- Pangga Ruth Abao, Live! (2007–22)
- Para sa Masa (2023–24)
- Parangal Bayanihan at Samahan #WeHealAsOne Para sa mga Bayani ng Sambayanan (2020)
- Patrol ng Bayan
- Paul's Alarm (2022–25)
- PBS Mid-Hour News
- PBS News Now (2023–24)
- PCSO Lottery Draw (1995–2003, 2005–19, 2019–20, also simulcast on PTV)
- Prangkahan Na! (2025)
- Punto Asintado Reload (2023–25, also simulcast on PTV)
- Pilipinas, Pilipinas
- Pros & Cons with Usec. Joel Sy Egco (2018–19)
- PTV News (1995–98, 2016–17, 2017–20)
- Public Briefing: #LagingHandaPH (2020–23, hookup from PTV and IBC)
- Pulso ng Bayan (2020–22)
- Pulso ng Pilipinas (2017)
- Punto Perfecto
- PWD Phil Hour (2020–22)
- RadyoBisyon (2014–17, simulcast on PTV and IBC)
- Radyo Bulilit (2017–18)
- Radyo Journalismo
- Radyo ng Bayan Network Balita
- Radyo OFW (2017–19)
- Radyo Peryodiko (2016–17)
- Radyo Pilipinas Dos sa Radyo Pilipinas (2020–2024)
  - Game On: Isyu at Balita (2023–24)
  - PSC Hour (2020–22, 2023, 2023–24)
  - Philippine Sports Update (2022–23)
  - Sports News Roundup (2020–24)
- Radyo Pilipinas Network Balita Ngayon (2017–2023, hourly news update)
- Radyo Pilipinas News Nationwide (2017–present)
  - Radyo Pilipinas News Nationwide @ 7 am (2017–2024)
  - Radyo Pilipinas News Nationwide @ 12 nn (2017–2024)
  - Radyo Pilipinas News Nationwide Saturday/Sunday @ 12 nn (2017–20)
  - Radyo Pilipinas News Nationwide Saturday @ 6 am (2017–2025)
  - Radyo Pilipinas News Nationwide Sunday @ 7 am (2017–20)
- Radyo Pilipinas News Today (2017–18)
- Radyo Pilipinas Sports (2020)
- Regional Roundup (2018–2024)
- Ronda Patrol Alas Pilipinas (2018)
- Sagip Kalikasan (2017–19)
- Sentro Balita (2020, 2022–23, hookup from PTV)
- Serbisyo Publiko
- Serbisyong Coast Guard
- Sports 918 (2020)
- Serbisyo Pilipinas (2020–24)
- Sulong Kaibigan
- Talk to the People (2020–2022)
- Teka Muna (2026)
- Tinig ng Kalikasan (2017)
- Tropang Bistag (2017–22)
- Tunog ng Progreso (2018–20)
- Tutok Erwin Tulfo (2018–22)
- Tutok PDEA, Kontra Droga (2020–22)
- Ugat Pilipino
- Usap-Usapan (2016–17, 2022–2025)
- Usapang K (2021–22)
- Walang Sinasanto (2017–22)
- Youth for Truth (2019–22)

=== Sports Radio/Radyo Pilipinas Dos ===
- Ang Atleta
- Athletes' Corner (2022)
- BBC Sport
- Boxing K-N-B
- Balitang Pambansa (2024–25, simulcast on PTV, IBC, RP1/Radyo Pilipinas – Radyo Publiko, RP3/Radyo Magasin, Republika FM1/Republika ni Juan, Capital FM2/The Capital, PIA and PNA)
- Christian Music (2017–20)
- Chess Scholastics
- DepEd Radio (2020)
- Dream Date
- Get Back with The Beatles (2022)
- Mid-Evening with The Beatles (2017–20)
- OPM Music (2017–20)
- PBS Network News
- PBS News Now (2023–24)
- PCSO Lottery Draw (2017–20)
- Philippine Sports Update (2022–23)
- PNA Newsroom (2017–18)
- POC/PSC Radio Forum (1995–2019)
- PSA Radio Forum
- PTV Sports (2012–16)
- Public Briefing: #LagingHandaPH (2022–23, hookup from PTV and IBC)
- Racing Talk
- Radyo Pilipinas sa Radyo Pilipinas Dos/Sports Radio (2017–2020, 2022–present)
  - #LagingHanda, #COVID19PH Radio: The Radyo Pilipinas Special Coverage (2022)
  - Ang Maestro Atbp. (2017–18)
  - Bangon, Bayang Mahal! (2022–23)
  - Cabinet Report sa TeleRadyo (2017–18)
  - Doctor On Board (2022–24)
  - Kapihan sa Bagong Pilipinas (2023)
  - Kasindak-sindak (2017–18)
  - Mark In, Mark Out (2024)
  - Radyo Pilipinas Live (2022
  - Ronda Pilipinas (2017–24)
  - Serbisyo Pilipinas (2017–20, 2022–24)
- RP2 Playback (2022)
- Saturday Jam
- SEA Games Hour (2022)
- Sounds of Sports
- Sports Chat (2017–18)
- Sports Eye (2018–22)
- Sports Jam (2022)
- SR Time-Out
- Sports, Isyu, Balita
- Target On Air (2019–20)
- Tinig ng Kababaihan (2022; currently at Radyo Pilipinas and Radyo Magasin)
- The Scene Around
- Word from Our Sponsor
- Youth Service

=== Radyo Magasin/Radyo Pilipinas Dos/Radyo Pilipinas Tres (RP3 Alert) ===
- ASEAN Beyond Boundaries (2018, from PTV)
- Afternoon Delight
- Alerto 1278 (2024)
- Alerto Pilipinas (2023–24)
- Alertong Serbisyo (2024)
- Balita at Panayam (2016–17)
- Balitang Pambansa (2024–25, simulcast on PTV, IBC, RP1/Radyo Pilipinas – Radyo Publiko, RP2/Sports Radio, Republika FM1/Republika ni Juan, FM2/The Capital, PIA and PNA)
- BFP Live! (2025)
- Bonggang Morning
- Bonggang Sunday
- Boses ng Sambayanan (2017)
- Buhay Pamilya (2017–20)
- Buwelo sa Bagong Bukas (2024)
- Buzz Magazine (2017)
- Chikahan
- DepEd Radio (2020–22)
- Diretsahan (2019–20)
- FHM with Yami
- Filipinas, Ahora Mismo (2007–09)
- Gabay at Balita
- Golden Heart (2025)
- Good Vibes Morning (2023–24)
- Handa KNB? (2024)
- Harana ng Puso (2017–20)
- Hatid Sundo
- Himig Natin
- Hype na Buhay 'To! (2018–20, 2023–24)
- Kilos Pronto (2017, simulcast from PTV)
- Lakbay Radyo, Bakasyon Pilipinas
- Letters and Souvenirs (2023–24)
- Making Good (2017–20)
- May Nagmamasid
- OPM Tayo
- P.L.A.K.A. (2017–20)
- Palaban (2018–20)
- Pawsitive Vibes (2025)
- PBS News Now (2023–24)
- Power to Unite
- Pulso ng Sambayanan (2017–19; currently at DZRJ 810 Radyo Bandido)
- PWD Phil Hour (2017–19)
- Radio and Music
- Radyo Bombero (2024–25)
- Radyo Pilipinas sa Radyo Pilipinas Tres/Radyo Magasin (2023–present)
  - Celebrating Life (2024–25
  - Doctors on Board (2024–25, 2025)
  - Impormasyon at Aksyon sa Bagong Pilipinas (2025)
  - Mabuhay Pilipinas (2023–25)
  - Usapang Agrikultura (2025–2026)
- Radyo Tabloid (2018–20)
- Radyo Taliba (2017–18)
- Responde Ora Mismo (2024)
- Sabado at si Antonio
- Sakay Na! The LTFRB Hour (2025)
- Sama-Sama, Salo-Salo
- Say Mo, Say Ko
- Sitsirya
- Radyo Pilipinas Dos/Sports Radio sa Radyo Pilipinas Tres/Radyo Magasin (2024–present)
  - Fight News Weekly (2024)
  - Game On! Isyu at Balita (2024)
  - LGU Sports Center (2025)
  - PSC Hour (2024–25)
  - Sports News Roundup (2023–24)
- Sunday Memory Lane
- The Buzz Magazine (2017–18)
- The Elvis Presley Show (2017–20)
- The Lady Love
- Tipanan kay Ate Pining
- Titos sa Tanghali (2017–20)
- Trip Trip Lang (2023–24)
- Youthtalks

=== Radyo Pilipinas Worldwide ===
- ASEAN Song
- Bakasyon Pilipinas
- Doctor on Board
- From Philippines with Love
- It's More Fun in the Philippines
- Kwento ng Buhay at Tagumpay
- Music from the Region
- Philippines City
- Philippine Trivia
- PNA Newsroom (2017–2022)
- PSA Census Serbilis Balita
- School on Air
- Usapang Barangay

=== Business Radio ===
- Across d' Silver Frame
- Ben's Kitchen
- Broadcasters Bureau
- Business Brew
- Business Today
- Classical Hour
- Executive Coach
- Executive Hour
- Feature Time
- Fresh with George Boone
- Golden Memories
- Golden Years Special
- Healthcare Plus
- Insurance for All
- Kahapon Lamang
- Kalikasan Vigilante
- Kundiman Specials
- Latin Fiesta
- Magic Moments
- Make My Day with Larry Henares (2002–14)
- Metro Rhythms
- Morning Grooves
- Mornings with M
- Movie Melodies
- Music Cafe
- Musical Profiles
- Musical Souvenirs
- Musical Sunday
- Noontime Melodies
- OPM Centerstage
- OPM Classics
- OPM: Only Pilipino Melodies
- PBS Network News
- Pop Symphony
- President in Focus
- Rhythm In Revolution
- Rise and Shine
- Sports Chat
- Sunday Sweet Sunday
- The Law of the Heart is Love
- The Other Office
- This I Like
- Time Warp

=== FM1/Republika FM1 ===
- Balitang Pambansa (2024–25, simulcast on PTV, IBC, RP1/Radyo Pilipinas – Radyo Publiko, RP2/Sports Radio, RP3/Radyo Magasin, FM2/The Capital, PIA and PNA)
- Boom-Boom Bastic
- FM1 for the Road
  - FM1 Super Five
- FM1 Weekly Top 30
- Joyride
- Morning Mishmash
- Music Mission
- Pajamawhamma
- PBS News Now (2023–24)
- Republ1ka Weekly Top 30
- SlowMo
- Sprack Attack
- Sunday Y2K
- The Morning Ma-jiggy
- Segments:
  - Fresh 1
  - Juan on 1
- Sunday Slaps
- Weekend Recovery Radio

=== FM2/Capital FM2 ===
- Balitang Pambansa (2024–25, simulcast on PTV, IBC, RP1/Radyo Pilipinas – Radyo Publiko, RP2/Sports Radio, RP3/Radyo Magasin, Republika FM1/Republika ni Juan, PIA and PNA)
- BBC World Service News (1986–2024, international news bulletin)
- (Capital) FM2 Three in a Row Dance Mixes
- Capital Drive
  - Capital Drive Weekend
  - Sunday Capital Drive
- Dance Republic
- Decompression Session
- Freeway Friday
  - Master Class
  - WAR: Weekend All Requests
- Friday 24K
- Friday Y2K
- Hometown Heroes
- Jason on the Radio
- Parangal Bayanihan at Samahan #WeHealAsOne Para sa mga Bayani ng Sambayanan (2020)
- PBS News Now (2023–24)
- Radyo Pilipinas sa Capital (2026–present)
  - Balitang Bayan Alas 5ingko (2026)
  - Radyo Pilipinas Live (2025–2026)
- Rhythm N' Booze
- Steady Sunday
- The Nicest of the 90’s
- The North Andrew Show
- Today’s Top Stories from the Capital

== See also ==
- Presidential Broadcast Service
- Radyo Pilipinas – Radyo Publiko
- Radyo Pilipinas – Sports Radio
- Radyo Pilipinas – Radyo Magasin
- Radyo Pilipinas World Service
- 87.5 Republika ni Juan
- 104.3 The Capital
