= Filipinas, Ahora Mismo =

Filipino cultural radio magazine program

- Filipinas Ahora Mismo logo
- Genre: Cultural, Informative, Educational
- Running time: 60 minutes, Mondays to Fridays (airs without commercials)
- Country of origin: Quezon City, Philippines; Cádiz, Andalucía, Spain
- Home station: DZRM Radyo Manila 1278 Khz
- Starring: Main Anchor: Bon Vibar (Seasons 1-5); José Ricardo Molina (Season 1) Segment Hosts (Season 1): Theresa José; Camille Tan; Christine Cruz Rávago Segment Hosts (Season 2): Armis Obeña Bajar; María Mendoza; Mónica Rodriguez; Mark Jason Villa; Christine Cruz Rávago Segment Hosts (Season 3): Richard Allan Aquino; José Juan Ramírez de Cartagena; Fernando Gómez de Liaño; Stephanie Palallos; Christine Cruz Rávago Segment Hosts (Season 4): Javier Escat; Cheryll Ruth Ramirez; Marlon James Sales; Carmen Tejada; Christine Cruz Rávago Segment Hosts (Season 5): Armis Obeña Bajar; Mónica Rodriguez; Theresa José; José Juan Ramírez de Cartagena; Christine Cruz Rávago
- Created by: Asociación de la Prensa de Cádiz; Proyecto de Cooperación Radyo Manila; Bureau of Broadcast Services
- Original release: March 2007 – September 2009
- No. of episodes: 5 per week, except Maundy Thursday and Good Friday during Holy Week.
- Website: Asociación de la Prensa de Cádiz; Cádiz 2012

Filipinas, Ahora Mismo, or Pilipinas, Ora Mismo (English translation: Philippines, Right Now), was a nationally syndicated, 60-minute, cultural radio magazine program in the Philippines broadcast daily in Spanish for five seasons from March 2007 to September 2009. The only one of its kind in the country, it was presented by veteran radio announcer, and stage, television and movie actor, Bon Vibar.

== Background ==
Created by the Cádiz Press Association (or Asociación de la Prensa de Cádiz, APC) as part of the Cádiz 2012 project, the show was primarily targeted at Filipino listeners who could speak and understand Spanish. The program was a mixture of cultural, informative and educational reviews of various topics ranging from literature to cinema to history to geography to cuisine, all interspersed with traditional and modern music sung in Spanish. It aimed to promote Filipino culture and its ties with Spain, the empire that ruled the nation for 333 years. It also commemorated the forthcoming bicentenary of the Spanish Constitution of 1812, which was passed by the Cortes of Cádiz – which served as a parliamentary Regency after Ferdinand VII was deposed by Napoleon.

The show was first broadcast in March 2007. There were no commercials in each episode as the show was fully funded by APC and the Government of Andalucia, Spain.

Originally slated to fulfill a four-season contract, the program was renewed for a fifth season on February 20, 2009, until it aired its finale on September 1, 2009, due to a cut in funding from Spain as that nation was at the time in the throes of that year's economic recession.

== Development aid ==
Unknown to many, the show was only one of three components that comprised a development project called "Proyecto de Cooperación Radio Manila (La Voz de Manila)", or "Radyo Manila Development Project" of APC. It was produced in coordination with Manila-based Fundación Santiago, a Filipino organization established and registered in 1993 that advocates cultural diversity and integration by promoting and sustaining historical awareness.

Its first component, a scholarship program called "Curso Teórico-Práctico del Periodismo Radiofónico", was targeted to develop the skills of Filipino mass media practitioners and students. It originally ran for two years, from March 19, 2007, to March 1, 2009, and was divided into four semesters, each lasting six months, or a credit of 432 hours.

The radio show Filipinas, Ahora Mismo, the project's second component, created a venue for the apprenticeship of the scholars who acted as production staff, writers, translators, and segment hosts, in a study-work setup called "Inserción Laboral de Profesionales del Periodismo".

The third component of the project was the development of the facilities of the Bureau of Broadcast Services (BBS). The broadcasting and office equipment, donated by Canal Sur (RTVA) and Axon, were released in June 2008 during the show's third season.

Graduation ceremony of the first batch of scholars on September 1, 2007, at the Instituto Cervantes in Manila, Philippines. (From L-R) José Ricardo Molina (Fundación Santiago), José Rodríguez Rodríguez (Instituto Cervantes) and Begoña Lucena (APC).

=== Training ===
The training was conducted by members of APC in collaboration with the Instituto Cervantes in Manila. The one-week training, dubbed "Curso de Radiodifusión en Español", or "Radio Broadcasting in Spanish Course", served as an intensive 15-hour workshop for applicants who were pre-screened based on language and vocal skills. In those sessions, the participants were introduced to the world of radio broadcasting, where they performed several exercises to prepare them for a possible stint in the radio.

Similar to popular talent reality shows on television such as American Idol and Pinoy Dream Academy, there was an elimination process that culminated in the selection of the top four participants who would be granted the six-month scholarship program after careful deliberation among the project coordinators. The chosen scholars would then become part of the production staff of the radio program Filipinas, Ahora Mismo.

=== Scholarship ===
Each scholar received a monthly allowance of €420. A scholar could only be granted a scholarship once and could not reapply. Thus, there were no repeaters in the course of the original two-year program.

At the end of each semester, a formal graduation ceremony was held, still at the Instituto Cervantes, where the coordinators would also announce the names of the new batch of scholars who would carry on with the radio program for its new season.

Upon graduation, the scholars were awarded certificates of completion in "Curso Teórico-Práctico del Periodismo Radiofónico" from Spain.

An exception to the "no renewal" rule was made for the fifth season, when four previous scholars were asked to return to help produce the final season of the radio program.

=== Sponsors ===
Aside from APC, the BBS, Fundación Santiago and Instituto Cervantes, Filipinas, Ahora Mismo was also sponsored by the Junta de Andalucía, Diputación de Cádiz, and the Agencia Española de Cooperación Internacional of the Ministerio de Asuntos Exteriores y de Cooperación of Spain.

== Broadcast Information ==
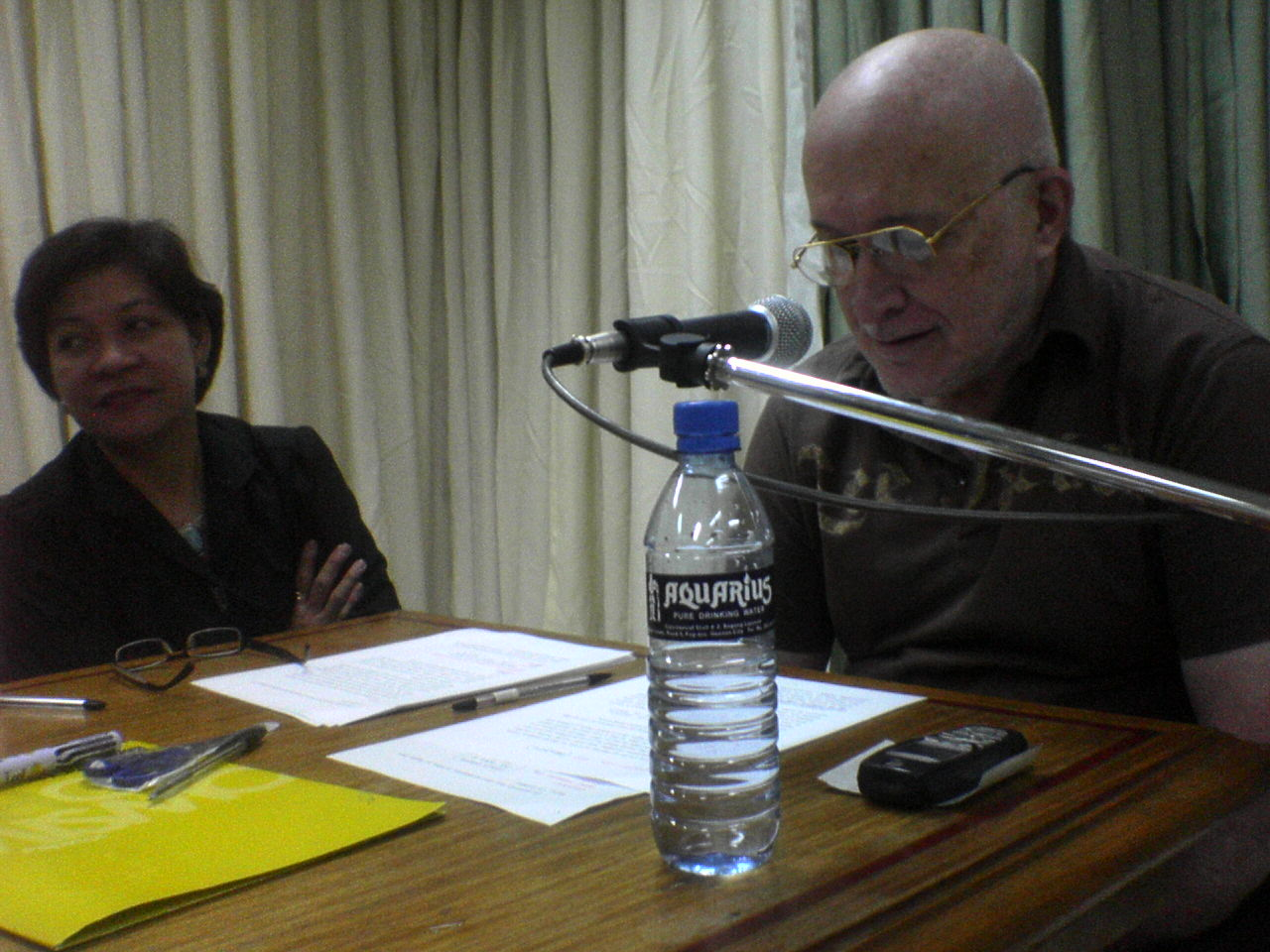
On the left is project manager Christine Cruz Rávago, and beside her is actor Bon Vibar, the current main host of the program Filipinas, Ahora Mismo.

The show was pre-taped a week before the actual broadcast, and episodes were broadcast daily from 7:00pm to 8:00pm (UTC+8) on DZRM Radyo Manila 1278 kHz (now known as Radyo Pilipinas — Magasin).

The recordings were done every Tuesdays and Thursdays (Mondays and Wednesdays in Season One) at the BBS Drama Studio I, located at the Philippine Information Agency building in Quezon City in Metro Manila. Vibar was dubbed the "voice" of the program.

The presentation ran in syndication and was broadcast simultaneously on several AM radio stations in the Philippines where there was a considerable number of Spanish-speakers: Mega Manila, Iloilo, Laoag, Naga, Zamboanga, and Cebu. For international listeners, the show could be accessed through live streaming on the APC website.

Future plans of the program's creators included broadcasting it through 104.3 Business Radio (now 104.3 FM2) and a possible expansion to a television adaptation and/or webcast after the original two-year contract.

=== Companion Show ===
Logo of the companion radio show Las Riquezas de España.

Las Riquezas de España, or "The Richness of Spain" was a 45-minute companion program of Filipinas, Ahora Mismo and aired every Saturday, 7:15pm to 8:00pm (UTC+8) on 104.3 Business Radio (now 104.3 FM2), the FM radio station of Philippine Broadcasting Service, which also owns DZRB, DZSR, DWFO, and DZRM (now RP3 Alert). It showcased the rich culture and legacy of Spain through various reviews of sights, sounds, and trivia. Bon Vibar also hosted this show, but the scholars did not appear in it. The scholars, however, still acted as translators for the show.

== Season one ==
Spanish radio presenter Carlos Juan Juan from Onda Zero was the first representative of APC to train the pioneer batch of scholars from the Philippines. He also recorded the official introduction of the show in Spanish, while the official Tagalog version was done by Evelyn Ágato of BBS. Both versions were used to introduce each episode until the end of the series in 2009. Vibar recorded the program I.D.

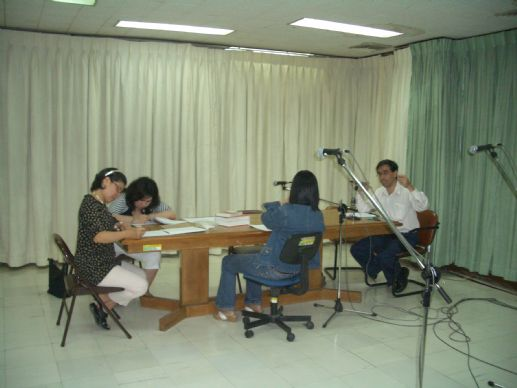
Filipinas, Ahora Mismo Season One presenters, with the original main host, José Ricardo Molina (far right). With him in the photo are Christine Cruz Rávago (far left), Camille Tan and Theresa José (back facing the camera).

=== The Scholars ===
- Vilma Kilapkilap
- Theresa José
- Elpidio Paligutan
- Camille Tan

=== Segments ===
- Película -- Movie review
- Literatura -- Literature
- Geografía -- Geography
- Historia -- History
- Gastronomía -- Cuisine

Season One had fewer segments than subsequent seasons, and each section was given a longer airtime.

Fundación Santiago executive director José Ricardo "Chaco" Molina was the original coordinator and initial anchor of the show, and he was part of the first few episodes. Christine Cruz Rávago then took over as project manager on behalf of Molina, and Vibar was chosen as main host. Molina's voice is still heard on the program introducing some of the segments and remains as its editorial director. Kilapkilap was not part of the training class nor original line-up of scholars and broadcast team, as she was chosen as replacement when one of the original scholars was not able to continue with the project, and she only worked as a behind-the-scenes translator. Paligutan was on-air for a few episodes, and later also opted to focus on the translation of the scripts. Tan acted as main musical director, while José was overall-in-charge of production for most of the episodes. José also guested once on Riquezas de España.

== Season two ==
Training was conducted from August 27 to September 1, 2007, by famous radio and television personality from Cádiz, Begoña Lucena, who also guested on Filipinas, Ahora Mismo as segment host in a few episodes.

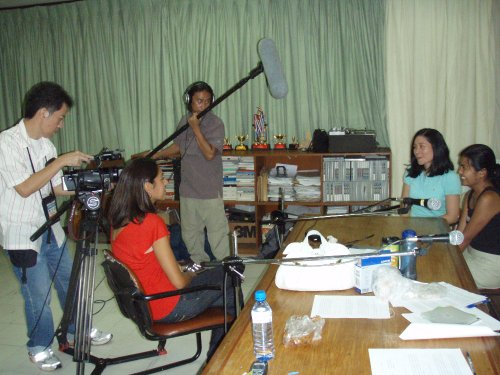
Begoña Lucena of APC interviews Mónica Rodríguez and María Mendoza (far right), Season Two segment hosts and scholars of the radio program Filipinas, Ahora Mismo, for a television show.

=== The Scholars ===
- Armis Obeña Bajar
- María Mendoza
- Mónica Rodriguez
- Mark Jason Villa

=== Segments ===
- De Película -- Movie review
- ¿Sabias Qué? -- Trivia
- Vamos a Leer -- Literature
- Tu Salud al Día -- Health
- De Isla en Isla -- Geography
- Aprendemos Español -- Spanish tutorial on air
- Camino de Cádiz -- Constitution of Cádiz
- Ventana al Pasado -- History
- Dichos y Refranes -- Philippine folk wisdom
- Mundo Mujer -- Women's issues
- Fogón de María -- Cuisine
- Deportes -- Sports

After a thorough assessment involving all the project heads and coordinators, the show underwent a major restructuring during this period, and the current segments were established. Some of the changes included shortening the sections and expanding the scope of the program. Covering various topics, the one-hour program was divided into 12 segments. The scholars were also given an option to interview personalities outside the studio, which were edited in during taping. Because of these innovations, there was a need to record new segment introductions, for which Molina's and Rodriguez's voices were used. The program also premiered in Zamboanga City after its launching on September 6, 2007, with Lucena and Molina as project representatives.

== Season three ==
The third season staff was formally announced on March 1, 2008, and began production three days later. They aired their first show on March 10 2008, when the main presenter introduced to the public the new segment hosts who were selected from the workshop held from February 25 to 29, 2008. The new batch was again trained by Juan, who returned as mentor from Season One. Rávago was still the project coordinator, as well as anchor for the trivia section ¿Sabías Qué?.

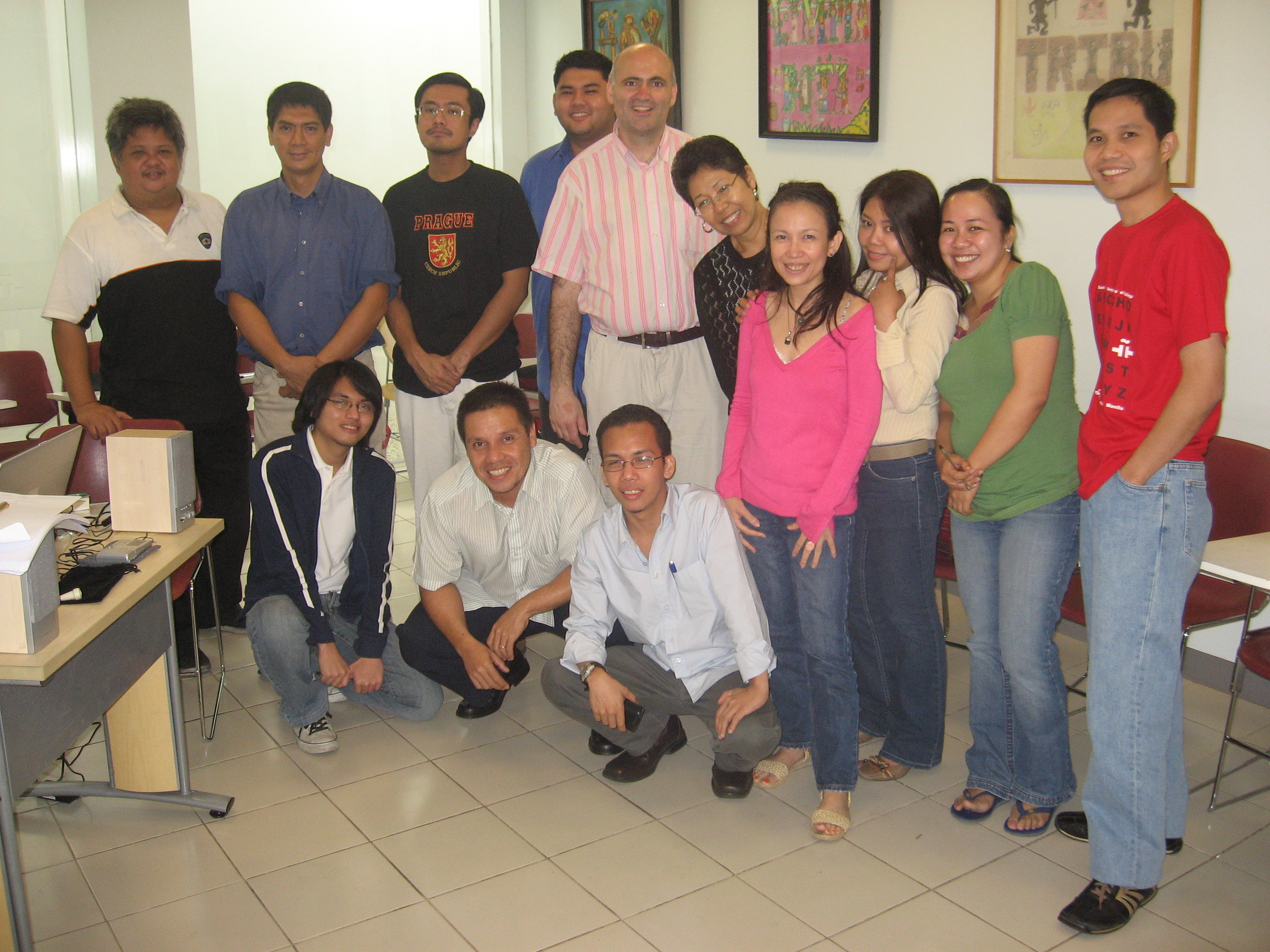
Training class for Filipinas, Ahora Mismo Season Three, held at Instituto Cervantes de Manila from February 25 to March 1, 2008, with Asociación de la Prensa de Cádiz representative, Carlos Juan Juan of Onda Zero (pictured at the centre). The new scholars are Richard Allan Aquino (seated, first from left), José Juan Ramírez de Cartagena (seated, second from left), Fernando Gómez de Liaño (standing, fourth from left) and Stephanie Palallos (standing, fourth from right).

=== The Scholars ===
- Richard Allan Aquino - De Película & Camino de Cádiz
- José Juan Ramirez de Cartagena - Vamos a Leer, Ventana al Pasado & Fogón de María
- Fernando Gómez de Liaño - De Isla en Isla, Dichos y Refranes & Deportes
- Stephanie Palallos - Tu Salud al Día & Mundo Mujer

=== Segments ===
- De Película -- Movie review
- ¿Sabías Qué? -- Trivia
- Vamos a Leer -- Literature
- Tu Salud al Día -- Health
- De Isla en Isla -- Geography
- Aprendemos Español -- Spanish tutorial on air
- Camino de Cádiz -- Constitution of Cádiz
- Ventana al Pasado -- History
- Dichos y Refranes -- Philippine folk wisdom
- Mundo Mujer -- Women's issues
- Fogón de María -- Cuisine
- Deportes -- Sports

This season marked the launching of the show in Cebú City on March 14, 2008. While the show kept the format of the second season, a slight change was made in that the section Aprendemos Español was now to be hosted by the scholar on the days which he/she translated and musical-directed. Juan acted as guest presenter on two episodes of Filipinas, Ahora Mismo and once on Riquezas de España. He also performed as guest segment host on several occasions during the first two weeks of the season. Vibar re-recorded the program I.D. to reflect recent changes.

Nap Labao, one of the three technicians from DZRM assigned to the project for a year, died on March 23, 2008. The March 31, 2008, broadcast announced this news, as the immediate episode following his passing (March 24, 2008) had already been taped and distributed.

The scholars also campaigned for the show in various Hispanic restaurants and establishments around Metro Manila to promote the program.

== Season four ==
The fourth season, originally scheduled as the final season, commenced on September 1, 2008. APC's José Lorenzo Benitez conducted the training from August 26 to 29. The new set of hosts was introduced in the September 8, 2008, broadcast. The program ended in March 2009 when the fourth season aired its final week-long presentation.

=== The Scholars ===
In December 2008, the Season 4 scholars of Filipinas, Ahora Mismo attended the Christmas party together with former scholars and crew of the show, from Seasons 1 to 3, in Quezon City.

- Javier Escat
- Cheryll Ruth "Lot" Ramirez
- Marlon James Sales
- Carmen Tejada

=== Segments ===
- De Película -- Movie review
- ¿Sabias Qué? -- Trivia
- Vamos a Leer -- Literature
- Tu Salud al Día -- Health
- De Isla en Isla -- Geography
- Aprendemos Español -- Spanish tutorial on air
- Camino de Cádiz -- Constitution of Cádiz
- Ventana al Pasado -- History
- Dichos y Refranes -- Philippine folk wisdom
- Mundo Mujer -- Women's issues
- Fogón de María -- Cuisine
- Deportes -- Sports
- Voces -- Interviews

Debuting as a new segment this season, Voces, which means "voices" in English, included regular interviews featuring Spanish-speaking personalities in the Philippines. While previous seasons also presented sporadic interviews in various episodes, the interviews were incorporated as special features of other existing segments. For this new section's recorded introduction, Ramírez de Cartagena's voice was used. The show's segments were also retained by new mentor Benitez. However, at least three scholars appeared in each of them, thereby removing a scholar's exclusive ownership of a particular section.

== Season Five ==
Fundación Santiago head Molina announced in February 2009 that APC extended the project for a fifth season, where previous scholars would be returning to complete the cast. The final season began production on March 1, 2009, and ended six months later.

=== The Returning Scholars ===
- Armis Obeña Bajar
- Theresa José
- José Juan Ramírez de Cartagena
- Mónica Rodríguez

=== Segments ===
- De Película -- Movie review
- ¿Sabias Qué? -- Trivia
- Vamos a Leer -- Literature
- Tu Salud al Día -- Health
- De Isla en Isla -- Geography
- Aprendemos Español -- Spanish tutorial on air
- Camino de Cádiz -- Constitution of Cádiz
- Ventana al Pasado -- History
- Dichos y Refranes -- Philippine folk wisdom
- Mundo Mujer -- Women's issues
- Fogón de María -- Cuisine
- Deportes -- Sports
- Voces -- Interviews

There were no major changes made for the show's structure in its final season, except that the scripts were no longer written in English or Tagalog and subsequently translated and/or enhanced by their Spanish translations. New content were drafted in Spanish and broadcast a few days later.

The technical directors of the radio program Filipinas Ahora Mismo, during a taping session on its third season at the BBS Drama Studio I. (L-R) Meynard de la Cruz, Julius Ungab.

- Executive Director - José Ricardo Molina (Fundación Santiago)
- Program Director - Christine Cruz Rávago
- Project Coordinator - Evelyn Ágato (BBS)
- Translators/Music Supervisors - The Scholars
- Scriptwriters/Researchers - BBS Staff
- Technical Directors - Meynard de la Cruz, Julius Ungab
- Technical Support - Bert Espinosa, Noriel Pineda, Nap Labao^{†} (DZRM)

== Season Six ==
September 2010 to February 2011

Hosts: Carlos Juan, Hannah Alcoseba, Francis Juen, Wilbert Sasuya, and Francis Atayza

== See also ==
- List of Filipinas, Ahora Mismo hosts
