= List of Filipinas, Ahora Mismo hosts =

This is a list of hosts of Filipinas, Ahora Mismo, or Pilipinas, Ora Mismo, (English translation: Philippines, Right Now), a syndicated 60-minute, cultural radio magazine program in the Philippines broadcast entirely in Spanish.

== Main Anchor ==
- José Ricardo Molina
- José Vicente Fábregas Vibar, also known as Bon Vibar

== Season one ==
Original Broadcast Dates: March 2007 - September 2007

- Vilma Kilapkilap
- Theresa José
- Elpidio Paligutan
- Camille Tan

== Season two ==
Original Broadcast Dates: September 2007 - March 2008

- Armis Obeña Bajar
- María Mendoza
- Mónica Rodriguez
- Mark Jason Villa

== Season three ==
Original Broadcast Dates: March 2008 - September 2008

- Richard Allan Aquino
- José Juan Ramirez de Cartagena
- Fernando Gómez de Liaño
- Stephanie Palallos

== Season four ==
Original Broadcast Dates: September 2008 - March 2009

- Javier Escat
- Cheryll Ruth "Lot" Ramirez
- Marlon James Sales
- Carmen Tejada

== Season six ==
September 2010 to February 2011

Hosts: Carlos Juan, Hannah Alcoseba, Francis Juen, Wilbert Sasuya, and Francis Atayza

== Production staff ==
- Executive Director - José Ricardo Molina (Fundación Santiago)
- Project Manager - Christine Cruz Rávago
- Project Coordinator - Evelyn Ágato (BBS)
- Translators/Music Supervisors - The Scholars
- Scriptwriters/Researchers - BBS Staff
- Technical Directors - Meynard de la Cruz, Julius Ungab
- Technical Support - Bert Espinosa, Noriel Pineda, Nap Labao^{†} (DZRM)
