= José Rodríguez Rodríguez =

Spanish writer and newspaper journalist (born 1950)

- Born: June 20, 1950 (age 74); San Xoán de Río, Spain
- Occupation: journalist, writer
- Spouse: Lourdes Coching

Jose "Pepe" Rodriguez Rodriguez is a Spanish writer and newspaper journalist who has focused primarily on Galicia and the Philippines.

== Early life and education ==
Pepe Rodriguez was born in San Xoán de Río on June 20, 1950 and spent his childhood and his youth in the province of Ourense, Galicia. After obtaining his university degree in Agricultural Engineering in Madrid, Pepe had a brief military service in the Sahara desert. He received a PhD honoris causa in the Humanities by the University of Manila, Saint Mary's University of Nueva Vizcaya, and Western Mindanao State University of Zamboanga City.

== Career ==
Rodriguez began working as journalist and a correspondent for major Spanish dailies in the Philippines. He worked as editor-in-chief of Agencia EFE, the Spanish international news agency, and was the regional head for Southeast Asia and the Pacific. Together with Raul Manglapus and other Philippine hispanists, he co-founded the weekly “Crónica de Manila,” a Philippine publication in Spain. José Rodriguez also founded the Centro Gallego de Filipinas, an association of Galicians in Asia for the purpose of promoting relations between the region of Galicia and Philippines.

Rodriguez was the director of the Royal Academy of the Spanish Language in the Philippines from 1994 to 2003, and is an associate of the Academies of the United States of America, Chile, El Salvador, and is a former director of Instituto Cervantes in Manila.

He is the author of Crónicas: Random Recollections of a Spanish Journalist in the Philippines, Philippines First Ladies Portraits, Front Pages of Philippine History: Primeras Páginas de la Historia de Filipinas, and is co-author of Cruceiro: Spanish Galicia at Some Crossroads in Philippine History and Culture (1521–1898).

== Awards ==
Rodriguez has been awarded the Encomienda de Isabel la Católica the Order of Sikatuna, Medal of Galicia, and Terras de Trives Tourism Award.

== Personal life ==
Rodriguez is married to Filipino artist Lourdes Coching.
