= DWFO =

Radio station in Metro Manila, Philippines

Republika ni Juan (DWFO)
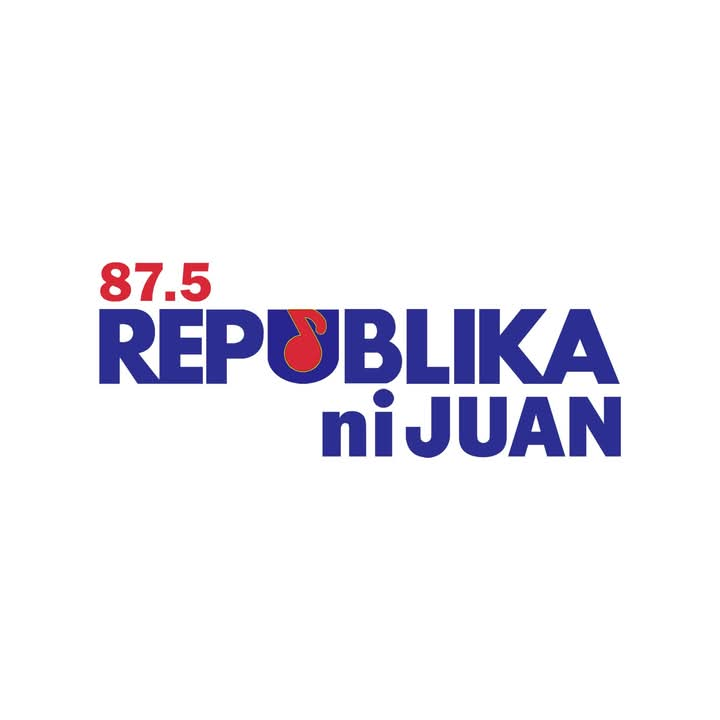
- Quezon City; Philippines
- Broadcast area: Mega Manila and surrounding areas
- Frequency: 87.5 MHz
- RDS: DWFO-FM1
- Branding: 87.5 Republika ni Juan

Programming
- Language: Filipino
- Format: Contemporary MOR, OPM

Ownership
- Owner: Presidential Broadcast Service
- Sister stations: Radyo Pilipinas - Radyo Publiko; Sports Radio; Radyo Magasin; Capital 104.3; Radyo Pilipinas World Service

History
- First air date: January 1, 2018
- Former names: FM1 (2017–June 11, 2020); Republika/FM1 (June 12, 2020–January 2025)
- Call sign meaning: FM One (former branding)

Technical information
- Licensing authority: NTC
- Class: A, B and C
- Power: 25,000 watts (10,000 watts on-operational power output)
- ERP: 30,000 watts
- Repeater: Davao City: 87.9 MHz

Links
- Webcast: Listen Live
- Website: pbs.gov.ph/stations/

DWFO (87.5 FM), broadcasting as 87.5 Republika ni Juan, is a radio station owned and operated by the Presidential Broadcast Service, the broadcast arm of the Presidential Communications Office. Its studios and transmitter are located at the 4th Floor, Philippine Information Agency Building, Visayas Ave., Quezon City.

== History ==
=== Prior history ===
Prior to the PBS's acquisition, the Kapisanan ng mga Brodkaster ng Pilipinas (KBP) asked the National Telecommunications Commission (NTC) to reserve the said frequency for local campuses (including Angelicum College, where they own the said frequency under the call letters DWAC-FM) due to multiple reports that some others will use the latter frequency for commercial purposes. Also, a few religious and community groups (such as Jehovah's Witnesses) operated the frequency with a low-powered signal enough to cover its main target area.

=== Acquisition by PBS ===
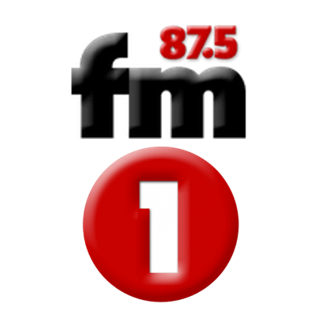
87.5 FM1 logo from 2017 to 2020

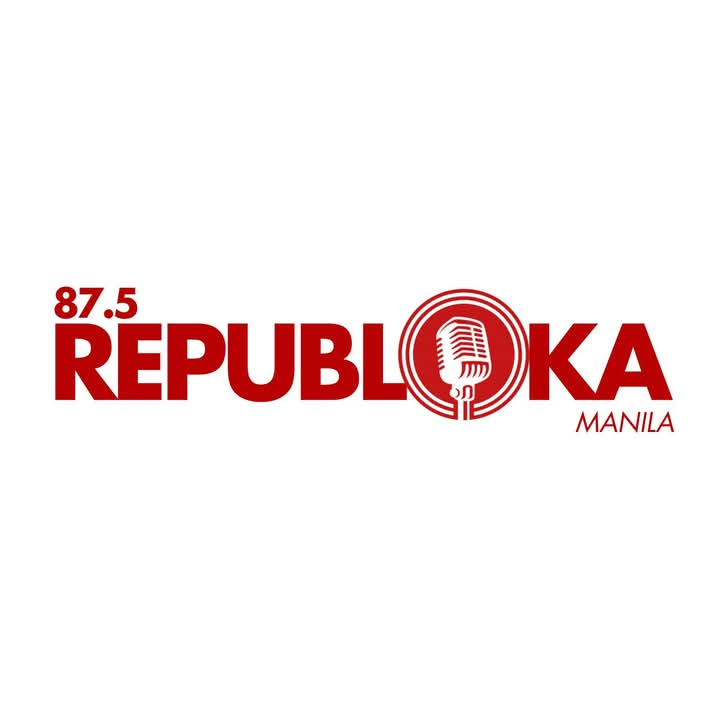
87.5 Republika logo from September 2024 to January 2025

In July 2016, radio veteran Rizal "Bong" Aportadera Jr., also known as Sonny B, was appointed Director General of the Philippine Broadcasting Service (PBS) by then Presidential Communications Operations Office (PCOO) Secretary Martin Andanar.

Shortly after, PBS acquired the 87.5 MHz frequency with approval from the National Telecommunications Commission (NTC).

On November 1, 2017, FM1 began its test broadcast at 1:00 AM. Within days, the station's DJs- many of whom were former talents from Mellow 947 and Tiger22 stations (such as 99.5 Play FM, Wave 89.1, Jam 88.3, Magic 89.9 and 103.5 K-Lite)- identified the station under the call sign DWFO, pending NTC confirmation.

Initially operating at 1 kW, FM1 increased its transmission power in two stages: first to 10 kW by December 28, 2017, and then to the maximum licensed FM output of 25 kW on January 1, 2018. This power boost allowed FM1 to reach a broader audience across Mega Manila and nearby provinces, although its Effective Radiated Power (ERP) remained lower than that of FM2, with further antenna orientation adjustments planned for improved coverage.

FM1 also announced plans for nationwide expansion, beginning with FM1 Davao, launched on August 1, 2018. The Davao frequency was later adjusted to 87.9 MHz in February 2020. Additional provincial stations were proposed for key cities, including Cebu, Cagayan de Oro, Bacolod, Iloilo, Baguio, Bohol, Boracay, General Santos, Laoag, Legazpi, Butuan, and Zamboanga.

On June 12, 2020, Philippine Independence Day, FM1 rebranded as REPUBLIKA FM1, adopting the slogan "Radio Republic of the Youth". This rebranding aligned with the earlier transformation of sister station FM2 into Capital FM2. The Davao station adopted the same branding.

On November 14, 2020, FM1 introduced Weekend Recovery Radio, a Saturday program featuring tracks from the past 3 to 10 years, replacing the previous Sunday Y2K program.

Under the new PBS director general Fernando "Dindo" Amparo Sanga since September 2024, the FM1 branding has officially dropped and its broadcast hours reduced from 6:00 am to 10:00 pm daily (same with sister station 104.3 The Capital and its Davao counterpart).

On January 2, 2025, the station temporarily adopted an adult-leaning Top 40 format, playing hits from the 2000s to the present. This change also led to the discontinuation of most specialty shows, including Weekend Recovery Radio and Sunday Slaps.

On February 1, 2025, the station shifted to a mass-based format. On February 14, 2025, it was relaunched as Republika ni Juan.
