= DZRM =

Radio station in Metro Manila, Philippines

Radyo Magasin (DZRM)
- Quezon City; Philippines
- Broadcast area: Mega Manila and surrounding areas
- Frequency: 1278 kHz
- Branding: Radyo Magasin

Programming
- Language: Filipino
- Format: Public radio
- Network: Radyo Pilipinas

Ownership
- Owner: Presidential Broadcast Service
- Sister stations: Radyo Pilipinas - Radyo Publiko; Sports Radio; 87.5 Republika ni Juan; 104.3 The Capital; Radyo Pilipinas World Service; PTV 4

History
- First air date: 1987
- Former frequencies: 1190 kHz (1958-1972); 105.5 MHz (1960s-1972); 960 kHz (1972-1986)
- Call sign meaning: Radyo Magasin; Radyo Maynila (branding used in the post-People Power Revolution years)

Technical information
- Licensing authority: NTC
- Power: 10,000 watts

Links
- Webcast: DZRM Radyo Pilipinas 3 Live Audio
- Website: radyopilipinas.ph/radyomagasin

DZRM (1278 AM), broadcasting as Radyo Magasin, is a radio station owned and operated by the Presidential Broadcast Service. The station's studios and offices are Located at the 4th Floor, PIA/Media Center Building, Visayas Avenue, Barangay Vasra, Diliman, Quezon City, and its transmitter at Barangay Marulas, Valenzuela.

== History ==
=== 1958-1987: Beginnings ===
The Philippine Broadcasting Service first launched DZRM in the 1958 on the original frequency of 1190 kHz with a 5 kilowatt transmission power. It was known as "The Nation's Station." The station later moved to 960 kHz (formerly used by the pre-Martial Law ABS-CBN radio station DZAQ) in 1972 and its original frequency was later awarded to DWBL. On November 23, 1978, in response to the adoption of the 9 kHz spacing on AM radio stations in the Philippines under the Geneva Frequency Plan of 1975, DZRM moves to its current frequency of 1278 kHz.

=== 1987–2017: The first iteration of Radyo Manila / Radyo Magasin ===
Radyo Magasin logo

The station was relaunched in 1987 as Radyo Maynila (the brand was previously used at 918 kHz during the Marcos regime prior to People Power Revolution) under the helm of former actor and BBS-PBS interim director Jose Mari Gonzales. Gonzales ordered that all BBS radio station will give their respective identities including Radyo ng Bayan (918 kHz), Sports Radio (738 kHz) and DZRP-Radyo Pagasa.

In the late-1990s/early 2000s, the station was reformatted as PBS's general information radio station under the name Radyo Magasin. It held a cultural-oriented format. It primarily focused on news, current events, and Philippine culture. Its broadcasting format was akin to the format of a printed magazine, thus its name.

From 2007 and 2009, DZRM was home of Spanish cultural magazine show, Filipinas, Ahora Mismo.

On September 17, 2017, Radyo Magasin went off the air. Its programming merged with DZSR's programming on Radyo Pilipinas Dos, which was launched the next day. The defunct station's audio streaming space, meanwhile, was then converted to DWFO's audio portal on November 1 after it started a series of tests broadcasts.

=== 2020–2023: DepEd TV simulcast ===
On October 5, 2020, DZRM returned on air, still carrying its old branding name. The following week, it began simulcasting DepEd TV programming as part of the country's distance learning initiative amid the COVID-19 pandemic until June 2022. Since its initial return to operations in October 2020, the station airs from Monday to Saturday from 6:00am to 8:00pm, with few programs and music automation for the rest of the schedule.

=== 2023–2025: RP3 Alert ===
Radyo Pilipinas 3 logo (2023-2025)

On April 10, 2023, the station was officially rebranded as Radyo Pilipinas 3 or RP3 Alert, serving as the radio station for emergency and disaster preparedness and information dissemination. In line with the rebranding, the station was set on test broadcast and officiated around May 3, 2023. Most of its programs were also simulcasted from its sister stations RP1 and RP2.

=== 2025–present: The second iteration of Radyo Magasin ===
On January 6, 2025, the station brought back the Radyo Magasin branding. The rebrand comes with minor schedule changes and new programs.
