= DZRB-AM =

Radio station in Metro Manila, Philippines

Radyo Pilipinas - Radyo Publiko (DZRB)
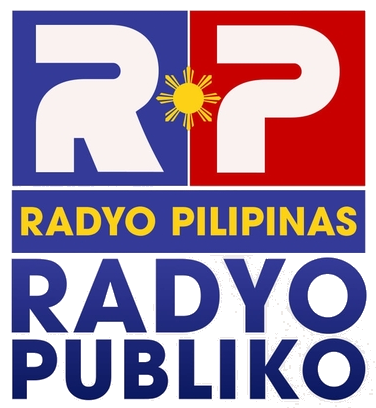
- Quezon City; Philippines
- Broadcast area: Mega Manila and surrounding areas
- Frequency: 738 kHz
- Branding: Radyo Pilipinas; Radyo Publiko

Programming
- Language: Filipino
- Format: News, Public Affairs, Talk, Government Radio
- Network: Radyo Pilipinas
- Affiliations: PTV

Ownership
- Owner: Presidential Broadcast Service
- Sister stations: Sports Radio; Radyo Magasin; Republika ni Juan; Capital; Radyo Pilipinas World Service; PTV 4

History
- First air date: May 1, 1933
- Former call signs: KZSO (1933–1944); KZFM (1944–1947); DZFM (1947–1987)
- Former frequencies: 710 kHz (1933–1978); 918 kHz (1978–1996)
- Call sign meaning: Radyo ng Bayan (former branding)

Technical information
- Licensing authority: NTC
- Class: A (clear frequency)
- Power: 50,000 watts

Links
- Webcast: Listen Live via Streema; Listen live (via TuneIn)
- Website: www.radyopilipinas.ph PBS

Availability

Terrestrial
- PTV (Nationwide): Channel x.03 (DTT)

Streaming media
- YouTube: Radyo Pilipinas's channel on YouTube

DZRB (738 AM), broadcasting as Radyo Pilipinas - Radyo Publiko, is a radio station owned and operated by the Presidential Broadcast Service, an attached agency under the Presidential Communications Office. It serves as the flagship station of the Radyo Pilipinas network. The station's studios are located at the 4/F, PIA/Media Center Building, Visayas Ave., Brgy. Vasra, Diliman, Quezon City, and its transmitter is located at Brgy. Marulas, Valenzuela City.

Established on May 8, 1933, DZRB is the first radio station in the Philippines before the launch of DZRH.

== History ==
On May 8, 1933, the Insular Government under the United States of America established and operated radio station KZSO in the Philippines, with a frequency of 710 kilohertz and power of 10,000 watts through the United States Information Service. In 1944, the callsign was change to KZFM, named after Frederick Marquardt.

In September 1946, two months after the Philippines gained independence from the United States, KZFM was turned over to the nascent Philippine government, and the Philippine Broadcasting Service was born.

The station was first operated by the Department of Foreign Affairs until it was transferred to the Radio Broadcasting Board (RBB) created by President Manuel Quezon on September 3, 1937. In the same year, an international telecommunications conference in Atlantic City, New Jersey, assigned the letter "D" to replace "K" as the initial call letter for all radio stations in the Philippines. In January 1942, the RBB was abolished to give way to the establishment of the Philippine Information Council (PIC) which then assumed the function of the RBB, including the operation of DZFM. In turn, the PIC was abolished on July 1, 1952, and since then, until the creation of the Department of Public Information (DPI) in 1959, DZFM and the Philippine Broadcasting Service (PBS) had been operated under the Office of the President.

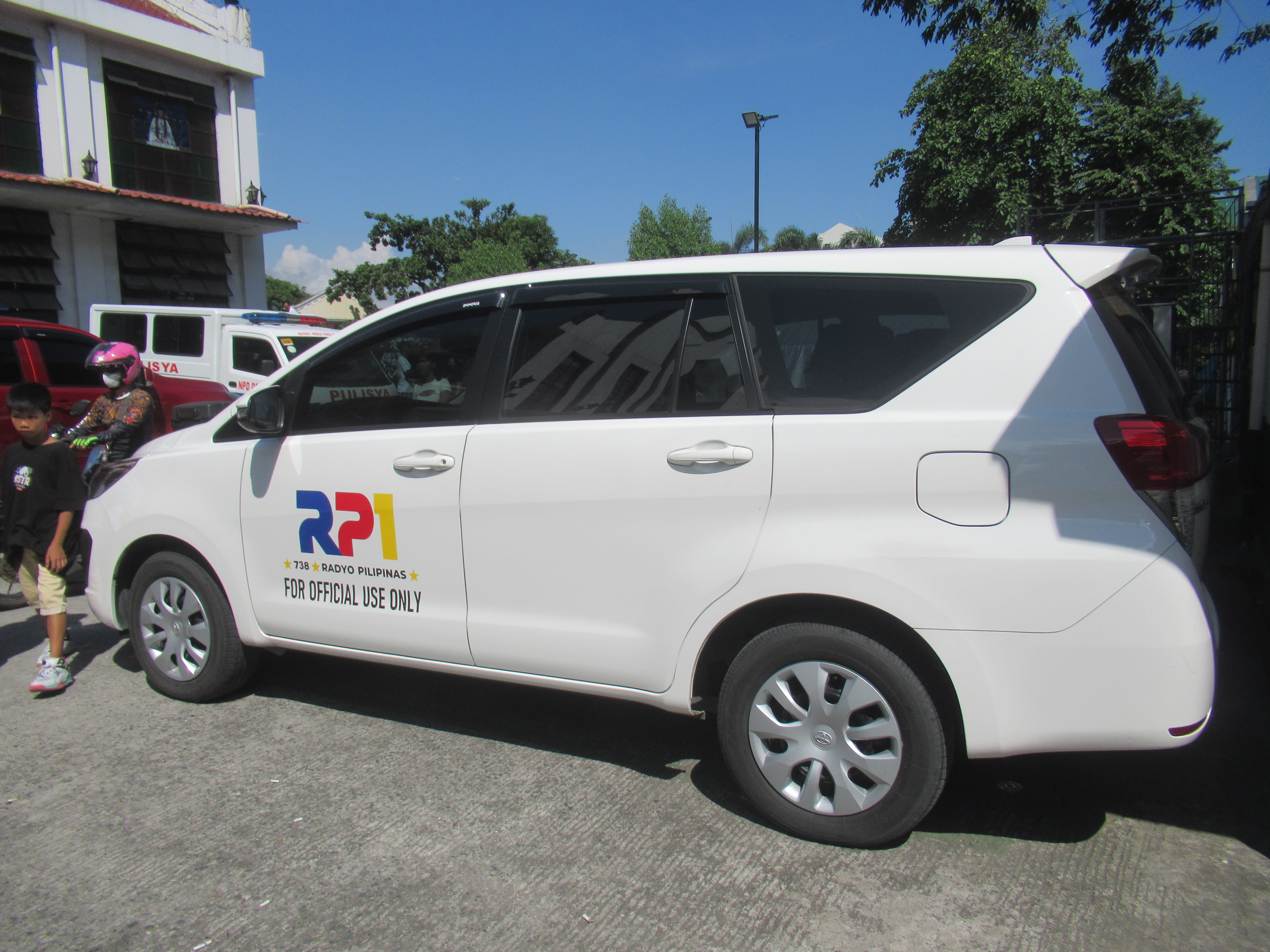
Vehicle (North Bay Boulevard)

During Martial Law, the Bureau of Broadcasts took over the station and became DPI Radio 1 / MPI Radio 1. In November 1978, due to the switch of the Philippine AM dial from the NARBA-mandated 10 kHz spacing to the 9 kHz rule implemented by the Geneva Frequency Plan of 1975, the station's frequency was transferred from 710 kHz to 918 kHz.

By the 1980s, DZFM served as the Tagalog service of The Voice of the Philippines on AM.

At the height of the 1986 People Power Revolution, DZFM was among various government stations taken over by former personnel of the pre-Martial Law ABS-CBN and incumbent Radyo Veritas airstaff supporting the mass protest. Along with the main Channel 4, the AM station would variously identify itself as Voice of the Free Philippines. Radyo Veritas staff would continue to use the facilities until March 2, 1986 when repairs of their home station's transmitting facilities were completed.. DZFM would be fully returned to the Bureau of Broadcast Services via the reinstated PBS months into the Corazon Aquino presidency

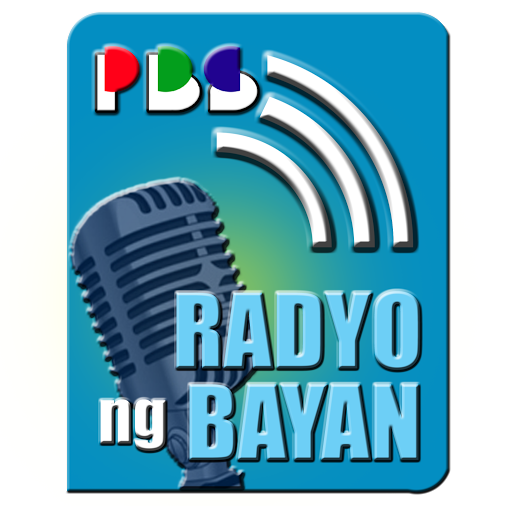
Logo of Radyo ng Bayan from 2013 to 2017

The station would later be reformatted as Sports Radio (the predecessor of Radyo Pilipinas 2).

On January 2, 1995, Presidential Order No. 293 ordered a frequency swap with Sports Radio moving to 918 kHz, and the flagship Radyo ng Bayan (People's Radio) moving to the current 738 kHz frequency.

During his first State of the Nation Address, then-President Rodrigo Duterte announced he would support a law merging PBS with its TV counterpart, People's Television Network, into the "People's Broadcasting Corporation (PBC)". This would however, never come to fruition.

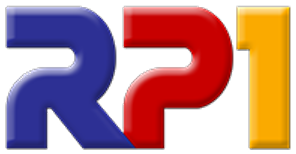
Radyo Pilipinas 1 logo from 2017 to 2025

PBS announced that Radyo ng Bayan & its provincial AM stations will undergo a major rebranding, merging with the "Radyo Pilipinas" brand by June 5, 2017. It was followed by the launching of Radyo Pilipinas Dos 918 kHz on September 18, 2017. Radyo Pilipinas's overseas counterpart (DZRP), which originally used the brand since the 1990s, remained on air but added "Worldwide" to avert confusion.

On May 5, 2018, Radyo Pilipinas' "TeleRadyo"-formatted video streaming channel began its simulcast over People's Television Network (PTV) nationwide and also streamed live via PTV's official Facebook account, with programs such as Cabinet Report sa TeleRadyo (airing every Friday) and Tutok Erwin Tulfo (airing from Mondays to Fridays). However, a few weeks later, both programs were cancelled in favor of infomercial programming as a preparation for the launch of Chinese TV programs on PTV until it was eventually cancelled in 2019. However, its TeleRadyo Channel resumed on September 13, 2023, replacing Salaam TV on PTV digital subchannel.

Under the new PBS Director-General Fernando "Dindo" Amparo Sanga, since September 2024, Radyo Pilipinas has rebranded its sub-brand as Radyo Pilipinas - Radyo Publiko on December 31, 2024 (New Year's Eve). Minor schedule changes and the launching of new programs began on January 6, 2025.

From February 17, 2025, its sister station 104.3 The Capital began simulcasting selected news programming from Radyo Pilipinas - Radyo Publiko, along with content from sister stations Sports Radio and Radyo Magasin. From July 6, 2026, Radyo Pilipinas - Radyo Publiko went off air due to technical adjustments of its transmitter.

== Platform ==
As the government's flagship radio station, it serves as a medium of development communication, a conduit between the government and the people, aiming to mobilize all sectors of society towards development and nationalism; the station features live, up-to-the-minute government news, live coverages of press conferences, as well as relevant information from different government sectors.

== Notable on-air personalities ==
=== Current ===
- Precious Hipolito Castelo

=== Former ===
- Erwin Tulfo
- Ben Tulfo
- Alex Santos

== See also ==
- DWGT-TV
- People's Television Network
