= Radyo Pilipinas World Service =

Radyo Pilipinas World Service (DZRP)
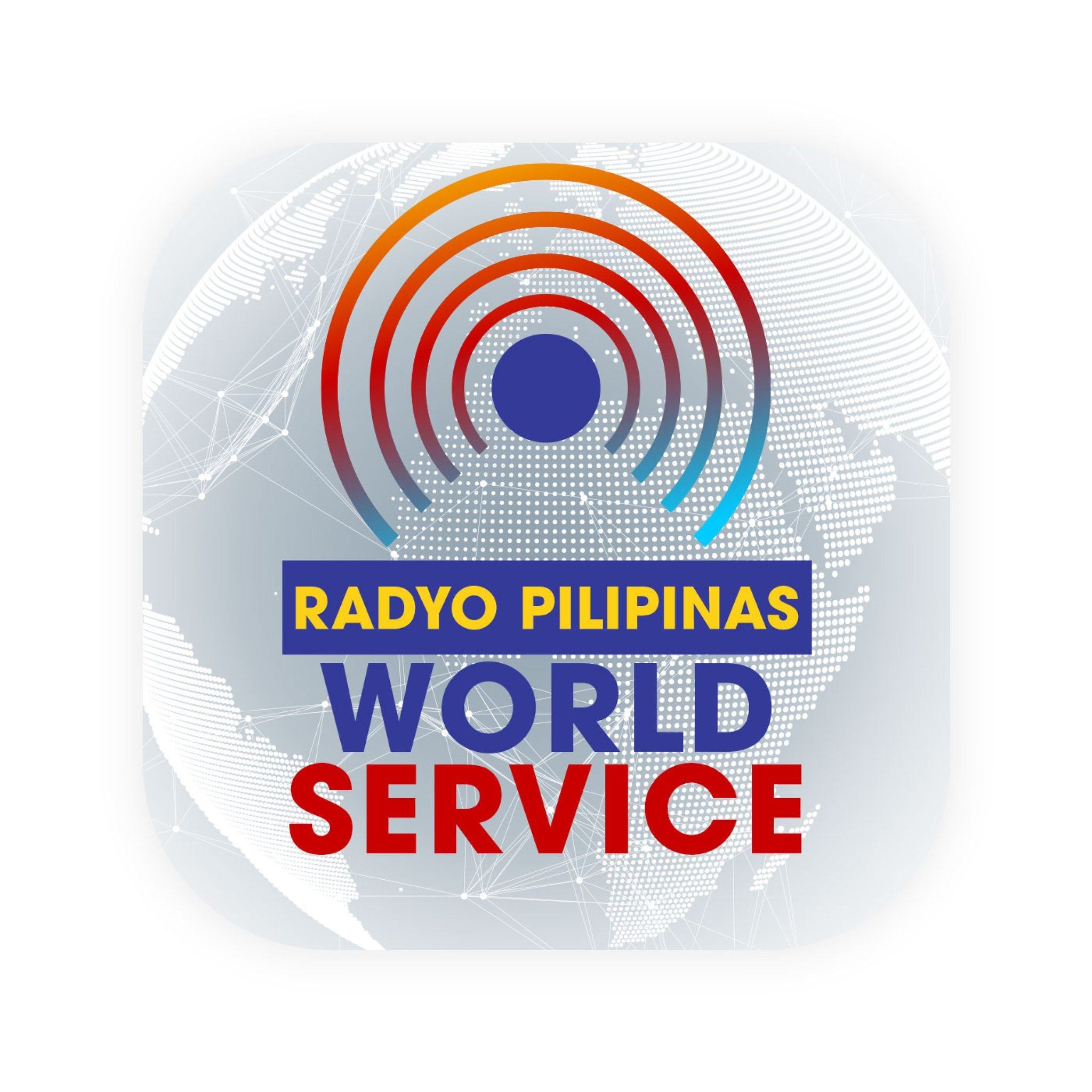
- Quezon City; Philippines
- Broadcast area: International
- Frequency: See list
- Branding: Radyo Pilipinas World Service (Radio Philippines)

Programming
- Format: News, Talk

Ownership
- Owner: Presidential Broadcast Service
- Sister stations: Radyo Publiko, Sports Radio, Radyo Magasin, Republika ni Juan, The Capital

History
- First air date: 1972
- Former names: Voice of the Philippines; Radyo Pagasa
- Former frequencies: AM: 920 kHz (1972–1978); SW: 9.810 MHz (1970s)
- Call sign meaning: Radyo Pilipinas; Republic of the Philippines

Technical information
- Power: 250,000 watts

Links
- Webcast: Listen live (via TuneIn)
- Website: radyopilipinas.ph/WorldService

DZRP, broadcasting as Radyo Pilipinas World Service, is a shortwave radio station broadcasting outside the Philippines. Owned by the Presidential Broadcast Service under the Presidential Communications Group, the station is operated from Mondays to Sundays 1:30 AM to 11:30 AM PHT (17:30-03:30 UTC) on various shortwave frequencies, with internet live streaming across all schedules. It broadcasts in Filipino and English languages. Radyo Pilipinas World Service uses the relay transmitter facilities of Voice of America in Tinang, Concepcion, Tarlac Province for its broadcast purposes.

As PBS made a rebranding of its flagship network Radyo ng Bayan and station DZSR into Radyo Pilipinas by 2017, the shortwave station remains unchanged but added "Worldwide" (later "World Service") to its name to avert confusion.

== History ==
During the Martial Law era, the National Media Production Center (NMPC) operated its own station Voice of the Philippines (VOP) on 2 frequencies: 920 kHz on AM, and 9.81 MHz on shortwave.

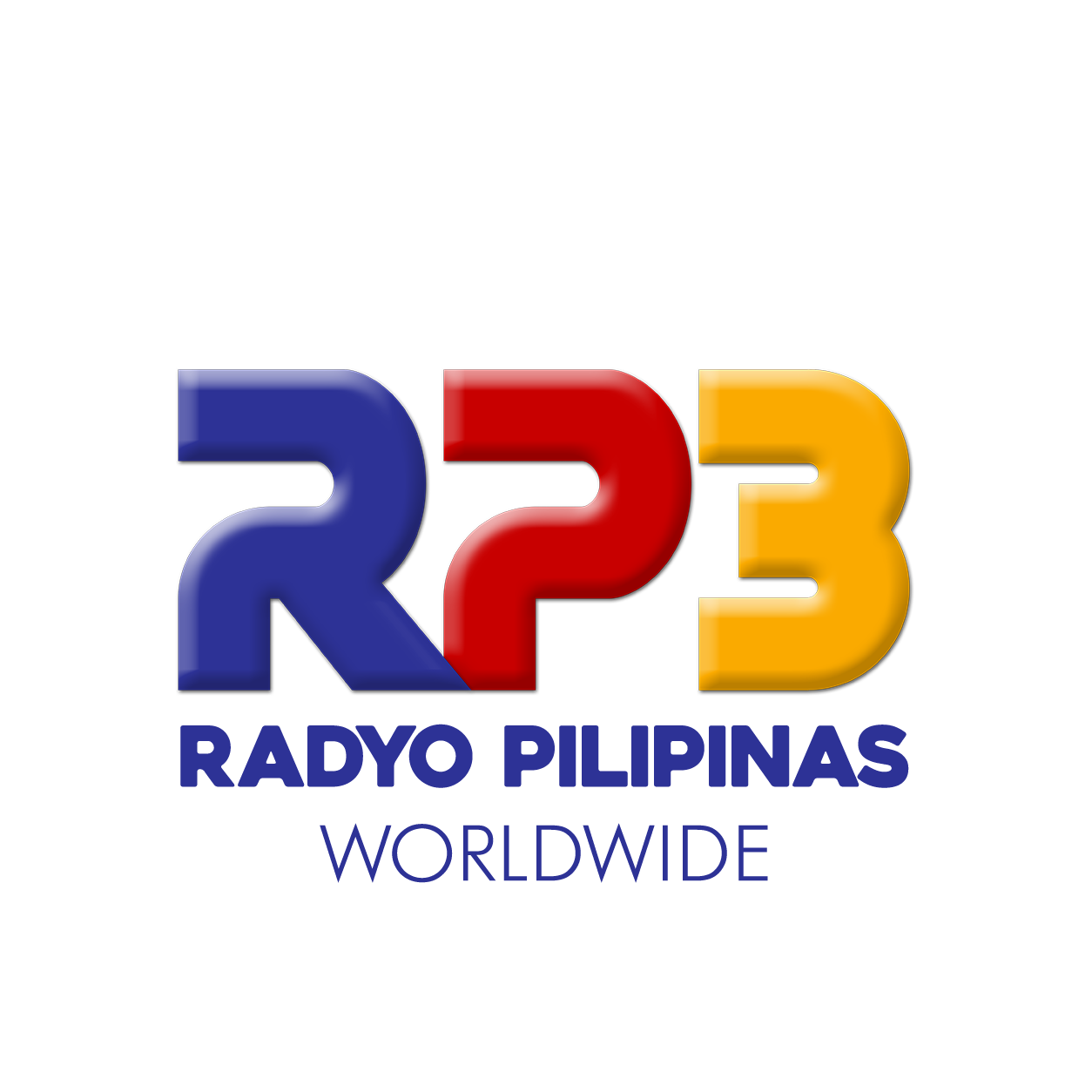
Logo from 2020 to 2022. The latter (RP3) was later reused for 1278kHz's branding.

After EDSA Revolution in 1986, the NMPC and Bureau of Broadcasts (BB) were abolished, led to its stations (including VOP) were reassigned to the newly reinstated PBS. VOP was later rebranded as Radyo Pagasa until in 1987 when the station became Radyo Pilipinas under its own callsign DZRP.

== Available time and frequencies ==
As of June 2026, Radyo Pilipinas World Service is available on the following times (schedule and shortwave frequencies may changed without prior notice):

Language	Time (UTC)	Time (PHT)	Frequencies (Shortwave)	Coverage
Filipino Service	17:30 - 19:30	01:30 - 03:30	9.370 MHz, 9.935 MHz, 12.120 MHz	Japan, Russia, China, India, Southeast Asia, Europe, Middle East and Northern Africa
English Service	02:00 - 03:30	10:00 - 11:30	15.640 MHz, 17.750 MHz, 21.720 MHz	Japan, Russia, China, India, Southeast Asia, Europe, Middle East and Northern Africa

Radyo Pilipinas' programs can also be heard via live audio streaming in the internet from 11:30pm to noon of the next day PHT.

== See also ==
- Presidential Broadcast Service
- Radyo Pilipinas
