= DZSR =

Radio station in Metro Manila, Philippines

Sports Radio (DZSR)
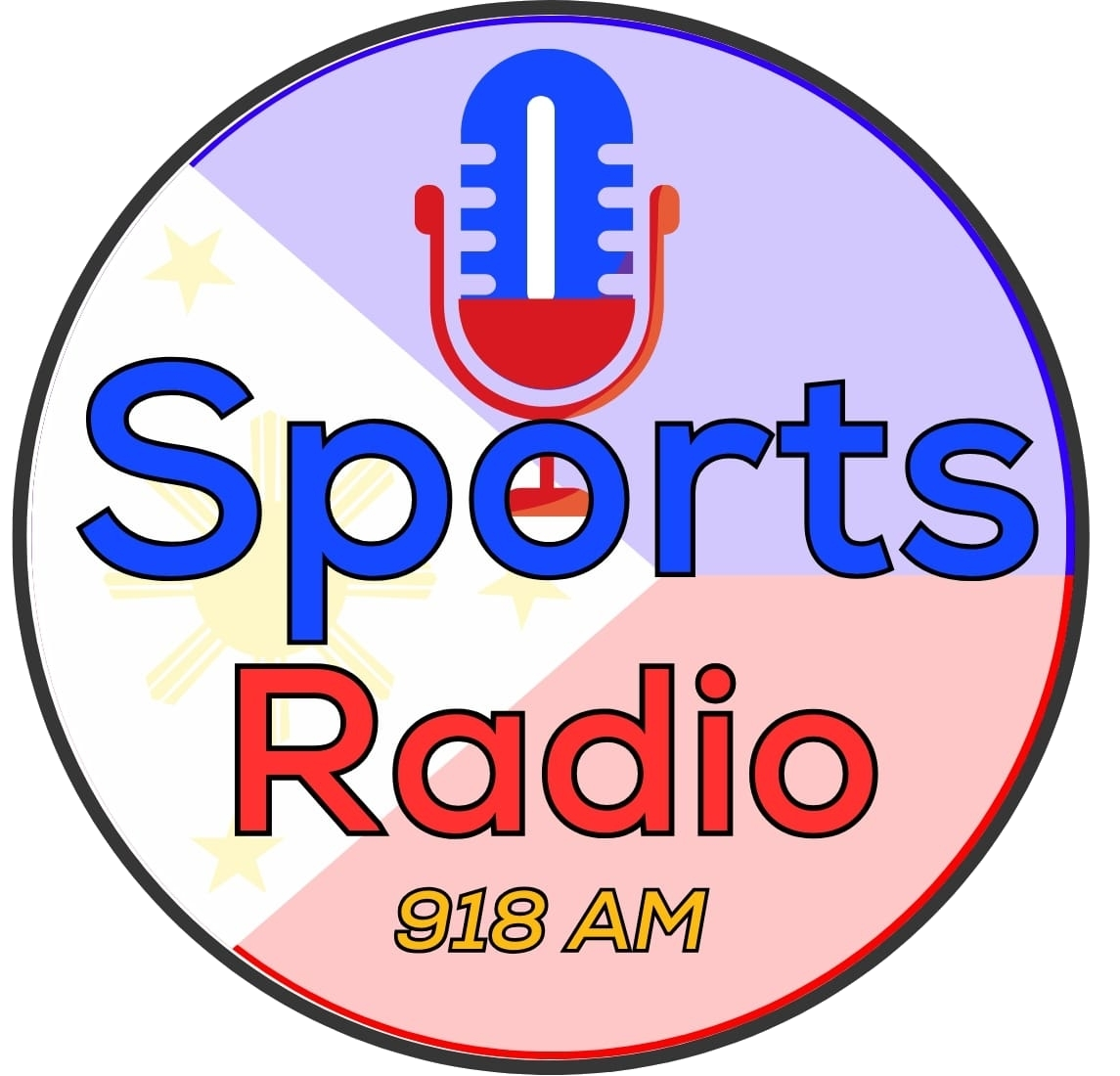
- Quezon City; Philippines
- Broadcast area: Metro Manila and surrounding areas
- Frequency: 918 kHz
- Branding: Sports Radio

Programming
- Languages: Filipino, English
- Format: Sports, Talk
- Network: Radyo Pilipinas

Ownership
- Owner: Presidential Broadcast Service
- Sister stations: Radyo Pilipinas - Radyo Publiko; Radyo Magasin; 87.5 Republika ni Juan; 104.3 The Capital; Radyo Pilipinas World Service; PTV 4

History
- First air date: 1971
- Former call signs: DZRP (1978–1986); DZRB (1986–1996); DWSY (2010)
- Former names: Radyo Maynila; SportsCenter; Sports and Youth Radio; Radyo Pilipinas 2 Sports
- Former frequencies: 960 kHz (1973–1978); 738 kHz (1978–1996)
- Call sign meaning: Sports Radio

Technical information
- Licensing authority: NTC
- Class: A (clear frequency)
- Power: 10,000 watts

Links
- Webcast: Radyo Pilipinas 2 LIVE Audio
- Website: radyopilipinas.ph/sportsradio918/ PBS

DZSR (918 AM), broadcasting as Sports Radio, is a radio station owned and operated by the Presidential Broadcast Service, an attached agency under the Presidential Communications Office. The station's studio is located at the 4th floor, Media Center Building, Visayas Avenue, Barangay Vasra, Diliman, Quezon City, and its transmitter is located at MacArthur Highway, Barangay Dakila, Malolos, Bulacan. The station operates from Monday to Friday at 5:00 AM to 8:00 PM and weekends at 5:00 AM to 7:00 PM.

As the country's first radio station dedicated to sports, Sports Radio's programming grid is 70% sports content and 30% news, informative, and lifestyle programming.

== History ==
Sports Radio logo (1996–2017)

DZSR first went on air as DPI Radyo 2 / DPI Radyo Maynila during the dictatorship of Ferdinand Marcos.

On May 10, 1986, Sports Radio (first known as DZSR SportsCenter 738) was established under the leadership of former actor Jose Mari Gonzales who took over as the Interim Director of the Bureau of Broadcast Services (former name of PBS). Gonzales ordered that all BBS radio stations have respective identities and target listeners including Radyo ng Bayan (918 kHz), Radyo Maynila (1278 kHz) and DZRP-Radyo Pagasa on shortwave. DZFM was converted at that time as a news and information station covering sports developments in the country.

Before taking on the sports radio format fulltime, the division was named "Radio Sports' after the on-air segment broadcast on DZFM. Reynaldo "Dado" Roa was its first station manager, and the first staff of DZFM was composed of sports writers and reporters from the Radio Sports department and radio newscasters. DZFM changed call letters to DZSR on 738 kHz but reversed course as a courtesy to the original owner of the frequency, Frederick Marquardt, an American national who donated the 738 kHz frequency to the Philippine government.

On January 2, 1995, Sports Radio's frequency was moved from 738 kHz (now occupied by Radyo ng Bayan) to 918 kHz and changed their call letters back to DZSR under Memorandum Order No. 329. (Presidential Order No. 293) On March 1, 1996, 5 years after Marquardt's death.

On February 1, 2010, DZSR changed its callsign to DWSY (wherein the "SY" means Sports & Youth), as they expanded their programming from sports-related shows to youth-oriented programs. The youth programs of DWSY named "Youth Service" aired on Saturdays. On December 31, 2010, its call letters reverted to DZSR.

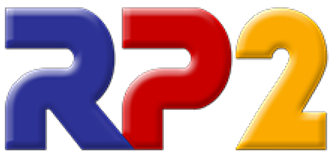
Logo of Radyo Pilipinas 2 from 2017 to 2023.

On September 18, 2017, Sports Radio was rebranded as Radyo Pilipinas 2, merging its programming with Radyo Magasin, which was shut down the previous day. The latter's former frequency was revived in 2020 as a DepEd TV simulcast and became Radyo Pilipinas 3 (RP3 Alert) in 2023, but then returned once more as the aforementioned above branding in January 2025.

In March 2020, Radyo Pilipinas 2 temporarily went off-the-air amid the community quarantine imposed in Metro Manila due to COVID-19.

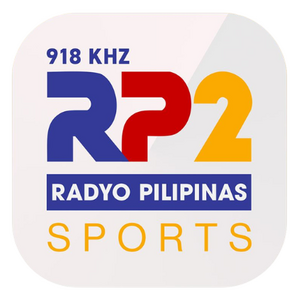
Logo of Radyo Pilipinas 2 - Sports from 2023 to 2025.

On March 7, 2022, Radyo Pilipinas 2 returned on air, with reduced power of 10,000 watts.

In January 2023, Radyo Pilipinas 2 acquired the rights to cover the Philippine Basketball Association on air. It is also simulcast on with selected Radyo Pilipinas provincial stations.

At 1:00 pm on November 28, 2025, following its simulcast of PTV's Bagong Pilipinas Ngayon, DZSR relaunched the Sports Radio brand, replacing Radyo Pilipinas 2. The station showed an audiovisual presentation about its history and its impact in the Philippine radio broadcasting and sports industries, followed by the inaugural program hosted by Cecille Quimlat and Judith Caringal.

== See also ==
- DWGT-TV
- People's Television Network
