= DWFT =

Radio station in Metro Manila, Philippines

Capital 104.3 (DWFT)
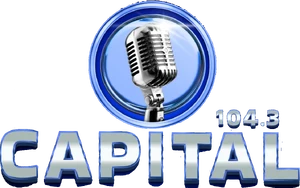
- Quezon City; Philippines
- Broadcast area: Mega Manila and surrounding areas
- Frequency: 104.3 MHz
- RDS: DWFT-FM2
- Branding: Capital 104.3

Programming
- Languages: Filipino, English
- Format: Adult Contemporary, News, Talk
- Affiliations: Radyo Pilipinas - Radyo Publiko 738; Sports Radio 918; Radyo Magasin 1278; Radyo Pilipinas World Service (selected news programming); PTV (for Ulat Bayan)

Ownership
- Owner: Presidential Broadcast Service
- Sister stations: Radyo Pilipinas - Radyo Publiko; Sports Radio; Radyo Magasin; Republika ni Juan; Radyo Pilipinas World Service

History
- First air date: March 18, 1980
- Former call signs: DWIM (1979-1986); DWBR (1986-2017)
- Former names: DWBR/Business Radio (1986–2017); FM2 (2017–2020); Capital FM2 (2020–2024)
- Former frequencies: 103.5 MHz (1979–1986)
- Call sign meaning: FM Two (former branding)

Technical information
- Licensing authority: NTC
- Class: A, B, upper C
- Power: 25,000 watts
- ERP: 60,000 watts

Links
- Webcast: Listen Live

DWFT (104.3 FM), broadcasting as Capital 104.3, is a radio station owned and operated by the Presidential Broadcast Service, the broadcast arm of the Presidential Communications Office. Its studios and transmitter are located at the 4th Floor, Philippine Information Agency Building, Visayas Avenue, Quezon City.

== History ==
=== 1980-1986: DWIM ===
DWBR started in 1980 as DWIM (then at 103.5 MHz) under the National Media Production Center, headquartered at the Philcomcen Tower in Pasig before moving to Broadcast Plaza (now ABS-CBN Broadcasting Center) in Bohol Avenue (now Sgt. Esguerra Avenue), and then later moved again to its present location at the Government Information and Media Center Building in Visayas Avenue, Quezon City. The station served music and news daily from 5 AM to midnight. Newscasters around that time were Jess Decolongan, Don Lee, and Bong Lapira. Other voices of DWIM included Babs Peña and Manny Freires.

=== 1986-2017: DWBR ===
DWBR 104.3 from 1986 to 2017

It became DWBR (and moved to the current frequency at 104.3 MHz) in 1986, after the People Power Revolution. The station held the tagline: Weaving Beautiful Rhythms. It played old standards music, from the big band era to the Broadway era, playing songs from the 40s to 70s.

In early 1990s, it adopted the brand Business Radio, albeit retaining its music format. Since that time, it covered the latest business stories and issues in the Philippines with its coverage of the Philippine stock market. It also aired various talk programs that discusses relevant matters concerning business, the environment.

It was managed by its active manager Ms. Ma. Julita "Maju" E. Ramos. Regular newscasters included Bon Vibar, Cheryl Buenaventura-Ayuste, Rouella Santos, Alel Auxillos, Shirly Semic, and Edwin Santos. Other voices heard on the station were Manny Carvajal, Fred Patrick, Santi Bautista, Camille Victoria, Dean Bernardo, and George Boone.

In 2014, Broadcaster's Bureau, a weekday morning show, was replaced with Fresh, which played a mix of retro & current music hosted by veteran DJ George Boone.

Business Radio used to operate from 6 am to 10 pm daily, similar to its sister stations DZSR and DZRM.

=== 2017-present: FM2/Capital ===
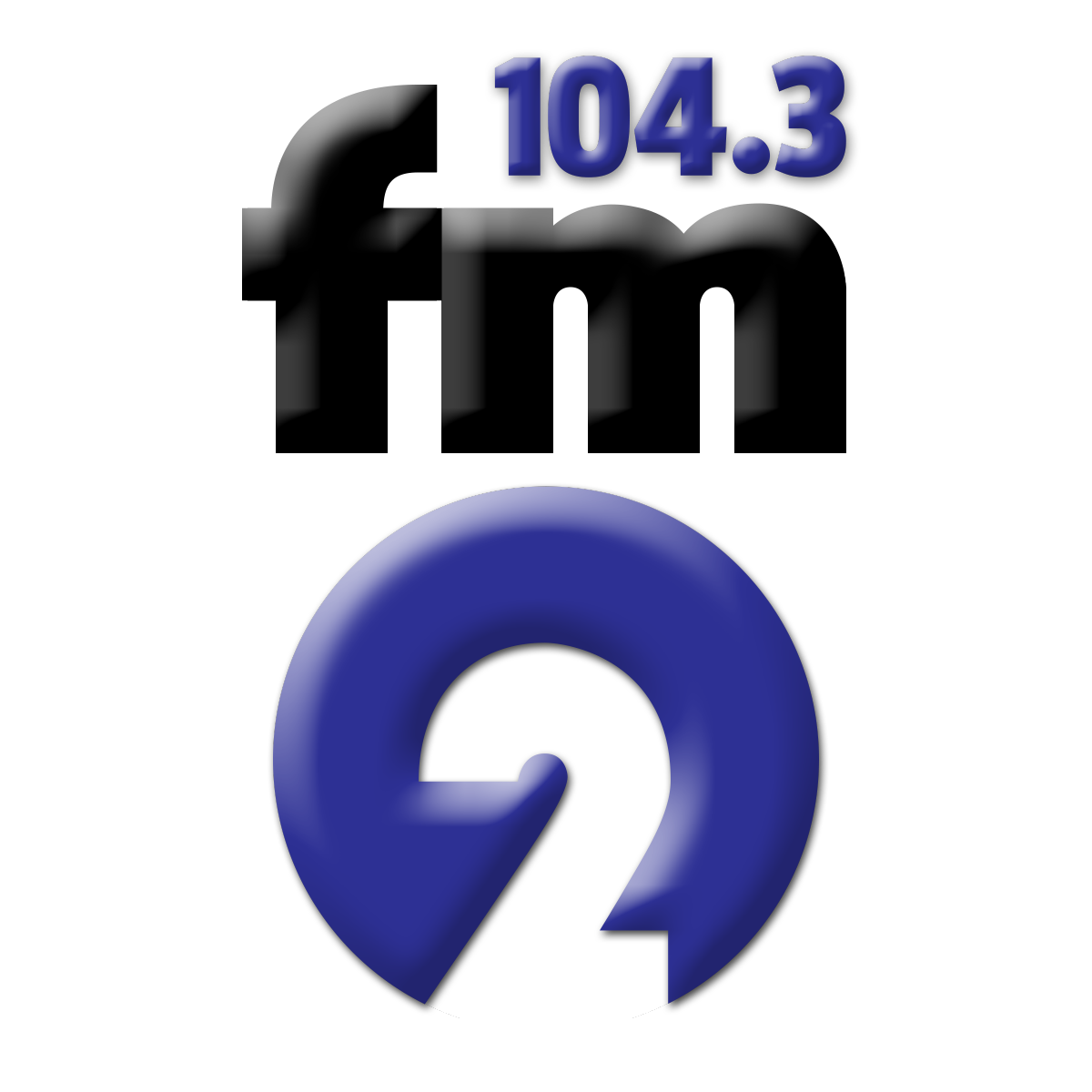
104.3 FM2 from 2017 to 2024

In late-2016, PBS announced that Business Radio will have its name change. First announced as "Radio 2", it was later changed to FM2 to avoid confusion with BBC Radio 2 in the United Kingdom, with the launch date set on February 2, 2017. Prior to this announcement, radio veteran Rizal "Bong" Aportadera Jr. (Sonny B) was appointed by former PCO Sec. Martin Andanar as the Director of PBS in July 2016. A month later, Carlo Villo (Carlo José) was then appointed by Aportadera as the agency's Deputy Director and head of the new FM division. Villo serves as the program director for 104.3 FM, as well as its recently acquired 87.5 FM.

On January 15, 2017, Business Radio quietly signed off for the last time and went off the air for a week. On January 24, 2017, the station went on air for test broadcast playing the '80s and '90s music along with pre-recorded teasers carrying the New Republic tagline. Sonny B, Carlo José and George Boone had their warm-up 3 days after its test broadcast.

On February 2, 2017, past 5:30 am, DWBR signed on as 1043 FM2. At that time, it extended its broadcast time by two hours, broadcasting until midnight. Its playlist focuses heavily on the 80s and 90s, with a tiny portion of 70s. Since summer of 2017, FM2 signs on an hour earlier.

In almost 9 months under the new format and for the first time in the history of government radio, 1043 FM2 was ranked by Nielsen as the #1 station in the Niche (A, B, and upper C) market.

On December 11, 2017, PBS retired its old callsign DWBR in favor of DWFT as it appeared on its website and now being used on sign-on and sign-off notices. The said callsign change is made to reflect the new branding, serving as complement to the newly launched sister station 87.5 FM1.

Started from August 2, 2019, FM2 began plays the music of 2000s with a new show Friday Y2K. Since then, music from the 2000s and 10 years behind the current year is integrated to its regular playlist. The said program was axed in late June 2022.

On February 3, 2020, the station was renamed as Capital FM2.

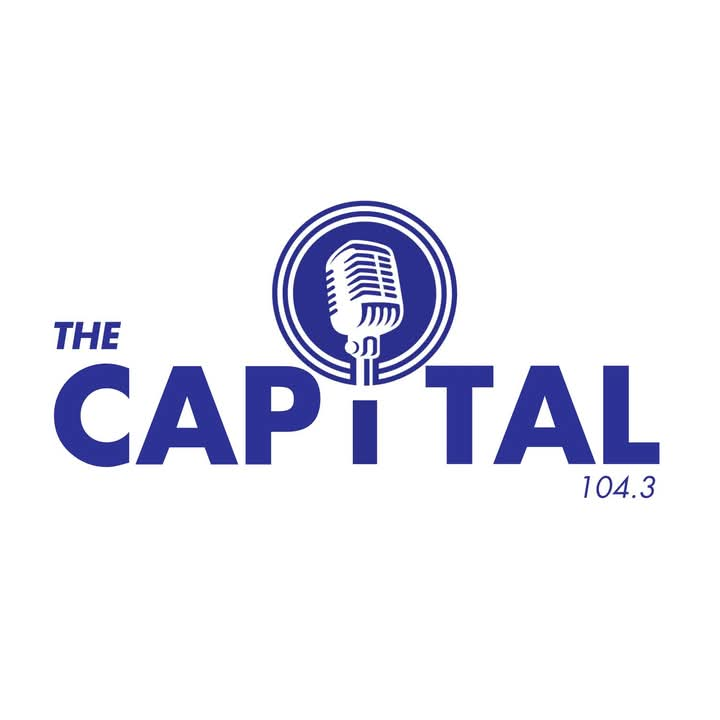
Logo from 2022 to 2025.

Under the new PBS director general Fernando "Dindo" Amparo Sanga, by September 2024, the FM2 branding was dropped. By this time, the station began simulcasting PTV's Ulat Bayan newscast.

On February 17, 2025, The Capital began simulcasting selected morning programs from its sister station Radyo Pilipinas - Radyo Publiko 738, while retaining its music programming during the rest of the broadcast day. On January 1, 2026, it began simulcasting most of the afternoon programs of Radyo Pilipinas, as well as the 1pm timeslot of Radyo Magasin 1278 and the nightcap of Sports Radio 918's Sports News Roundup. Its automated music programming was retained during weeknights and weekends. From July 6, 2026, Radyo Pilipinas - Radyo Publiko will fully transfer to 104.3 FM due to technical adjustments of AM 738 kHz.
