= Catholic Media Network =

Philippine radio network

Catholic Media Network (CMN)
- Formerly: Philippine Federation of Catholic Broadcasters (PFCB)
- Type: Private
- Industry: Radio broadcasting
- Founded: 1997
- Headquarters: Unit 201 Sunrise Condominium, #226 Ortigas Ave., North Greenhills, San Juan City, Philippines
- Key people: Fr. Francis Lucas (President)
- Owner: Catholic Bishops' Conference of the Philippines (CBCP)
- Website: www.catholicmedianetwork.com

Catholic Media Network, also known as CMN, is a Catholic radio network in the Philippines. CMN serves as the broadcasting arm of the Catholic Bishops' Conference of the Philippines, the governing body of the Roman Catholic Church in the Philippines.

== History ==
CMN was known as the Philippine Federation of Catholic Broadcasters (PFCB), a radio network founded through the efforts of Fr. James Reuter, SJ and Fr. George Dion, OMI in 1966. The radio network was owned and operated by different Catholic broadcast media corporations.

In 1997, the name was changed to the Catholic Media Network to suit the network's mission and also the new slogan "The Spirit of The Philippines".

In October 2017, the House of Representatives threatened not to renew the 25-year franchise of the CBCP's broadcast radio operations (including some of the CMN member stations), citing criticism on the Duterte administration over war on drugs. However, CMN's de facto flagship station DZRV, was not part of it as it is operated by CBCP's affiliate Global Broadcasting System, which its franchise was already renewed by the Aquino administration a year earlier.

Eventually, in July 2019, CBCP broadcast franchise was renewed for 25 years after its respective bill was lapsed into law as President Rodrigo Duterte did not sign it within the period set by the Constitution.

== Content ==
CMN content varies depending on the station from which it is being broadcast. Stations broadcast news, sports, radio drama, and other programs. As a network, CMN's mission statement is to use community-based broadcasting to promote New Evangelization and human development. Content is anti-abortion, catholic, and community oriented.

== Stations ==
CMN has 54 radio stations across the Philippines and its broadcasts reach 11 regions and 35 provinces. It is the largest broadcaster in the Philippines, in terms of total number of stations and transmitting power per station.

Most of its stations are operated by their respective dioceses either through CBCP or their dioceses' own media arms. These stations, along with its diocesan licensees and affiliates, form the network chain and these individual stations credit their promotions as "members of" and not "owned by" CMN.

=== AM stations ===
CMN's AM stations are grouped as Radyo Totoo (Tagalog, “Radio True”), with the exception of DWAL in Batangas. Several provincial stations have their own local branding other than Radyo Totoo.

Branding	Callsign	Frequency	Location	Owner
Veritas 846 (Note: Owned by Global Broadcasting System.)	DZRV	846 kHz	Mega Manila	Archdiocese of Manila
Radyo Totoo Laoag	DZEA	909 kHz	Laoag	Diocese of Laoag
Radyo Totoo Vigan	DZNS	963 kHz	Vigan	Archdiocese of Nueva Segovia
Radyo Totoo Abra	DZPA	873 kHz	Bangued	Abra Community Broadcasting Corporation
Radyo Totoo Baguio	DZWT	540 kHz	Baguio	Mountain Province Broadcasting Corporation
Radyo Totoo Alaminos	DZWM	864 kHz	Alaminos	Alaminos Community Broadcasting Corporation
Radyo Veritas Nueva Vizcaya	DWRV	1233 kHz	Bayombong	Diocese of Bayombong
Radyo Totoo Mindoro	DZVT	1395 kHz	San Jose	Apostolic Vicariate of San Jose in Mindoro
Radyo Veritas Legazpi	DWBS	1008 kHz	Legaspi	Diocesan Multi-Media Services, Inc.
Ang Dios Gugma Radio	DYDA	1053 kHz	Iloilo City	Ang Dios Gugma Catholic Ministries
Radyo Totoo Bacolod	DYAF	1143 kHz	Bacolod	Diocese of Bacolod
Radyo Totoo Antique	DYKA	801 kHz	San Jose	Kauswagan Broadcasting Corporation
Radio Fuerza	DYRF	1215 kHz	Cebu	Word Broadcasting Corporation
DYDM	DYDM	1548 kHz	Maasin	Diocese of Maasin
DYVW	DYVW	1368 kHz	Borongan	Voice of the Word Media Network
Radyo Verdadero Zamboanga	DXVP	1467 kHz	Zamboanga	Archdiocese of Zamboanga
Radyo Totoo Malaybalay	DXDB	594 kHz	Malaybalay	Diocese of Malaybalay
Radyo Kampana	DXDD	657 kHz	Ozamiz	Dan-ag sa Dakbayan Broadcasting Corporation
Heart of Mary	DXHM	549 kHz	Mati	Diocese of Mati
Radyo Totoo General Santos	DXCP	585 kHz	General Santos	South Cotabato Communications Corporation
Radyo Bida Koronadal	DXOM	963 kHz	Koronadal	Notre Dame Broadcasting Corporation
Radyo Bida Kidapawan	DXND	747 kHz	Kidapawan	Notre Dame Broadcasting Corporation
Radyo Bida Cotabato	DXMS	882 kHz	Cotabato	Notre Dame Broadcasting Corporation
DXMM	DXMM	927 kHz	Jolo	Sulu Tawi-Tawi Broadcasting Foundation

=== FM stations ===
CMN's FM stations are grouped as Spirit FM, and prior to 1997, these had unique local branding. A majority of these stations carry a hybrid of masa and religious content while some carry their own music formats (whether religious, Top 40, or country), with a few functioning as overflow stations for their AM sisters. Similar to its sister AM network, some FM stations still operate under local identities other than the Spirit FM branding.

Branding	Callsign	Frequency	Location	Owner
Spirit FM Abra	DWWM	96.9 MHz	Bangued	Abra Community Broadcasting Corporation
99.9 Country	DZWR	99.9 MHz	Baguio	Mountain Province Broadcasting Corporation
Spirit FM Alaminos	DWTJ	99.3 MHz	Alaminos	Alaminos Community Broadcasting Corporation
Manaoag Dominican Radio	—N/a	102.7 MHz	Manaoag	Our Lady of Manaoag
Radio Maria	DZRM	99.7 MHz	Tarlac City	Radio Maria Philippines
Radio Maria	DZRD	101.5 MHz	Tuguegarao	Radio Maria Philippines
Radio Maria	DZRC	102.1 MHz	Santiago	Radio Maria Philippines
Radio Maria	DWCX	95.9 MHz	Olongapo	Radio Maria Philippines
Spirit FM Bayombong	DZRV	90.1 MHz	Bayombong	Diocese of Bayombong
Bright FM	DWBL	91.9 MHz	San Fernando	Archdiocese of San Fernando
Spirit FM Baler	DZJO	101.7 MHz	Baler	Territorial Prelature of Infanta
Spirit FM Batangas	DWAM	99.1 MHz	Batangas	Radyo Bayanihan System
Radyo Totoo Batangas	DWAL	95.9 MHz	Batangas	Radyo Bayanihan System
Spirit FM Lucena	DWVM	103.9 MHz	Lucena	Diocese of Lucena
Spirit FM Gumaca	DWDG	91.7 MHz	Gumaca	Diocese of Gumaca
Spirit FM Infanta	DWJO	92.7 MHz	Infanta	Territorial Prelature of Infanta
Spirit FM Calapan	DZSB	104.1 MHz	Calapan	Diocese of Calapan
Spirit FM Occidental Mindoro	DZVT	93.7 MHz	San Jose	Apostolic Vicariate of San Jose in Mindoro
Spirit FM Legazpi	DWCZ	94.7 MHz	Legazpi	Diocesan Multi-Media Services, Inc.
The Mother's Touch	DWRV	98.3 MHz	Naga	Archdiocese of Cáceres
Spirit FM Sorsogon	DZGN	102.3 MHz	Sorsogon City	Good News Sorsogon Foundation
Spirit FM Masbate	DZIM	98.3 MHz	Masbate City	Diocese of Masbate
XFM Iloilo (Note: Operated by Y2H Broadcasting Network.)	DYOZ	100.7 MHz	Iloilo	Global Broadcasting System
Spirit FM Calinog	DYMI	94.7 MHz	Calinog	Archdiocese of Jaro
Spirit FM Antique	DYKA	94.1 MHz	San Jose	Kauswagan Broadcasting Corporation
Spirit FM Roxas	DYCW	88.1 MHz	Roxas City	Archdiocese of Capiz
Juander Radyo Cebu (Note: Operated by RSV Broadcasting Network.)	DYDW	89.1 MHz	Cebu City	Word Broadcasting Corporation
Juander Radyo Ormoc	DYAJ	90.3 MHz	Ormoc	Word Broadcasting Corporation
Marian Radio	PA	91.9 MHz	Cagayan de Oro	Archdiocese of Cagayan de Oro
Cool Radio	DXDD	100.7 MHz	Ozamiz	Dan-ag sa Dakbayan Broadcasting Corporation
Spirit FM Davao	DXGN	89.9 MHz	Davao City	Davao Verbum Dei Media Foundation, Inc.
Spirit FM Mati	DXDV	97.5 MHz	Mati	Diocese of Mati
Happy FM Koronadal	DXOM	91.7 MHz	Koronadal	Notre Dame Broadcasting Corporation
Happy FM Kidapawan	DXDM	88.7 MHz	Kidapawan	Notre Dame Broadcasting Corporation
Happy FM Cotabato	DXOL	92.7 MHz	Cotabato City	Notre Dame Broadcasting Corporation
Radyo Magbalantay	—N/a	98.1 MHz	Surigao	Silangan Broadcasting Corporation
Unitas Radio	DXMW	103.1 MHz	Tandag	Diocese of Tandag

== Notable diocesan/regional licensees and affiliates ==
- Notre Dame Broadcasting Corporation (Cotabato - Oblates of Mary Immaculate)
- Word Broadcasting Corporation (Cebu - Society of the Divine Word)
- Global Broadcasting System (Manila - Archdiocese of Manila)
- Radio Maria Philippines (Northern Luzon - Radio Maria)

== International affiliations ==
- EWTN Global Catholic Radio
- The World Family of Radio Maria
