= 909 (disambiguation) =

909 may refer to:

- 909, a year in the 10th century
- 909 AM, an AM radio frequency
- Area code 909 in the United States

== Highways ==
- Florida State Road 909
- Maryland Route 909
- Saskatchewan Highway 909, in Canada
- for others see List of highways numbered 909

== Military ==
- 909th Air Refueling Squadron, part of the United States Air Force
- Kosmos 909, a former Russian satellite
- Nine-O-Nine, a former Boeing B-17G Flying Fortress (S/N 42-31909)
- Type 909 weapon trials ship, a class of ships used by the People's Republic of China
- USS LST-909, a former ship of the United States Navy

== Music ==
- "One After 909", a song by the Beatles
- "Revolution 909", a single by Daft Punk
- Roland TR-909, a drum machine

== Other ==
- Aeroflot Flight 909, a 1976 plane crash
- CEA-909, an ANSI standard for smart antennas
- Porsche 909 Bergspyder, a 1968 sports car
- United Nations Security Council Resolution 909, a 1994 resolution pertaining to Rwanda
