= DXOM =

DXOM is the callsign of Notre Dame Broadcasting Corporation's two stations in Koronadal:

- DXOM-AM, branded as Radyo Bida
- DXOM-FM, branded as Happy FM
