= DZVT =

DZVT is the callsign of Apostolic Vicariate of San Jose in Mindoro's two stations:

- DZVT-AM, branded as Radyo Totoo
- DZVT-FM, branded as Spirit FM
