= DYKA =

DYKA may refer to Kauswagan Broadcasting Corporation's two stations in San Jose de Buenavista:

- DYKA-AM, an AM radio station branded as Radyo Totoo
- DYKA-FM, an FM radio station branded as Spirit FM
