= DWRV =

DWRV may refer to:

- DWRV-AM, an AM radio station broadcasting in Bayombong, branded as Radyo Veritas
- DWRV-FM, an FM radio station broadcasting in Naga, branded as Radio Caritas Mariae
