= DXDD =

DXDD is the callsign of Dan-ag sa Dakbayan Broadcasting Network's two stations in Ozamiz:

- DXDD-AM, branded as Radyo Kampana
- DXDD-FM, branded as Cool Radio
