= DZPA-AM =

Philippine radio station

DZPA
- Bangued; Philippines
- Broadcast area: Abra, parts of Ilocos Norte and Ilocos Sur
- Frequency: 873 kHz
- Branding: DZPA 873

Programming
- Languages: Ilocano, Filipino
- Format: News, Public Affairs, Talk, Religious Radio
- Affiliations: Catholic Media Network

Ownership
- Owner: Abra Community Broadcasting Corporation
- Sister stations: 96.9 Spirit FM

History
- First air date: February 1, 1970
- Former frequencies: 880 kHz (1970–1978)
- Call sign meaning: Puso ti Abra

Technical information
- Licensing authority: NTC
- Class: CDE
- Power: 5,000 watts

Links
- Webcast: Listen live
- Website: https://dzpa873.webs.com/

DZPA (873 AM) is a radio station owned and operated by Abra Community Broadcasting Corporation, the media arm of the Diocese of Bangued. Its studios are located at the Ground Floor, DZPA Bldg., Rizal St. cor Zamora St., Brgy. Poblacion, Bangued, Abra.
