= DZEA =

DZEA may refer to:

- DZEA-AM, an AM radio station broadcasting in Laoag, branded as Radyo Totoo
- DZEA-TV, a television station broadcasting in Benguet, branded as GMA
