= DWWM =

Philippine radio station

Spirit FM Abra (DWWM)
- Bangued; Philippines
- Broadcast area: Abra, parts of Ilocos Norte and Ilocos Sur
- Frequency: 96.9 MHz
- Branding: 96.9 Spirit FM

Programming
- Languages: Ilocano, Filipino
- Format: Religious Radio
- Affiliations: Catholic Media Network

Ownership
- Owner: Abra Community Broadcasting Corporation
- Sister stations: DZPA 873

History
- First air date: 1987
- Call sign meaning: We Work for Mary

Technical information
- Licensing authority: NTC
- Power: 5,000 watts

DWWM (96.9 FM), broadcasting as 96.9 Spirit FM, is a radio station owned and operated by Abra Community Broadcasting Corporation, the media arm of the Diocese of Bangued. Its studios are located at the Ground Floor, DZPA Bldg., Rizal St. cor Zamora St., Brgy. Poblacion, Bangued.
