= Tebourba =

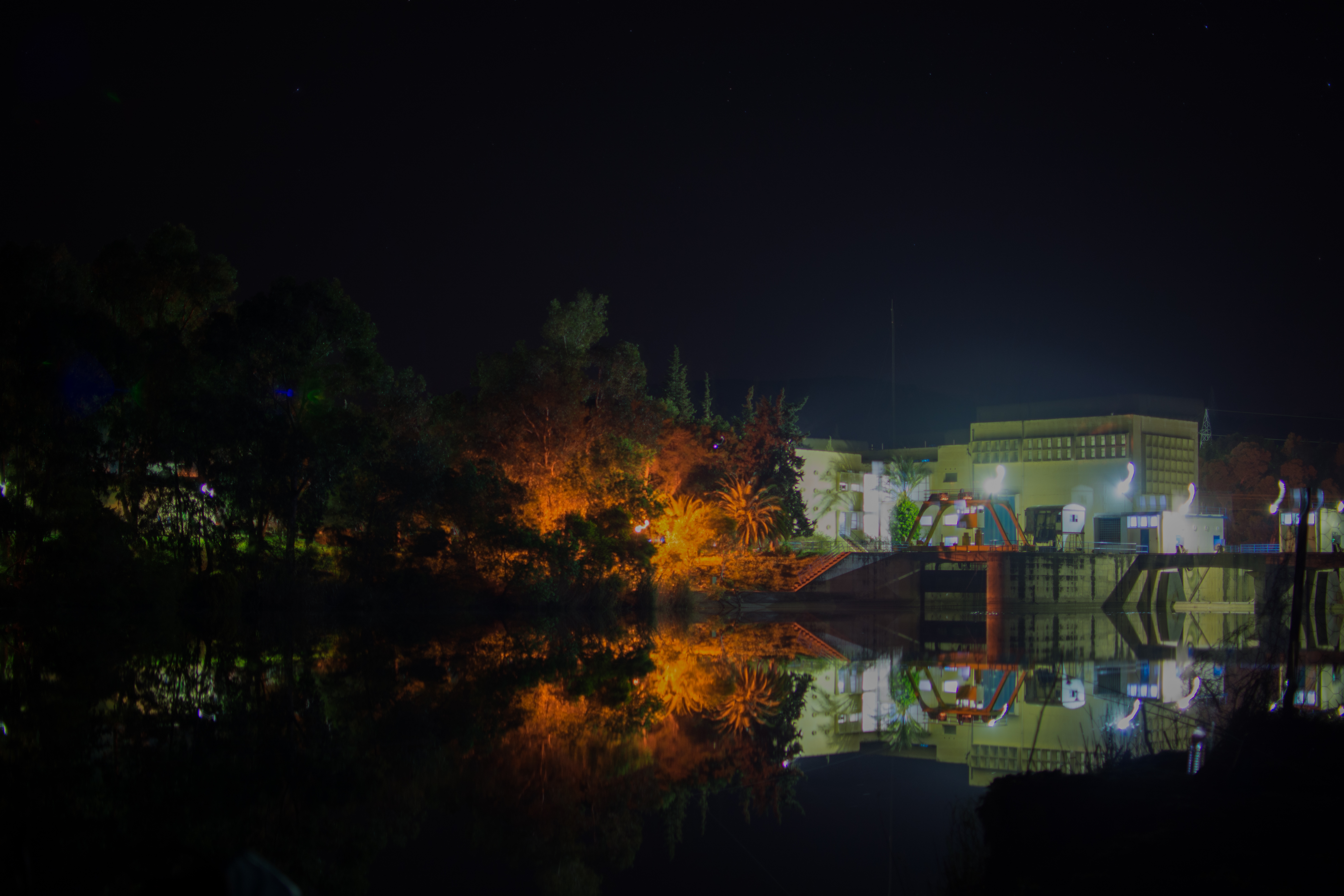
- Barrage Laaroussia of Tebourba

- Location in Tunisia
- Coordinates: 36°50′N 9°50′E
- Country: Tunisia
- Governorate: La Manouba Governorate

Population (2022)
  - Total: 29,948
- Time zone: UTC1 (CET)

Tebourba (Tunisian Arabic: طبربة ṫbūrbā) is a town in Tunisia, located about 20 miles (30 km) from the capital Tunis, former ancient city (Thuburbo Minus) and bishopric, now a Latin Catholic titular see.

== Thuburbo Minus ==
Historically Thuburbo Minus ("Little Thuburbo") was a Roman settlement in Africa Proconsularis, located at present-day Tebourba, It was founded in the 1st century BC as a colony for veterans and was officially named Colonia VIII (Octavianorum) Thuburbi. Despite the name it is believed to have been founded by Caesar for veterans of the Eighth and Thirteenth legions sometime after 46BC. The second century Roman jurist Sextus Caecilius Africanus (d.c. 175) is believed to have come from Thuburbo Minus. Thuburbo Minus is mentioned in the Antonine Itinerary, 44, and the Tabula Peutingeriana.

Situated on a hill, modern Tebourba occupied only a part of the ancient site, when it was rebuilt in the 15th century by the Andalusian Moors. The Roman amphitheatre, dated to the second century, was still standing at the end of the 17th century, when it was destroyed to build a bridge. The nearby Thuburbo Maius ("Greater Thuburbo") is in ruins.

Raising sheep and the manufacture of woolen goods (vestis afra) seems to have been a significant part of the local economy.

The diocese of Thuburbo Minus was a suffragan of Carthage. Traditionally, it was at Thuburbo Minus that the Christian martyrs Perpetua and Felicity with their companions were arrested. The two known bishops of this city were: Victor, present at the Conference of Carthage (411), where he had as his competitor the Donatist Maximinus; and Germanus, who signed (646) the letter of the bishops of the proconsulate to the Patriarch Paul II of Constantinople against the Monothelites.

The remains of a basilica, the amphitheatre and some mosaics can still be seen. The amphitheatre, which was dug partly into a hill, must have originally measured 36 x 48 m.

=== Titular see ===
Thuburbo Minus is included in the Catholic Church's list of titular bishoprics since the diocese was formally revived in the late 19th century.

It has had the following incumbents, of the lowest (episcopal) rank:

- Jules-Etienne Gazaniol (1892.02.27 – 1896.12.03)
- François Gerboin, White Fathers (M. Afr.) (1897.01.28 – 1912.06.27)
- Étienne-Benoît Larue, M. Afr. (1913.01.28 – 1935.10.05)
- Xavier Ferdinand J. Thoyer, Jesuits (S.J.) (1936.12.23 – 1955.09.14) as last Apostolic Vicar of Fianarantsoa (Madagascar) (1936.12.23 – 1955.09.14), promoted first Bishop of Fianarantsoa (1955.09.14 – 1958.12.11), again promoted first Metropolitan Archbishop of Fianarantsoa (1958.12.11 – 1962.04.02); emeritate as Titular Archbishop of Odessus (1962.04.02 – death 1970.10.07)
- Cesare Marie Guerrero (1957.03.14 – 1961.03.28), as emeritate; previously Bishop of Lingayen (Philippines) (1929.02.22 – 1937.12.16), Titular Bishop of Limisa (1937.12.16 – 1949.05.14) & Auxiliary Bishop of Manila (Philippines) (1937.12.16 – 1949.05.14), Bishop of San Fernando (Philippines) (1949.05.14 – 1957.03.14)
- William John McNaughton (나길모 굴리엘모), Maryknoll Fathers (M.M.) (1961.06.06 – 1962.03.10)
- Nicholas Grimley, Society of African Missions (S.M.A.) (1962.05.07 – 1995.06.09)
- Antonio Pepito Palang, Divine Word Missionaries (S.V.D.) (2002.03.25 – ...), Apostolic Vicar of San Jose in Mindoro (Philippines)

== History ==
=== Roman era ===
Despite the lack of references dealing with the history of the city of Tebourba during the Old Testament, the information we have confirms its status since the second half of the first century BC. During this period, Augustus established several colonies in Africa. In this context, the small colony of Tebourba, Thuburbo Minus, was established with the aim of housing veterans belonging to the Eighth Corps, given the fertile lands available in this region distributed on both banks of the Medjerda River. The archaeological monuments in the city of Tebourba testify to the extent of its development during the Roman era, especially the circular theater and water tanks, in addition to many partially visible monuments that require field intervention. The city of Tebourba was also known during this period for the spread of the Christian religion, as the sources mention some notable figures for whom this city became famous, since the end of the second century and the beginning of the third century AD. In this context, we can mention the two Saints Félicité et Perpétue, who were persecuted and then executed in the circular theater in Carthage in the year 203 AD during the reign of Septime Sévère. The colony of Tebourba was also surrounded by many small towns and villages, the importance of which archaeological excavations have proven, such as Uzalissar, El-Mahrine Sidi Ghrib, Thubba, Thibiuca, Cancari

=== The Middle Ages ===
With the end of ancient times and the beginning of a new era with the spread of the Islamic religion and Arab civilization, the history of the region did not end, but rather continued, but in a new religious form, a different ethnic presence, and the subsequent cultural peculiarities that were new and different from the previous ones. Despite the paucity of historical data about the region in classical Arabic sources, its history has not been interrupted. On the contrary, human reconstruction has continued due to the importance of the mjarrdah water (Baqardah), which constantly nourishes its lands. This made it a constantly fertile land that provided the necessary products for the major cities from Kairouan to Tunisia from the era of the governors to the Husseini era. There is no clearer evidence of the Arab presence there in the intermediate period than its topology, which refers us to the Arab tribes that settled there. Although Ibn Khaldun called it Tabourba and described its wall and fortress during the reign of its emir, Modafi bin Allal al-Qaisi, one of its sheikhs, at the time of the spread of chaos in Africa following the rift between Al-Muizz bin Badis and the Fatimid Caliphate in Cairo, there were also some references to the fertility and agricultural wealth that the region enjoyed Thanks to mjarrdah water. It seems that the city of Tebourba, its destination, had many fortresses (including Ghanoush Castle), and not just the city’s fortress, the foundation of which dates back to the period of Arab presence there since the first century AH. Some specialists say that the circular theater played the role of a fortress during the period of chaos in the second half of the fifth century AH.

=== The modern and contemporary Testaments ===
The city of Tebourba was an important base for the Ottoman rule, which had been established in Tunisia since the year 1574, in terms of agriculture, taxation, and the military. On this base, Othman Dey built the Tunisian Dar al-Sultan project, considering that the Tebourba region was the richest of the provinces, close to the capital and subject to direct rule by state agencies, and in the city and its borders an agricultural civilization arose. New after the concentration of Andalusian immigrants there and the delegations of the rest of tribes to it, and the concentration of the Zawawa and Gharaba bands and their families in Hanashirha and Dasharha. A new economic, human and urban blood has flowed into it, which today has become one of the most important components of its material and intangible heritage, from buildings to books and manuscripts... passing through agricultural methods and their machinery, to newly developed crops and plantings, irrigation methods, means of transportation and traction... and olive presses, and all the way to the social systems and religious, educational and cultural institutions, and the zawiya's have spread. Every zawiya reflects this ethnic diversity that the city embraced in the modern era. As for contemporary history, the French era made Tebourba and its backs the most important stronghold of agricultural colonialism. It introduced modern mechanization, transformed the farms into modern estates, and introduced new crops, the most important of which are grains and grapes. Good wine presses, olive presses, and granaries for storing grains spread. The railway was established, which It penetrates Tebourba until the station has become part of the city's heritage and a site of its memory. Tebourba was the scene of The Battle of Tebourba Gap in the Tunisia Campaign of World War II, lasting from November 29 until December 4, 1942. The battle involved the 2nd Battalion of the Royal Hampshire Regiment of the British Army against the Axis Forces.The Hampshires held the town for several days until it fell to the Germans on December 4. The battle is commemorated in the name of a road in Southampton, England called "Tebourba Way." There is a small war memorial on the roadside at the junction with Oakley Road. Tebourba Drive in Alverstoke, Gosport is also named after the battle, as is the Tebourba House apartment block in nearby Fareham. A row of 8 council houses on Outlands Lane in Curdridge, Hampshire are named Tebourba Way.. Education in Tebourba during the time of modern colonialism, both in Tebourba and in Zitouni, was another source of collective memory and the birth of a local cultured class whose models still circulate among us. Qur’anic schools, Franco-Arabic schools, French schools, and student hostels were established, given the importance and abundance of the presence of French colonial settlers with their families and the importance of the element of local notables, and all of these sections together or all. One chapter individually has not yet received study and analysis.

The Katateeb is considered a popular religious and educational institution that has a strong influence in the Tunisian country, where it has remained, over decades, a place for learning and knowledge, based on the interest in the Holy Book of God by preserving, learning and teaching. The khateebs are located inside mosques or zawiyas, and the teaching program in them is based on a combination of memorizing the Qur’an and hadiths of the Prophet, teaching worship, and education in Islamic literature, writing, and chants. The idea of Quranic writings crystallized since the first centuries of Islam, when Muslims were interested in educating their children, taking care of their knowledge, and striving to improve and develop their methods of teaching and memorizing them. The city of Tebourba is full of numerous bookshops, including the book of Sidi al-Jami’ al-Kabir, the Mosque of Sidi Thabet, the Mosque of Jaafar, Nahj al-Sabbah, the zawiya of Sidi bin Hassan, the zawiya of Sidi Ali al-Azouz, and Sidi al-Tahir. The popular memory in Tebourba is filled with many names of writers and sheikhs such as Muhammad bin Ismail, Bashir Mayneh, Azouz Belhaj Ahmed, Radwan Al-Sedqawi, Faraj Bouaziz, Abdullah bin Nasr, Al-Taher Al-Rubaie, Mukhtar Belhadi, Al-Taher Mahjoub called them soldiers of culture and education. The role of the disciplinarian was not limited to the book only, but also extended to the homes of his students, where the guardians of the students would threaten their children by informing the disciplinarian when they committed mistakes at home, which made the disciplinarian a place of respect and fear for his students.

== Sources and external links ==
- GCatholic with titular incumbent bio links

Attribution
