= DXMM =

DXMM may refer to:

- DXMM-AM, an AM radio station broadcasting in Jolo, Sulu
- DXMM-FM, an FM radio station broadcasting in Cagayan de Oro, branded as Brigada News FM
- DXMM (defunct), a defunct AM radio station in Davao City
