= DWBL =

DWBL may refer to:

- DWBL-AM, an AM radio station broadcasting in Metro Manila
- DWBL-FM, an FM radio station broadcasting in Pampanga, branded as Bright FM
