= CMN Radio =

Satellite radio station of the Catholic Radio Network in the Philippines

San Juan; Philippines
- Frequency: Cignal Channel 311 (2016–present)

Programming
- Format: News/Talk; Religious Radio; Soft AC; Christian Music
- Affiliations: EWTN Global Catholic Radio

Ownership
- Owner: Catholic Media Network
- Sister stations: Radio Veritas 846

History
- First air date: 1997
- Former frequencies: Dream Satellite TV Channel 204 (2001–2017)

Links
- Webcast: CMN Radio Webcast
- Website: www.catholicmedianetwork.com

CMN Radio is the flagship satellite radio station owned by the Catholic Media Network in the Philippines. Its studios are located in San Juan, Metro Manila and operates 19 hours daily on Cignal Channel 311 and via livestreaming on the CMN website.

== Network synopsis ==
CMN Radio pipes in a cumulative 9 hours of news content to its member-stations via its syndicated 90-minute national morning newscast CMN Pilipinas on weekdays and its Saturday health show Sagip Buhay. Outside its news hours, the content is satellite-exclusive, with the station serving as the Philippine relay broadcaster of EWTN Global Catholic Radio, occupying the midday and off-peak hours. Automated musical programming, and simulcasts of 99.1 Spirit FM Batangas's select program grids since March 19, 2018, is scheduled on the weekdays in between EWTN blocks and closedown, and weekends.

Unlike other national radio networks, programming distributed to stations outside its regular news service is done on special religious events, pooling with TV Maria, the Cebu Catholic Television Network (independent of CMN) and the local station in the area of the event.

== Programming ==
- CMN Pilipinas (1997–present)
- Sagip Buhay (1997–present)
- EWTN Global Catholic Radio hookup (1997–present)
- 99.1 Spirit FM simulcast (select timeslots only) (2018–present)

=== Current on-air staff ===
- Ariel Ayala

== See also ==
- Catholic Media Network
