= Pablito Tagura =

Filipino Catholic prelate (born 1962)

His Excellency, The Most Reverend Pablito M. Tagura SVD, D.D., PhD
- Vicar Apostolic of San Jose in Mindoro
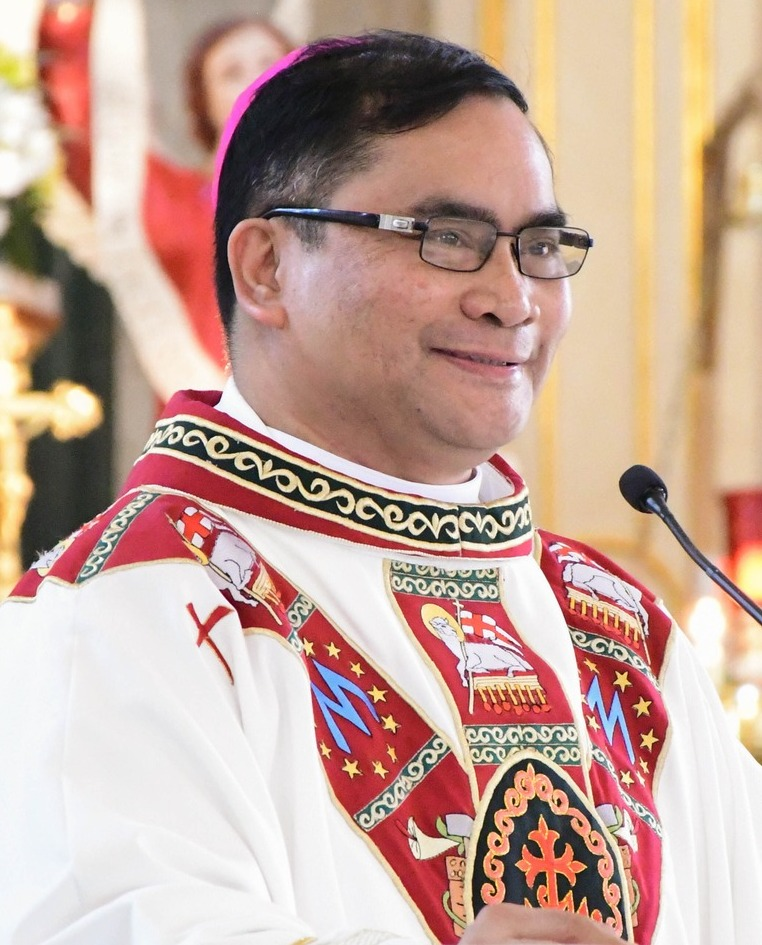
- Tagura in 2023
- Church: Roman Catholic Church
- See: Apostolic Vicariate of San Jose in Mindoro
- Appointed: December 17, 2022
- Installed: February 25, 2023
- Predecessor: Antonio P. Palang
- Previous posts: Rector and Dean of Studies, Christ the King Mission Seminary (2020–2023)

Orders
- Ordination: December 17, 1988 by Cesar C. Raval
- Consecration: February 17, 2023 by Luis Antonio G. Tagle

Personal details
- Born: Pablito Martinez Tagura; January 15, 1962 (age 64) Tayum, Abra, Philippines
- Motto: Animam meam pono pro ovibus "I lay down my life for the sheep" (John 10:15)
- Coat of arms: Pablito M. Tagura's coat of arms

Ordination history
History
Diaconal ordination
- Ordained by: Cesar C. Raval
Priestly ordination
- Ordained by: Cesar C. Raval
Episcopal consecration
- Principal consecrator: Luis Antonio Tagle
- Co-consecrators: Charles John Brown; Gilbert Garcera
- Styles
- Reference style: His Excellency; The Most Reverend
- Spoken style: Your Excellency
- Religious style: Bishop

Pablito Martinez Tagura (born January 15, 1962), is a Filipino Roman Catholic bishop currently serving as the apostolic vicar of San Jose in Mindoro. He was appointed to this position by Pope Francis on December 17, 2022, and was installed on February 25, 2023.

== Early life and education ==
Tagura was born in Tayum, Abra , and raised in Lagangilang, Abra, Philippines. His parents, Marcos B. Tagura and Magdalena M. Tagura, were both educators. He has four siblings.

He completed his secondary education at St. Joseph Minor Seminary before transferring to Divine Word College, Bangued, Abra. In 1978, he entered Christ the King Mission Seminary in Quezon City. He later joined the Society of the Divine Word (SVD) and completed his novitiate at Divine Word Seminary in Tagaytay City.

Tagura earned a Bachelor of Arts in philosophy (cum laude) and a Master of Arts in philosophy (magna cum laude) from Divine Word Seminary. He also obtained his ecclesiastical and AB Theology degree (magna cum laude) from Divine Word Seminary with a degree conferred by the Pontifical Urban University. In 1997, he completed his Doctor of Philosophy at Marquette University in Milwaukee, Wisconsin, USA.

== Priesthood ==
Tagura professed his first vows on June 6, 1982, and his perpetual vows on May 31, 1988. He was ordained a priest on December 17, 1988, in Abra.

Following his ordination, Tagura served as a professor at Christ the King Mission Seminary in Quezon City from 1989 to 1991. After returning to Philippines after finishing his PHD, he resumed his role at Christ the King Mission Seminary, where he served as professor and economer from 1997 to 1999, then as dean of studies and professor from 1999 to 2004. He was later appointed rector, dean of studies, and professor from 2005 to 2014.

From 2015 to 2018, he was a member of the Provincial Council of the SVD Philippine Central Province. Between 2017 and 2020, he served as a guest professor at Divine Word College in Epworth, Iowa, USA. In 2020, he returned to Christ the King Mission Seminary as rector and dean of studies.

== Episcopal ministry ==
On December 17, 2022, Pope Francis appointed Tagura as the vicar apostolic of San Jose in Mindoro. He was consecrated as a bishop on February 17, 2023, at Christ the King Mission Seminary in Quezon City, with Cardinal Luis Antonio G. Tagle serving as the principal consecrator and Archbishop Charles Brown and Archbishop Gilbert Garcera of Lipa as co-consecrators.

His installation took place on February 25, 2023, at the Cathedral-Parish of St. Joseph the Worker in San Jose, Occidental Mindoro.

In April 2024, Bishop Tagura banned the public veneration of the controversial Marian image associated with the Lipa Marian Apparition in his vicariate, citing the Vatican's long-standing ruling against its authenticity.

Catholic Church titles
Preceded by Antonio Palang	Vicar Apostolic of San Jose in Mindoro; February 25, 2023 – present	Incumbent
