= DWVM =

Radio station in Lucena, Philippines

Spirit FM Lucena (DWVM)
- Lucena; Philippines
- Broadcast area: Quezon and surrounding areas
- Frequency: 103.9 MHz
- Branding: Spirit FM 103.9

Programming
- Language: Filipino
- Format: Contemporary MOR, OPM, Religious
- Affiliations: Catholic Media Network

Ownership
- Owner: Diocese of Lucena; (Catholic Bishops' Conference of the Philippines)

History
- First air date: October 1992
- Call sign meaning: Voice of Mary

Technical information
- Licensing authority: NTC
- Class: BCDE
- Power: 10,000 watts
- ERP: 20,000 watts

Links
- Website: 103.9 Spirit FM Lucena

DWVM (103.9 FM), broadcasting as Spirit FM 103.9, is a radio station owned and operated by the Diocese of Lucena. The station's studio and transmitter are located at the Centro Pastoral Bldg., Diocesan Compound, Brgy. Isabang, Lucena.
