= DZGN =

Spirit FM Sorsogon (DZGN)
- Sorsogon City; Philippines
- Broadcast area: Sorsogon and surrounding areas
- Frequency: 102.3 MHz
- Branding: 102.3 Spirit FM

Programming
- Languages: Bicolano, Filipino
- Format: Contemporary MOR, OPM, Religious Radio
- Affiliations: Catholic Media Network

Ownership
- Owner: Good News Sorsogon Foundation

History
- First air date: November 22, 1984
- Call sign meaning: Good News

Technical information
- Licensing authority: NTC
- Class: C / D / E
- Power: 10,000 watts

Links
- Webcast: https://spritfm.wordpress.com/

DZGN (102.3 FM), broadcasting as 102.3 Spirit FM, is a radio station owned and operated by Good News Sorsogon Foundation, the media arm of the Diocese of Sorsogon. Its studios and transmitter are located at the back of Sts. Peter & Paul Cathedral Compound, Rizal Street, Sorsogon City.

The station originally launched on November 22, 1984, as a Top 40 station. On February 17, 2007, it was relaunched as a mass-based station, featuring a mix of music, religious programming, and talk shows.
