= DWAM =

Radio station in Batangas, Philippines

Spirit FM Batangas (DWAM)
- Batangas City; Philippines
- Broadcast area: Batangas and surrounding areas
- Frequency: 99.1 MHz (HD Radio)
- Branding: 99.1 Spirit FM

Programming
- Language: Filipino
- Format: Contemporary MOR, OPM, Religious Radio
- Affiliations: Catholic Media Network

Ownership
- Owner: Radyo Bayanihan System; (Catholic Bishops Conference of the Philippines)
- Sister stations: DWAL

History
- First air date: May 8, 1999
- Call sign meaning: Lifted from callsign of former AM station.

Technical information
- Licensing authority: NTC
- Class: C/D/E
- Power: 5,000 watts
- ERP: 10,000 watts
- Transmitter coordinates: 13°42′39″N 121°08′16″E

Links
- Webcast: Live Stream
- Website: 99.1 Spirit FM; 99.1 Spirit FM Batangas on Facebook

DWAM (99.1 FM), broadcasting as 99.1 Spirit FM, is a radio station owned and operated by the Radyo Bayanihan System, the media arm of the Archdiocese of Lipa. The station's studio is located at the 2nd floor, St. Francis de Sales Broadcast Center, 7 C. Tirona St., Batangas City; and its transmitter facilities are located at Brgy. Sto. Domingo, Batangas City.

Since March 19, 2018, the station has also been available across the country via satellite through its select program grids being simulcast on CMN Radio, replacing the latter's in-house music automation.

== History ==
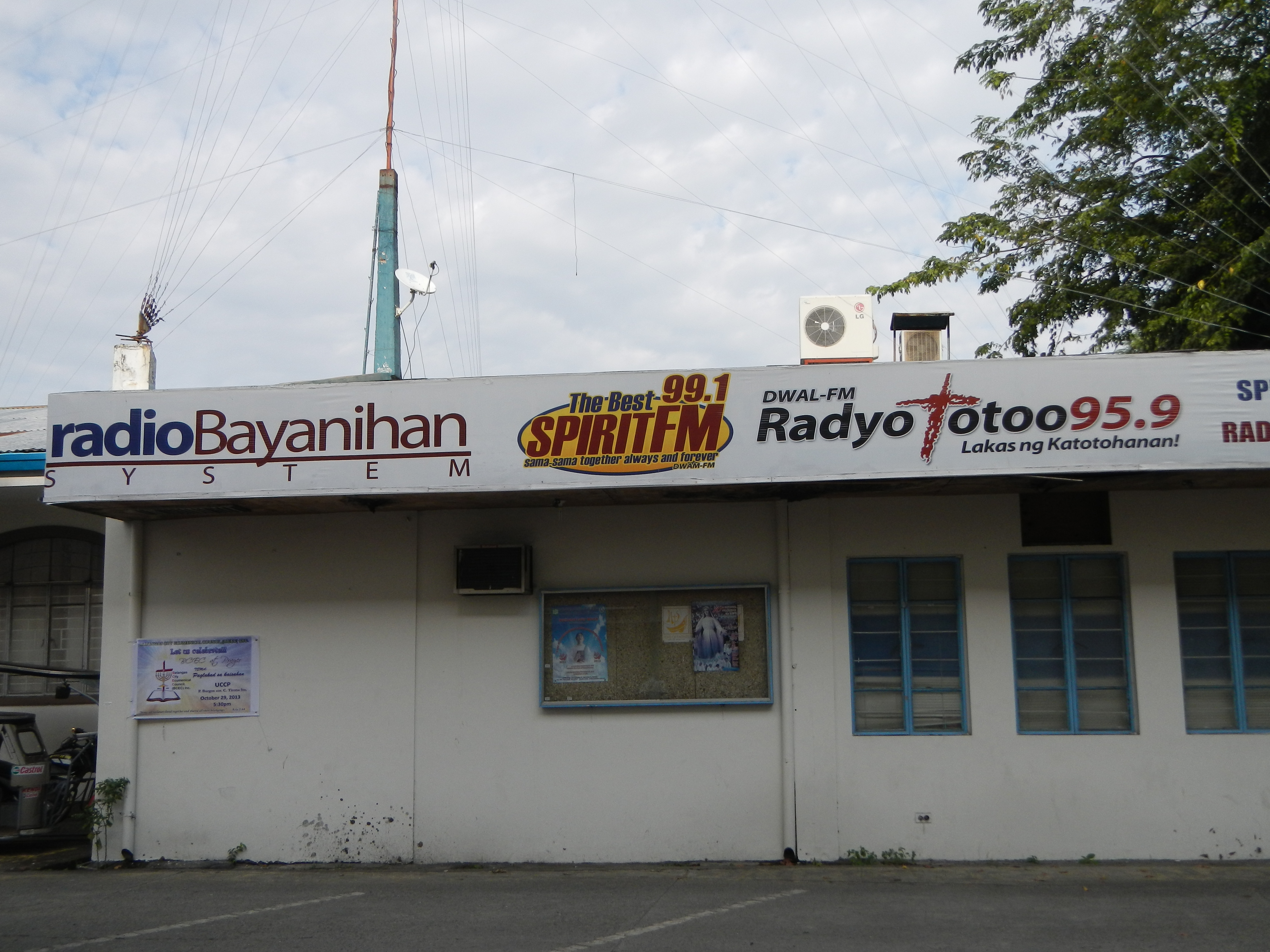
Facade of Spirit FM's former studio. The building has since been demolished.

DWAM-FM was formally launched on May 8, 1999 at its inaugural facilities at Paharang West, Batangas City as an all-disco station under inaugural station manager Fr. Mike Samaniego and its first on-air talent, Frederick Joseph Ona (a.k.a. DJ Joseph), who previously started out in the Lucena City radio market and had stints in Sydney, Australia, mostly targeting the Filipino community. Months after, Fr. Nonie Dolor, known by his radio name The Niteowl, joined the roster after declining talks by GV 99.9 to jump ship while he was still on AM radio. He would remain with Spirit FM as a Sunday jock until stepping down in late 2014 to concentrate on 95.9 FM.

Spirit FM later transferred to the now-demolished Basilica Site broadcast complex but kept its Paharang transmitter intact. They later inaugurated the tradition of their annual DJ hunts that launched careers of notable staff such as Ricky, Raynuts, Diego and Kris, who were well-received by listeners.

In May 2009, the station transferred its transmission facilities from Paharang to Barangay Santo Domingo, where its sister station's transmitter facilities are located.

On May 21, 2015, both stations moved to the Balmes Building, which became the St. Francis de Sales Broadcast Center in January 2018. The Basilica Site broadcast complex was later demolished and converted to a parish mortuary.

On March 19, 2018, select program grids of the station began to be simulcast via satellite on CMN Radio.

In February 2017, DWAM became the second Batangas-based station (the first being Brigada News FM's Luzon flagship DWEY) to operate 24 hours daily, after its history of broadcasting for 18 hours. Due to the economic downfall caused by the COVID-19 pandemic, the station reverted to its 18-hour daily operations.

== Ratings ==
Since 2001, the station became the perennial ratings leader until March 1, 2015 when Brigada News FM briefly led the Batangas-Lipa radio market. At the September 2017 Kantar Media ratings sweep, 99.1 Spirit FM regained the leadership with a 47% listenership share and repeated a year later with a 42% audience share.
