= Manaoag Dominican Radio =

Philippine radio station

Manaoag; Philippines
- Broadcast area: Manaoag and surrounding areas
- Frequency: 102.7 MHz
- Branding: 102.7 Manaoag Dominican Radio

Programming
- Languages: Pangasinense, Filipino
- Format: Religious Radio
- Affiliations: Catholic Media Network

Ownership
- Owner: Manaoag Dominican Broadcasting Inc.

History
- First air date: August 15, 2008
- Former frequencies: 102.3 MHz

Technical information
- Power: 500 watts

Links
- Website: Official Website

102.7 Manaoag Dominican Radio (102.7 FM) is a radio station owned and operated by Manaoag Dominican Broadcasting Inc., the media arm of the Our Lady of Manaoag. The station's studio and transmitter are located at the Minor Basilica of Our Lady of Manaoag, Brgy. Poblacion, Manaoag.
