= DWAL =

Radio station in Batangas, Philippines

Radyo Totoo Batangas (DWAL)
- Batangas City; Philippines
- Broadcast area: Batangas and surrounding areas
- Frequency: 95.9 MHz (HD Radio)
- Branding: 95.9 Radyo Totoo

Programming
- Language: Filipino
- Format: News, Public Affairs, Talk, Religious Radio
- Affiliations: Catholic Media Network

Ownership
- Owner: Radyo Bayanihan System
- Sister stations: DWAM

History
- First air date: 1969 (on AM) mid-2009 (on FM)
- Former call signs: DWAM (1969–2002)
- Former frequencies: 1290 kHz (1969–November 22, 1978); 1368 kHz (November 23, 1978 - 1984); 1080 kHz (1984 - 2002)
- Call sign meaning: Archdiocese of Lipa

Technical information
- Licensing authority: NTC
- Class: C/D/E
- Power: 1,500 watts
- ERP: 7,500 watts
- Transmitter coordinates: 13°42′39″N 121°08′16″E

Links
- Website: 95.9 Radyo Totoo

DWAL (95.9 FM), broadcasting as 95.9 Radyo Totoo, is a radio station owned and operated by the Radyo Bayanihan System, the media arm of the Archdiocese of Lipa. The station's studio is located at the 2nd floor, St. Francis de Sales Broadcast Center, 7 C. Tirona St., Batangas City; and its transmitter facilities are located at Brgy. Sto. Domingo, Batangas City.

It is known as the Evangelization Radio, which later on evolved into News and Evangelization Radio; thus, becoming the first news and talk FM station owned and operated by the Catholic church.

== History ==
=== 1969-2002: AM era ===
DWAL-FM was inaugurated in 1969 as DWAM-AM on 1290 kHz. It was initially located along Calero Road, Batangas City. However, with the declaration of Martial Law on September 21, 1972, under Ferdinand Marcos, the station was closed under strict censorship imposed under Proclamation No. 1081. After complying with the papers needed for resumption of broadcasts, DWAM-AM returned on air by October that same year. By the middle of the 70s, the station moved successively to Hilltop, Kumintang Ibaba and settled at the now-demolished Basilica Site until it ceased operations.

DWAM, through the years, provided listeners with religious broadcasting, news, music and oftentimes, religious drama. Its notable roster of personalities during the 70's included Lita Aguila-Bicol, Bert Cabual, Fr. Nonie Dolor, Oscar Adelfo de Villa, Rene Beraña and Avis Magtaas; Bicol and Dolor would later team up to reestablish the station at 95.9 FM in 2009 while Cabual rejoined in 2011 after years of overseas work in London.

DWAM-AM moved to 1368 kHz from 1290 kHz on November 23, 1978, in response to the switch of the Philippine AM bandplan from the NARBA's 10 kHz spacing to the 9-kHz spacing promulgated by the Geneva Frequency Plan of 1975

It was also in this period that 1290/1368 kHz enjoyed the distinction of being one of the two AM stations in the market until Batangas Capitol operated Radyo Balisong (now known as DZBR Bible Radio 531, owned by the evangelical group Cathedral of Praise) opened shop in 1981.

In 1984, DWAM moved again to the 1080 kHz spot vacated by DZBT whose physical assets were relocated to Legazpi City, Albay and reestablished as DWRL

In the 90s, influx of population and development of the city started off, but the potent of provincial AM stations started to dwindle as FM stations like GV 99.9 and Bay Radio (now Brigada News FM) started to air in the city in 1996 and 1998, respectively. On May 8, 1999, 99.1 Spirit FM was established to cater the younger generation with music.

=== 2002-2008: Halt of Operations ===
Due to the antiquity of the facilities of the AM station, DWAM-AM ceased operations in mid-2002. Efforts of establishing another one took years. The first permit of operations expired in 2004 before full supply of materials was commenced. It was in this time also that two choices were decided, whether to revive the station in the same frequency band or to migrate to an FM frequency as an "AM on FM format", a concept that was eight to ten years ahead of being a prospective national medium. Ultimately, all efforts of reestablishment fell off.

=== 2009-2014: Transfer to FM ===
In mid-2009, a new station on the frequency of 95.9 MHz started to air, later to be unveiled as ALFM 95.9 Radyo Totoo with its first slogan Makipanalig, Makiugnay at Makidasal. Test broadcasts began as early as February 2009 under the tentative callsign DZAL with its frequency acquired by Radyo Bayanihan System from the distinct Bayanihan Broadcasting Corporation that served as licensees for Catholic Media Network radio stations in Quezon Province and Baler, Aurora. However, since the calls were already taken by a now-dormant AM station in Bicol, it was given the call letters DWAL. Furthermore, on its first months of broadcast, the station was severely handicapped on its northern broadcast fringe by Radyo Natin Calamba that was then broadcasting on the same frequency. The issue was settled later with the Calamba station moving to 106.3 FM in 2010. It was also on that same year that DWAL-FM first revamped its imaging campaign by carrying the Evangelization Radio tagline.

Since 2010, ALFM has been a training ground for students taking up Mass Communication, AB Communication and Journalism in their pursuit for work in the media industry after graduation. These OJTs work as news gatherers and field reporters during their tenure. One of their notable call-ups from the on-the-job intern to the regular reporters pool was Minerva Padua, who worked with the station from 2012 to 2015.

=== 2015-present: Major Changes ===
On May 21, 2015, ALFM and Spirit FM went off-air to give way to its transfer from the Basilica Site to its new broadcast complex at the Balmes Building at C. Tirona Street. It returned broadcasting four days later. The old studio has since been demolished and converted to a parish mortuary.

With the retirements of Fr. Nonie Dolor and Lita Aguila-Bicol in April 2016, the station gradually shifted to a more news-intensive format that was completed in May 2017 with old station plugs voiced by Aguila-Bicol being replaced by new ones recorded by Spirit FM's DJ Joseph, and revising its slogan to cater more news as Ang Inyong News and Evangelization Radio.

In January 2018, the Balmes Building was officially renamed the St. Francis de Sales Broadcast Center, culminating a lengthy rehabilitation of both stations' respective studios for improved service to their online and 95.9's cable TV audience.

Coinciding with the station's 9th year on air, new imaging bumpers and programming were launched, starting with the retirement of the Evangelization Radio tagline and unveiling of the slogan Katiwala Mo sa Serbisyo at Tunay na Balita (Your Trusted Companion for Public Service and Truthful News). Its news operation also added Carissa Hornilla (Spirit FM's DJ Dominique) as co-anchor.

On October 6, 2018, the station went to its first 24-hour operation during the arrival of the relic of St. Padre Pio to the country.

On May 24, 2019, the station kicked-off its year-long celebration of its first decade on air, alongside its sister outlet's 20th anniversary, and Radyo Bayanihan System's 50th year in operation, with the Archdiocesan Youth Commission's July 13 outreach activity held under its conjunction. The station also unveiled its new ID, voiced by Catholic Media Network national office anchor Cecille Roxas.

== Cable television carriage ==
ALFM's TeleRadyo format was launched during the 2016 Philippine local and national elections over the Batangas provincial arm of the MyCATV cable system through its Community Billboard Channel 8. Under the deal struck by the cable channel and the station, the channel will simulcast ALFM s morning news-talk programs from 7:00-10:30 am on weekdays and Sundays, and 7:00-11:00 on Saturdays. It is dubbed as Ang NewsRadio ng Batangueño. . On May 2, 2018, MyCATV's analog cable service was discontinued upon completion of the firm's full digitalization, migrating the simulcast and the Community Channel to channel 123. In December 2018, MyCATV rebranded as Asian Vision.
