= St. Joseph Cathedral (San Jose, Occidental Mindoro) =

Latin Catholic Cathedral in Occidental Mindoro, Philippines

San Jose Cathedral
- Saint Joseph the Worker Cathedral
- Catedral de San José Obrero (Spanish)
- Katedral ni San Jose ang Manggagawa (Filipino)
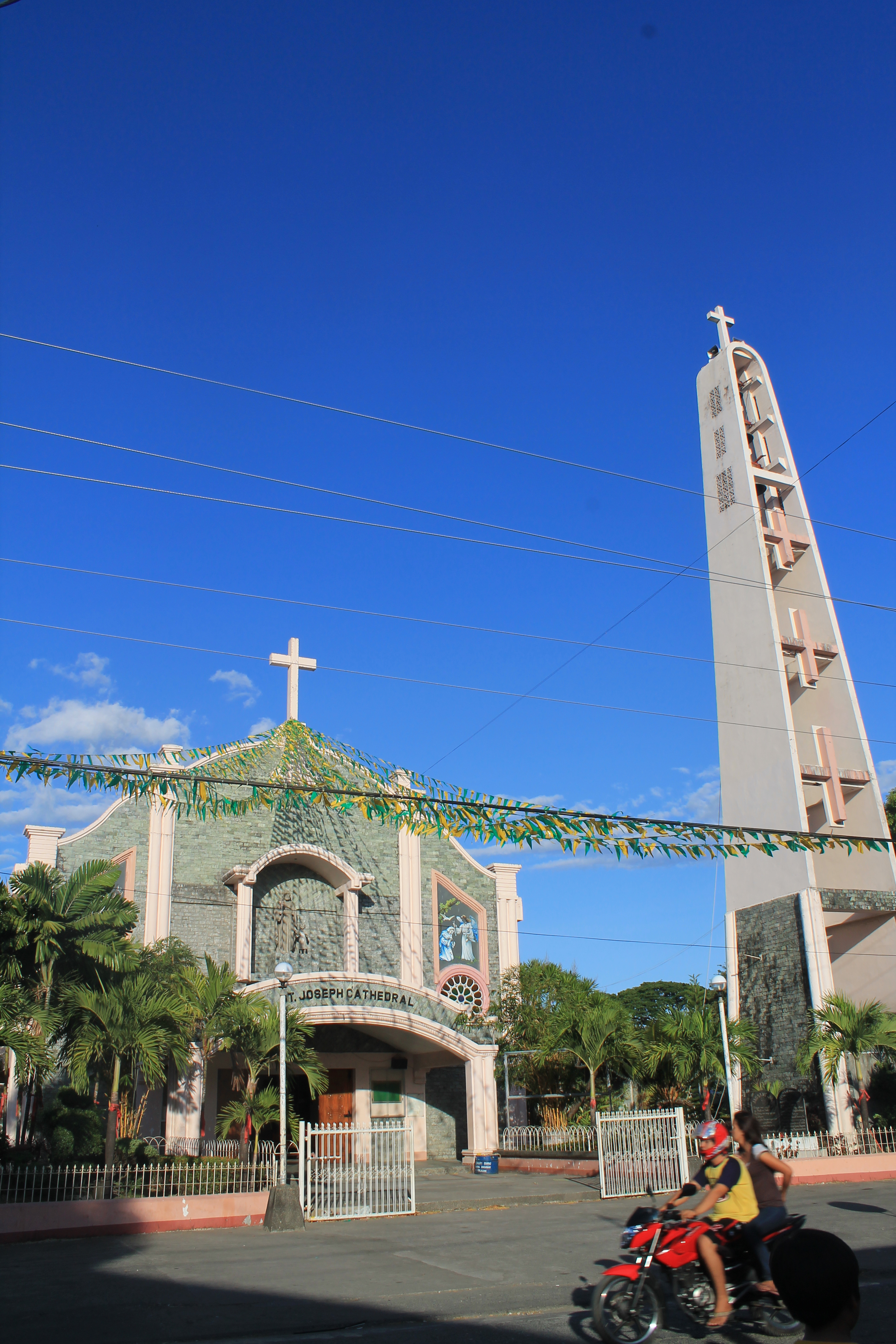
- The cathedral in 2013
- San Jose Cathedral
- 12°21′15″N 121°04′07″E
- Location: San Jose, Occidental Mindoro
- Country: Philippines
- Denomination: Latin Catholic

History
- Status: Cathedral
- Dedication: Joseph the Worker
- Consecrated: 1962

Architecture
- Functional status: Active
- Architectural type: Quonset Hut
- Groundbreaking: July 10, 1961
- Completed: September 30, 1962

Administration
- Province: Directly Exempt to the Holy See
- Metropolis: Lipa
- Archdiocese: Lipa
- Diocese: Roman Catholic Apostolic Vicariate of San Jose in Mindoro
- Deanery: St. Joseph the Worker
- Parish: Parish of San Jose-Pandurucan Occidental Mindoro

Clergy
- Archbishop: Gilbert Armea Garcera
- Bishop: Pablito Martinez Tagura
- Rector: Rev. Fr. Giovanni Jojo I. Gatdula, JCL

Saint Joseph the Worker Cathedral, commonly known as Saint Joseph Cathedral, is a Latin Catholic church in San Jose, Occidental Mindoro, Philippines. It is the episcopal seat of the Apostolic Vicariate of San Jose in Mindoro and its patron saint is Joseph the Worker.

== History ==
Ecclesiastically, Mindoro was under the jurisdiction of the Archdiocese of Manila until the creation of the Diocese of Lipa in 1910 when Mindoro was transferred under Lipa. The then Mindoro province was made into an apostolic prefecture in 1936 with Bishop William Finneman as head of the apostolic prefecture. Mindoro remained under Lipa. In 1951, following the split of Mindoro Province into the provinces of Occidental Mindoro and Oriental Mindoro, the apostolic prefecture was elevated to the Apostolic Vicariate of Calapan.

The current church building was constructed under the administration of the parish priest George Koschinski. Prior to the church building constructed under Koschinski, the chapel of San Jose used a quonset hut which was used by the Allied Forces during World War II. The replacement church structure was built by both German and Filipino Catholics and was blessed by the Apostolic Vicar of Calapan, Bishop William Duschak, on September 30, 1962.

Pope John Paul II created the Apostolic Vicariate of San Jose in Mindoro which composes the whole province of Occidental Mindoro on January 27, 1983. Vicente C. Manuel was appointed as first apostolic vicar. Manuel was ordained as a bishop on June 29, 1983. Within the same year the church was converted into a Cathedral. Antonio P. Palang was appointed as second apostolic vicar on May 31, 2002. Pablito M. Tagura was appointed as third Apostolic Vicar on December 17, 2022.

== Patrons ==
Saint Joseph is the primary and titular patron of the St. Joseph the Worker Cathedral whose feast day is on May 1. Our Lady of Fatima is the secondary patroness of the church whose feast day is on May 13.
