= DWTJ =

Philippine radio station

Spirit FM Pangasinan (DWTJ)
Burgos; Philippines
- Broadcast area: Pangasinan and surrounding areas
- Frequency: 99.3 MHz
- Branding: 99.3 Spirit FM

Programming
- Languages: Ilocano, Filipino, English
- Format: Religious Radio
- Affiliations: Catholic Media Network

Ownership
- Owner: Alaminos Community Broadcasting Corporation
- Sister stations: DZWM 864

History
- First air date: 1985
- Former call signs: DZMC
- Call sign meaning: Therese and Joseph

Technical information
- Licensing authority: NTC
- Power: 10,000 Watts
- ERP: 30,000 Watts

Links
- Webcast: Listen Live

99.3 Spirit FM (DWTJ 99.3 MHz) is an FM station owned and operated by Alaminos Community Broadcasting Corporation, the media arm of the Diocese of Alaminos. Its studios and radio transmitter are located at Opifices Christi, #140 Mapila-pila Rd., Brgy. Tambacan, Burgos, Pangasinan.
