= DZRV-AM =

Radio station in Metro Manila, Philippines

Veritas 846 (DZRV)
- Quezon City; Philippines
- Broadcast area: Mega Manila and surrounding areas
- Frequency: 846 kHz
- Branding: Veritas 846; Radyo Veritas

Programming
- Languages: Tagalog, English
- Format: Religious broadcasting, Talk
- Affiliations: Catholic Media Network

Ownership
- Owner: Archdiocese of Manila; (Radio Veritas - Global Broadcasting System)
- Sister stations: CMN Radio

History
- First air date: April 11, 1969
- Former call signs: DZST (1950–1969); DWRV (1969–1991); DZNN (1991–1998)
- Former frequencies: 860 kHz (1950–1978)
- Call sign meaning: Radio Veritas

Technical information
- Licensing authority: NTC
- Power: 50,000 watts

Links
- Webcast: Listen Live
- Website: Veritas 846

Veritas TV
- Country: Philippines
- Broadcast area: Philippines
- Network: Veritas 846 Manila
- Headquarters: Veritas Tower, 162 West Ave. cor. EDSA, Brgy. Philam, Quezon City

Programming
- Languages: Tagalog, English
- Picture format: 480i 16:9 (SDTV)

Ownership
- Owner: Global Broadcasting System (Archdiocese of Manila)

History
- Launched: November 1, 2021 (official launch)

Links
- Website: Veritas 846

DZRV (846 AM), on-air as Veritas 846 and commonly known as Radyo Veritas, is a radio station owned and operated by the Archdiocese of Manila under the Radio Veritas - Global Broadcasting System. It is the flagship member of the Catholic Media Network. The studio is located at Veritas Tower, 162 West Ave. cor. EDSA, Brgy. Philam, Quezon City, and its transmitter is located at Camaron Street, Brgy. Longos, Meycauayan.

== Timeline ==
- April 11, 1969 – Radyo Veritas was inaugurated with Asian bishops as guests. Cardinal Antonio Samorè represented Pope Paul VI. It began broadcasting on the frequency formerly assigned to DZST 860 kHz, another Catholic radio station formerly operated by the University of Santo Tomas. By that time, it was then owned by the Philippine Radio Educational and Information Center, Inc.
- November 29, 1970 – Pope Paul VI, on his pastoral visit to the country, blessed Radyo Veritas' studios with President Ferdinand E. Marcos in attendance.
- November 23, 1978 – Radyo Veritas reassigned to its new frequency of 846 kHz due to the implementation of 9 kHz spacing for medium-wave stations as stipulated by the Geneva Frequency Plan of 1975, superseding the 10 kHz NARBA spacing rule.
- February 17–22, 1981 – Radyo Veritas covered the first papal visit of Pope John Paul II in Metro Manila, Cebu, Davao City, Bacolod City, Iloilo, Legazpi City, Baguio and Morong.
- August 21, 1983 – Radyo Veritas covered the assassination of former Senator Benigno Aquino Jr. Radio Veritas personnel were stationed at the then Manila International Airport, and news surrounding the shooting were aired live. It was also the only station to broadcast the senator's funeral procession from Santo Domingo Church to Manila Memorial Park, with two million people lining the streets.
- February 22–25, 1986 – Radyo Veritas kept local and overseas audiences informed of events related to the People Power Revolution, after Cardinal Jaime Sin, Archbishop of Manila, called on the Filipinos to support Defense Minister Juan Ponce Enrile and Philippine Constabulary Chief Lt. General Fidel V. Ramos who had defected from the Marcos government. The three-day peaceful revolution eventually removed Marcos from power and installed Corazon Aquino as the eleventh President. Despite the blow-by-blow airing of the events during the EDSA revolt, several armed groups forced to destroy Radyo Veritas' transmitter in Malolos, Bulacan, of which several personnel were hurt. Later, they moved its transmitter location to Taliptip, Bulakan, Bulacan. By the same year, Radio Veritas awarded the Ramon Magsaysay Award for Journalism, Literature, and Creative Communication Arts for the station's role in delivering timely events during the 4-day revolution.
- May 17, 1991 – Radyo Veritas was acquired by the Global Broadcasting System from the original owner, Radio Veritas Asia of PREIC, and at the same time it began its commercial operations as DZNN, known as Kaibigang Totoo (Your True Friend) and The Spirit of the Philippines. DZNN also moved its studios to Makati (later moved to Ortigas) and became home to some of the notable broadcasters such as Louie Beltran, Ramon Tulfo, Rey Langit, Jay Sonza, Orly Punzalan, Joel Reyes Zobel, Melo Acuña, Dave Sta. Ana, Ernie Angeles, and Jun Ricafrente among others. Veritas 846 also became the official radio broadcaster of the Philippine Basketball Association for the coverage of live PBA games via satellite for Mega Manila radio listeners, with Manila Broadcasting Company (now MBC Media Group), providing the said coverage for provincial listeners from the late '90s to 2004.
- June 15, 1991 – Radyo Veritas covered the eruption of Mount Pinatubo. Radio Veritas personnel were stationed at Zambales, Tarlac and Pampanga and broadcast news of the volcanic eruption and damage brought by lahar that killed 847 people.
- January 10–15, 1995 – Radyo Veritas covered the second papal visit of Pope John Paul II along with the World Youth Day in Metro Manila.
- January 16–20, 2001 – DZRV-Radyo Veritas was once again involved in Philippine history when Cardinal Sin used the station to rally Filipinos to the EDSA Shrine in what became the EDSA Revolution of 2001. Millions of protestors converged on the Shrine, eventually ousting President Joseph Estrada from Malacañang and handing power to his Vice-president, Gloria Macapagal-Arroyo.
- May 3, 2005 – A new management took over the operations of Radyo Veritas. It launched its new logo and new programs centered on faith and religion. The longest-running station ID jingle of Radyo Veritas was retained (except for the ZNN part).
- April 2007 – DZRV-Radyo Veritas launched its own website (veritas846.ph) in a bid to further expand its reach in promoting the Catholic faith and teachings through different media portals.
- 2008 – DZRV-Radyo Veritas established its Kapanalig Radio Community to further engage its listeners and deepen its vision and mission as the station for truth and evangelization.
- January 15–19, 2015 – DZRV-Radyo Veritas covered the first papal visit of Pope Francis in Metro Manila, Tacloban and Palo, Leyte.
- January 24–31, 2016 – DZRV-Radyo Veritas covered the 51st International Eucharistic Congress in Cebu City.
- April 2018 – Veritas 846 was rebranded from Radyo Totoo to Ang Radyo ng Simbahan (lit. The Station of the Church) as part of the station's mission to strengthen the faith of the Catholic faithful in the country, and as preparation for the station's 50th anniversary in 2019 and the 500th anniversary of the establishment of the Catholic Church in the Philippines in 2021.
- April 2019 – Veritas 846 launched its official station jingle, on the 50th anniversary of the said station, entitled Manatili ka sa'min (lit. Stay with us), performed by former X-Factor UK contestant Alisah Bonaobra.
- March 2020 – DZRV-Radyo Veritas and TV Maria launched its regular daily masses on radio, television and Facebook live streaming to the local and overseas audiences, following of the suspension of Catholic mass services as Luzon undergoes a month-long enhanced community quarantine due to the COVID-19 pandemic from March 17 to May 31.
- April 2021 – DZRV-Radyo Veritas covered the Quincentennial of Christianity in the Philippines in Metro Manila and Cebu City.
- April 14, 2021 – DZRV-Radyo Veritas was placed under a "temporary lockdown" after some of its employees tested positive for COVID-19. However, the regular programming of the said station, which include the online masses, reflections of priests and bishops and the activities of the 500 years of the arrival of Christianity in the Philippines, were continued throughout the temporarily use of its transmitter in Taliptip, Bulacan.
- June 29, 2021 – DZRV-Radyo Veritas launched its midnight healing mass program to attend to the spiritual needs of the faithful, particularly overseas Filipino workers and Filipino immigrants.
- November 1, 2021 – Veritas 846 began simulcasting its programs on a teleradio TV channel over Sky Cable Channel 211 in Metro Manila.
- September 8, 2025 – Veritas 846 began broadcasting from its transmitter site at Brgy. Longos, Meycauayan, Bulacan, using the station's 50 kW Nautel transmitter.

== Notable anchors ==
- Honesto Ongtioco

=== Former ===
- Bro. Jun Banaag, O.P.

== See also ==
- Catholic Media Network
- TV Maria
