= DXDM =

Philippine radio station

Happy FM Kidapawan
Kidapawan; Philippines
- Broadcast area: Eastern Cotabato and surrounding areas
- Frequency: 88.7 MHz
- Branding: 88.7 Happy FM

Programming
- Languages: Cebuano, Filipino
- Format: Contemporary MOR, OPM
- Network: Happy FM
- Affiliations: Catholic Media Network

Ownership
- Owner: Notre Dame Broadcasting Corporation
- Sister stations: DXND Radyo Bida

History
- First air date: 1992
- Call sign meaning: DaMe

Technical information
- Licensing authority: NTC
- Power: 5 Kw

DXDM (88.7 FM), on-air as 88.7 Happy FM, is a radio station owned and operated by Notre Dame Broadcasting Corporation. It serves as the flagship station of Happy FM. Its studios and transmitter are located at the DXND Bldg., Daang Maharlika, Brgy. Poblacion, Kidapawan. It operates daily from 4:30 AM to 11:00 PM.
