= 909 AM =

AM radio frequency

The following radio stations broadcast on AM frequency 909 kHz:

== Botswana ==
- Voice of America

== Philippines ==
- DZEA in Laoag
- DYSP in Puerto Princesa
- DYLA in Cebu City

== Spain ==
- Radio 5 in Mallorca

== United Kingdom ==
- BBC Radio 5 Live
