= DZSB =

Radio station in Oriental Mindoro, Philippines

Spirit FM Calapan (DZSB)
- Calapan; Philippines
- Broadcast area: Northern Mindoro, parts of Batangas
- Frequency: 104.1 MHz
- Branding: 104.1 Spirit FM

Programming
- Language: Filipino
- Format: Contemporary MOR, OPM, Religious Radio
- Affiliations: Catholic Media Network

Ownership
- Owner: Diocese of Calapan

History
- First air date: 2006
- Call sign meaning: Saint Benedict

Technical information
- Licensing authority: NTC
- Power: 1,000 watts
- ERP: 2,000 watts

DZSB (104.1 FM), broadcasting as 104.1 Spirit FM, is a radio station owned and operated by the Diocese of Calapan. The station's studio and transmitter are located along Durian St. near St. Benedict Chaplaincy, Brgy. Lalud, Calapan. The station is available on local cable via Calapan Cable Channel 64.
