= DXHM =

Philippine radio station

- Mati; Philippines
- Broadcast area: Davao Oriental, parts of Davao de Oro
- Frequency: 549 kHz
- Branding: DXHM 549

Programming
- Languages: Cebuano, Filipino
- Format: News, Public Affairs, Talk, Religious Radio
- Affiliations: Catholic Media Network

Ownership
- Owner: Roman Catholic Diocese of Mati
- Sister stations: 97.5 Spirit FM

History
- First air date: 1969
- Former frequencies: 550 kHz (1969–1978)
- Call sign meaning: Heart of Mary

Technical information
- Licensing authority: NTC
- Power: 5,000 watts

DXHM (549 AM) is a radio station owned and operated by the Roman Catholic Diocese of Mati. The studio is located inside the St. John of the Cross Clergy, Brgy. Madang, Mati, Davao Oriental.
