= DXVP =

Radio station in Zamboanga City, Philippines

El Radio Verdadero (DXVP)
- Zamboanga City; Philippines
- Broadcast area: Zamboanga City, Basilan and surrounding areas
- Frequency: 1467 kHz
- Branding: El Radio Verdadero

Programming
- Languages: Chavacano, Filipino, English
- Format: News, Public Affairs, Talk, Religious
- Affiliations: Catholic Media Network

Ownership
- Owner: Archdiocese of Zamboanga

History
- First air date: 1985

Technical information
- Licensing authority: NTC
- Power: 10,000 watts

DXVP (1467 AM) El Radio Verdadero is a radio station owned and operated by the Archdiocese of Zamboanga. The station's studio is located at Zamboanga Metropolitan Cathedral Compound, La Purisima St. and its transmitter is located at Brgy. Bolong, Zamboanga City.
