= DZVT-AM =

Radyo Totoo Mindoro (DZVT)
- San Jose; Philippines
- Broadcast area: Southern Mindoro
- Frequency: 1395 kHz
- Branding: DZVT Radyo Totoo

Programming
- Language: Filipino
- Format: News, Public Affairs, Talk, Religious Radio
- Affiliations: Catholic Media Network

Ownership
- Owner: Apostolic Vicariate of San Jose
- Sister stations: 93.7 Spirit FM

History
- First air date: March 6, 1991

Technical information
- Licensing authority: NTC
- Power: 5,000 watts
- ERP: 10,000 watts

DZVT (1395 AM) Radyo Totoo is a radio station owned and operated by the Apostolic Vicariate of San Jose. The station's studio and transmitter are located in Brgy. Labangan Poblacion, San Jose, Occidental Mindoro.

Last October 26, 2011, the place, which houses DZVT & Spirit FM, was burned by unidentified men.
