= DYAF =

Radio station in Bacolod, Philippines

Radyo Totoo Bacolod (DYAF)
- Bacolod; Philippines
- Broadcast area: Northern Negros Occidental and surrounding areas
- Frequency: 1143 kHz
- Branding: DYAF Radyo Totoo

Programming
- Languages: Hiligaynon, Filipino
- Format: News, Public Affairs, Talk, Religious Radio
- Affiliations: Catholic Media Network

Ownership
- Owner: Roman Catholic Diocese of Bacolod; (Catholic Bishops Conference of the Philippines)

History
- First air date: December 19, 1992
- Former names: Radyo Veritas Global (December 19, 1992–February 24, 2020)

Technical information
- Licensing authority: NTC
- Power: 5,000 watts

DYAF (1143 AM) Radyo Totoo is a radio station owned and operated by the Roman Catholic Diocese of Bacolod. Its studio is located at DYAF Broadcast Office, Bishop's House Complex, San Juan Street, Bacolod, and its transmitter is located at St. John Parish Compound, Brgy. Sum-ag, Bacolod.
