= DZVT-FM =

Radio station in Occidental Mindoro, Philippines

Spirit FM Mindoro (DZVT)
San Jose; Philippines
- Broadcast area: Southern Mindoro
- Frequency: 93.7 MHz
- Branding: 93.7 Spirit FM

Programming
- Language: Filipino
- Format: Contemporary MOR, OPM, Religious Radio
- Affiliations: Catholic Media Network

Ownership
- Owner: Apostolic Vicariate of San Jose
- Sister stations: DZVT Radyo Totoo

History
- First air date: June 13, 2007

Technical information
- Licensing authority: NTC
- Power: 1,000 watts
- ERP: 2,500 watts

DZVT (93.7 FM), broadcasting as 93.7 Spirit FM, is a radio station owned and operated by the Apostolic Vicariate of San Jose. The station's studio and transmitter are located in Brgy. Labangan Poblacion, San Jose, Occidental Mindoro.

Last October 26, 2011, the place, which houses DZVT & Spirit FM, was burned by unidentified men.
