= DZNS =

Radyo Totoo Vigan (DZNS)
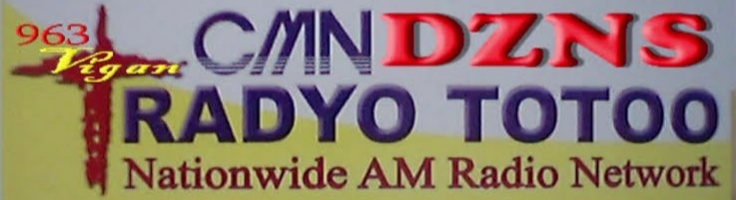
- Vigan; Philippines
- Broadcast area: Ilocos Sur, Abra and surrounding areas
- Frequency: 963 kHz
- Branding: DZNS 963 Radyo Totoo

Programming
- Languages: Ilocano, Filipino
- Format: News, Public Affairs, Talk, Religious Radio
- Affiliations: Catholic Media Network

Ownership
- Owner: Archdiocese of Nueva Segovia

History
- First air date: September 7, 1968
- Call sign meaning: Nueva Segovia

Technical information
- Licensing authority: NTC
- Power: 5,000 watts

Links
- Website: Official Website

DZNS (963 AM) is a radio station in the Philippines owned and operated by the Archdiocese of Nueva Segovia. The station's studio and transmitter are located in Brgy. Pantay Fatima, Vigan.
