= DXDV =

Philippine radio station

Spirit FM Mati (DXDV)
- Mati; Philippines
- Broadcast area: Davao Oriental, parts of Davao de Oro
- Frequency: 97.5 MHz
- Branding: 97.5 Spirit FM

Programming
- Languages: Cebuano, Filipino, English
- Format: Religious Radio
- Affiliations: Catholic Media Network

Ownership
- Owner: Roman Catholic Diocese of Mati
- Sister stations: DXHM

History
- Call sign meaning: Del Verbum

Technical information
- Licensing authority: NTC
- Power: 5,000 watts

DXDV (97.5 FM), broadcasting as 97.5 Spirit FM, is a radio station owned and operated by the Roman Catholic Diocese of Mati. The studio is located inside the St. John of the Cross Clergy, Brgy. Madang, Mati, Davao Oriental.
