= DXMS-AM =

Radio station in Cotabato City, Philippines

Radyo Bida Cotabato (DXMS)
- Cotabato City; Philippines
- Broadcast area: Maguindanao del Norte and surrounding areas
- Frequency: 882 kHz
- Branding: DXMS Radyo Bida 882

Programming
- Languages: Maguindanaon, Filipino
- Format: News, Public Affairs, Talk, Religious Radio
- Network: Radyo Bida

Ownership
- Owner: Notre Dame Broadcasting Corporation
- Sister stations: 92.7 Happy FM

History
- First air date: 1957
- Call sign meaning: Mamamayang Sumasampalataya (former branding)

Technical information
- Licensing authority: NTC
- Power: 5,000 watts

DXMS (882 AM) Radyo Bida is a radio station owned and operated by Notre Dame Broadcasting Corporation, the media arm of the Missionary Oblates of Mary Immaculate. Its studio is located at the Oblate Media Center, Sinsuat Ave., Cotabato City, and its transmitter is located at Notre Dame Village, Cotabato City.

DXMS is the oldest Catholic radio station in the country.

== History ==
DXMS was established by prelate Gerard Mongeau, the first Roman Catholic bishop in the old Cotabato province, in February 1957 as the first radio station of the Oblates of Mary Immaculate, and also the first in the once-undivided province (which now covers the Soccksargen region and the Maguindanao provinces). It became a tool, primarily for evangelization, in the then Diocese of Cotabato.

The station was briefly closed upon the declaration of martial law by President Ferdinand Marcos in 1972. Its sister station, DXND-AM, was later used to be a mouthpiece against the administration.

In 1978, the station, then having a 10-kilowatt power, had its frequency moved from 880 kHz to the present-day 882 kHz.

The station became known for the broadcast of an annual quiz contest.

== Incidents ==
=== 2000 attacks ===
Radio Kalimudan, a nightly blocktime news and cultural affairs program hosted by religious commentator and engineer Datu Zamzamin Ampatuan, was said merely aimed at teaching the Muslims in Central Mindanao to preserve their traditions, and was used to criticize the Islamic extremism, particularly the separatist group Moro Islamic Liberation Front (MILF) for their involvement in violence while pushing the separatism of Mindanao as an Islamic state. Ampatuan later received several death threats, especially from MILF which had strongly objected the airing of the program; the program became the subject of numerous attacks involving the station in 2000.

On February 27, an explosion occurred near the station's gates, at the start of the program. Seven individuals were seriously injured, among them the broadcaster's two escorts and the station's security guard; while only the announcer's van, which was just entered the compound at the time of the incident, was damaged. It was reportedly the third attack against Ampatuan, who had blamed the MILF for a deadly Ozamiz ferry bombing two days earlier. The explosive, a homemade mortar bomb, was reportedly similar to the one used in Ozamiz.

On March 27, Ampatuan was wounded in an assassination attempt when he was ambushed by around 14 armed men while returning home after the program, killing one of his military escorts, and injuring five more as well. Some of the assailants were identified as MILF members.

In early December, the station was assaulted twice. The first was when armed men fired a rocket grenade at the same compound, wounding four bystanders.

On the early morning of December 11, suspected MILF rebels fired an 81 mm mortar on the NDBC relay base, seriously injuring a radio technician and network's business manager, and damaging a storage house and the network's outside broadcast van. The attack was believed to be aimed at the station's transmission tower. A day prior, an anonymous telephone caller warned the employees of bomb attacks unless the DXMS management would drop the program.

The MILF denied responsibility for some of the attacks.
