= Radio Maria Philippines =

Catholic radio station in the Philippines

- Philippines
- Broadcast area: Cagayan Valley, Central Luzon

Programming
- Languages: English, Filipino
- Format: Catholic radio
- Affiliations: Catholic Media Network; The World Family of Radio Maria

Ownership
- Owner: Radio Maria Foundation

History
- Founded: February 11, 2002

Links
- Webcast: Listen Live
- Website: radiomaria.ph

Radio Maria Philippines is the Philippine radio division of The World Family of Radio Maria. The station's main studio is located at Sunrise Subdivision. Barangay Maliwalo, Tarlac City, with broadcasts heard in various parts of Northern and Central Luzon. It operates from 5:30 am to 11:00 pm daily on terrestrial radio, and 24 hours daily on live audio streaming and satellite.

== History ==
Radio Maria Foundation, Inc. was founded on February 11, 2002 by Fr. Melvin P. Castro, backed with Rev. Florentino F. Cinense and The World Family of Radio Maria. In 2007, Radio Maria began broadcasting from Tarlac City.

As part of its expansion, its first repeater was opened in Tuguegarao on June 19, 2010, followed by the second repeater in Santiago, Isabela on February 19, 2011. On January 14, 2016, it inaugurated its third repeater in Olongapo. In March 2018, Radio Maria became available nationwide via Cignal on Channel 315.

== List of Stations ==
Callsign	Frequency	Location
DZRM	99.7 MHz	Tarlac City
DZRD	101.5 MHz	Tuguegarao
DZRC	102.1 MHz	Santiago
DWCX	95.9 MHz	Olongapo

== See also ==
- Catholic Media Network
- Radio Maria
