= DZWM =

- Alaminos; Philippines
- Broadcast area: Pangasinan, parts of La Union and Zambales
- Frequency: 864 kHz
- Branding: DZWM 864

Programming
- Languages: Pangasinense, Filipino
- Format: News, Public Affairs, Talk, Religious Radio
- Affiliations: Catholic Media Network

Ownership
- Owner: Alaminos Community Broadcasting Corporation
- Sister stations: 99.3 Spirit FM

History
- First air date: 1985
- Call sign meaning: Work of Mary

Technical information
- Licensing authority: NTC
- Power: 10,000 watts

DZWM (864 AM) is a radio station owned and operated by Alaminos Community Broadcasting Corporation, the media arm of the Diocese of Alaminos. The station's studio and transmitter are located inside the grounds of St. Joseph Cathedral, Brgy. Poblacion, Alaminos, Pangasinan.
