= DYVW =

Philippine radio station

- Borongan; Philippines
- Broadcast area: Eastern Samar, parts of Samar
- Frequency: 1368 kHz
- Branding: DYVW 1368

Programming
- Languages: Waray, Filipino
- Format: News, Public Affairs, Talk, Religious Radio
- Affiliations: Catholic Media Network

Ownership
- Owner: Voice of the Word Media Network

History
- First air date: 1991 (Original); June 26, 2018 (Relaunch)
- Former frequencies: 1386 kHz (1991–2022)
- Call sign meaning: Voice of the Word

Technical information
- Licensing authority: NTC
- Power: 5,000 watts

DYVW (1368 AM) is a radio station owned and operated by the Voice of the Word Media Network, the media arm of the Diocese of Borongan. The station's studio is located along Baybay Blvd., Brgy. Songco, Borongan.

== History ==
On June 26, 2018, DYVW was reopened after 13 years off the air.
