= Bangued Cathedral =

Roman Catholic church in Abra, Philippines

- Saint James the Elder Cathedral Parish
- Catedral Parroquial de Santiago el Anciano (Spanish)
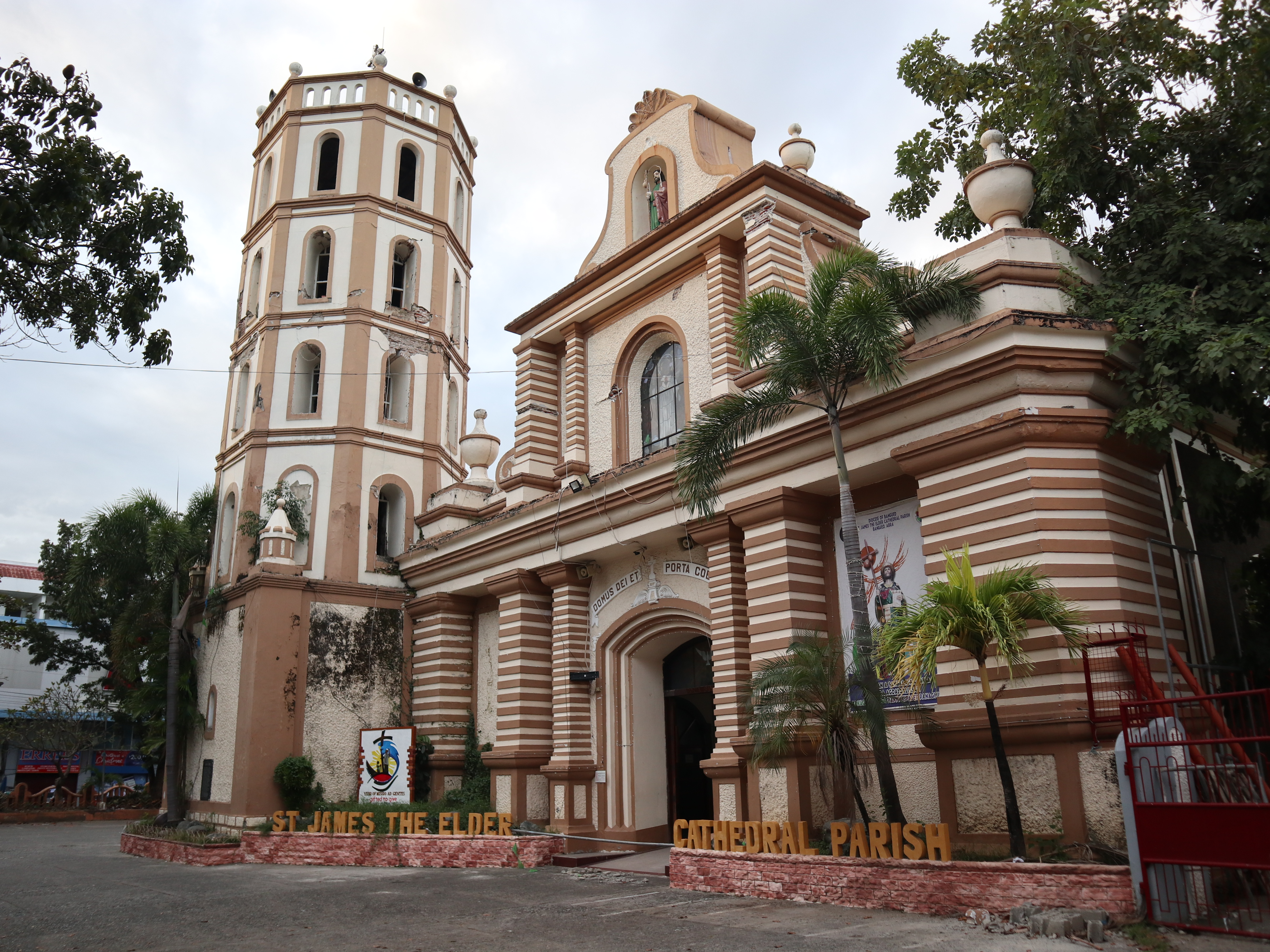
- Cathedral facade and bell tower in 2022

- Location in Luzon Location in the Philippines
- 17°35′45″N 120°37′01″E
- Location: Bangued, Abra
- Country: Philippines
- Denomination: Roman Catholic

History
- Status: Cathedral
- Founded: 1692
- Dedication: Saint James the Elder
- Consecrated: 1692, 1807

Architecture
- Functional status: Active
- Architectural type: Church building
- Style: Baroque
- Groundbreaking: 1722
- Completed: 1807
- Demolished: 1945

Administration
- Archdiocese: Nueva Segovia
- Diocese: Bangued

Clergy
- Bishop: Sede vacante

Saint James the Elder Cathedral Parish, commonly known as Bangued Cathedral, is a cathedral of the Roman Catholic Church in Bangued, Abra, northwestern Philippines. It is situated in Barangay Zone 6 Poblacion (Sinapangan), opposite the town plaza in Bangued. Dedicated to Saint James the Elder, and being the seat of the Bangued Diocese, the church is the heart of Catholic spiritual life in the province of Abra.

== History ==
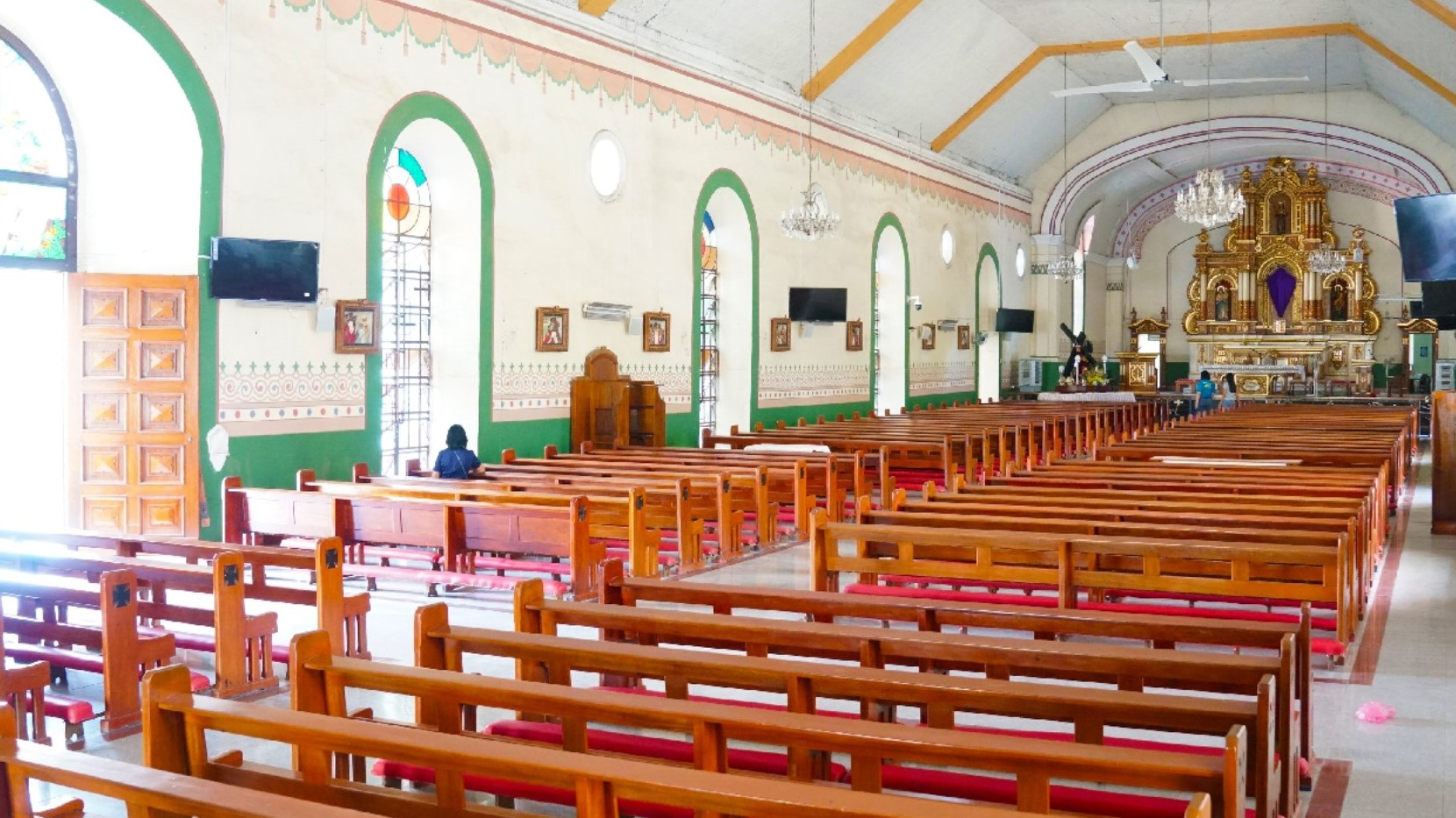
Cathedral interior in 2018

In 1598, a garrison was established by the first Spanish-Iloco forces who first occupied the place now known as Bangued. The said garrison was meant to protect the Spanish missionaries, who at the time aimed to Christianize the natives and locate the goldmines, from headhunters that pillage the community frequently. The word "Bangan", which means roadblocks or blockade, was the source of the name "Bangued". In 1615, the Bangued mission was established and Fr. Juan Pareja baptized 3,000 Tingguians through the help of their chief, Don Manuel Domaoal. Bangued was made an independent mission territory in 1692 by the Augustinians under Fr. Columbo.

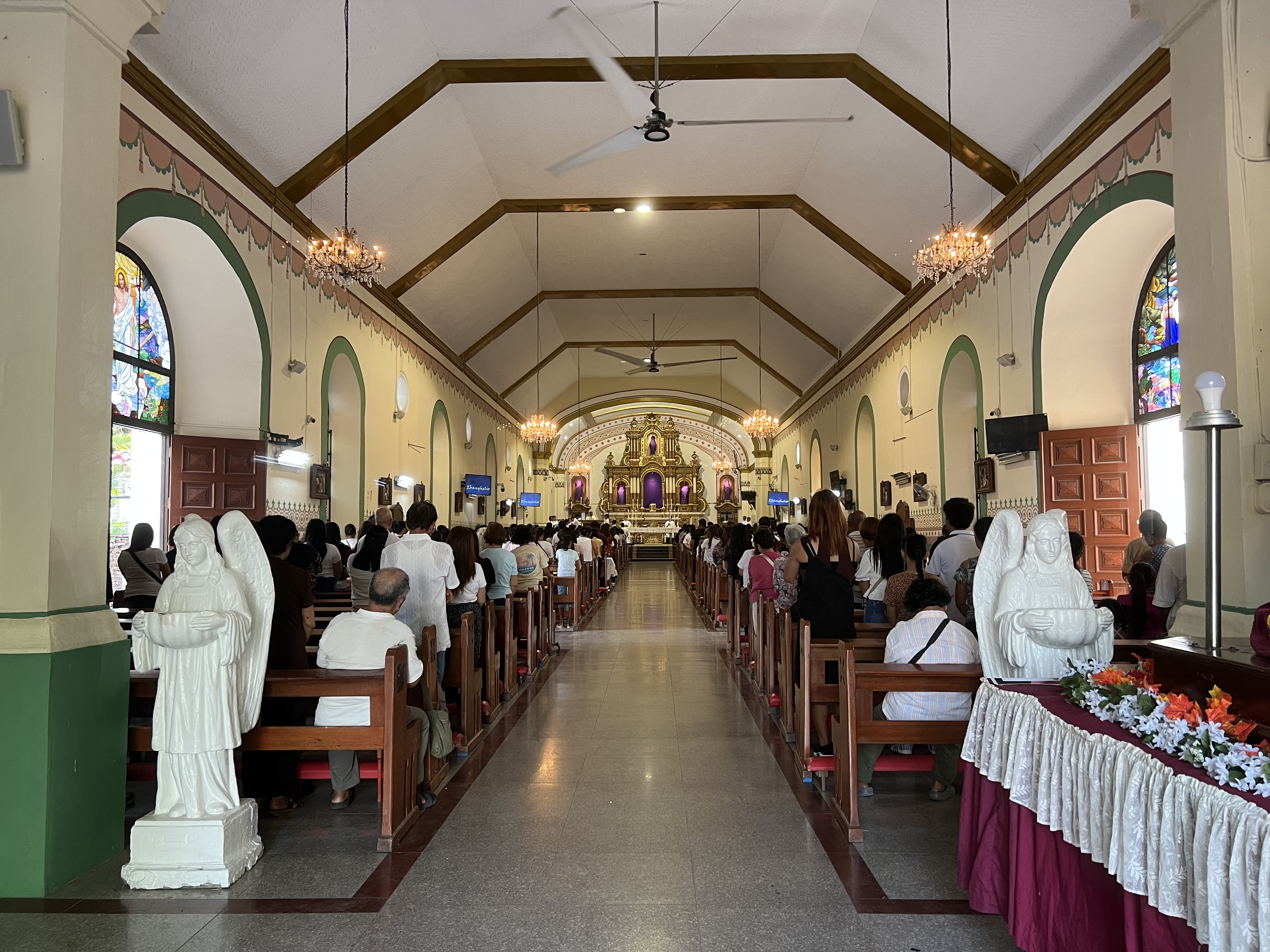
Cathedral nave in 2026

The construction of the big church in Bangued began in 1722 and was completed in 1807. It was about 73 meters long. A spacious convento was built adjoining it. It later became the Sacred Heart of Jesus Academy, which is now the Holy Spirit Academy, a convent for sisters and a school for girls and boys.

In 1861, Bangued was formally inaugurated as a municipality and was proclaimed the capital town of Abra on July 25, the feast day of Saint James the Elder, in 1863. Bangued was returned to the Augustinians after 270 years of secular administration in 1892.

On March 10, 1945, at 3:00 P.M., some American planes guided by Filipinos dropped incendiary bombs on the capitol, the catholic church and adjoining buildings, that resulted in the loss of their records. Only the church walls, convent and the bell tower of the church were spared. The roof and altar reconstruction, and the electric pipe organ installation started in 1947.

In 1955, the church of Bangued became the cathedral of the then newly established Territorial Prelature of Bangued which was elevated into a diocese in 1982.

== Church marker ==
Below is what's written on a marker in front of the cathedral:

"On April 5, 1617, Bangued was created a ministry by the Augustinian friars under the Diocese of Nueva Segovia. This church started construction in 1722 and completed in 1807. On July 25, 1861, the Feast of St. James the Elder, Bangued was proclaimed capital of Abra. After the Philippine Revolution of 1898, the secular clergy took over and in 1920, the Divine Word Missionaries. During World War II, on March 10, 1945, American warplanes bombed the church and the adjoining Colegio del Sagrado Corazon then used as military hospital by Japanese forces. The original altar was destroyed, only the walls and tower remained. In 1947, the Church was reconstructed. On July 25, 1955, it was proclaimed Cathedral when Abra was made Prelature Nullius. In 1976, the Parish handed to the Diocesan clergy."
