= DXMW =

Unitas Radio
Tandag; Philippines
- Broadcast area: Surigao del Sur
- Frequency: 103.1 MHz
- Branding: Unitas Radio 103.1

Programming
- Language: Filipino
- Format: Religious radio
- Affiliations: Catholic Media Network

Ownership
- Owner: Roman Catholic Diocese of Tandag; (Catholic Bishops' Conference of the Philippines)

History
- First air date: October 15, 2024

Technical information
- Licensing authority: NTC
- Power: 5 Kw

Unitas Radio 103.1 (DXMW 103.1 MHz) is an FM station owned and operated by Roman Catholic Diocese of Tandag. Its studios and transmitter are located at Pastoral Center, Brgy. Mabua, Tandag. The frequency is formerly owned by Palawan Broadcasting Corporation.
