= DZRV-FM =

Philippine radio station

Spirit FM Nueva Vizcaya (DZRV)
- Bayombong; Philippines
- Broadcast area: Nueva Vizcaya and surrounding areas
- Frequency: 90.1 MHz
- Branding: 90.1 Spirit FM

Programming
- Languages: Ilocano, Filipino
- Format: Contemporary MOR, OPM, Religious Radio
- Affiliations: Catholic Media Network

Ownership
- Owner: Diocese of Bayombong; (Global Broadcasting System)
- Sister stations: DWRV Radyo Veritas

History
- First air date: June 30, 2000
- Former call signs: DZRV
- Call sign meaning: Radio Veritas

Technical information
- Licensing authority: NTC
- Power: 5 kW

90.1 Spirit FM (DZRV 90.1 MHz) is an FM station owned and operated by the Diocese of Bayombong in the Philippines. Its studios and transmitter are located along Maharlika Hi-way, Brgy. Luyang, Bayombong.
