= DXMM-AM =

Radio station in Sulu, Philippines

DXMM
- Jolo; Philippines
- Broadcast area: Sulu
- Frequency: 927 kHz
- Branding: DXMM 927

Programming
- Languages: Tausug, Filipino
- Format: News, Public Affairs, Talk, Religious Radio
- Affiliations: Catholic Media Network

Ownership
- Owner: Sulu-Tawi-Tawi Broadcasting Foundation

History
- Former frequencies: 549 kHz
- Call sign meaning: Mother Mary

Technical information
- Licensing authority: NTC
- Power: 1,000 watts

DXMM (927 AM) is a radio station owned and operated by Sulu-Tawi-Tawi Broadcasting Foundation, the media arm of the Apostolic Vicariate of Jolo. The station's studio is located at Kasulutan Village, Brgy. Gandasuli, Jolo, Sulu.
