= DWRV-FM =

Radio station in Naga, Camarines Sur, Philippines

Radio Caritas Mariae (DWRV)
Naga; Philippines
- Broadcast area: Camarines Sur and surrounding areas
- Frequency: 98.3 MHz
- RDS: RCM 98.3
- Branding: Radio Caritas Mariae 98.3

Programming
- Languages: Bicolano, Filipino, English
- Format: Religious Radio
- Affiliations: Catholic Media Network

Ownership
- Owner: Franciscan Friars of the Immaculate; (Global Broadcasting System)

History
- First air date: January 20, 1996
- Call sign meaning: Radio Veritas

Technical information
- Licensing authority: NTC
- Power: 5,000 watts
- ERP: 25,000 watts

Links
- Webcast: Listen Live; Listen Live 2
- Website: Official Website

DWRV (98.3 FM), broadcasting as Radio Caritas Mariae 98.3, is a radio station owned and operated by the Franciscan Friars of the Immaculate under Global Broadcasting System. The station's studios and transmitter are located at the Franciscan Friars of the Immaculate Friary, KM 4 Pacol Rd., Brgy. San Felipe, Naga, Camarines Sur.
