= DYKA-FM =

Philippine radio station

Spirit FM Antique (DYKA)
- San Jose de Buenavista; Philippines
- Broadcast area: Southern Antique, Western Iloilo
- Frequency: 94.1 MHz
- Branding: 94.1 Spirit FM

Programming
- Languages: Karay-a, Filipino
- Format: Contemporary MOR, OPM, Religious
- Affiliations: Catholic Media Network

Ownership
- Owner: Kauswagan Broadcasting Corporation
- Sister stations: DYKA Radyo Totoo

History
- First air date: 1997
- Call sign meaning: Kauswagan Antique

Technical information
- Licensing authority: NTC
- Power: 5,000 watts

Links
- Website: http://www.941spiritfm.com/

DYKA (94.1 FM), broadcasting as 94.1 Spirit FM, is a radio station owned and operated by Kauswagan Broadcasting Corporation, the media arm of the Diocese of San Jose de Antique. Its studio and transmitter are located at 3/F St.Joseph Center, Gen. Fullon St., San Jose de Buenavista.
