= DYKA-AM =

Philippine radio station

Radyo Totoo Antique (DYKA)
- San Jose de Buenavista; Philippines
- Broadcast area: Southern Antique, Western Iloilo
- Frequency: 801 kHz
- Branding: DYKA 801 Radyo Totoo

Programming
- Languages: Karay-a, Filipino
- Format: News, Public Affairs, Talk, Religious
- Affiliations: Catholic Media Network

Ownership
- Owner: Kauswagan Broadcasting Corporation
- Sister stations: 94.1 Spirit FM

History
- First air date: May 1, 1972
- Former frequencies: 800 kHz (1972–1978)
- Call sign meaning: Kauswagan Antique

Technical information
- Licensing authority: NTC
- Power: 5,000 watts

Links
- Website: http://www.941spiritfm.com/index.php/dyka

DYKA (801 AM) Radyo Totoo is a radio station owned and operated by Kauswagan Broadcasting Corporation, the media arm of the Diocese of San Jose de Antique. Its studio is located at 3/F St.Joseph Center, Gen. Fullon St., San Jose de Buenavista and its transmitter is located at Brgy. Malandog, Hamtic.
