= DXDD-FM =

Radio station in Misamis Occidental, Philippines

Cool Radio (DXDD)
- Ozamiz; Philippines
- Broadcast area: Misamis Occidental
- Frequency: 100.7 MHz
- Branding: 100.7 Cool Radio

Programming
- Languages: English, Filipino, Cebuano
- Format: CHR/Top 40, Talk
- Affiliations: Catholic Media Network

Ownership
- Owner: Dan-ag sa Dakbayan Broadcasting Corporation; (Catholic Bishops Conference of the Philippines)
- Sister stations: DXDD Radyo Kampana

History
- First air date: January 18, 1980
- Call sign meaning: Dan-ag sa Dakbayan

Technical information
- Licensing authority: NTC
- Power: 5 kW

Links
- Website: coolradio1007.blogspot.com

Cool Radio 100.7 (DXDD 100.7 MHz) is an FM station owned and operated by Dan-ag sa Dakbayan Broadcasting Corporation, the media arm of the Archdiocese of Ozamis. The station's studio is located at the 3rd Flr., New DXDD Bldg., Rizal Ave., Ozamiz, and its transmitter is located at St. Joseph Compound, Brgy. Tinago, Ozamiz.

The station used to air a Contemporary MOR format from the 90s until 2005, when it switched to Top 40.
