= DXND-AM =

Philippine radio station

Radyo Bida Kidapawan (DXND)
- Kidapawan; Philippines
- Broadcast area: Eastern Cotabato and surrounding areas
- Frequency: 747 kHz
- Branding: DXND Radyo Bida

Programming
- Languages: Cebuano, Filipino
- Format: News, Public Affairs, Talk, Religious Radio
- Network: Radyo Bida
- Affiliations: Catholic Media Network

Ownership
- Owner: Notre Dame Broadcasting Corporation
- Sister stations: 88.7 Happy FM

History
- First air date: August 22, 1964
- Call sign meaning: Notre Dame

Technical information
- Licensing authority: NTC
- Power: 10,000 watts

DXND (747 AM) Radyo Bida is a radio station owned and operated by Notre Dame Broadcasting Corporation. It serves as the flagship station of Radyo Bida. The station's studio and transmitter are located at DXND Bldg., Maharlika Highway, Kidapawan.

== Incidents ==
On January 28, 1991, at 2:45 a.m., a grenade explosion occurred at the station. The station manager reported that a night prior, they received a call warning reporters to stop discussing issues related to illegal gambling. The incident, along with another which was happened almost two hours earlier at another radio station in Legazpi, Albay, was believed related to the Persian Gulf War.
