= Notre Dame Broadcasting Corporation =

Philippine media network

Notre Dame Broadcasting Corporation (NDBC)
- Type: Private
- Industry: Radio network
- Founded: 1956
- Founder: Bishop Gerard Mongeau
- Headquarters: NDBC Business Center: Kidapawan City, North Cotabato, Philippines; NDBC Media Marketing Office: Makati City, Metro Manila, Philippines
- Key people: Fr. Rogelio Tabuada, CEO
- Owner: Missionary Oblates of Mary Immaculate - Philippine province
- Divisions: NDBC Media Marketing; NDBC News
- Website: NDBC.com.ph

Notre Dame Broadcasting Corporation (NDBC) is a radio network based in Kidapawan. It is an affiliate of Catholic Media Network.

== Awards ==
The network won two awards in the audio category at the International Committee of the Red Cross Human Reporting Awards in 2013 for two features: Tudok Firiz: Meketefu and Mga Bakwit: TNT (Takbo-ng-Takbo) sa Maguindanao.

In 2013 the network also won two national journalism awards from the Philippines Department of Health for health reporting.

In 2014 the station won three Golden Dove Awards from the Kapisanan ng mga Brodkaster ng Pilipinas for Best Radio Documentary Program, Best Radio Special Program and Best Science and Technology program host, as well as nominations for Best Public Affairs Service program host, and Best Radio Public Service Announcement. It was also awarded Best Agriculture Radio segment at the Bright Leaf Agriculture Journalism Awards.

In 2015 the station's weekly peace segment won an award from the Catholic Mass Media Association.

== Radio stations ==
=== Radyo Bida ===
Branding	Callsign	Frequency	Location
Radyo Bida Kidapawan	DXND	747 kHz	Kidapawan
Radyo Bida Cotabato	DXMS	882 kHz	Cotabato
Radyo Bida Koronadal	DXOM	963 kHz	Koronadal

=== Happy FM ===
Branding	Callsign	Frequency	Location
Happy FM Kidapawan	DXDM	88.7 MHz	Kidapawan
Happy FM Cotabato	DXOL	92.7 MHz	Cotabato
Happy FM Koronadal	DXOM	91.7 MHz	Koronadal
