= DXOL =

Radio station in Cotabato City, Philippines

Happy FM Cotabato (DXOL)
- Cotabato City; Philippines
- Broadcast area: Maguindanao del Norte and surrounding areas
- Frequency: 92.7 MHz
- Branding: 92.7 Happy FM

Programming
- Languages: Maguindanaon, Filipino
- Format: Contemporary MOR, OPM
- Network: Happy FM

Ownership
- Owner: Notre Dame Broadcasting Corporation
- Sister stations: DXMS Radyo Bida

History
- First air date: July 24, 1987
- Call sign meaning: Our Lady of Mary Immaculate

Technical information
- Licensing authority: NTC
- Power: 5,000 watts

Links
- Website: http://www.dxol.webs.com/

DXOL (92.7 FM), broadcasting as 92.7 Happy FM, is a radio station owned and operated by Notre Dame Broadcasting Corporation, the media arm of the Missionary Oblates of Mary Immaculate. Its studio is located along Sinsuat Ave., Cotabato City. Established in 1987, DXOL is the pioneer FM station in the city.
