= DWBL-FM =

Radio station in Pampanga, Philippines

Bright FM (DWBL)
- San Fernando; Philippines
- Broadcast area: Pampanga and surrounding areas
- Frequency: 91.9 MHz
- Branding: 91.9 Bright FM

Programming
- Languages: Kapampangan, Filipino
- Format: Religious Radio
- Affiliations: Catholic Media Network

Ownership
- Owner: Roman Catholic Archdiocese of San Fernando

History
- First air date: 2010
- Call sign meaning: Bright Light Broadcasting Service (former owner)

Technical information
- Licensing authority: NTC
- Power: 1,000 watts

Links
- Webcast: Listen Live
- Website: Bright FM

DWBL (91.9 FM), broadcasting as 91.9 Bright FM, is a radio station owned and operated by the Roman Catholic Archdiocese of San Fernando. Its studio and transmitter are located at the 4th Floor, DSF Building, Gen. Hizon Avenue, San Fernando, Pampanga.

It was formerly owned by Bright Light Broadcasting Service until September 7, 2015, when it was acquired by the Archdiocese of San Fernando. It is currently a member of the Catholic Media Network.
