= DXOM-AM =

Radio station in South Cotabato, Philippines

Radyo Bida Koronadal (DXOM)
- Koronadal; Philippines
- Broadcast area: South Central Mindanao
- Frequency: 963 kHz
- Branding: DXOM Radyo Bida 963

Programming
- Languages: Hiligaynon, Filipino
- Format: News, Public Affairs, Talk, Religious Radio
- Network: Radyo Bida
- Affiliations: Catholic Media Network

Ownership
- Owner: Notre Dame Broadcasting Corporation
- Sister stations: 91.7 Happy FM

History
- First air date: December 7, 2014
- Call sign meaning: Oblates of Mary

Technical information
- Licensing authority: NTC
- Power: 10,000 watts

DXOM (963 AM) Radyo Bida is a radio station owned and operated by the Notre Dame Broadcasting Corporation. The station's studio is located at the NDBC Bldg., General Santos Dr., Koronadal, while its transmitter is located at Roxas Mountain Range, Brgy. Paraiso, Koronadal.
