= Antonio Palang =

Filipino bishop (1943–2021)

Antonio Palang SVD
- Vicar Apostolic of San Jose in Mindoro
- Church: Catholic Church
- See: Apostolic Vicariate of San Jose in Mindoro
- In office: 25 March 2002 – 17 March 2018
- Other post: Titular Bishop of Thuburbo Minus (2002-2021)

Orders
- Ordination: 8 July 1972
- Consecration: 31 May 2002 by Antonio Franco

Personal details
- Born: 13 June 1946 Cebu, Commonwealth of the Philippines
- Died: 21 April 2021 (aged 74) Cebu, Philippines

Antonio Pepito Palang (13 June 1943 – 21 April 2021) was a Filipino Roman Catholic bishop.

Palang was born in the Philippines and was ordained to the priesthood in 1972. He served as the titular bishop of Thuburbo Minus and as the bishop of the Apostolic Vicariate of San Jose in Mindoro, Philippines, from 2002 to 2018.

Palang died from COVID-19 in 2021.
