= DWRV-AM =

Philippine radio station

Radyo Veritas Nueva Vizcaya (DWRV)
- Bayombong; Philippines
- Broadcast area: Nueva Vizcaya and Quirino
- Frequency: 1233 kHz
- Branding: DWRV 1233 Radyo Veritas

Programming
- Languages: Ilocano, Filipino
- Format: News, Public Affairs, Talk, Religious Radio
- Affiliations: Catholic Media Network

Ownership
- Owner: Diocese of Bayombong; (Global Broadcasting System)
- Sister stations: 90.1 Spirit FM

History
- First air date: March 4, 1995
- Call sign meaning: Radio Veritas

Technical information
- Licensing authority: NTC
- Power: 5,000 watts

Links
- Website: www.catholicmedianetwork.com/station/dwrv-am-1233khz

DWRV (1233 AM) Radyo Veritas is a radio station owned and operated by the Diocese of Bayombong under Global Broadcasting System. The station's studio and transmitter are located along Maharlika Hi-way, Brgy. Luyang, Bayombong.
