= USS LST-909 =

1944 LST-542-class tank landing ship

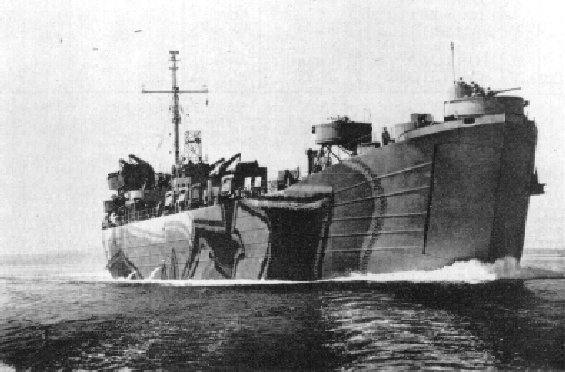
- USS LST-909 underway, 12 May 1944, location unknown

History

United States
- Name: LST-909
- Builder: Bethlehem-Hingham Shipyard, Hingham, Massachusetts
- Yard number: 3379
- Laid down: 19 February 1944
- Launched: 3 April 1944
- Commissioned: 11 May 1944
- Decommissioned: 21 June 1946
- Stricken: 31 July 1946
- Identification: Hull symbol: LST-909; Code letters: NVPW
- Honors and awards: 2 × battle star
- Fate: Sold for scrapping, 19 May 1948

General characteristics
- Class & type: LST-542-class tank landing ship
- Displacement: 1,625 long tons (1,651 t) (light); 4,080 long tons (4,145 t) (full (seagoing draft with 1,675 short tons (1,520 t) load); 2,366 long tons (2,404 t) (beaching)
- Length: 328 ft (100 m) oa
- Beam: 50 ft (15 m)
- Draft: Unloaded: 2 ft 4 in (0.71 m) forward; 7 ft 6 in (2.29 m) aft; Full load: 8 ft 3 in (2.51 m) forward; 14 ft 1 in (4.29 m) aft; Landing with 500 short tons (450 t) load: 3 ft 11 in (1.19 m) forward; 9 ft 10 in (3.00 m) aft; Limiting 11 ft 2 in (3.40 m); Maximum navigation 14 ft 1 in (4.29 m)
- Installed power: 2 × 900 hp (670 kW) Electro-Motive Diesel 12-567A diesel engines; 1,800 shp (1,300 kW)
- Propulsion: 1 × Falk main reduction gears; 2 × Propellers
- Speed: 11.6 kn (21.5 km/h; 13.3 mph)
- Range: 24,000 nmi (44,000 km; 28,000 mi) at 9 kn (17 km/h; 10 mph) while displacing 3,960 long tons (4,024 t)
- Boats & landing craft carried: 2 x LCVPs
- Capacity: 1,600–1,900 short tons (3,200,000–3,800,000 lb; 1,500,000–1,700,000 kg) cargo depending on mission
- Troops: 16 officers, 147 enlisted men
- Complement: 13 officers, 104 enlisted men
- Armament: Varied, ultimate armament; 2 × twin 40 mm (1.57 in) Bofors guns; 4 × single 40 mm Bofors guns; 12 × 20 mm (0.79 in) Oerlikon cannons

Service record
- Part of: LST Flotilla 14
- Operations: Lingayen Gulf landings (4–18 January 1945); Assault and occupation of Okinawa Gunto (1–15 April 1945)
- Awards: American Campaign Medal; Asiatic–Pacific Campaign Medal; World War II Victory Medal; Navy Occupation Service Medal w/Asia Clasp; Philippine Republic Presidential Unit Citation; Philippine Liberation Medal

USS LST-909 was an LST-542-class tank landing ship in the United States Navy. Like many of her class, she was not named and is properly referred to by her hull designation.

== Construction ==
LST-909 was laid down on 19 February 1944, at Hingham, Massachusetts, by the Bethlehem-Hingham Shipyard; launched on 3 April 1944; and commissioned on 11 May 1944.

== Service history ==
During World War II, LST-909 was assigned to the Asiatic-Pacific theater. She took part in the Luzon operation, the Lingayen Gulf landings, in January 1945; and the Assault and occupation of Okinawa Gunto, in April 1945.

Immediately following World War II, LST-909 performed occupation duty in the Far East until early February 1946. She returned to the United States and was decommissioned on 21 June 1946, and struck from the Navy list on 31 July, that same year. On 19 May 1948, the ship was sold to Kaiser Shipyards, Vancouver, Washington, for scrapping.

== Awards ==
LST-909 earned two battle star for World War II service.

== Bibliography ==
Online resources

- "LST-909". Dictionary of American Naval Fighting Ships. Naval History and Heritage Command. This article incorporates text from this source, which is in the public domain.
- "Bethlehem-Hingham, Hingham MA". www.ShipbuildingHistory.com. 11 August 2011.
- "USS LST-909". NavSource. 26 September 2015.
