= DXDD-AM =

Philippine radio station

Radyo Kampana (DXDD)
Ozamiz; Philippines
- Broadcast area: Misamis Occidental and surrounding areas
- Frequency: 657 kHz
- Branding: DXDD 657 Radyo Kampana

Programming
- Languages: Cebuano, Filipino
- Format: News, Public Affairs, Talk, Religious Radio
- Affiliations: Catholic Media Network

Ownership
- Owner: Dan-ag sa Dakbayan Broadcasting Corporation; (Catholic Bishops Conference of the Philippines)
- Sister stations: 100.7 Cool Radio

History
- First air date: February 15, 1970
- Call sign meaning: Dan-ag sa Dakbayan

Technical information
- Licensing authority: NTC
- Power: 5,000 watts

Links
- Website: https://dxddkampana657.blogspot.com/

DXDD (657 AM) Radyo Kampana is a radio station owned and operated by Dan-ag sa Dakbayan Broadcasting Corporation, the media arm of the Archdiocese of Ozamis. The station's studio is located at the 3rd Flr., New DXDD Bldg., Rizal Ave., Ozamiz, and its transmitter is located at St. Joseph Compound, Brgy. Tinago, Ozamiz.

DXDD can be seen on TV via DXDD Radio-Television, seen on both Fil Products Ozamiz (Channel 18) and Misamis Cable (Channel 19).
