= Aeroflot Flight 909 =

1976 aviation accident

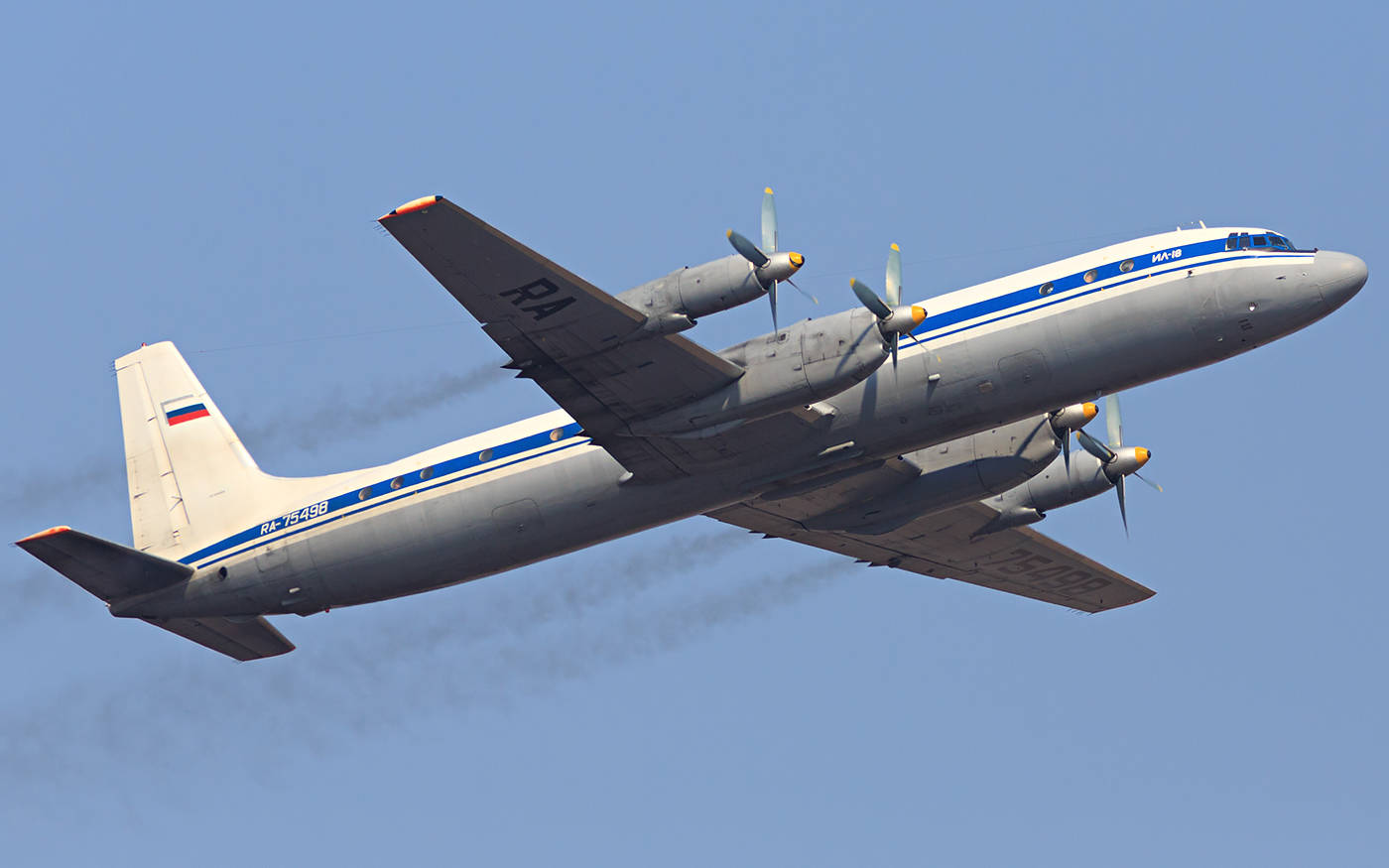
- An Il-18 similar to the accident aircraft.

Accident
- Date: 6 March 1976
- Summary: Loss of control following electrical failure
- Site: Near Verkhnyaya Khava, Voronezh Oblast, Soviet Union
- Total fatalities: 118

Aircraft
- Aircraft type: Ilyushin Il-18E
- Operator: Aeroflot
- Registration: CCCP-75408
- Flight origin: Moskva-Vnukovo Airport
- Destination: Yerevan Airport
- Passengers: 100
- Crew: 11
- Fatalities: 111
- Missing: 111
- Survivors: 0

Ground casualties
- Ground fatalities: 7

Aeroflot Flight 909 was a scheduled domestic flight overnight on 5–6 March 1976 flown by Ilyushin Il-18E registered CCCP-74508. The aircraft lost control following an electrical failure and crashed near Voronezh in the Soviet Union. All 111 on board were killed, including 7 on the ground, making it the deadliest plane crash in Russia.

== Accident ==
The aircraft was on a domestic passenger flight between Moscow and Yerevan at flight level 260 (about 26,000 feet (7,900 m)) when an electrical failure disabled some of the aircraft instruments including the compass and the two main gyros. It was 00:58 in the dark and according to the official version without a natural horizon due to clouds the crew became confused on the orientation of the aircraft and control was lost and the aircraft crashed killing all on board. Some reports show that seven were killed on the ground.

== Aircraft ==
The aircraft was a four-engined Ilyushin Il-18E turboprop built in 1966.
