= DXOM-FM =

Radio station in South Cotabato, Philippines

Happy FM Koronadal (DXOM)
- Koronadal; Philippines
- Broadcast area: Northern South Cotabato and Sultan Kudarat
- Frequency: 91.7 MHz
- Branding: 91.7 Happy FM

Programming
- Languages: Hiligaynon, Filipino
- Format: Contemporary MOR, OPM
- Network: Happy FM

Ownership
- Owner: Notre Dame Broadcasting Corporation
- Sister stations: DXOM Radyo Bida

History
- First air date: July 30, 1993
- Former names: Hot Radio (1998-2012)
- Call sign meaning: Oblates of Mary

Technical information
- Licensing authority: NTC
- Power: 5,000 watts
- ERP: 10,500 watts

DXOM (91.7 FM), broadcasting as 91.7 Happy FM, is a radio station owned by the Notre Dame Broadcasting Corporation in the Philippines. Its studios are located at the NDBC Bldg., General Santos Drive, Koronadal, while its transmitter is located at Roxas Mountain Range, Brgy. Paraiso, Koronadal. Launched on July 30, 1993, DXOM is the pioneer FM station in the city.
