= DZEA-AM =

Philippine radio station

Radyo Totoo Laoag (DZEA)

Laoag; Philippines
- Broadcast area: Ilocos Norte and surrounding areas
- Frequency: 909 kHz
- Branding: DZEA Radyo Totoo

Programming
- Languages: Ilocano, Filipino
- Format: News, Public Affairs, Talk, Religious Radio
- Affiliations: Catholic Media Network

Ownership
- Owner: Roman Catholic Diocese of Laoag; (Catholic Bishops Conference of the Philippines)

History
- First air date: April 11, 1991
- Call sign meaning: Bishop Edmundo Abaya

Technical information
- Licensing authority: NTC
- Power: 10,000 watts

DZEA (909 AM) Radyo Totoo is a station owned and operated by the Roman Catholic Diocese of Laoag. The station's studio and transmitter are located at Brgy. Nalbo, Laoag.
