= Diocese of Bangued =

Latin Catholic diocese in the Philippines

Coordinates: 17.5957°N 120.6170°E

Diocese of Bangued Dioecesis Banguedensis Diocesis ti Bangued Diyosesis ng Bangued

Catholic
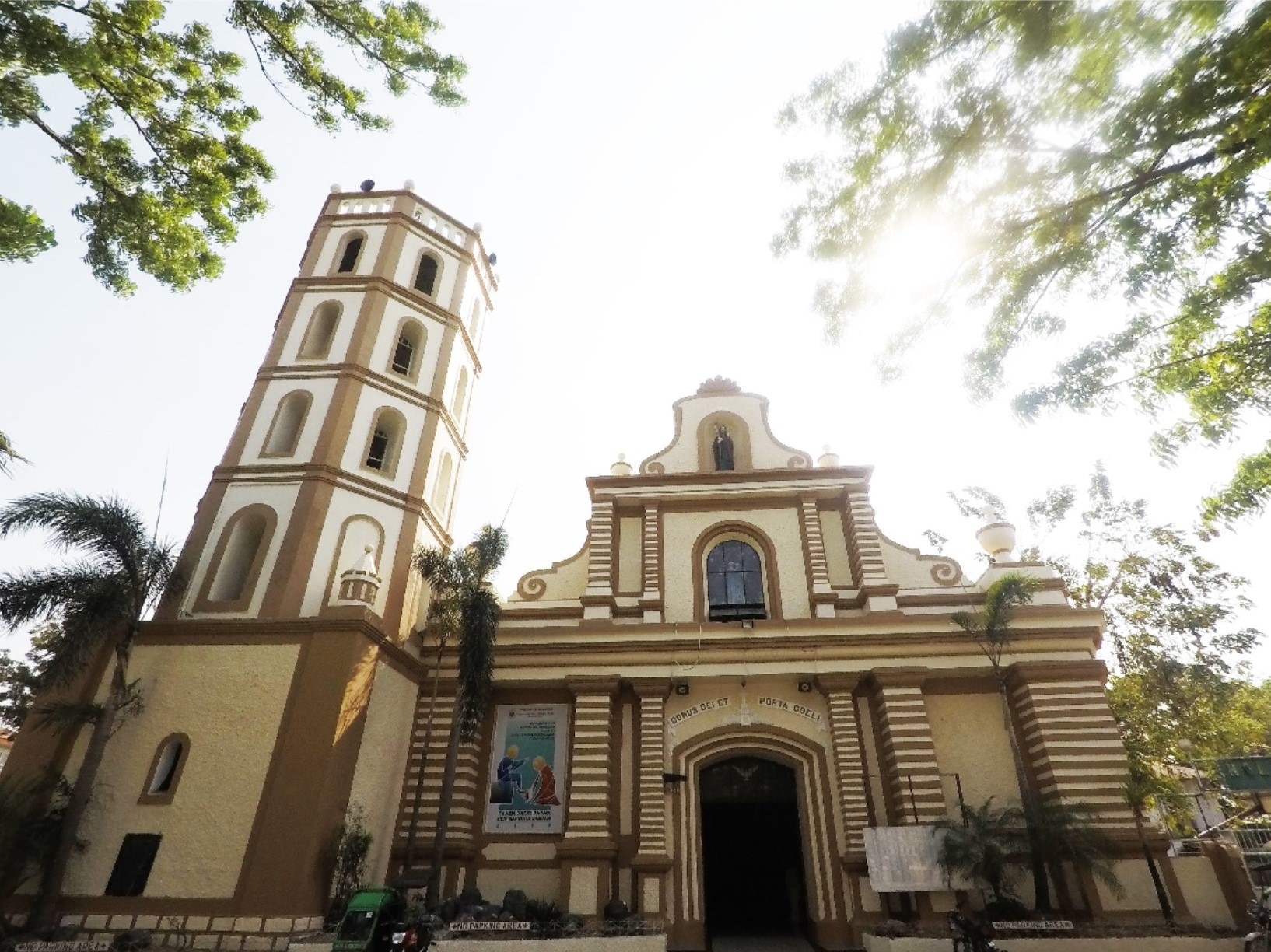
- Bangued Cathedral

- Coat of arms

Location
- Country: Philippines
- Territory: Abra
- Ecclesiastical province: Nueva Segovia

Statistics
- Area: 3,975 km^{2} (1,535 sq mi)
- Population: Total; Catholics: (as of 2021); 271,081; 225,637 (83.2%)
- Parishes: 24

Information
- Denomination: Catholic Church
- Sui iuris church: Latin Church
- Rite: Roman Rite
- Established: June 12, 1955 (Territorial Prelature); November 15, 1982 (Diocese)
- Cathedral: Cathedral of St James the Elder
- Patron saint: James the Great
- Secular priests: 25

Current leadership
- Pope: Leo XIV
- Bishop: Sede Vacante
- Metropolitan Archbishop: David William Antonio
- Vicar General: Pablo Nilo Peig
- Bishops emeritus: Leopoldo Jaucian

The Diocese of Bangued (Lat: Dioecesis Banguedensis) is a Latin Church ecclesiastical province or diocese of the Catholic Church in the Philippines.

== History ==
- June 12, 1955: Established as territorial prelature
- November 15, 1982: Promoted to diocese and became suffragan to the Archdiocese of Nueva Segovia.

== Coat of arms ==
The pilgrim's staff and the two scallops are the most popular symbols of Saint James the Great, the titular of the cathedral. The blue (azure) wavy pale represents the Abra River. The mountains and green (vert) fields represent the mountainous province of Abra.

== Ordinaries ==
Ordinaries of the Diocese of Bangued
| No. | Portrait | Name | Coat of Arms | From | Until | Duration | Notes |
Prelates of Bangued (August 20, 1956 – November 15, 1982)
| 1 | | Odilo Etspueler, S.V.D. 1912–1995 | | 20 Aug 1956 | 15 Nov 1982 | 26 years, 2 months, 26 days | First Prelate of Bangued; later elevated as bishop. |
Bishops of Bangued (November 15, 1982 – present)
| 1 | | Odilo Etspueler, S.V.D. 1912–1995 | | 15 Nov 1982 | 20 Nov 1987 | 5 years, 5 days | Elevated as first bishop of Bangued upon its promotion from territorial prelature. |
| 2 | | Cesar C. Raval, S.V.D. 1924–2017 | | 25 Nov 1988 | 18 Jan 1992 | 3 years, 1 month, 24 days | Retired. |
| 3 | | Artemio L. Rillera, S.V.D. 1942–2011 | | 28 Jun 1993 | 1 Apr 2005 | 11 years, 9 months, 4 days | Appointed Bishop of San Fernando de La Union. |
| 4 | | Leopoldo C. Jaucian, S.V.D. 1960– | | 5 Jan 2007 | 7 Nov 2026 | 19 years, 10 months, 2 days | Resigned. |

=== Auxiliary Bishop ===
Auxiliary Bishops of the Diocese of Bangued
| No. | Portrait | Name | Coat of Arms | From | Until | Duration | Notes |
|---|---|---|---|---|---|---|---|
| 1 | | Cesar Castro Raval, S.V.D. 1924–2017 | | 15 Dec 1981 | 25 Nov 1988 | 6 years, 11 months, 10 days | Later appointed as Bishop of Bangued. |

== Notable Churches ==
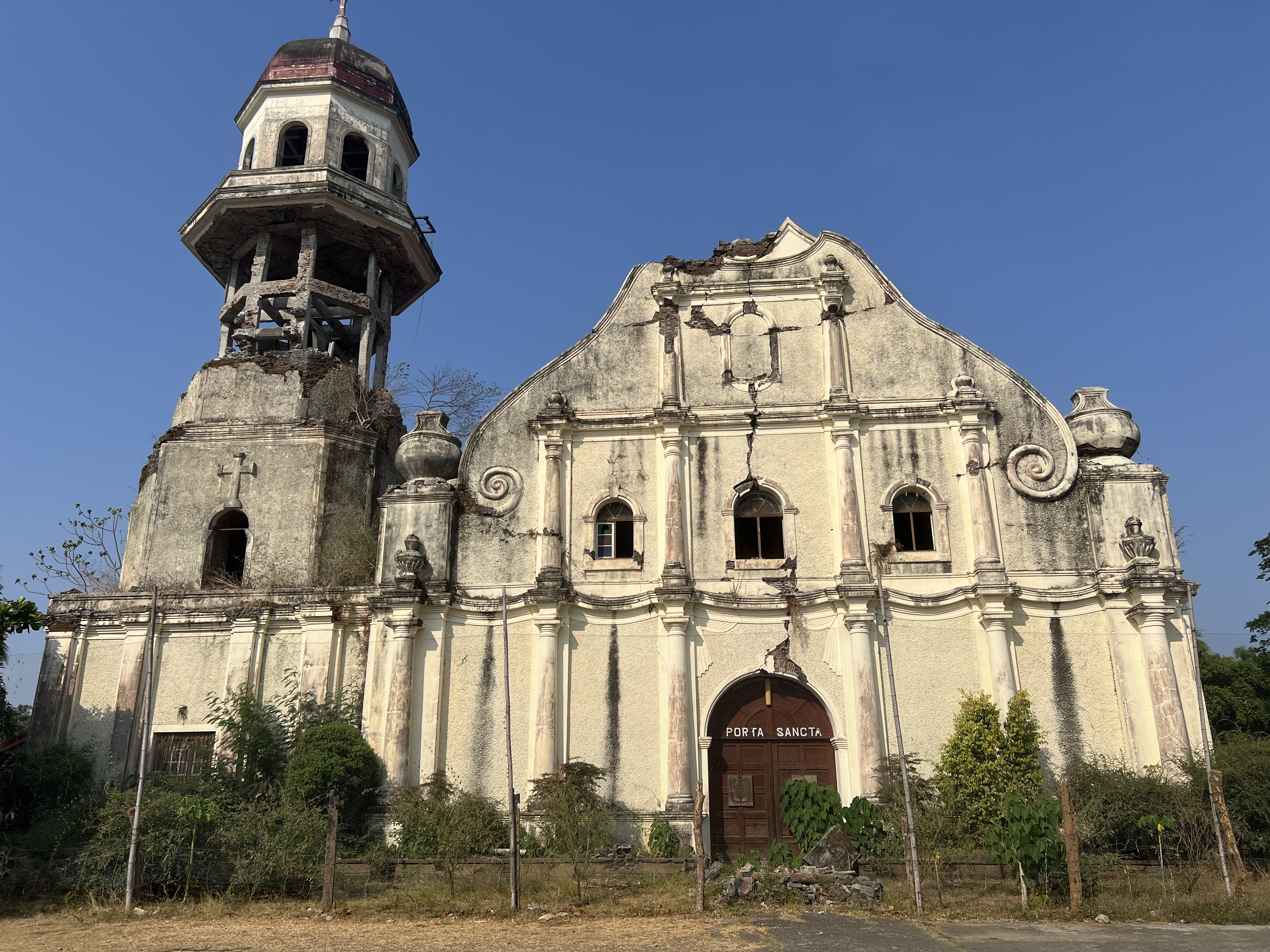
St. Catherine of Alexandria (Tayum)

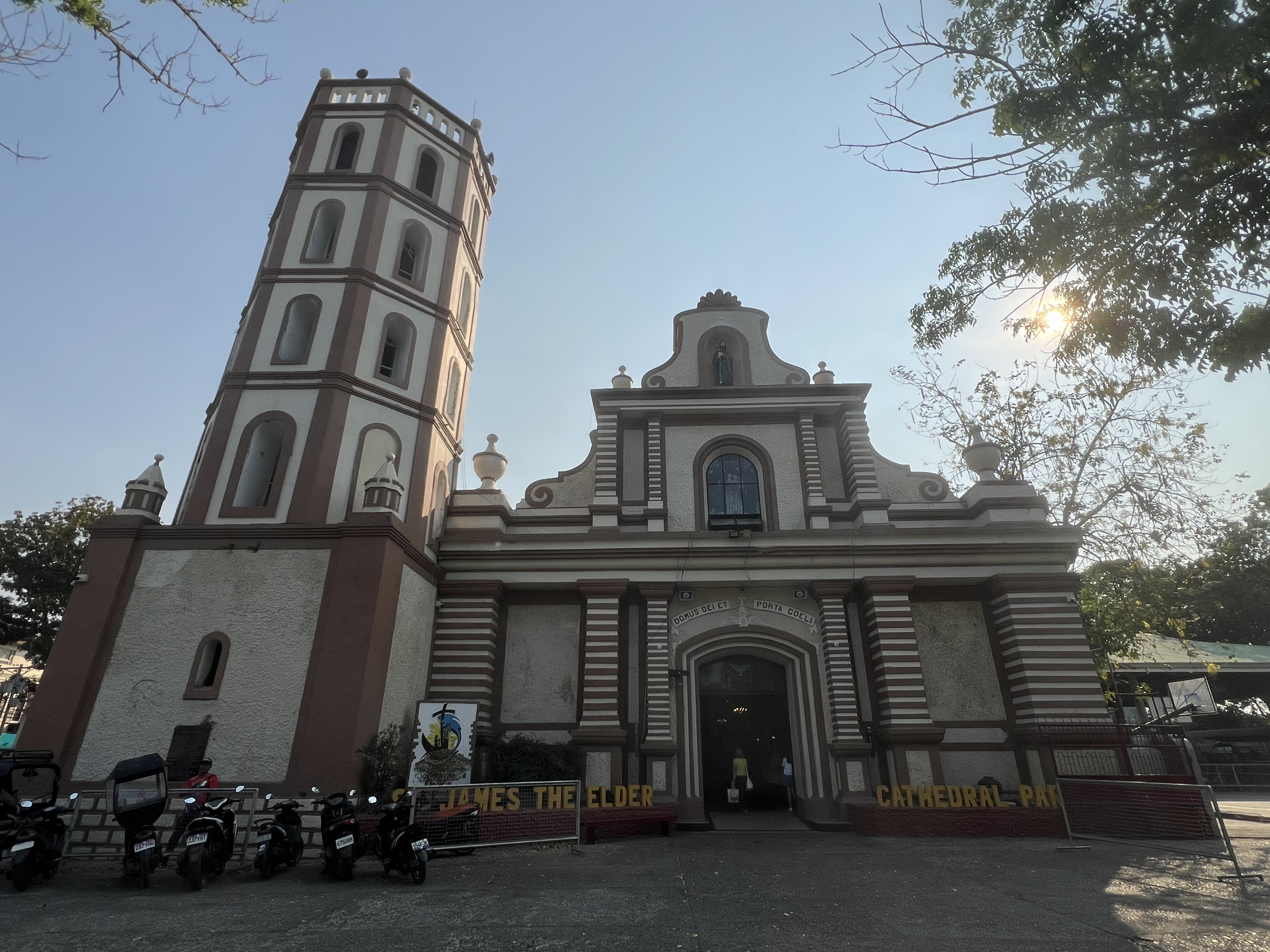
Saint James the Elder (Bangued)

== See also ==
- Catholic Church in the Philippines
- List of Catholic dioceses in the Philippines
