= Apostolic Vicariate of San Jose in Mindoro =

Latin Catholic missionary jurisdiction in the Philippines

Apostolic Vicariate of San Jose in Mindoro Vicariatus Apostolicus Sancti Iosephi in Insulis Philippinis Bikaryato Apostoliko ng San Jose sa Mindoro Vicariato Apostolico de San Jose en Mindoro

Catholic
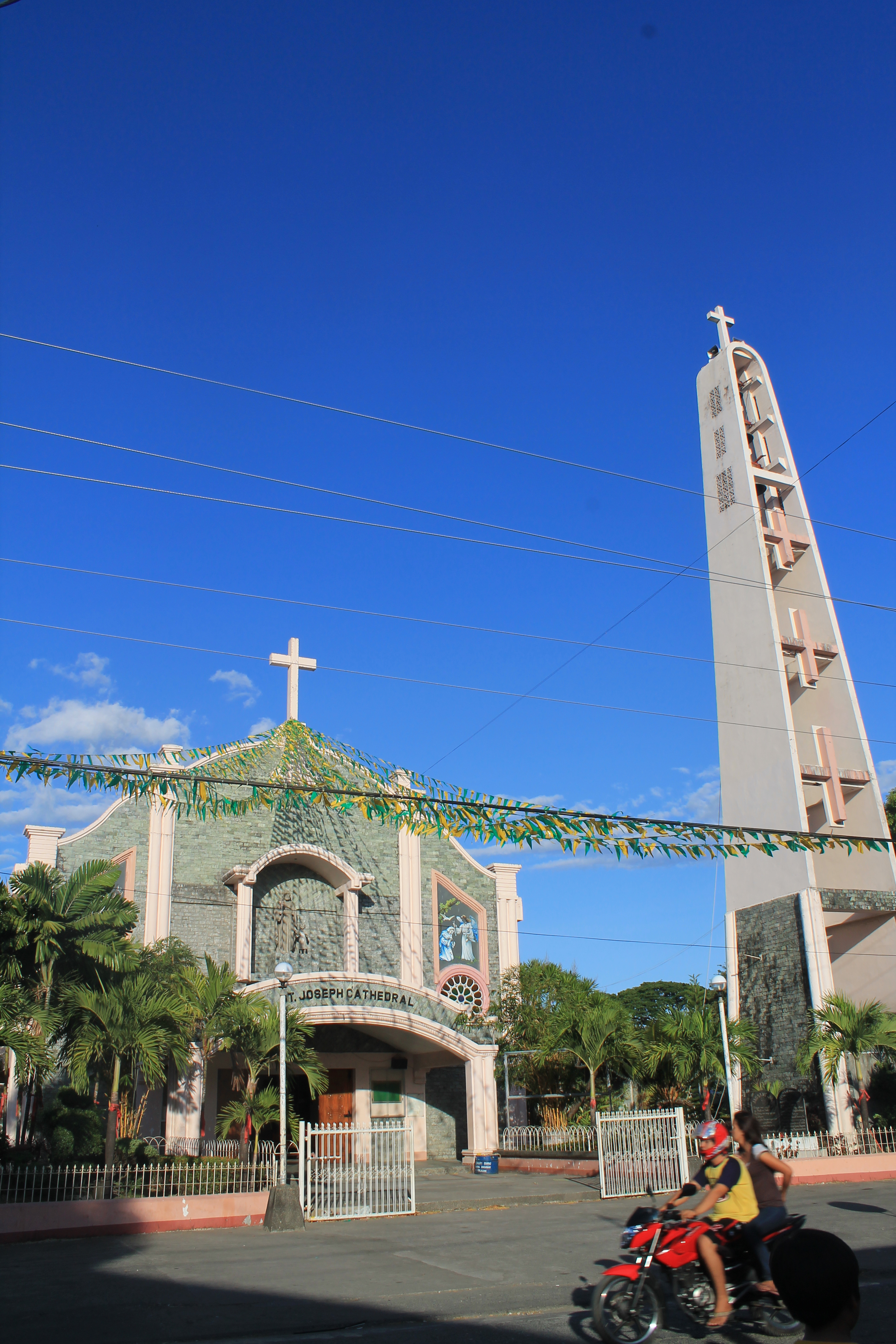
- Cathedral-Parish of St. Joseph the Worker

- Coat of arms

Location
- Country: Philippines
- Territory: Occidental Mindoro
- Ecclesiastical province: Immediately subject to the Holy See
- Deaneries: 4
- Coordinates: 12°21′15″N 121°04′07″E

Statistics
- Population: Total; Catholics: (as of 2021); 532,445; 403,900 (75.9%)
- Parishes: 20, 1 Shrine and 3 Chaplaincies
- Schools: 6

Information
- Denomination: Catholic
- Sui iuris church: Latin Church
- Rite: Roman Rite
- Established: July 1, 1983
- Cathedral: Cathedral-Parish of St. Joseph the Worker
- Patron saint: Joseph the Worker (principal patron); Our Lady of Fatima (secondary patroness)
- Secular priests: 28

Current leadership
- Pope: Leo XIV
- Vicar Apostolic: Pablito Martinez Tagura
- Vicar General: Thaddeus Teaño, SVD

The Apostolic Vicariate of San Jose in Mindoro is a Latin Catholic missionary jurisdiction or apostolic vicariate of the Catholic Church in the western part of Mindoro island in the Philippines. Its cathedra is within the Cathedral-Parish of St. Joseph the Worker, in the episcopal see of San Jose.

== History ==
The Apostolic Vicariate of San Jose, Occidental Mindoro was created on January 27, 1983, by Pope John Paul II, who appointed Vicente C. Manuel as the first apostolic vicar. Manuel was ordained a bishop on June 29, 1983, in the same year the St. Joseph the Worker Parish was elevated to a cathedral. The second vicar apostolic, Antonio P. Palang, was ordained as bishop on May 31, 2002, at St. Joseph the Worker Cathedral, and was consecrated by Cardinal Gaudencio B. Rosales, Archbishop-Emeritus of Manila and Archbishop-Emeritus of Lipa. He resigned on March 17, 2018, due to his health condition, and died on April 21, 2021. On July 1, 2008, The Apostolic Vicariate of San Jose celebrated its Silver Jubilee (25th) anniversary held at St. Joseph the Worker Cathedral, at which the marker of the cathedral was unveiled and the Eucharistic celebration was blessed by Edward Joseph V. Adams, the Apsotolic Nuncio to the Philippines, together with Antonio P. Palang, Apostolic Vicar of San Jose, and the San Jose clergy. On November 21, 2015 Pope Francis appointed David William V. Antonio (then Auxiliary Bishop of Nueva Segovia) as apostolic administrator of the vicariate. The third apostolic vicar, Pablito M. Tagura, was ordained as bishop at the diocesan shrine of Jesus the Divine Word, Christ the King Mission Seminary in Quezon City and was consecrated by Cardinal Luis Antonio G. Tagle, Prefect of the Discastery for the Evangelization of Peoples, Co-consecrated with Charles John C. Brown, Apsotolic Nuncio to the Philippines and Gilbert A. Garcera, Metropolitan Archbishop of Lipa on February 17, 2023. Newly ordained Bishop Tagura was installed on February 25, 2023, at St. Joseph the Worker Cathedral, which was presided by Charles John C. Brown, the Apostolic Nuncio to the Philippines, together with the bishops in the Philippines, Society of the Divine Word and the San Jose clergy. On July 1, 2023, the Apostolic Vicariate of San Jose celebrated its 40th anniversary with a Thanksgiving Mass was presided by Gilbert A. Garcera, Metropolitan Archbishop of Lipa. The anniversary was also celebrated by Pablito M. Tagura, Apostolic Vicar of San Jose, together with the Lipa and San Jose clergy and the enthronement of the Synodal Mission Cross and Our Lady of Caysasay on July 1, 2023, at St. Joseph the Worker Cathedral. The Roman Catholic Apostolic Vicariate of San Jose in Mindoro comprises the civil province of Occidental Mindoro and its 11 municipalities. Its titular patron is Saint Joseph the Worker whose feast is celebrated May 1 in the municipality of San Jose, Occidental Mindoro and the vicariate; Our Lady of Fatima, is its secondary patroness, whose feast is celebrated May 13. Today the Apostolic Vicariate of San Jose, in Occidental Mindoro it is a suffragan of the Archdiocese of Lipa along with the suffragans of Lipa: Boac, Gumaca, Lucena, Infanta, and Calapan.

== Ordinaries ==
Bishop		Period in Office	Notes	Coat of Arms
1.	Vicente Credo Manuel	June 29, 1983 – October 14, 2000 (17 years, 107 days)	Resigned from office	
2.	Antonio Pepito Palang	May 31, 2002 - March 17, 2018 (15 years, 290 days)	Resigned from office	
3.	Pablito Martinez Tagura	February 25, 2023 – present (3 years, 169 days)	Incumbent bishop	
