= Bantay Church =

Roman Catholic church in Ilocos Sur, Philippines

- Saint Augustine of Hippo Parish Church; Archdiocesan Shrine of Our Lady of Charity
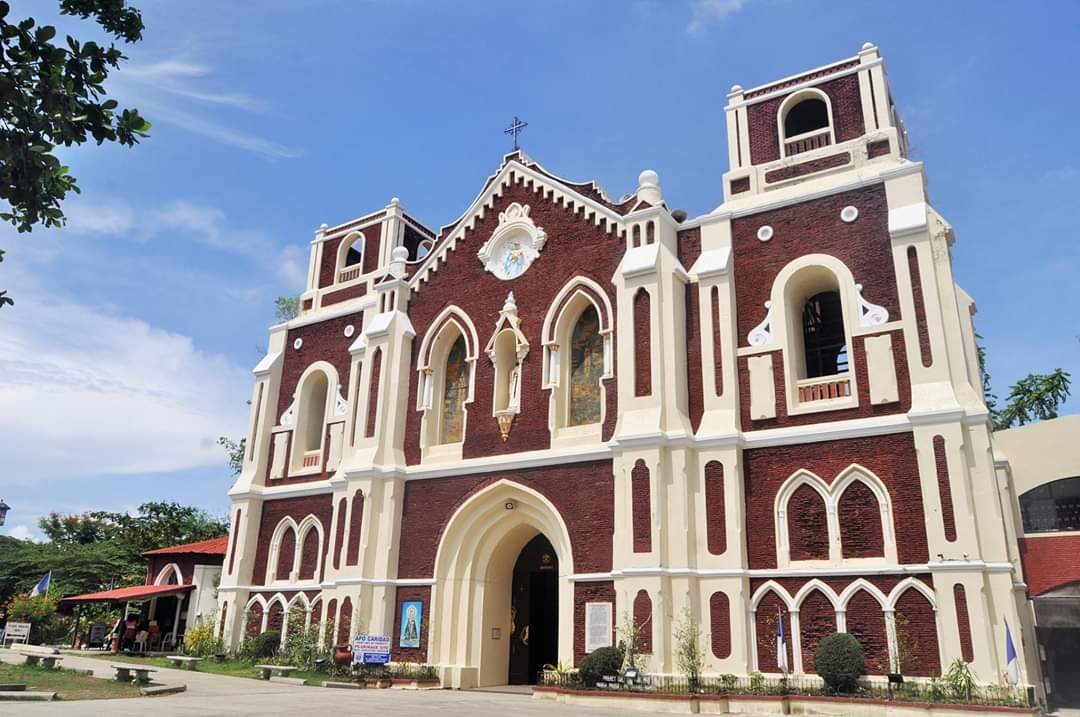
- Church facade in 2016

- Location in Luzon Location in the Philippines
- 17°34′52.3″N 120°23′30″E
- Location: Bantay, Ilocos Sur
- Country: Philippines
- Denomination: Roman Catholic

History
- Status: Parish church
- Dedication: Saint Augustine of Hippo

Architecture
- Functional status: Active
- Architectural type: Church building
- Style: Neo-Gothic and pseudo-Romanesque
- Completed: 1590

Administration
- Archdiocese: Nueva Segovia

Clergy
- Archbishop: David William Antonio

The Parish of Saint Augustine of Hippo, also known as the Archdiocesan Shrine of Our Lady of Charity and colloquially known as Bantay Church, is a Roman Catholic church in Bantay, Ilocos Sur in the Philippines. Dedicated to Saint Augustine of Hippo, the church is under the jurisdiction of the Archdiocese of Nueva Segovia. It houses enshrined an image of the Blessed Virgin Mary venerated under the title of Our Lady of Charity.

Pope Pius XII issued a pontifical decree of coronation titled Quas Tuas Optime on 3 August 1955, towards the venerated image of Our Lady of Charity, being granted to the Archbishop of Nueva Segovia, Santiago Caragnan y Sancho. The decree was signed by the Secretary Deacon Giulio Rossi and notarized by the Grand Chancellor, Girolamo Ricci. The rite of coronation was executed on 12 January 1956 by the Apostolic Nuncio to the country, Cardinal Egidio Vagnozzi and named as "Patroness of Ilocandia".

The old historic bell tower of the church known as the Bantay Tower, which served as a watchtower for pirates during the Spanish colonial era, gave the town its name – bantay (meaning "to guard"). Another interpretation claims the word as “Mountain” held to be a sacred place by its Marian devotees.

== Architecture ==
The church was heavily damaged during World War II, and its reconstruction started in 1950. The restored façade is of Neo-Gothic design mixed with pseudo-Romanesque materials and elements. It is designed to be grandiose and reminiscent of Spanish architecture. It uses materials such as bricks and mud.

The belfry sits on a hilltop overlooking a green pasture and the province of Abra. It was used as a watchtower for invading enemy forces during World War II because of its strategic location. The Bantay Church and bell tower are monumental witnesses to various atrocities and uprisings. Five bells are found in the uppermost level of the tower.

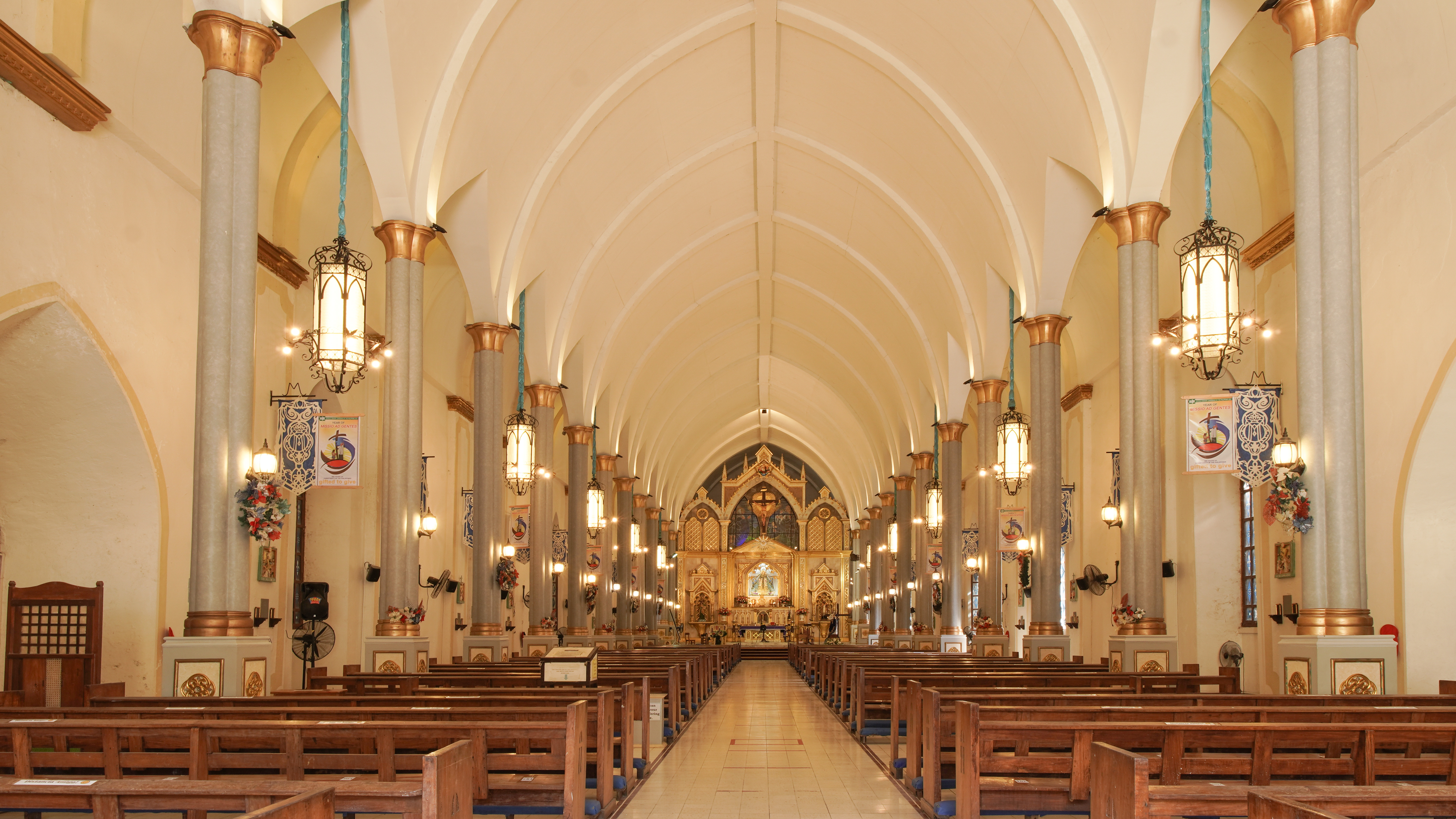
Church nave in 2021

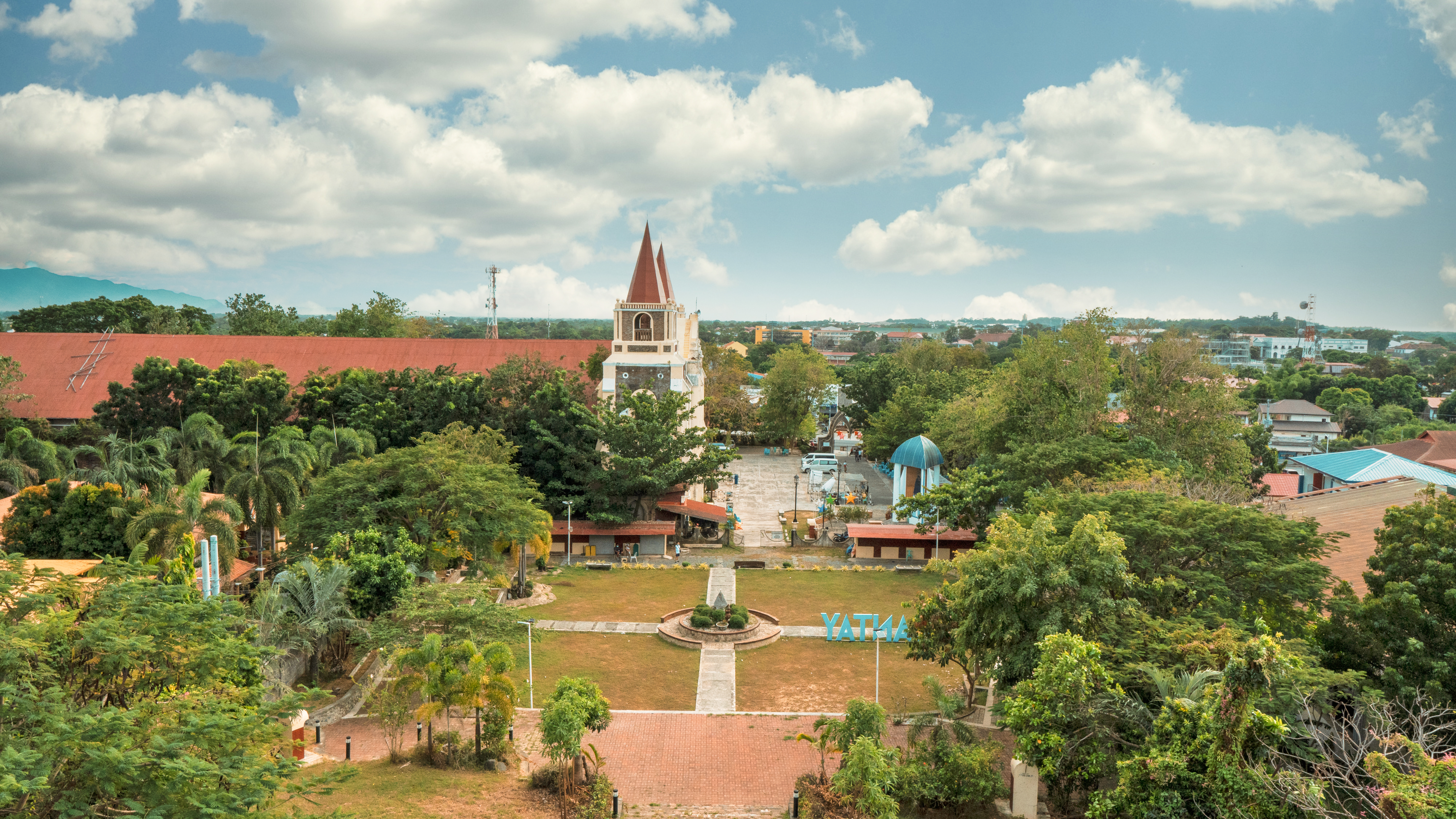
Aerial side view of the church

Parish office

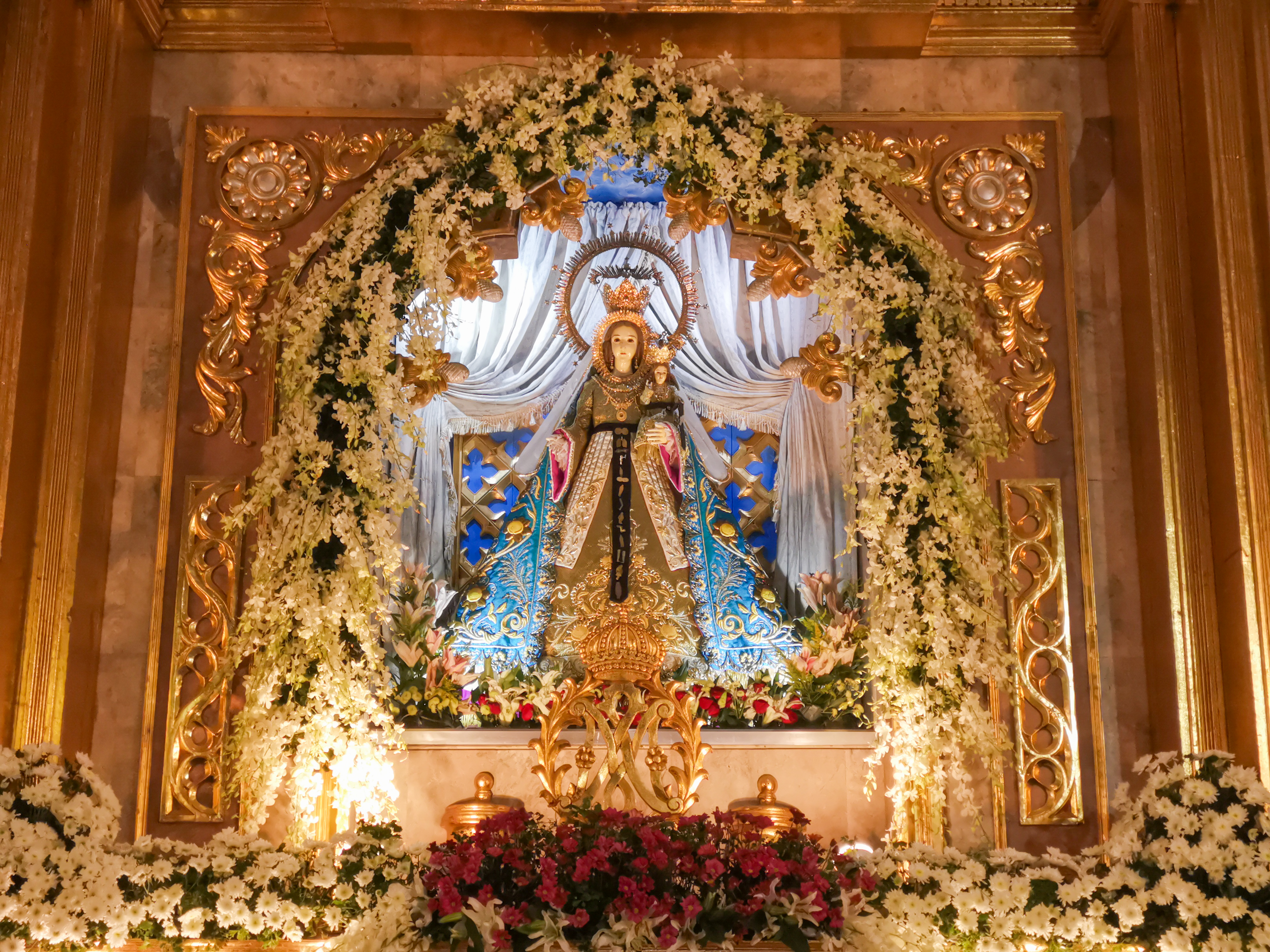
The canonically crowned image of Apo Caridad

Bell tower, a declared National Cultural Treasure, pre-2022 earthquake

Ruined walls outside the church, repurposed into an outdoor chapel

== 2022 earthquake ==
On July 27, 2022, parts of the Bantay Bell Tower crumbled after a 7.0 magnitude earthquake struck the province of Abra and nearby provinces.
