= Tayum =

Municipality in Abra, Philippines

- Municipality
- Municipality of Tayum
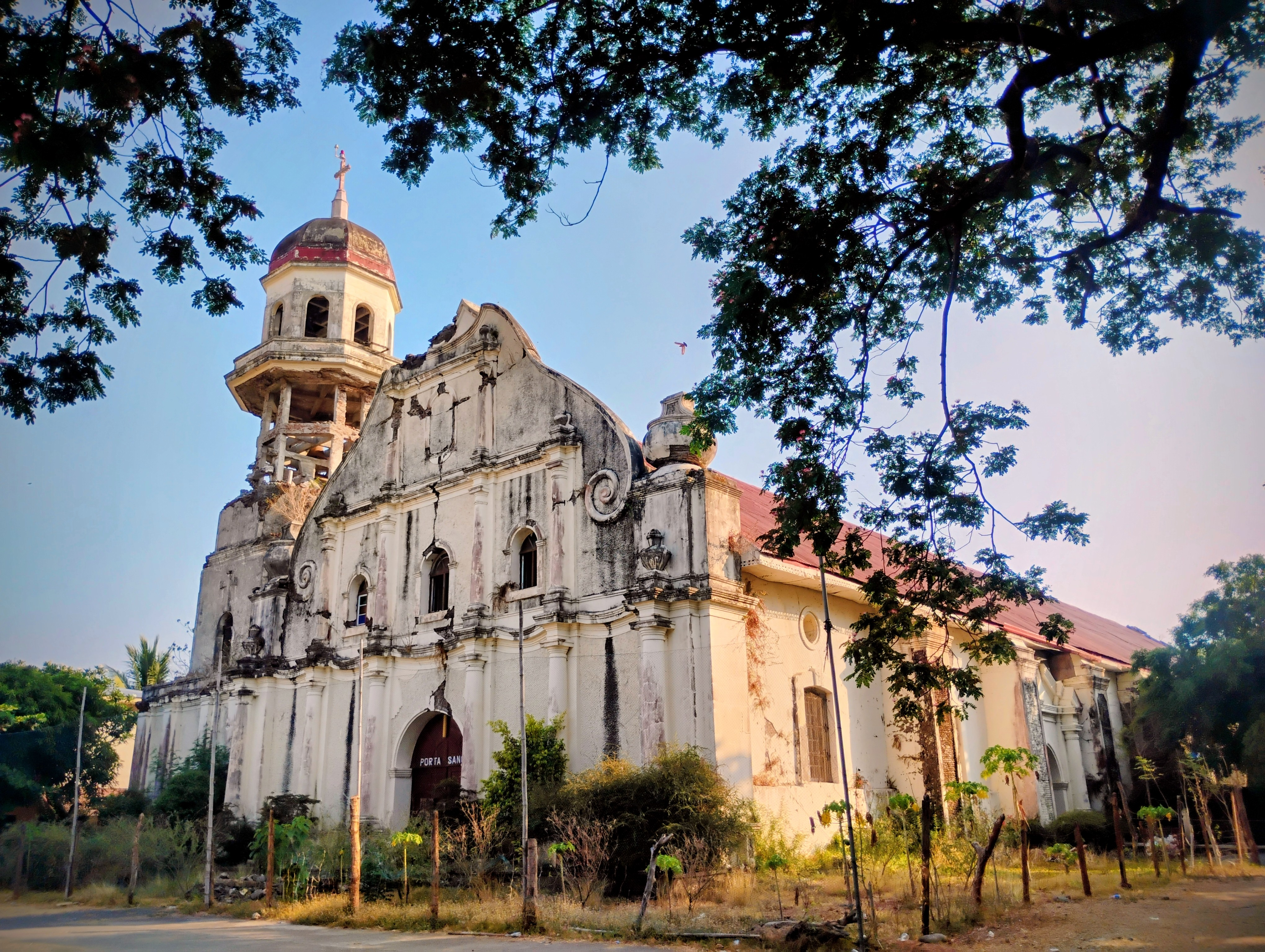
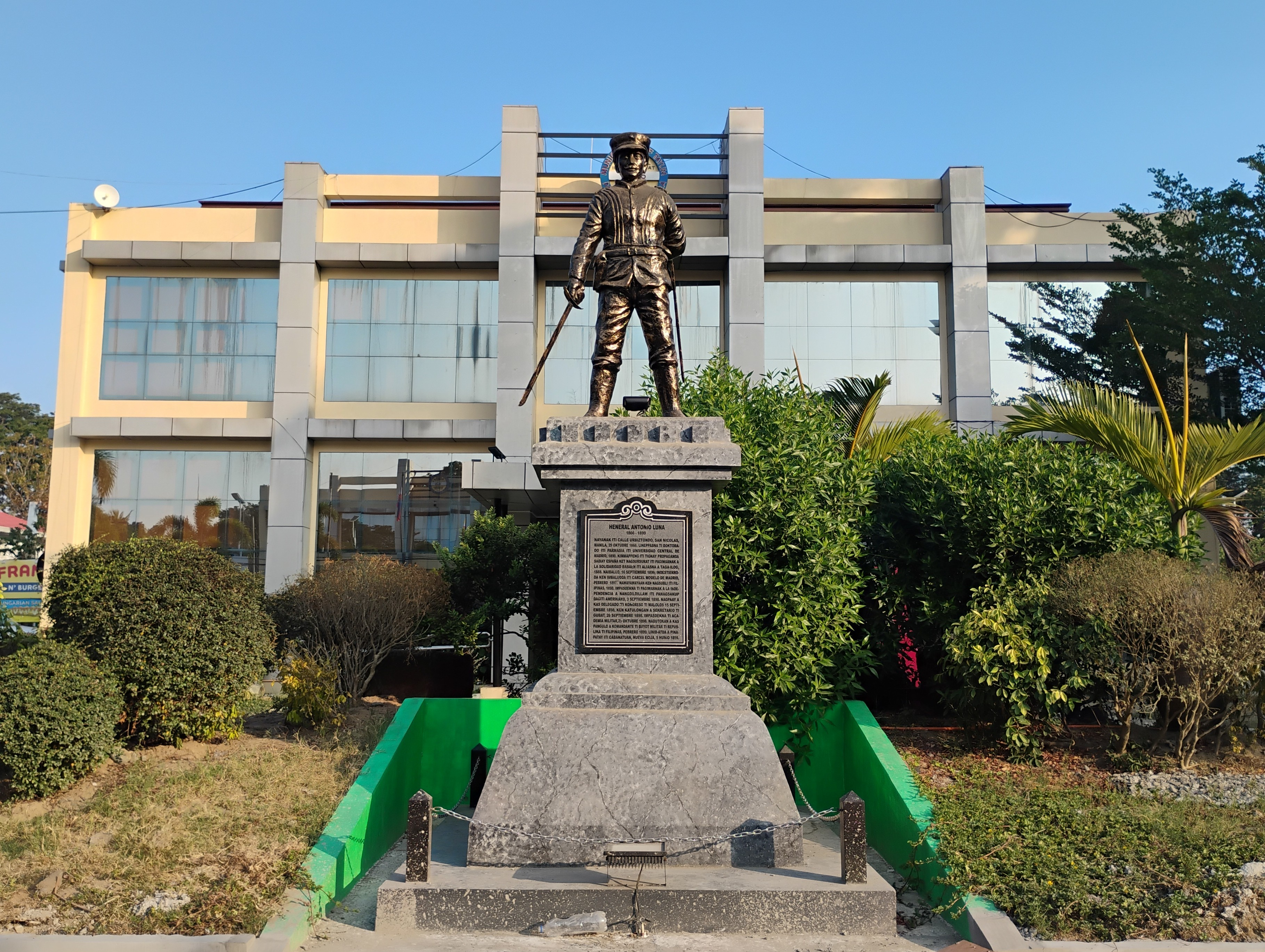
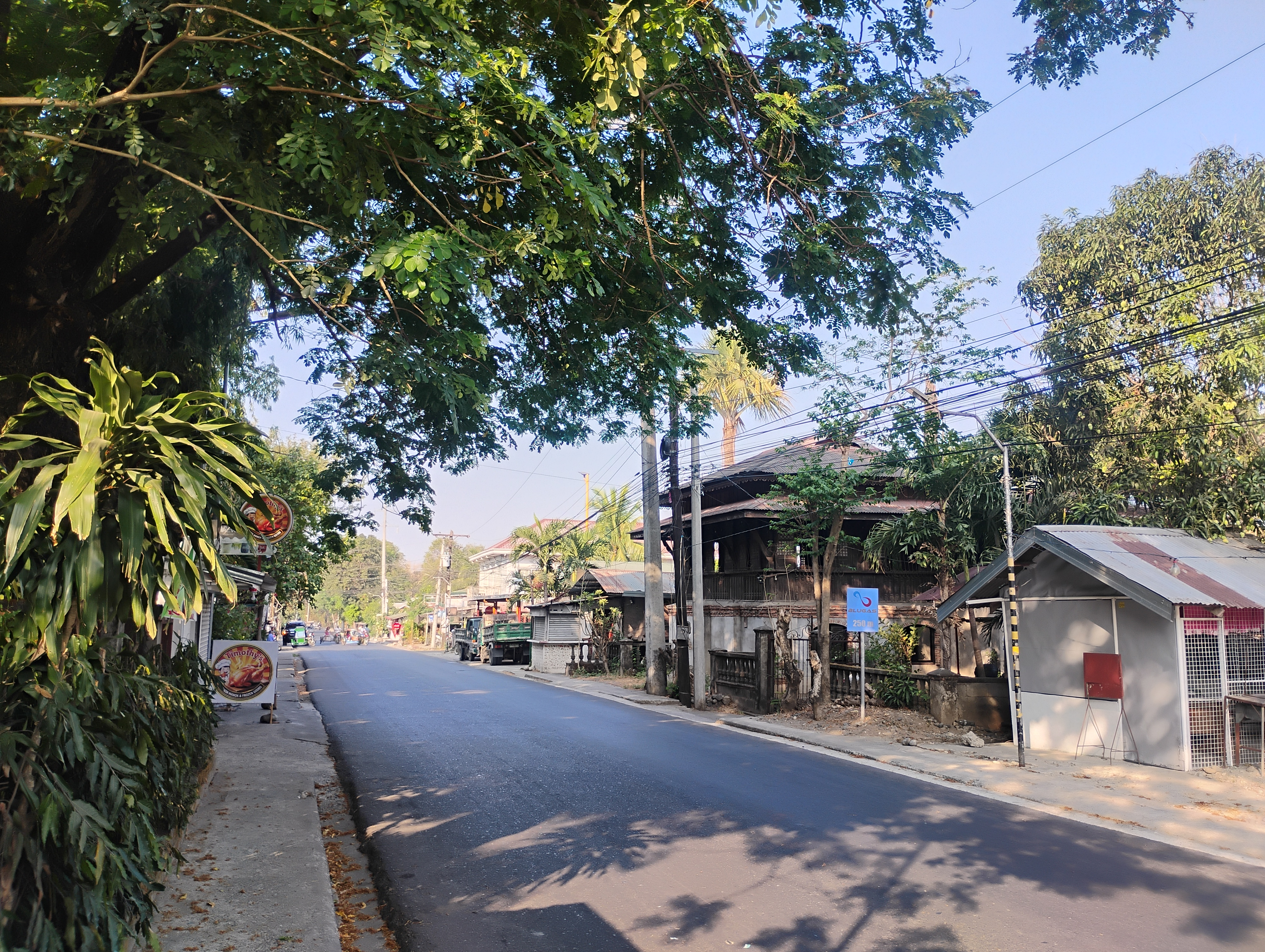
- Tayum Church Tayum Municipal Hall Abra-Kalinga Road along Tayum

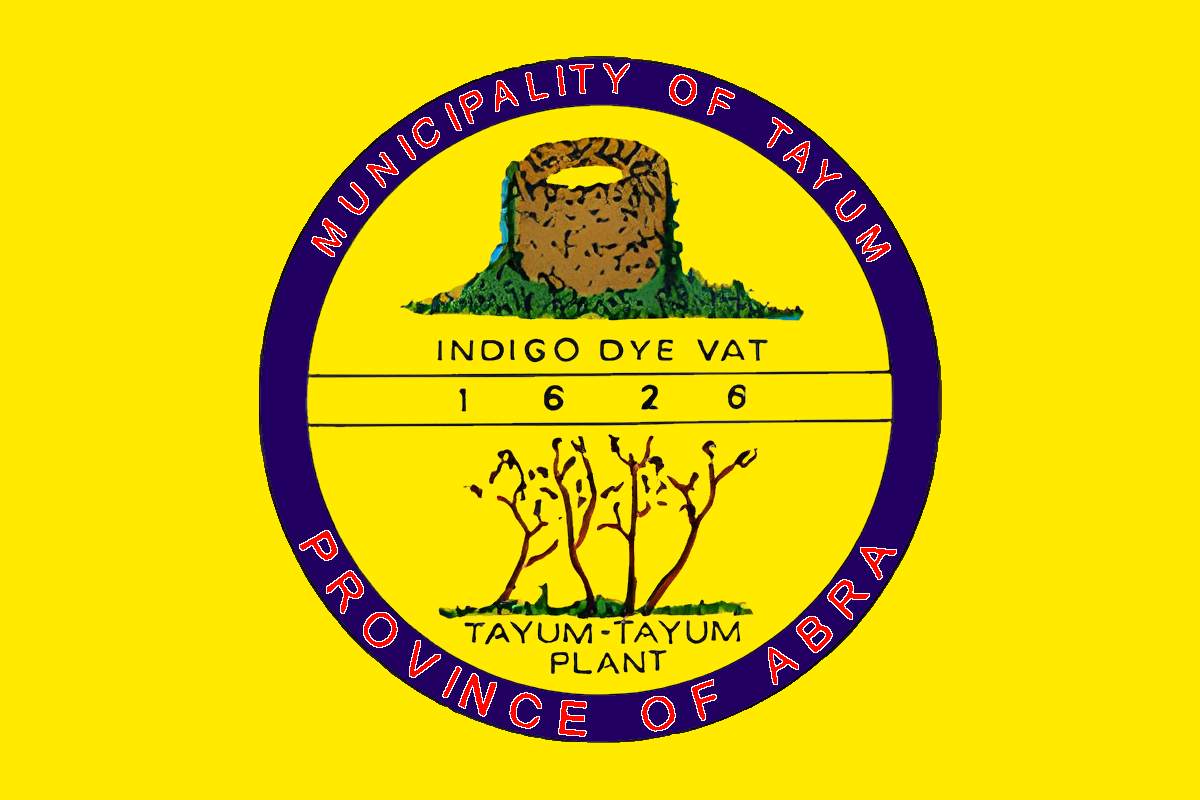
- Flag

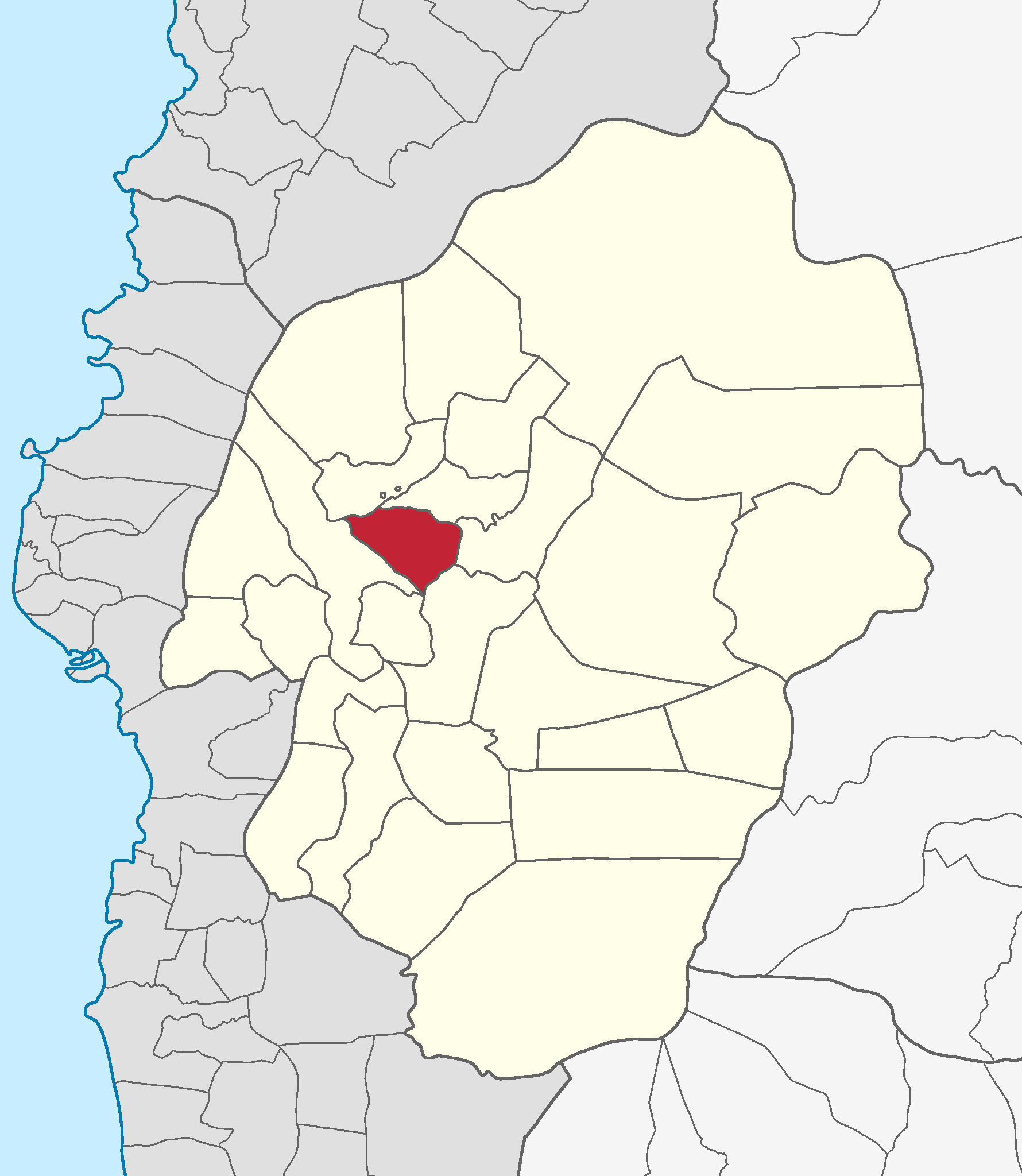
- Map of Abra with Tayum highlighted
- Interactive map of Tayum
- Location within the Philippines
- Coordinates: 17°37′N 120°40′E
- Country: Philippines
- Region: Cordillera Administrative Region
- Province: Abra
- District: Lone district
- Barangays: 11 (see Barangays)

Government
  - Type: Sangguniang Bayan
  - Mayor: Placido P. Eduarte Jr.
  - Vice Mayor: Emmanuel Eleazar B. Eduarte
  - Representative: Joseph Santo Niño B. Bernos
  - Municipal Council: Members: Crisostomo T. Tacanay; Romulo A. Elveña; Avelino T. Tejero; Manuel T. Azarcon; Jimmy D. Evaristo; Joel P. Flores; Walter T. Tugadi; Rafael T. Cariño
  - Electorate: 10,468 voters (2025)

Area
  - Total: 61.14 km^{2} (23.61 sq mi)
- Elevation: 70 m (230 ft)
- Highest elevation: 283 m (928 ft)
- Lowest elevation: 31 m (102 ft)

Population (2024 census)
  - Total: 14,808
  - Density: 242.2/km^{2} (627.3/sq mi)
  - Households: 3,507

Economy
  - Income class: 1st municipal income class
  - Poverty incidence: 8.03% (2023)
  - Revenue: ₱ 259.8 million (2024)
  - Assets: ₱ 859.2 million (2024)
  - Expenditure: ₱ 211.2 million (2024)
  - Liabilities: ₱ 66.62 million (2024)

Service provider
  - Electricity: Abra Electric Cooperative (ABRECO)
- Time zone: UTC+8 (PST)
- ZIP code: 2803
- PSGC: 1400124000
- IDD : area code: +63 (0)74
- Native languages: Itneg; Ilocano; Tagalog

Tayum, officially the Municipality of Tayum (Ilocano: Ili ti Tayum; Tagalog: Bayan ng Tayum), is a municipality in the province of Abra, Philippines. According to the 2024 census, it has a population of 14,808 people.

Every 25 November, Tayum celebrates its town fiesta. Roman Catholicism is the dominant religion.

== Etymology ==
According to historical records, Tayum was named after the indigo plant, which the Ilocanos referred to as tayum-tayum. Indigo once flourished in Tayum, and it was a source of wealth for the Ilocanos. A big vat (pagtimbugan) was used in decaying the plant into a blue-black dye called "ngila" in Barangay Deet, about a half-kilometer away from the town proper. Cotton yams were dyed using the dye.

However, at the turn of the century, a powder dye from the Anilino Factories of Germany became popular among Ilocano weavers, effectively killing the indigo industry.

== History ==
=== Spanish colonial era ===
Tayum, also known as Bukaw, was founded in 1626 by an enterprising priest named Father Juan Pareja. Father Gabriel Alvarez, another equally daring and adventurous Augustinian Priest, built a temporary chapel in Tayum during his expedition to Lepanto in 1569. Tayum was formally organized as a political unit under the Spanish Regime in 1725. Don Vidal Banganan served as the first Gobernadorcillo.

With the construction of the solid bricks walled church under the successive Augustinian missions, Tayum transformed from a mere visita of Bangued into an independent mission in the year 1807. The church was built in honor of St. Catherine of Alexandria, whose feast day falls on November 25.

=== American invasion era ===
In 1904, Tayum reverted to a barrio of Bangued, due to the deterioration of peace and order at the time. Tayum's existence as a barrio came to an end on December 31, 1907, when Don Pio Balmaceda y Belmonte was appointed Teniente del barrio. Balmaceda organized his men to effectively curb lawlessness, restoring peace to the town. It regained its town status, with Don Manuel Brillantes as its first president.

=== World War II ===
At about 3:00 am, in the early dawn of Sunday, 8 October 1944, 500 bolo men from the resistance entered Tayum and set several homes including the Tayum Municipal Building on fire. Torches were applied to all the houses on Santa Clara Street's southern side. They left the town at 5:45 am, leaving behind 24 houses and 1 granary in flames, as well as killing Mayor Severo Brillantes, two mayors, two ex-soldiers, two leaders of the neighborhood association Ho-Ko and four other law abiding citizens.

=== Contemporary era ===
On July 27, 2022, a magnitude 7.0 earthquake struck 3 km from the town. The quake killed at least eleven people and injured 567 others (19 of them in Tayum).

== Geography ==
According to the Philippine Statistics Authority, the municipality has a land area of 61.14 square kilometres (23.61 sq mi) constituting 1.47% of the 4,165.25-square-kilometre- (1,608.21 sq mi) total area of Abra. The town is located at 17°37′N 120°40′E.

Tayum is situated 5.54 kilometres (3.44 mi) from the provincial capital Bangued, and 411.39 kilometres (255.63 mi) from the country's capital city of Manila.

=== Barangays ===
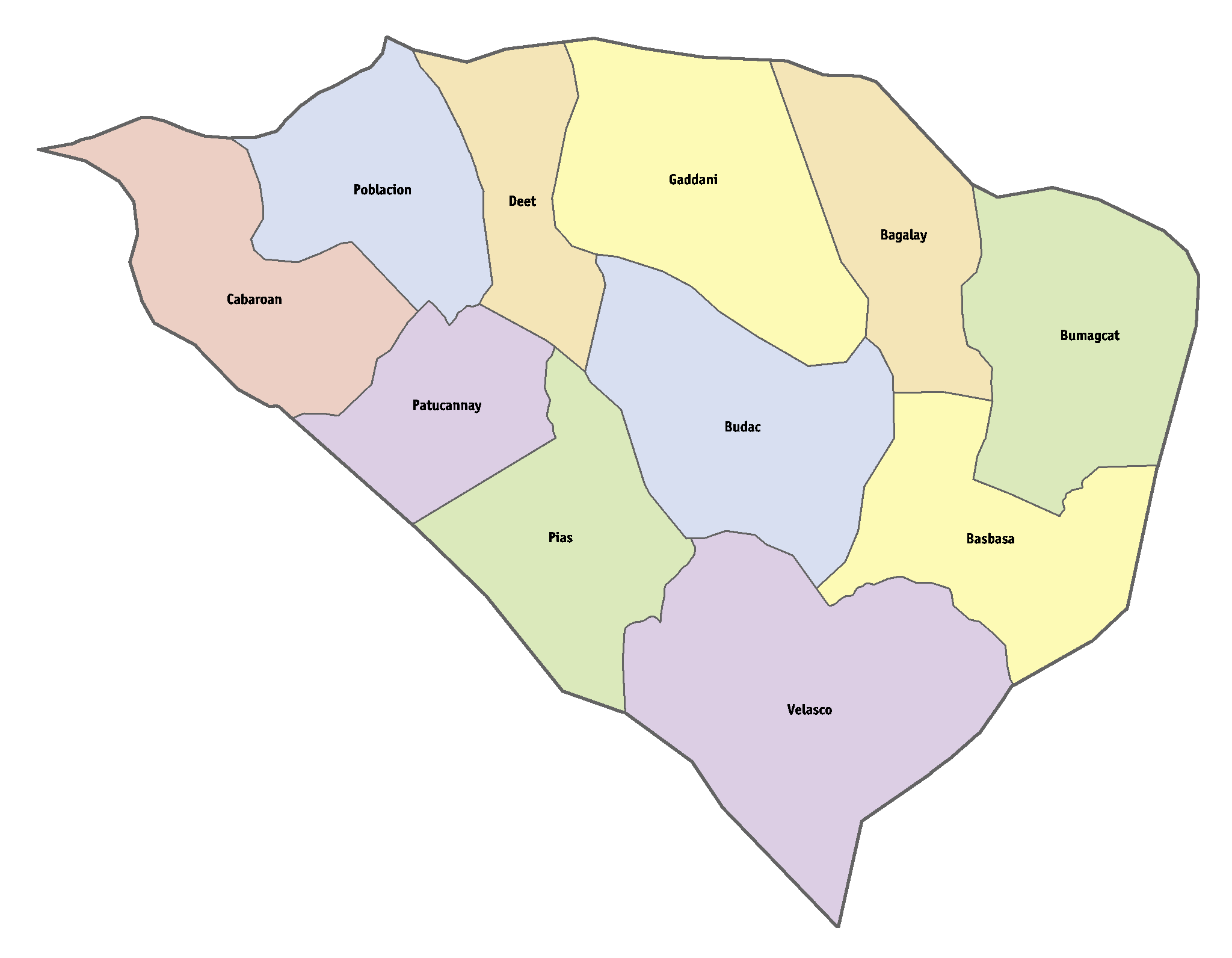
Political map of Tayum

Tayum is politically subdivided into 11 barangays. Each barangay consists of puroks and some have sitios.

PSGC	Barangay	Population			±% p.a.	
		2024		2010		
140124001	Bagalay	6.9%	1,026	937	▴	0.63%
140124002	Basbasa	5.8%	852	849	▴	0.02%
140124003	Budac	9.4%	1,387	1,286	▴	0.53%
140124004	Bumagcat	5.6%	830	794	▴	0.31%
140124005	Cabaroan	9.2%	1,365	1,251	▴	0.61%
140124006	Deet	6.6%	973	912	▴	0.45%
140124007	Gaddani	10.6%	1,573	1,325	▴	1.20%
140124008	Patucannay	9.8%	1,445	1,317	▴	0.65%
140124009	Pias	7.9%	1,169	1,165	▴	0.02%
140124010	Poblacion	18.1%	2,676	2,645	▴	0.08%
140124011	Velasco	10.6%	1,573	1,459	▴	0.52%
	Total		14,808	14,869	▾	−0.03%

=== Climate ===
Climate data for Tayum, Abra
Month	Jan	Feb	Mar	Apr	May	Jun	Jul	Aug	Sep	Oct	Nov	Dec	Year
Mean daily maximum °C (°F)	29 (84)	31 (88)	32 (90)	34 (93)	32 (90)	31 (88)	30 (86)	30 (86)	30 (86)	30 (86)	30 (86)	29 (84)	31 (87)
Mean daily minimum °C (°F)	18 (64)	19 (66)	20 (68)	23 (73)	24 (75)	24 (75)	24 (75)	24 (75)	23 (73)	22 (72)	21 (70)	19 (66)	22 (71)
Average precipitation mm (inches)	9 (0.4)	11 (0.4)	13 (0.5)	23 (0.9)	92 (3.6)	122 (4.8)	153 (6.0)	137 (5.4)	139 (5.5)	141 (5.6)	42 (1.7)	14 (0.6)	896 (35.4)
Average rainy days	4.6	4.0	6.2	9.1	19.5	23.2	24.0	22.5	21.5	15.2	10.5	6.0	166.3
Source: Meteoblue

== Demographics ==
Population census of Tayum
Year	Pop.	±% p.a.
1903	4,366	—
1918	5,832	+1.95%
1939	6,054	+0.18%
1948	6,281	+0.41%
1960	7,025	+0.94%
1970	8,211	+1.57%
1975	9,126	+2.14%
1980	9,621	+1.06%
1990	11,045	+1.39%
1995	12,346	+2.11%
2000	12,539	+0.33%
2007	13,360	+0.88%
2010	13,940	+1.56%
2015	14,467	+0.71%
2020	14,869	+0.58%
2024	14,808	−0.10%
Source: Philippine Statistics Authority

In the 2024 census, Tayum had a population of 14,808 people. The population density was 240 inhabitants per square kilometre (620/sq mi).

== Economy ==
Poverty incidence of Tayum (%)

Source: Philippine Statistics Authority

The main source of economy in Tayum is agriculture. The agricultural aspect of Tayum relies on rice and corn production and contract-growing initiatives like the tobacco system. The Tayum farmers are also practicing animal-raising programs to supply agricultural income streams.

== Government ==
=== Local government ===
Tayum, belonging to the lone congressional district of the province of Abra, is governed by a mayor designated as its local chief executive and by a municipal council as its legislative body in accordance with the Local Government Code. The mayor, vice mayor, and the councilors are elected directly by the people through an election which is being held every three years.

=== Elected officials ===
Members of the Municipal Council (2025–2028)
Position	Name
Congressman	Joseph Santo Niño B. Bernos
Mayor	Placido P. Eduarte Jr.
Vice-Mayor	Emmanuel Eleazar B. Eduarte
Councilors	Rafael T. Cariño
Councilors	Crisostomo T. Tacanay
Councilors	Romulo A. Elveña
Councilors	Avelino T. Tejero
Councilors	Joel P. Flores
Councilors	Manuel T. Azarcon
Councilors	Jimmy D. Evaristo
Councilors	Walter T. Tugadi

== List of Cultural Properties of Tayum ==
Cultural Property wmph identifier (Note: wmph is an internal identifier used by Wikimedia Philippines to identify the monument. This is not an official identifier, and only shown temporarily in the templates until the government creates an updated complete list.)	Site name	Description	Province	City or municipality	Address	Coordinates	Image
	Saint Catherine of Alexandria Church	A 19th-century Baroque church, declared a National Cultural Treasure by the National Museum of the Philippines in 2001.	Abra	Tayum		17°37′07″N 120°39′16″E	Upload file
	First SVD Regional House	Established by Fr. Luis Beckert in 1912. Fr. Beckert is the first regional superior of the SVD Missionaries in Abra.	Abra	Tayum		17°37′07″N 120°39′16″E	Upload file
	Flores Ancestral House	Built in 1890.	Abra	Tayum	Isidro Flores St.	17°37′04″N 120°39′18″E	Upload file
	Jose Cariño Sr. Ancestral House		Abra	Tayum	1 Brilliantes corner Jose Cariño	17°37′00″N 120°39′17″E	Upload file
	Teodoro Brillantes Ancestral House		Abra	Tayum	Poblacion		Upload file

== Transportation ==
The main mode of public transportation are tricycles and jeepneys.

== Education ==
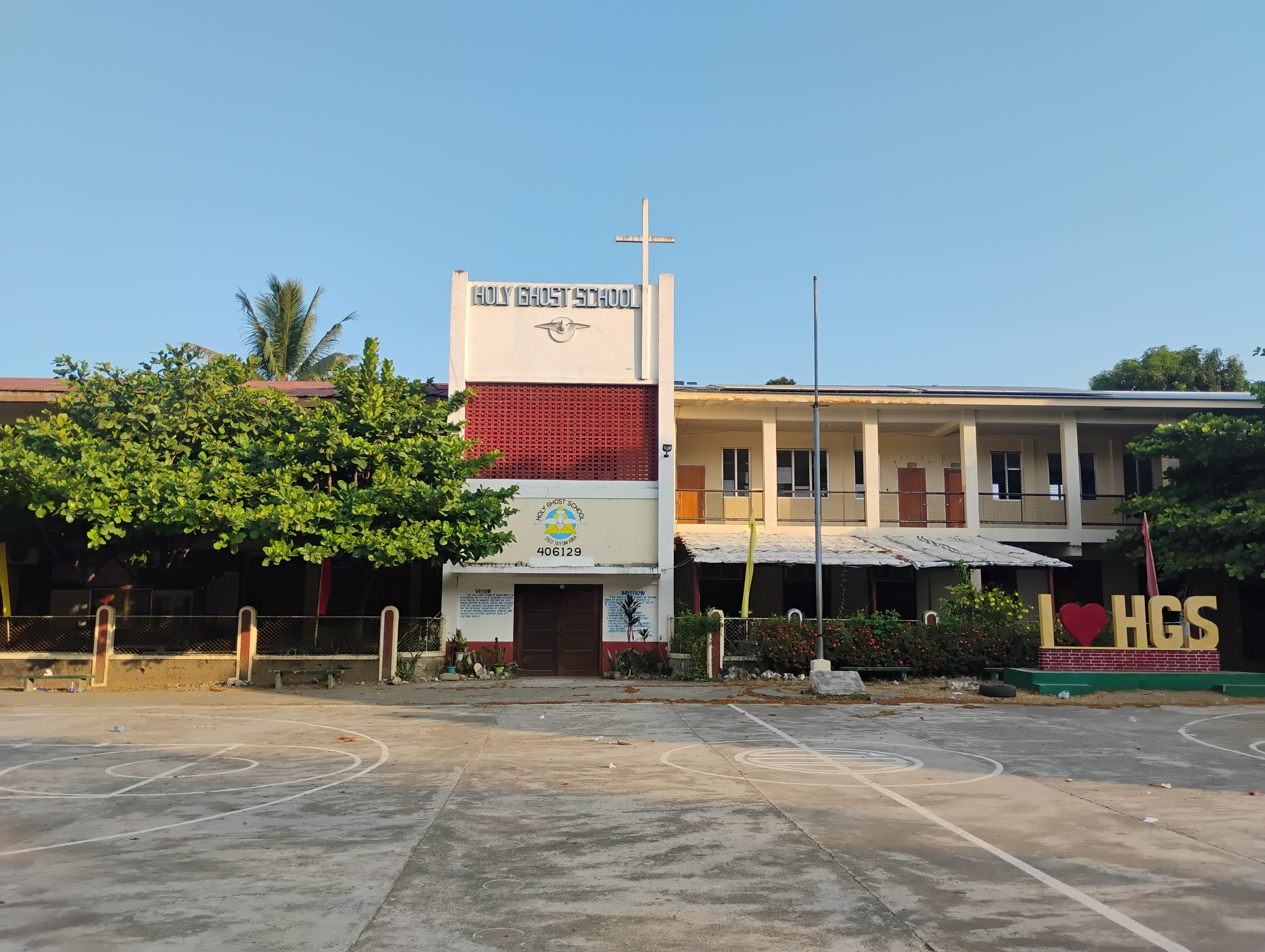
Holy Ghost School

The Tayum Schools District Office governs all educational institutions within the municipality. It oversees the management and operations of all private and public, from primary to secondary schools.

=== Primary and elementary schools ===
- Bagalay Elementary School
- Basbasa Elementary School
- Bumagcat Elementary School
- Don Marcos Rosales Elementary School
- Tayum Central School
- Velasco Elementary School

=== Secondary schools ===
- Ananaao Integrated School
- Gaddani National High School
- Holy Ghost School

== See also ==
- Santa Catalina de Alejandria Parish Church
