= Teodoro Brillantes House =

Historic building in Abra, Philippines

- Bahay Teodoro Brillantes (Filipino)
- The house in 2026
- Interactive map of the Teodoro Brillantes House area

General information
- Location: Tayum, Abra, Philippines
- Coordinates: 17°36′58″N 120°39′14″E

The Teodoro Brillantes Ancestral House (Filipino: Tirahang Ansestral ni Teodoro Brillantes) is a historic residential building in Tayum, Abra, Philippines. Listed as Teodoro Brillantes House (Filipino: Bahay Teodoro Brillantes), the building is considered as a National Historical Landmark by the National Historical Commission of the Philippines.

It hosted a private museum which features artifacts of the Brillantes family, some dating back to the Spanish colonial era in the Philippines.

Currently however, the artifacts are now not displayed inside the historic residential building.
