= Tayum Church =

Roman Catholic church in Abra, Philippines

- Saint Catherine of Alexandria Parish Church
- Iglesia Parroquial de Santa Catalina de Alejandría (Spanish)
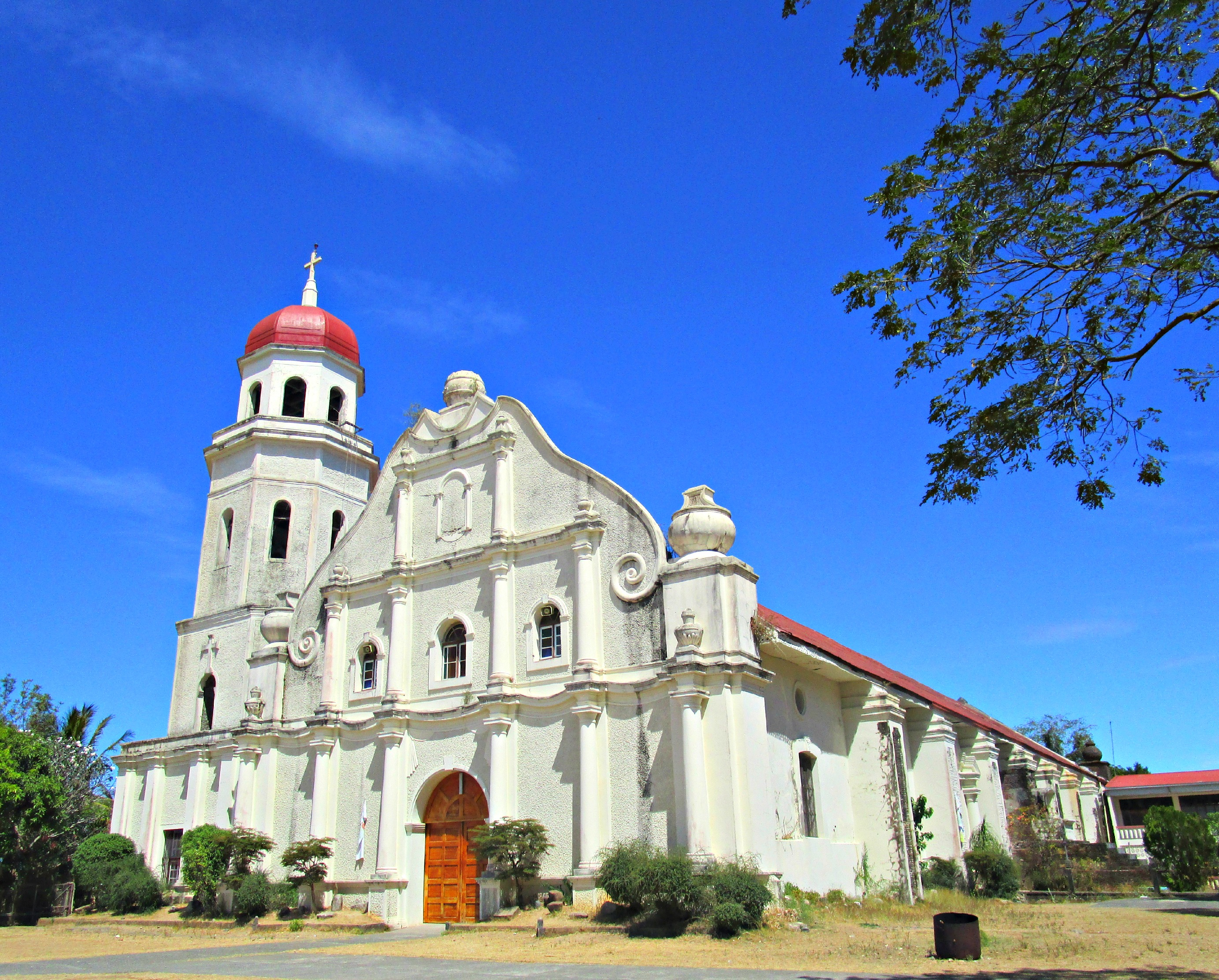
- Church façade prior to the July 2022 earthquake

- Location in Luzon Location in the Philippines
- 17°37′07″N 120°39′15″E
- Location: Brgy. Poblacion, Tayum, Abra
- Country: Philippines
- Denomination: Roman Catholic

History
- Status: Parish church
- Dedication: Saint Catherine of Alexandria

Architecture
- Functional status: Active
- Heritage designation: National Cultural treasure
- Designated: 2001
- Architectural type: Church building
- Style: Baroque
- Completed: 1803
- Demolished: 2022 (partial due to earthquake)

Specifications
- Materials: Brick, Sand, Gravel, Cement, Steel

Administration
- Archdiocese: Nueva Segovia
- Diocese: Bangued

Clergy
- Bishop: Leopoldo Jaucian

Saint Catherine of Alexandria Parish Church, commonly known as Tayum Church, is a 19th-century Baroque Roman Catholic church located at Brgy. Poblacion, Tayum, Abra, Philippines. The parish church, under the patronage of Saint Catherine of Alexandria, is under the jurisdiction of the Diocese of Bangued. The church, together with 25 other Spanish-era churches, was declared a National Cultural Treasure by the National Museum of the Philippines in 2001. Its current parish priest is Fr. Roderick Ardaniel, who succeeded Fr. Ruben Valdez.

== History ==
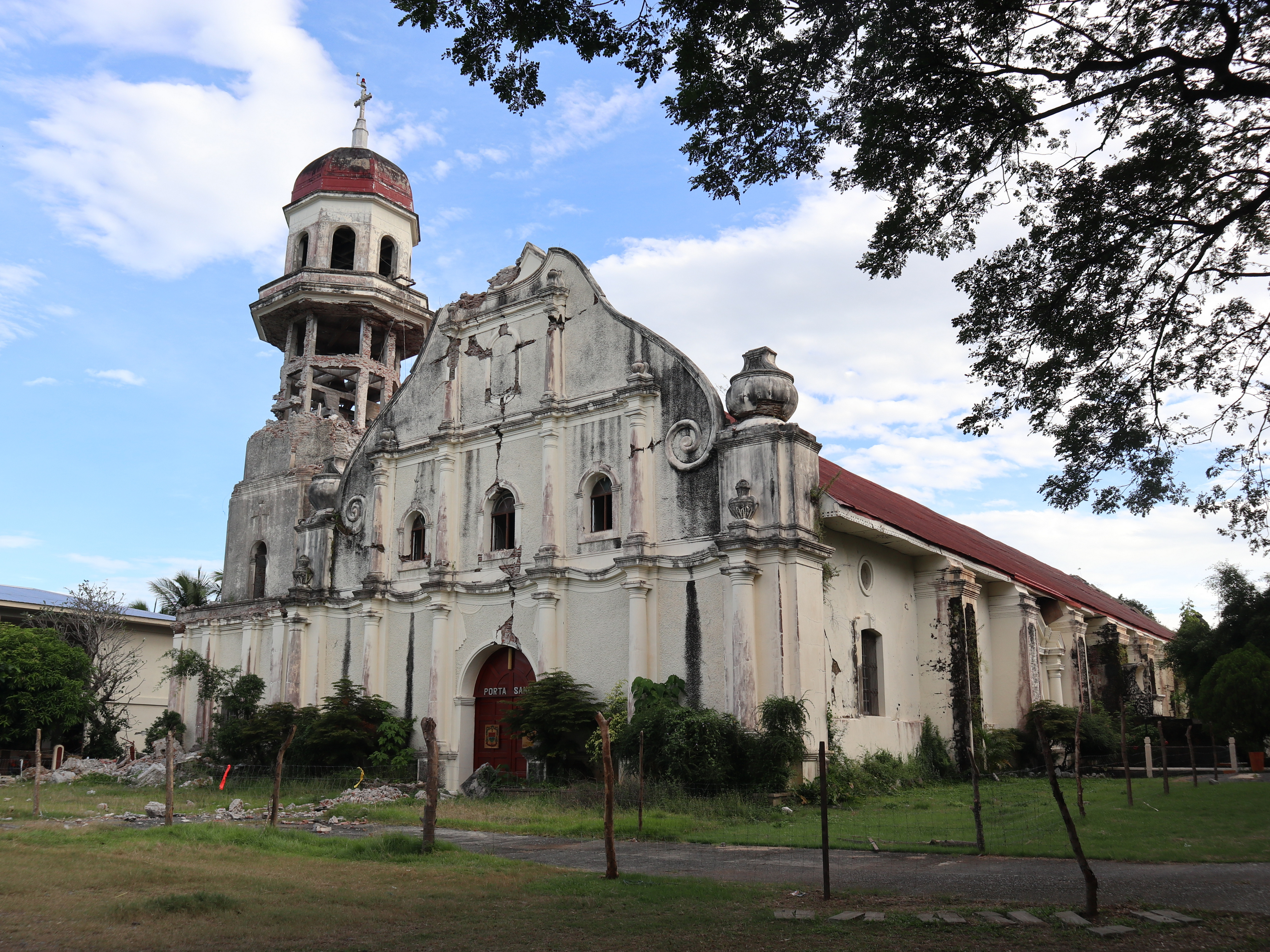
The church in 2022 after the 2022 Luzon earthquake

The church of Tayum, unlike the majority of Spanish-era churches in the country, was founded and built by Secular priests to Christianize the indigenous Tinguians in the region during the 19th century. Other examples of churches erected by the Secular priests in the Philippines during the above-mentioned era are the Manila Cathedral, Quiapo Church and the San Juan de Dios Church.

Tayum became a visita of Bangued when the Augustinian missionary Fr. Juan de Pareja, OSA founded a number of pueblos in 1626. Later that same year, Fr. de Pareja founded Tayum as an independent mission station. Tayum was established as an independent parish in 1803, under the Diocese of Nueva Segovia (Vigan).

=== Restoration ===
Tayum Chapel, where services are currently being held pending renovation of the main church

On July 27, 2022, the church was damaged by the 7.0 magnitude earthquake that hit parts of Luzon. As a National Cultural Treasure, the church is a priority for future restoration and government funding as per law. The parish leadership has asked for donations amid efforts for restoration. The National Historical Commission of the Philippines has stated that they will seek for the restoration of the church. While the National Commission of Culture and the Arts has stated that it will deploy a team to assess the site. However, as of 2026, no physical restoration has yet to be made.

== Patronage ==
The parish of Tayum was placed under the patronage of Saint Catherine of Alexandria, virgin and martyr, whose feast is celebrated on November 25. However, it is not known when and how St. Catherine of Alexandria came to be chosen as the patroness of the parish.

== Architecture ==
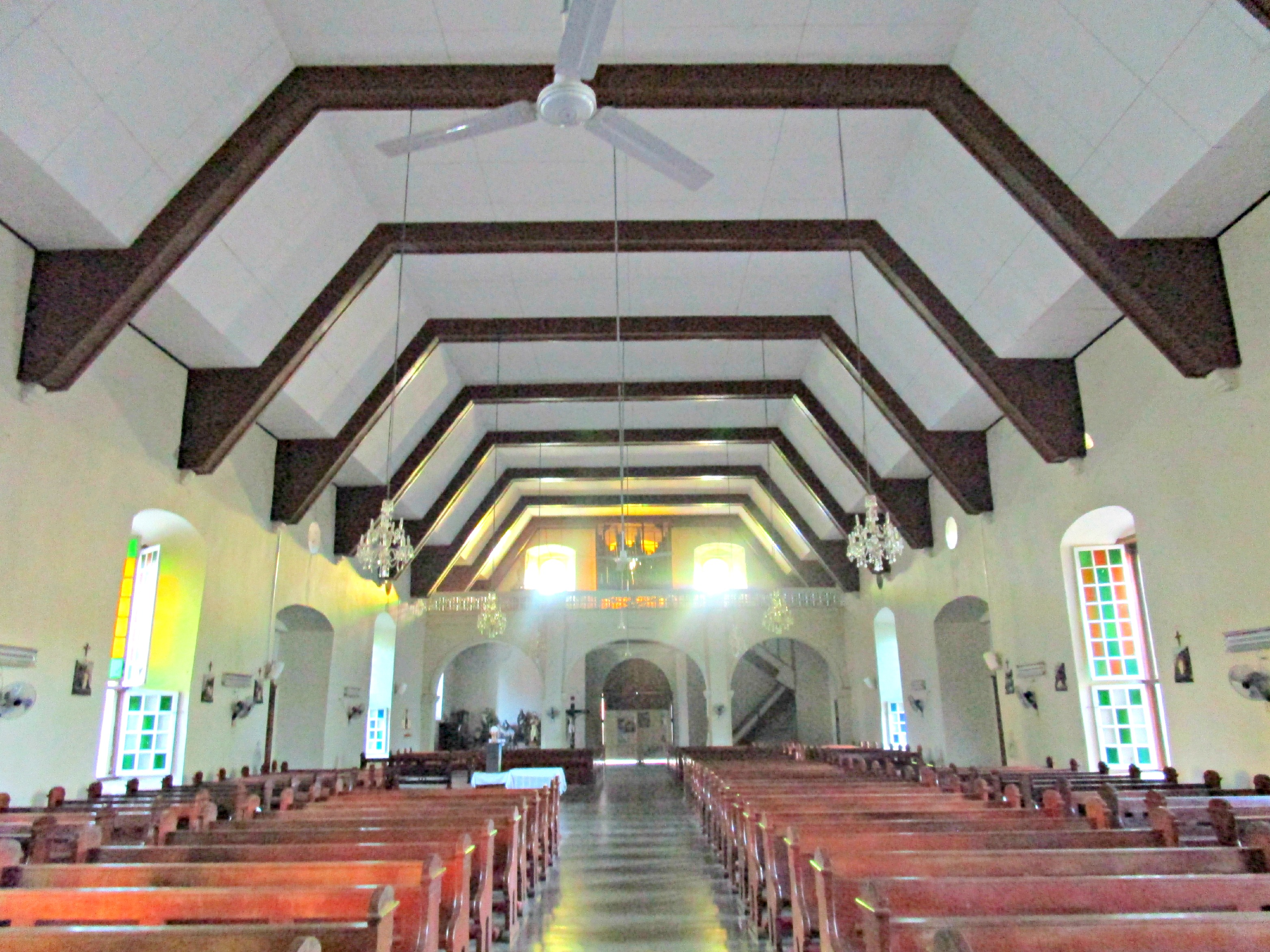
Church interior in 2015

The church is predominantly Baroque in style. Its first level is devoid of any embellishment or fenestration save for the main semicircular arched portal and the wave-like cornices and rounded, high-relief pilasters. A similar motif has been adapted on the second level of the façade, which is pierced by three windows. The center of the softly undulating pediment showcases one blind window encased by pilasters. The curved pediment ends smoothly into two large volutes which seat beside two, large, urn-like finials. The pediment is surmounted by a huge, knob-like finial. To the right of the façade stands the four-tiered bell tower with its rectangular base and octagonal upper levels.
