= Calapan Cathedral =

Roman Catholic church in Oriental Mindoro, Philippines

- Santo Niño Cathedral
- Parroquial Catedral del Santo Niño (Spanish); Parokyang Katedral ni Santo Niño (Filipino)
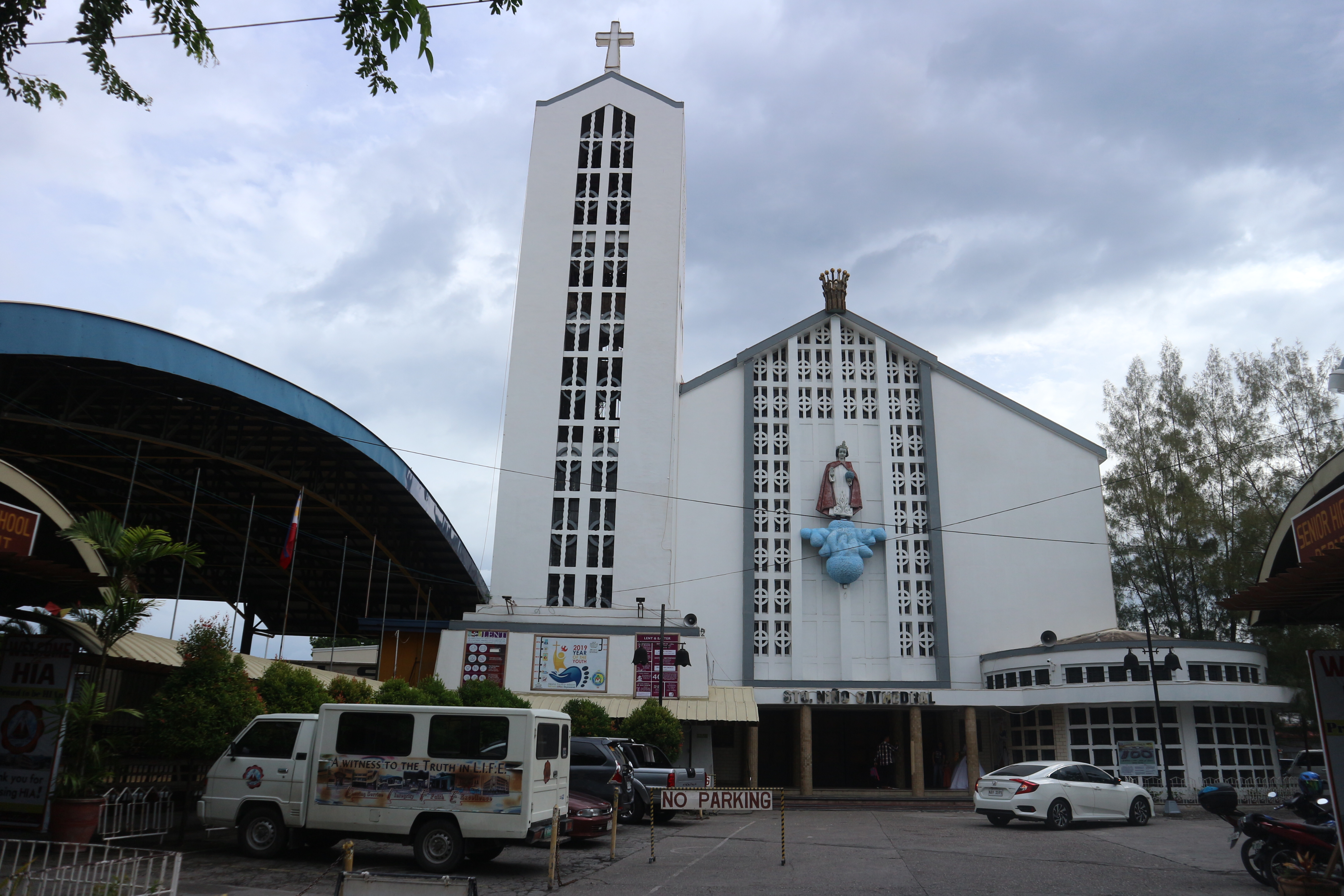
- Cathedral facade in 2019

- Location in Luzon Location in the Philippines
- 13°24′53″N 121°10′49″E
- Location: Calapan, Oriental Mindoro
- Country: Philippines
- Denomination: Roman Catholic

History
- Status: Cathedral
- Founded: 1679
- Dedication: Santo Niño
- Dedicated: 1679

Architecture
- Functional status: Active
- Architectural type: Church building
- Style: Modern
- Completed: 1887, 1962
- Demolished: 1881

Administration
- Province: Lipa
- Metropolis: Lipa
- Archdiocese: Lipa
- Diocese: Calapan
- Deanery: Santo Niño
- Parish: Santo Niño

Clergy
- Bishop: Moises Magpantay Cuevas
- Rector: Andy Peter Lubi

The Santo Niño Cathedral, commonly known as the Calapan Cathedral, is a Roman Catholic cathedral in Calapan, Oriental Mindoro, Philippines, dedicated to the Santo Niño. It is the episcopal seat of the Diocese of Calapan and is a marked historical structure by the National Commission for Culture and the Arts.

== History ==
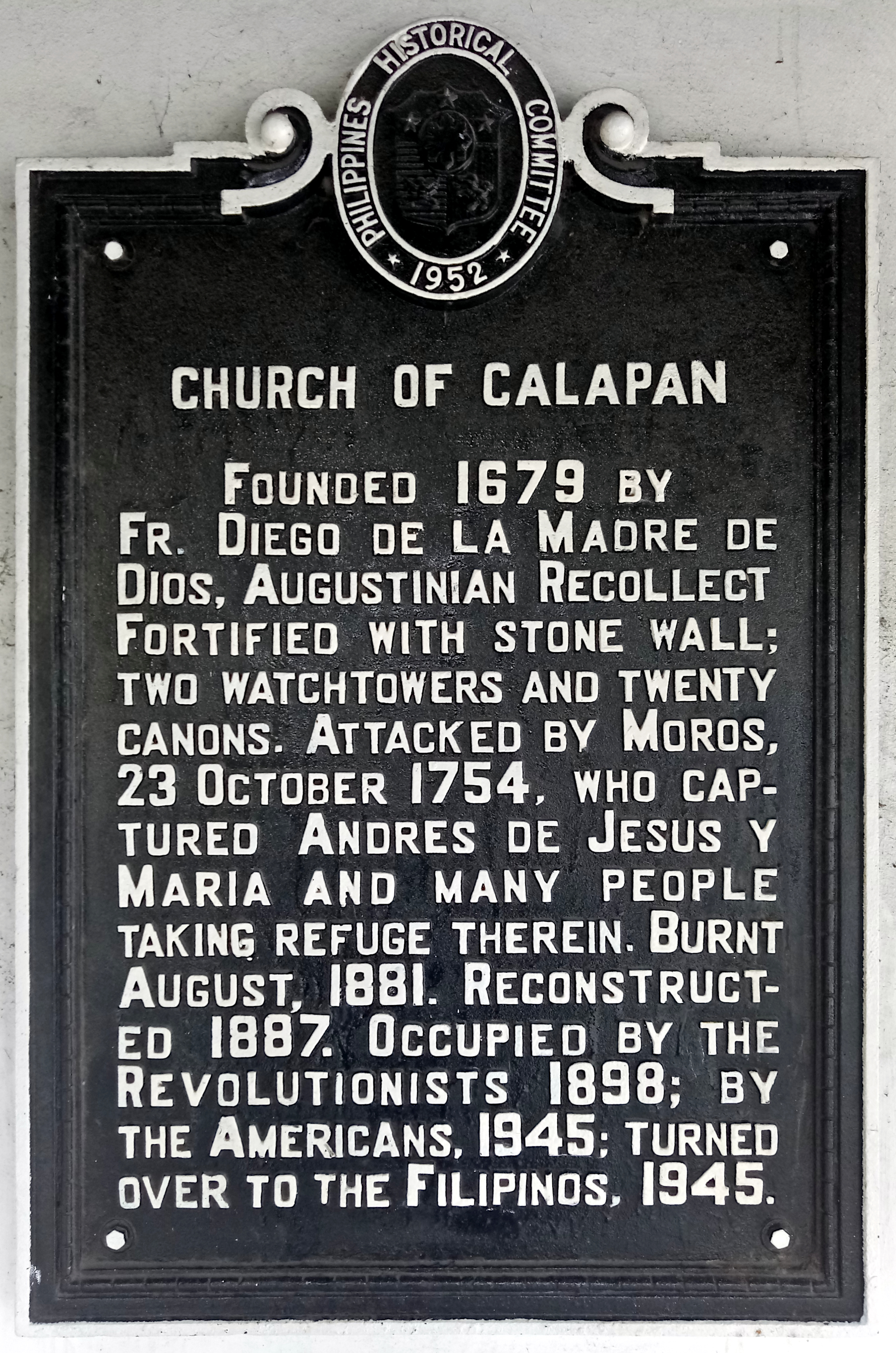
Church PHC historical marker installed in 1952

The parish of Calapan was founded in 1679 by the Augustinian Recollect missionary Diego de la Madre de Dios. Early church structures in the settlement were constructed from light wooden materials typical of early mission churches during the Spanish colonial period. Owing to repeated Moro incursions along the coasts of Mindoro, the parish complex later evolved into a fortified church settlement equipped with defensive walls, watchtowers, and artillery.

In the early 18th century, permission was sought from Spanish colonial authorities to construct a more permanent stone church capable of serving both religious and defensive functions. By around 1733, a church built from coral stone and lime materials had been completed through communal labor undertaken by local residents. During the same period, Calapan suffered several raids by Moro fleets, resulting in widespread destruction in the town and surrounding settlements.

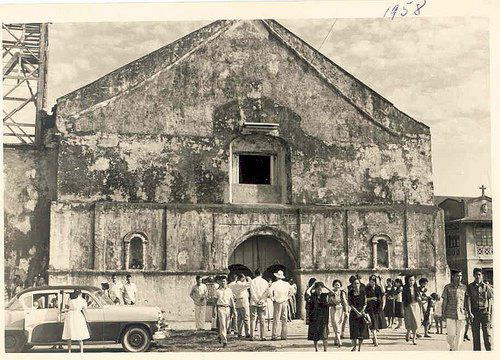
The cathedral's facade in 1958

A major raid in 1754 led to the capture of parish priest Andres de Jesus y Maria along with several inhabitants who had taken refuge inside the church. Subsequent decades saw repeated reconstruction efforts on the church and convento, including the strengthening of surrounding defensive structures and the rebuilding of damaged sections of the parish complex.

Throughout the 19th century, the Cathedral remained one of the principal mission centers of Mindoro under the administration of the Augustinian Recollects. Among its notable clergy was Fr. Ezequiel Moreno y Diaz dela Virgen del Rosario, who served in the parish beginning in 1872 and was later canonized as Saint Ezekiel Moreno by the Catholic Church.

The church and convent were destroyed by fire on August 12, 1881, causing the loss of all parish records. Reconstruction work continued through the 1880s, including the completion of a new convent and the rebuilding of the church within its original stone enclosure.

During World War II, Japanese forces occupied Calapan. Bishop William Finnemann, the first Apostolic Prefect of Mindoro, continued pastoral work during the occupation but later disappeared in 1942 after being taken into Japanese custody.

=== Contemporary ===
Towards the end of the World War II in 1945, the church this time was occupied by the Americans and was turned over to the Filipinos in the same year. In 1951, the apostolic prefecture was elevated to the Apostolic Vicariate of Calapan. In 1962, the present cathedral was finished. The Calapan Vicariate subsequently lost territories to establish the Diocese of Romblon in 1974 and the Apostolic Vicariate of San Jose in Mindoro in 1983. The apostolic vicariate was elevated to a full diocese in March 2026. The cathedral's sanctuary was also renovated ahead of the canonical elevation of Calapan as a diocese on August 7, 2026.

== Gallery ==
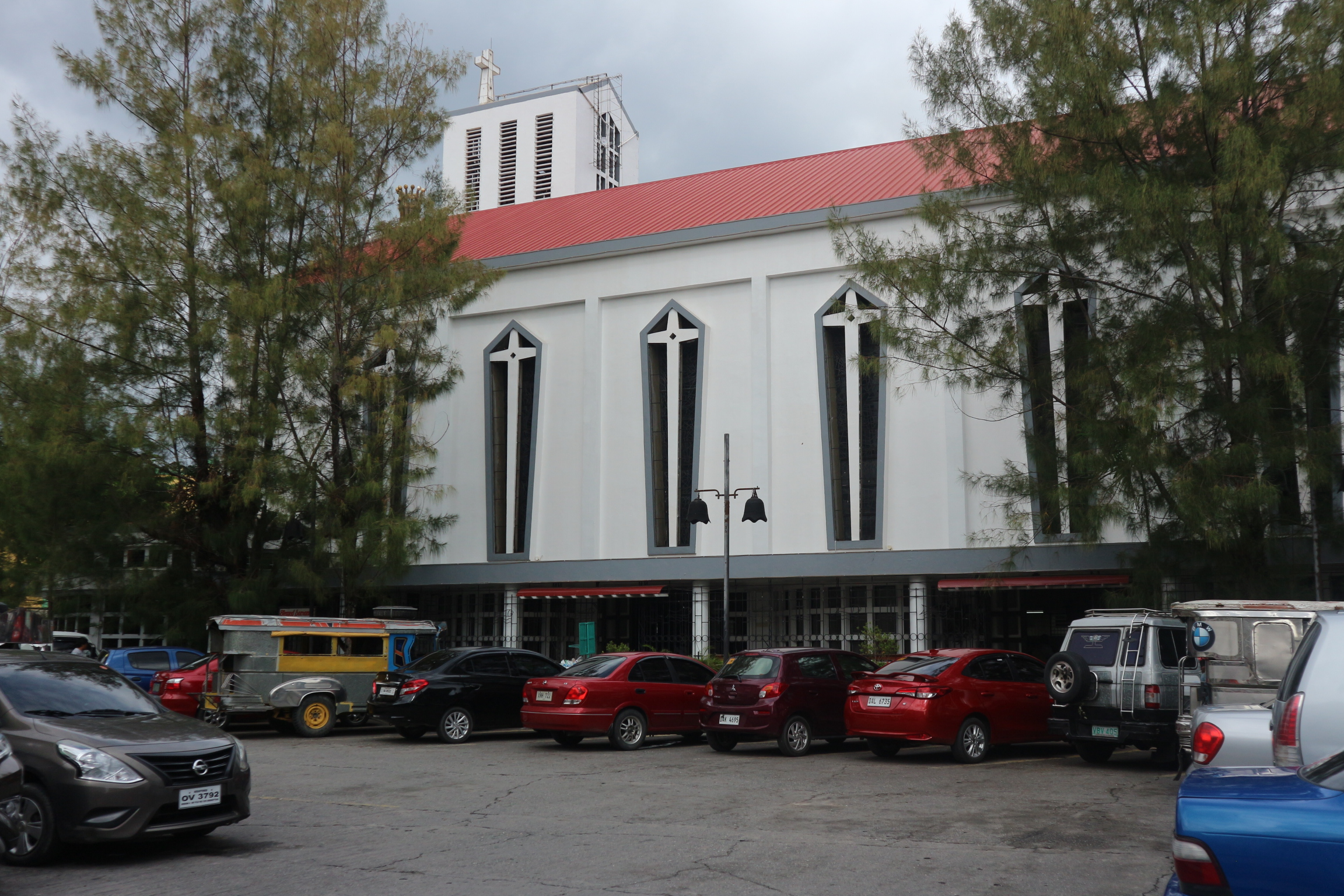
The cathedral's side entrances and parking area

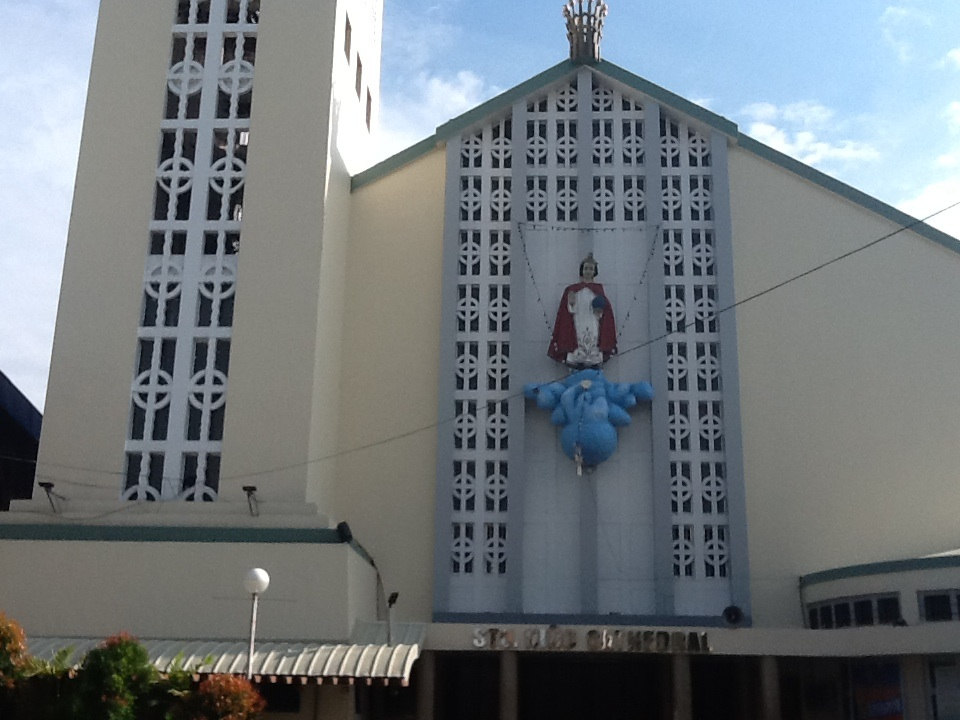
Close-up of breeze block-style features of the facade and the bell tower
