= Moises Cuevas =

Filipino Catholic bishop (born 1973)

The Most Reverend Moises Cuevas
- Bishop of Calapan
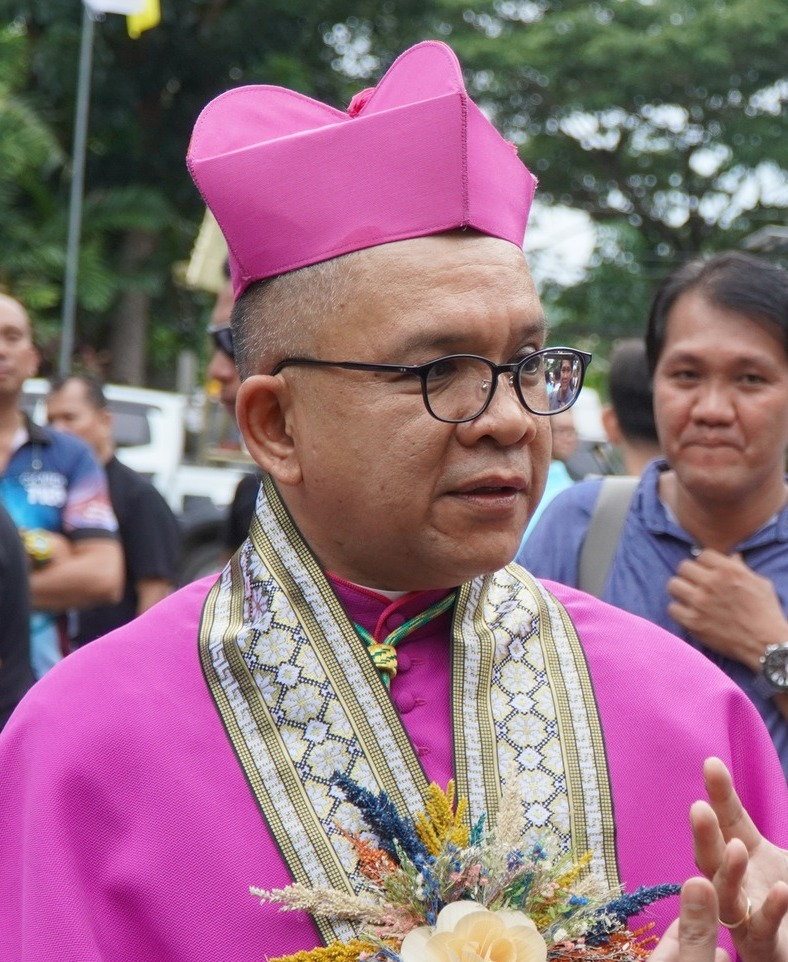
- Cuevas in 2023
- Church: Roman Catholic Church
- See: Diocese of Calapan
- Appointed: March 25, 2026
- Installed: August 7, 2026
- Predecessor: Position established (Note: Warlito Cajandig was his direct predecessor when the diocese was an apostolic vicariate at the time.)
- Previous posts: Apostolic Vicar of Calapan (2023–2026); Auxiliary Bishop of Zamboanga (2020–2023); Apostolic Administrator of Zamboanga (2021–2023)

Orders
- Ordination: December 6, 2000 by Carmelo Morelos
- Consecration: August 24, 2020 by Romulo T. de la Cruz

Personal details
- Born: November 25, 1973 (age 52) Cuenca, Batangas, Philippines
- Motto: Virga Tua Consolatio Mea ("Your rod consoles me")
- Coat of arms

Styles of Moises Cuevas
- Reference style: His Excellency; The Most Reverend
- Spoken style: Your Excellency
- Religious style: Bishop

Moises Magpantay Cuevas (born November 25, 1973) is a Filipino prelate of the Catholic Church. He is currently bishop of the Diocese of Calapan in Oriental Mindoro, Philippines. Before assuming this role, he was the auxiliary bishop of the Archdiocese of Zamboanga and later its apostolic administrator.

== Early life and education ==
Cuevas was born in Cuenca, Batangas, Philippines. He pursued his priestly formation at the Pastor Bonus Seminary in Zamboanga City. His theological studies continued at the Regional Major Seminary of Mindanao in Davao City.

== Priesthood ==
Cuevas was ordained a priest in the Archdiocese of Zamboanga on December 6, 2000. In the years that followed, he took on various responsibilities, including serving as vicar at the Metropolitan Cathedral of the Immaculate Conception in Zamboanga from 2001 to 2003. He later became the rector of the Archdiocesan Shrine of Our Lady of the Pillar and was entrusted with the role of chancellor of the archdiocese from 2003 to 2009. From 2005 to 2007, he was appointed administrator of the archdiocesan pastoral center. He served as parish priest of Santa Maria Parish from 2009 to 2015. Since 2017, he has been director of the commission on the clergy for the archdiocese.

== Episcopacy ==
On March 19, 2020, Pope Francis appointed Cuevas as auxiliary bishop of Zamboanga and Titular Bishop of Maraguia. He was consecrated on August 24, 2020, with Archbishop Romulo Tolentino de la Cruz as principal consecrator and bishops Martin Jumoad and Julius Tonel as co-consecrators.

In August 2021, he was appointed apostolic administrator sede plena of the Archdiocese of Zamboanga, while Archbishop Romulo de la Cruz was recovering from a stroke. He managed the affairs of the archdiocese until the appointment of a new archbishop.

On June 29, 2023, Pope Francis appointed him apostolic vicar of Calapan, succeeding Warlito Cajandig. Cuevas was installed on September 6, 2023, at the Santo Niño Cathedral in Calapan City.

At the time of his appointment, Cuevas was one of the youngest bishops in the Philippines.

On March 25, 2026, Pope Leo XIV elevated the Apostolic Vicariate of Calapan to a full diocese and appointed Cuevas as its first bishop; the new diocese was canonically erected on August 7, the same day when he was canonically installed.

== Advocacy ==
Cuevas has consistently emphasized the importance of simplicity and humility in the life of the clergy. He has spoken against material excess and has urged priests to remain dedicated to their pastoral mission. In February 2023, he addressed concerns over clergy members who displayed extravagant lifestyles, calling such behaviors a "blinding addiction" that distracted them from their spiritual responsibilities.

He advocates for the protection of the Verde Island Passage (VIP), emphasizing its ecological importance and the threats it faces, such as overfishing, pollution, and climate change. Citing Pope Francis' Laudato si', he stresses that preserving VIP is crucial for biodiversity and the livelihoods of millions of fishermen, warning that its degradation could lead to displacement and food insecurity.

== Notes ==
Catholic Church titles
Preceded by Warlito Cajandig	Apostolic Vicar of Calapan; June 29, 2023 – August 7, 2026	Succeeded by Himself as Bishop of Calapan
Preceded by Himself as Apostolic Vicar of Calapan	Bishop of Calapan; August 7, 2026 – present	Incumbent
Preceded by Ulrich Neymeyr	— TITULAR — Bishop of Maraguia; August 24, 2020 – September 6, 2023	Succeeded by Zenildo Lima da Silva
