= Archdiocesan Shrine of Espiritu Santo =

Roman Catholic church in Manila, Philippines

- Santuario Arquidiocesano del Espíritu Santo (Spanish)
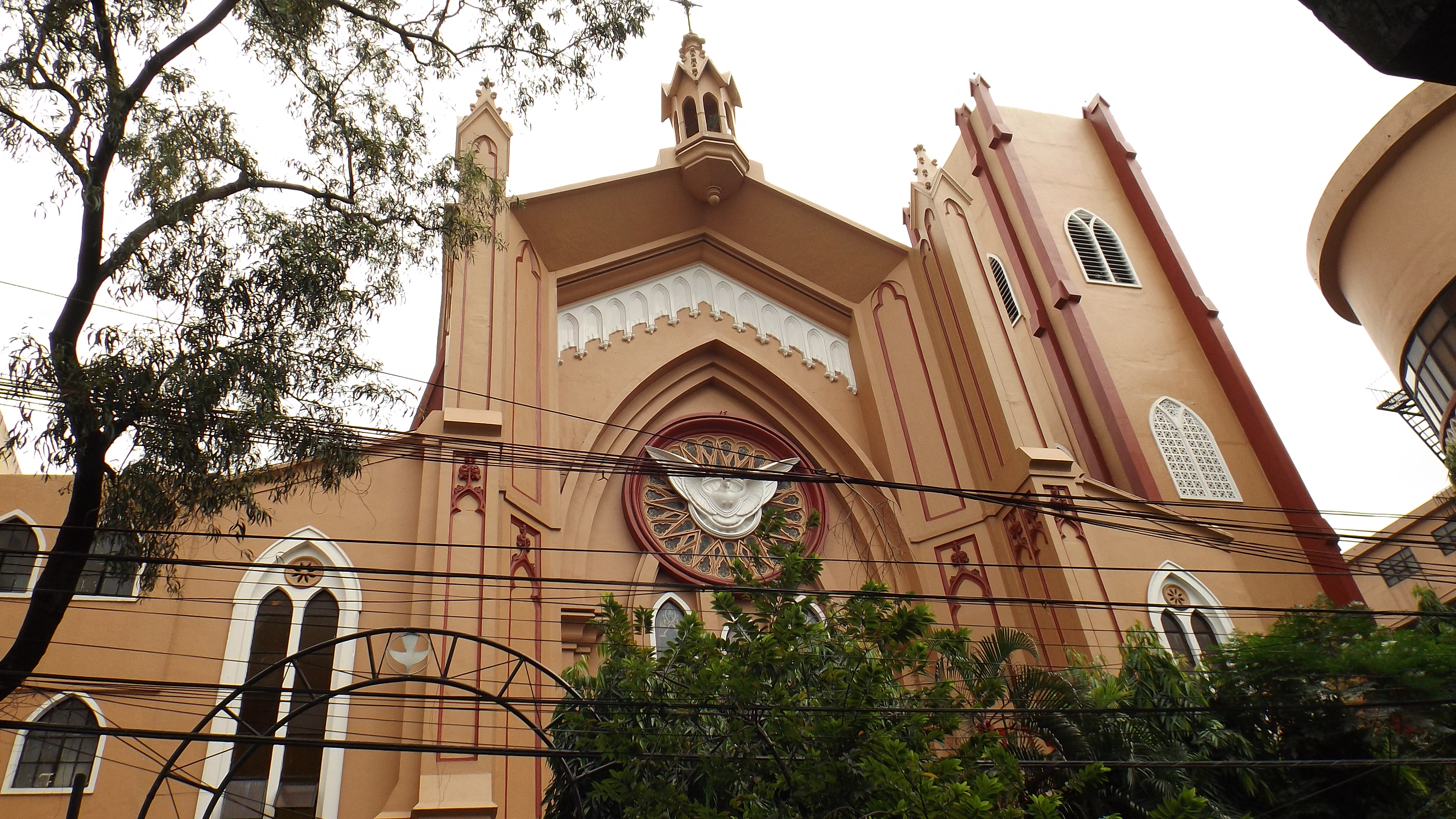
- Church facade in 2014
- Archdiocesan Shrine of Espiritu Santo
- 14°37′02″N 120°59′00″E
- Location: Santa Cruz, Manila
- Country: Philippines
- Denomination: Roman Catholic

History
- Former name: Espiritu Santo Parish
- Founded: December 19, 1926

Architecture
- Completed: May 14, 1932

Administration
- Archdiocese: Manila
- Deanery: Espiritu Santo
- Parish: Espiritu Santo

Clergy
- Rector: Eymard Dennis Peter Marcelino S. Odiver
- Dean: Nolan A. Que

The Archdiocesan Shrine of Espiritu Santo, formerly known as Espiritu Santo Parish, is a Roman Catholic parish church belonging to the Archdiocese of Manila that is located at 1912 Rizal Avenue corner Tayuman Street, Santa Cruz, Manila, Philippines. It was declared an Archdiocesan Shrine by Cardinal Luis Antonio G. Tagle, Archbishop Emeritus of Manila, on June 8, 2014, the Solemnity of the Pentecost. Eymard Dennis Peter Marcelino S. Odiver is the current parish priest and rector of the church since 2022.

== History ==
=== Construction of the church ===
In 1913, a public cemetery where the church now stands was closed due to health concerns. Espiritu Santo Parish was established on December 19, 1926, and placed under the administration of the Divine Word Fathers (SVD). William Finnemann was its first parish priest.

In December 1931, Jose Duserhund took over as parish priest. A crypt containing 444 niches built underneath the altar was sold to local residents; the proceeds were used to construct the church. Its church was fully completed and solemnly blessed on May 14, 1932, on the occasion of the Parish fiesta.

The church remained standing and unscathed during the Japanese occupation of the Philippines and the battle for the liberation of Manila. Mr. and Mrs. Jose G. Lopez of Job Lema donated the image of the Blessed Trinity in 1951, sculpted by the popular Maximo Vicente including its carriage.

On September 29, 1952, a tabernacle costing eight thousand pesos arrived from the United States of America.

In November 1955, the edifice of the Blessed Virgin Mary at the corner of Rizal Avenue and Tayuman Street was blessed by Archbishop Rufino J. Santos. In 1956, a baptismal font was donated by Mr. Jose Pablo and Company.

On July 11, 1958, the marble main altar was consecrated by Cardinal Santos. Inside the tomb of the main altar were the relics of Saint Matias the Apostle, Saint Irmina, and Saint Maria Goretti. The "Descent of the Holy Spirit" upon the apostles on the ark in the sanctuary was painted by Mr. Jose Santos. A monstrance which was made in 1899 and a church ceiling with a Gothic design were donated by the relatives of Matias.

The marble altar in the middle of the sanctuary was completed and blessed in 1968. In the same year, the pipe organ costing seventy-two thousand pesos was acquired and installed by H. Schblitzki, and was solemnly blessed by Bienvenido M. Lopez on November 24, 1968.

=== Church renovations ===
The SVD Fathers turned over the Espiritu Santo Parish to the diocesan clergy on May 2, 1973, with Gorgonio Encarnacion as first diocesan parish priest. A four-story multi-purpose building was constructed to replace the old convent.

Under Emmanuel Sunga's three-year service from 1990, church facilities were improved and a big generator was installed at the back of the church.

Norberto Habos' five-year service from 1993 was dedicated to continuous improvement in church facilities. Because of his eye for beauty and artistic taste, the magnificent retablo of the Holy Spirit at the dome of the main altar, the chapel of Saints, and the stained glass windows which depicted the 15 mysteries of the Rosary were installed.

Under the incumbency of Albert G. Salonga (1998–2015), the computerized church bells were put to use. The two-storey Formation Center was constructed; the Adoration Chapel, parish office, candle stand corner, coffee shop, and Shrine of Our Lady of Perpetual Help were renovated. The image of Rosa Mystica was acquired for the May flower offering. More importantly, the 43-year-old pipe organ was fully rehabilitated through the help of fund-raising projects. The rehabilitation costed two hundred forty-five million pesos. The rehabilitation was carried out by Diego Cerra Organbuilders, custodians of the Las Pinas Bamboo Organ.

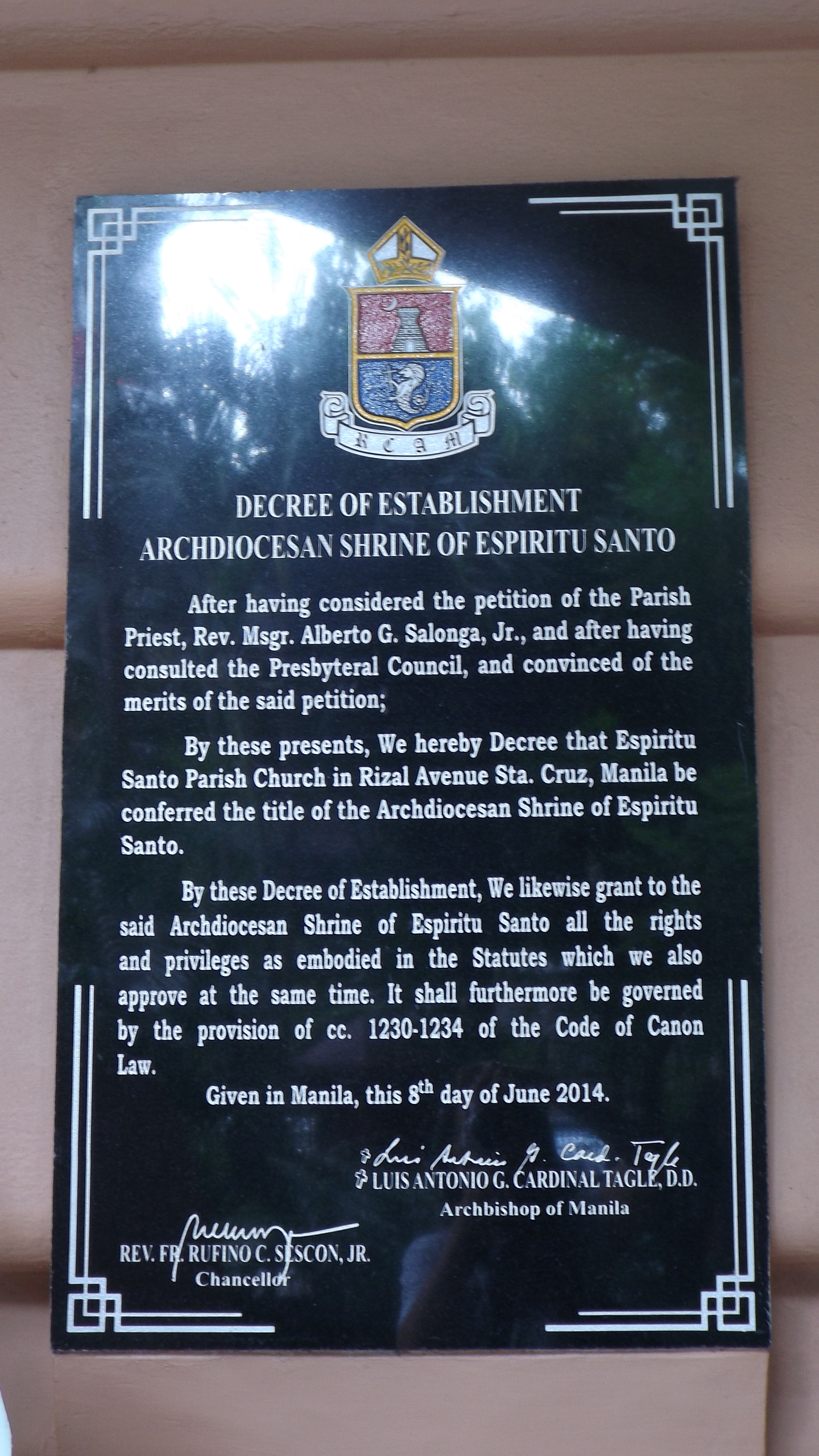
Decree of Establishment as an Archdiocesan Shrine

=== Establishment as an Archdiocesan Shrine ===
On June 8, 2014, the title Archdiocesan Shrine of Espiritu Santo was granted in the dedication held during the 88th fiesta anniversary officiated by Cardinal Tagle. Twelve crosses were dedicated in the church posts, The altar was dressed with linens and red roses, and white Malaysian flowers decorated the altar. The kissing of the newly consecrated altar was opened to the public. Albert G. Salonga lit the candles and passed them to La Liga and BEC parishioners to light the twelve posts.

== Parish priests ==
- Gorgonio Encarnacion (1973-1990) (deceased)
- Emmanuel Sunga (1990-1998)
- Albert G. Salonga, Jr. (1998-2015)
- Wilmer R. Rosario (2015–2022)
- Eymard Dennis Peter Marcelino S. Odiver (2022–present)

== Gallery ==
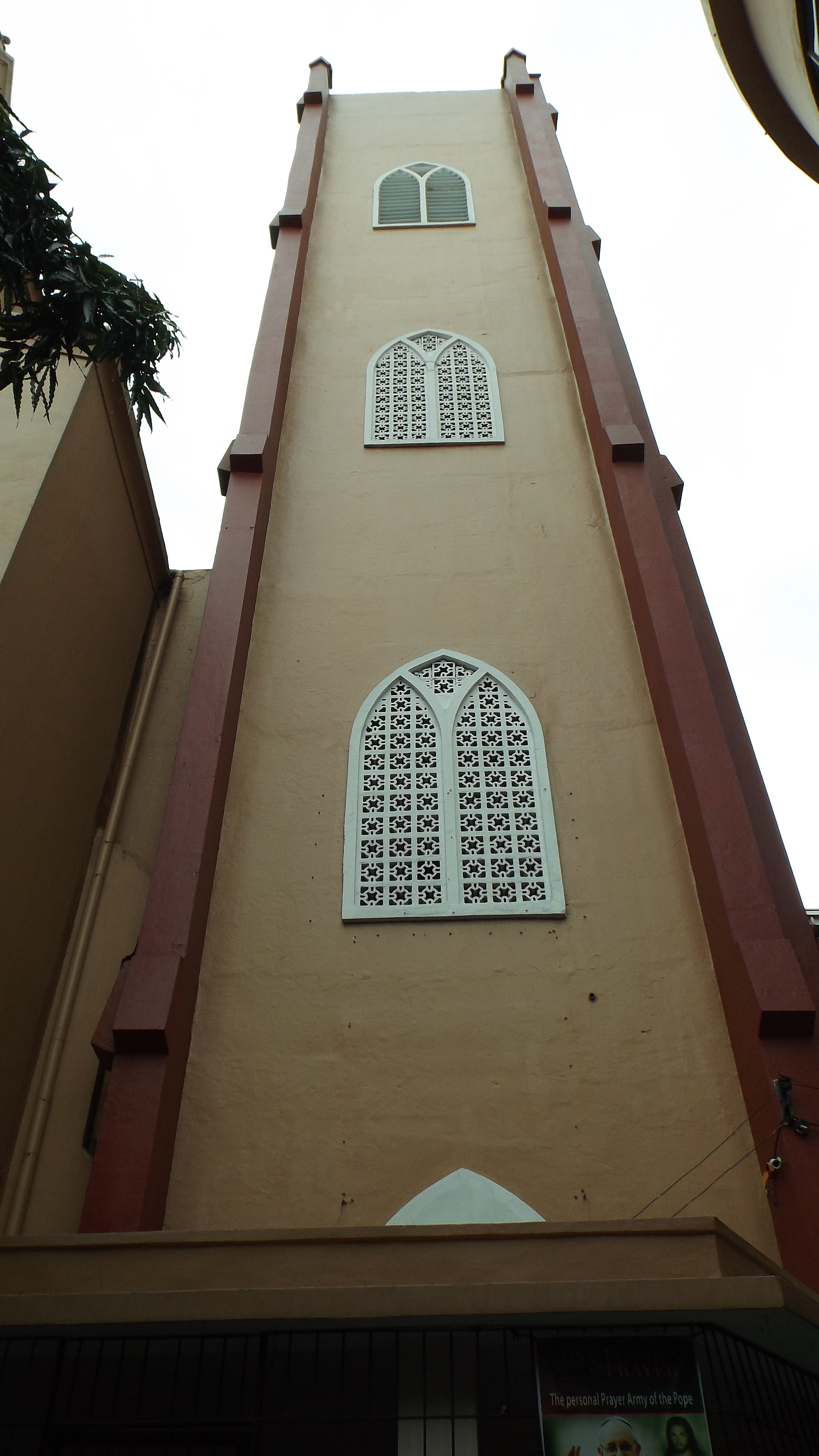
Bell tower

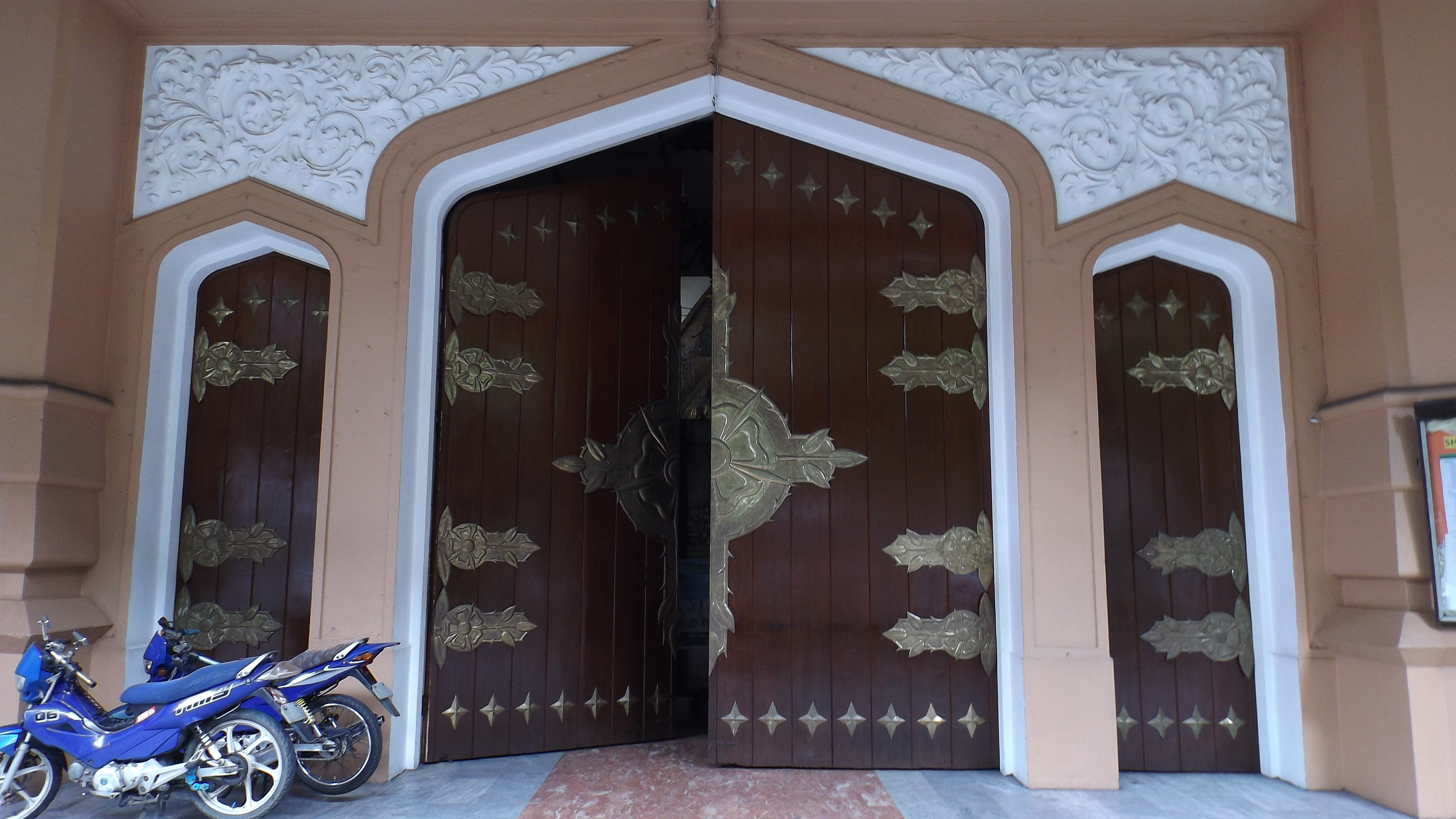
Main entrance door

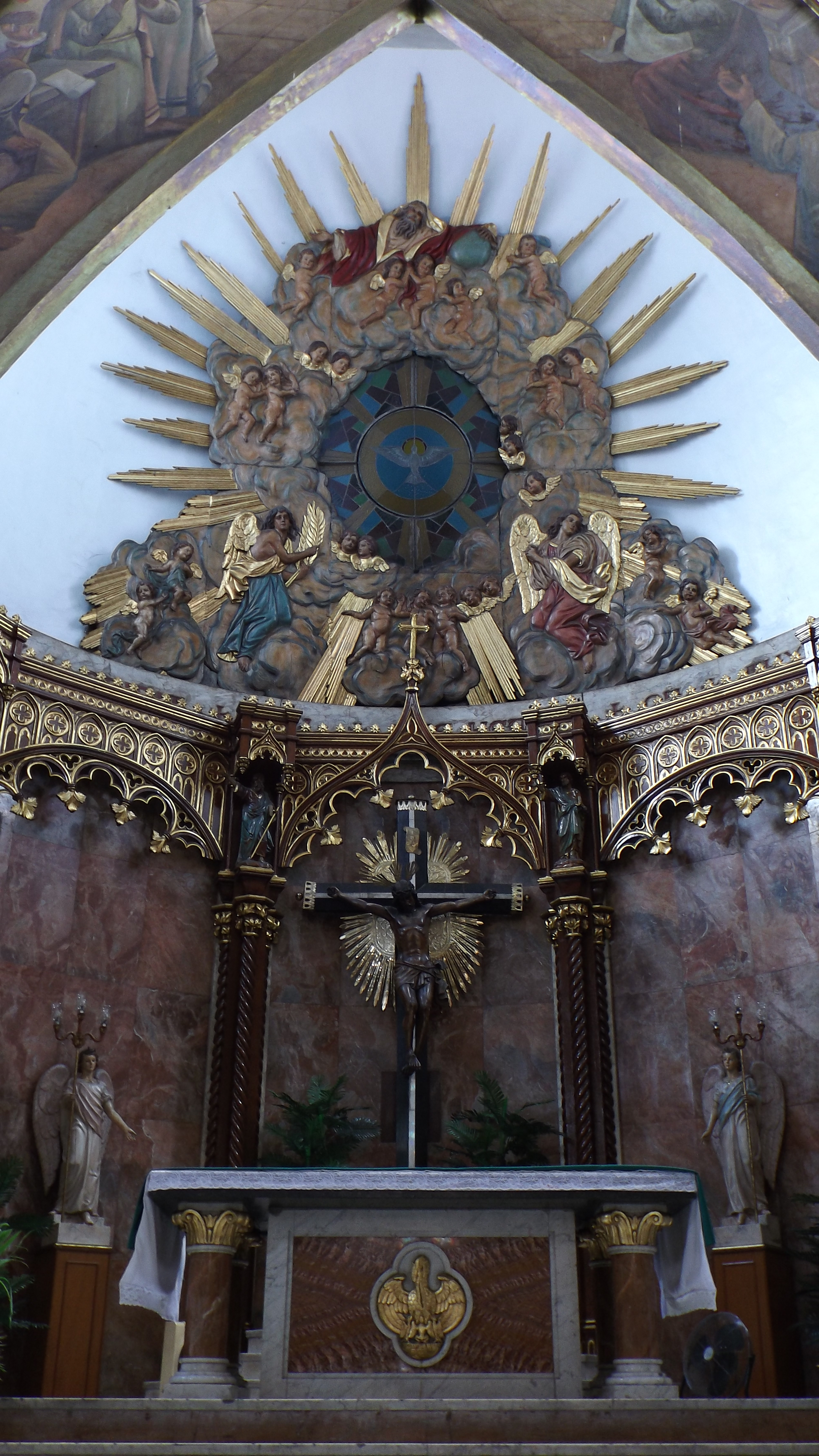
Retablo

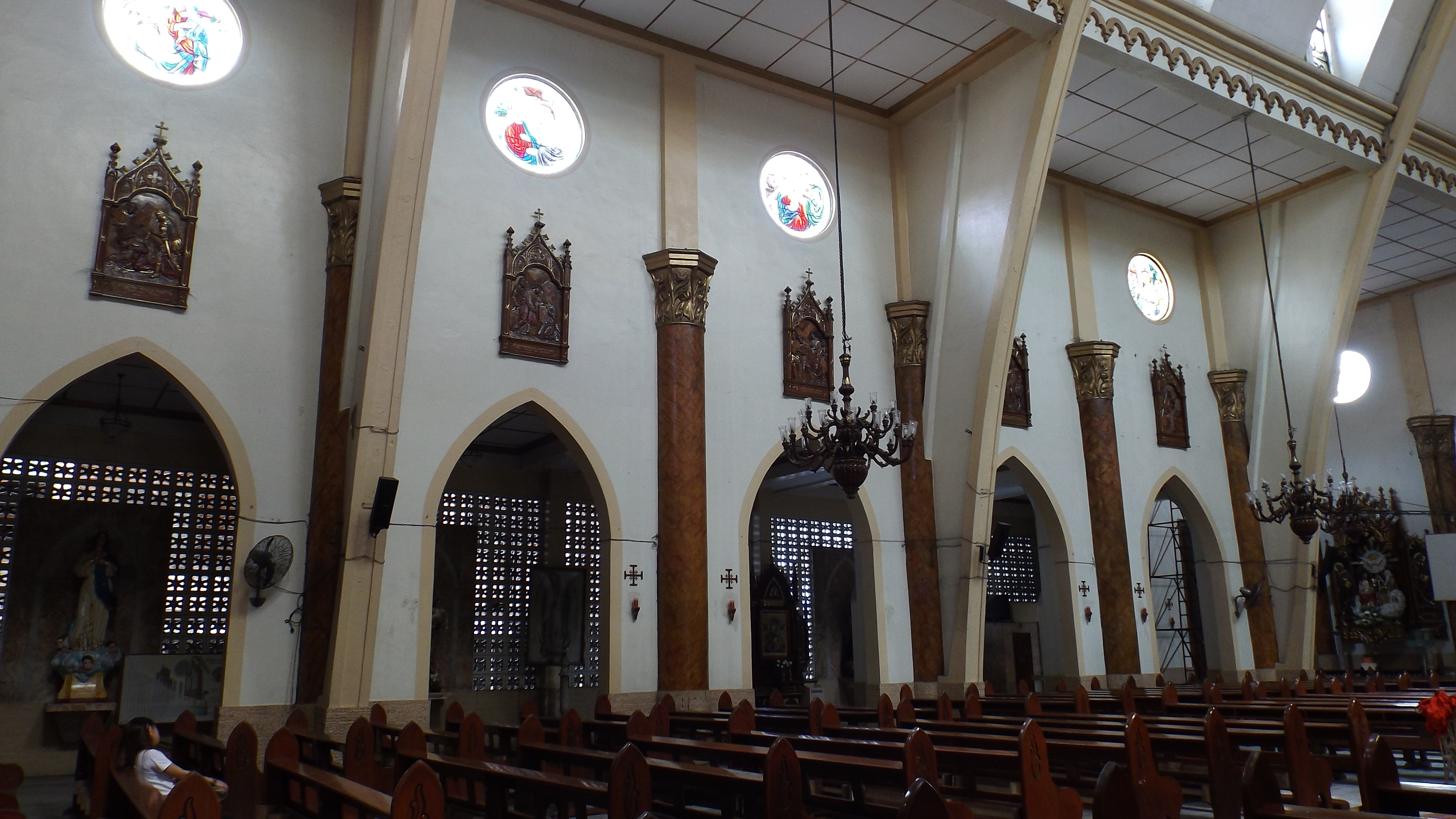
Church interior, left side

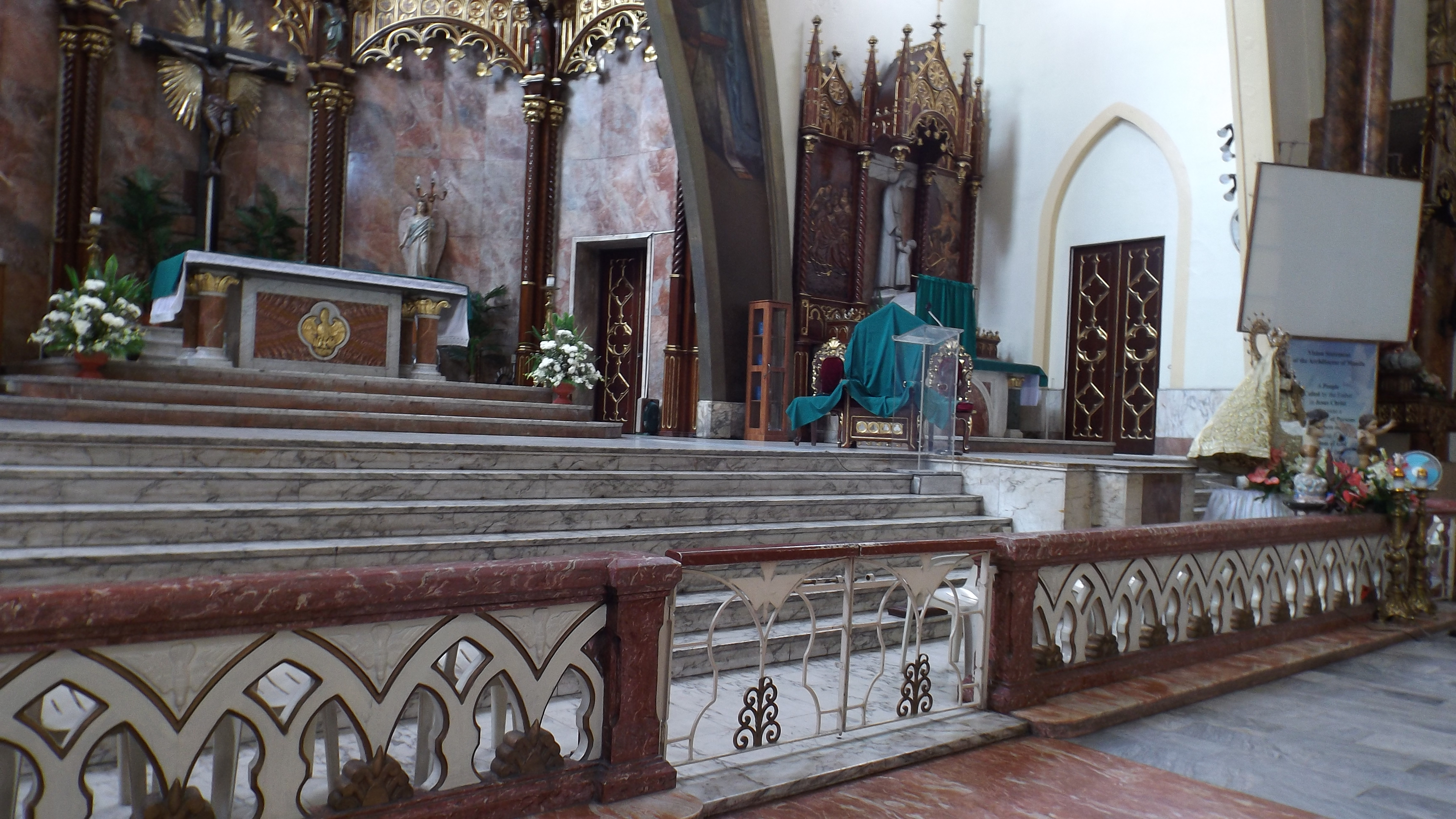
Chancel

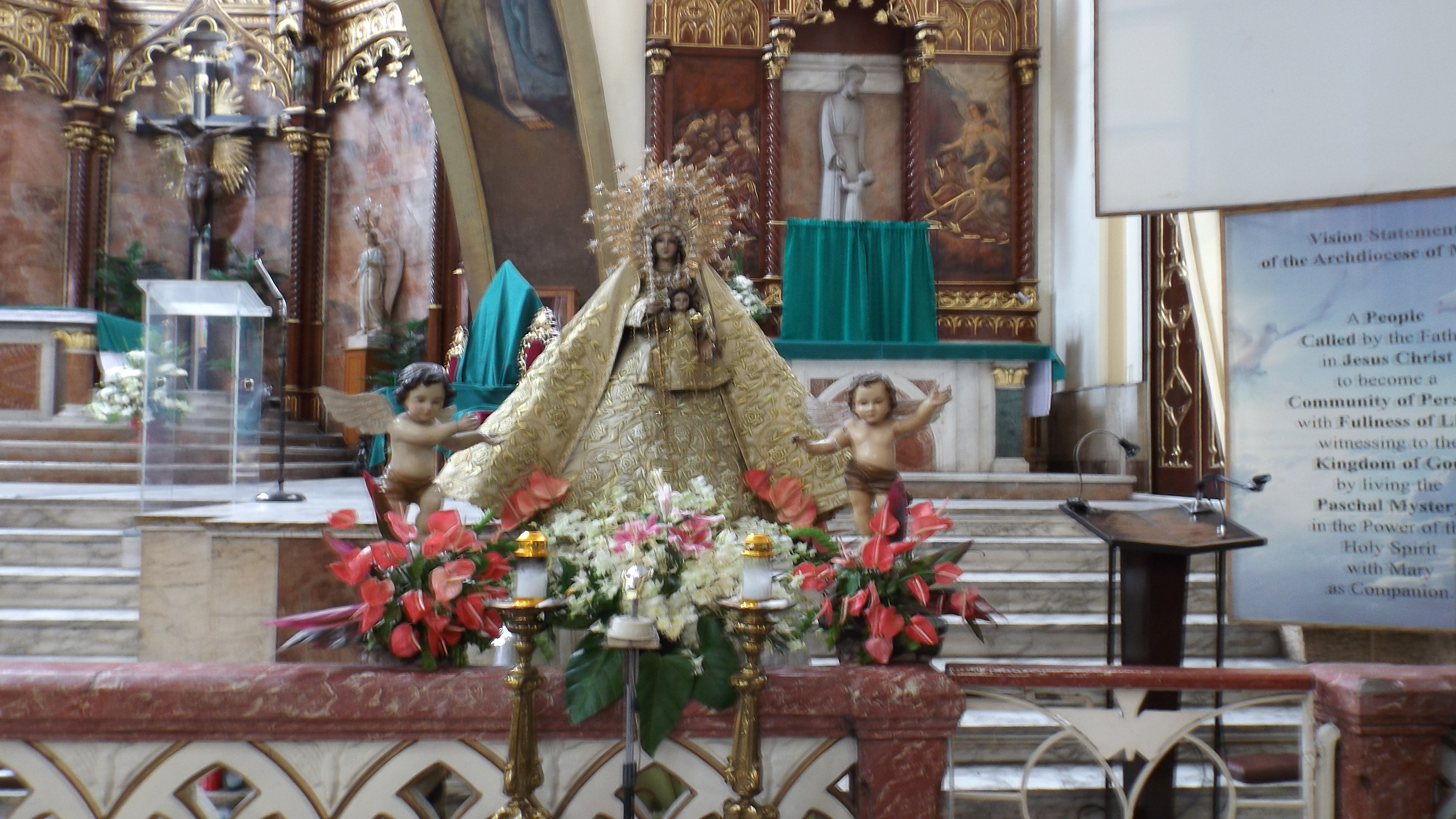
Virgin Mary

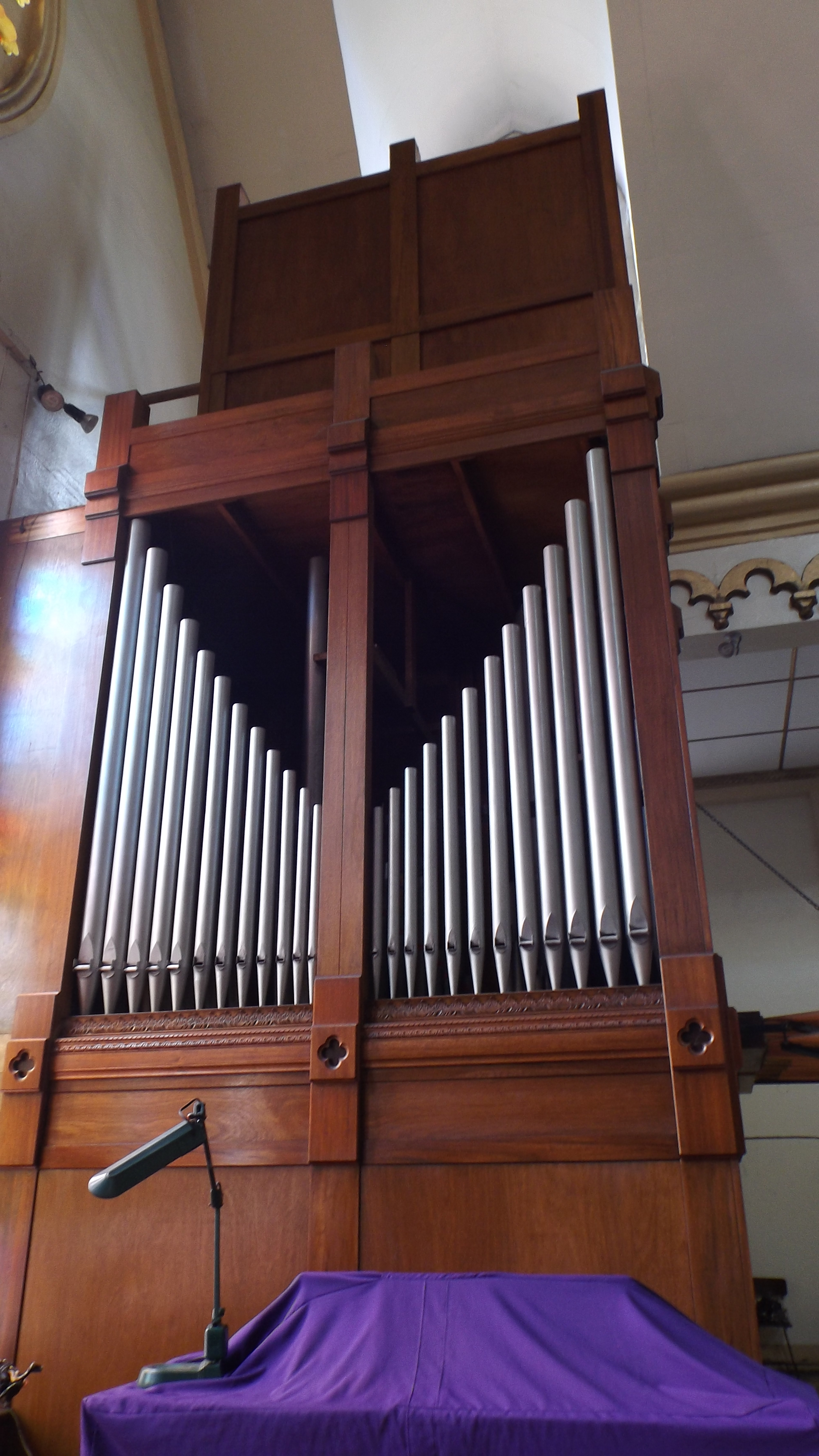
Pipe Organ

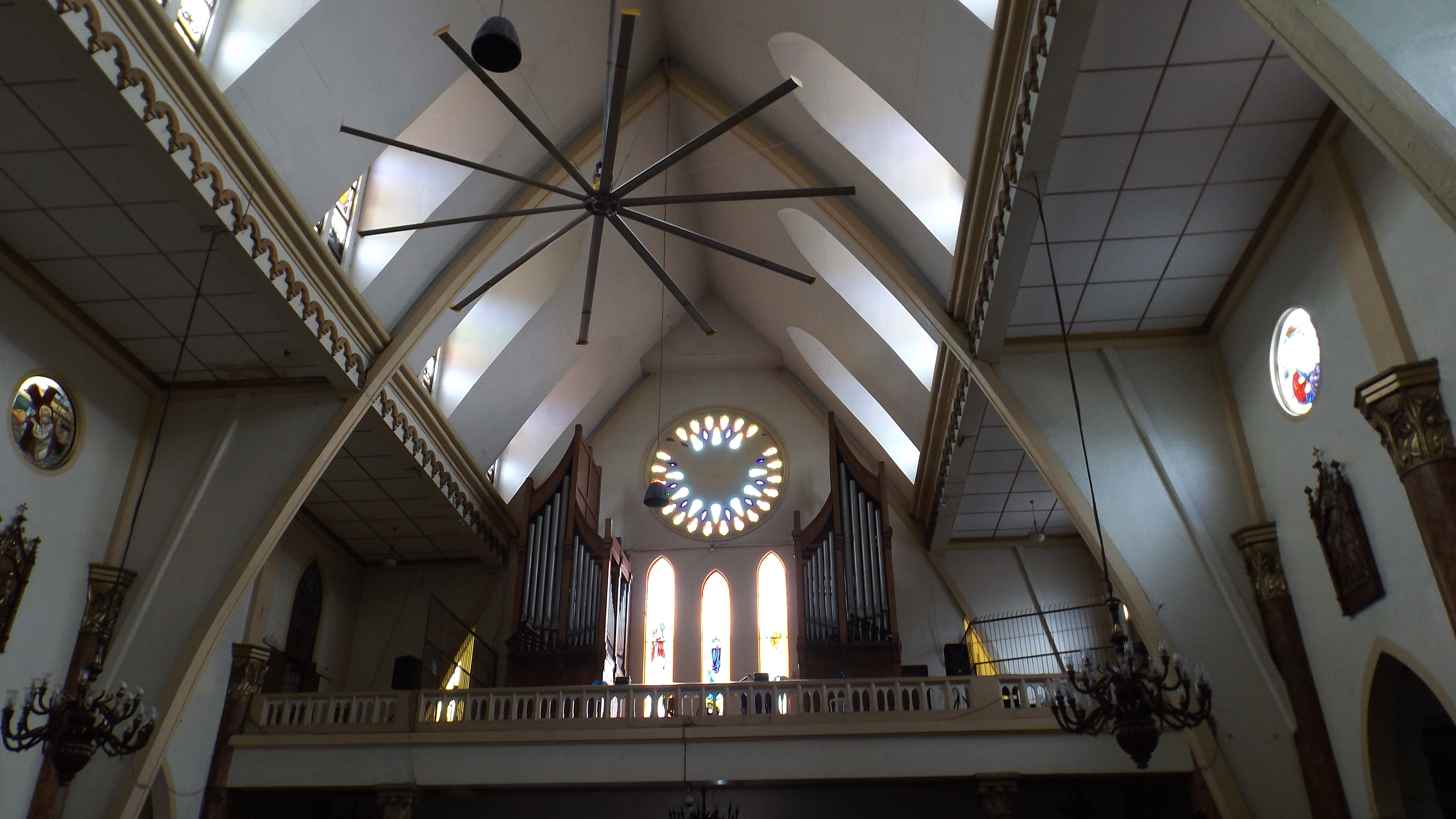
Choir loft

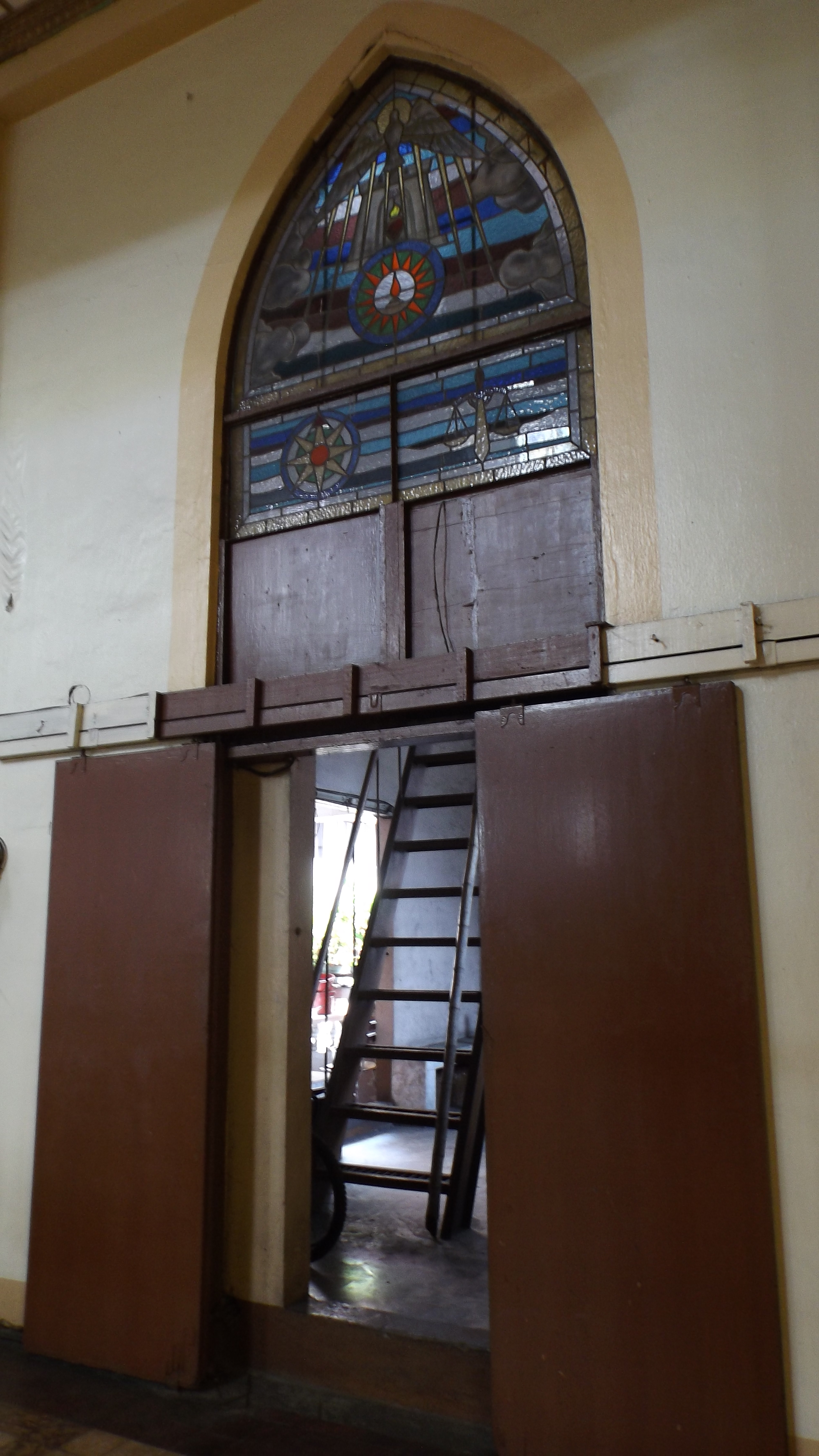
Portal to the bell tower

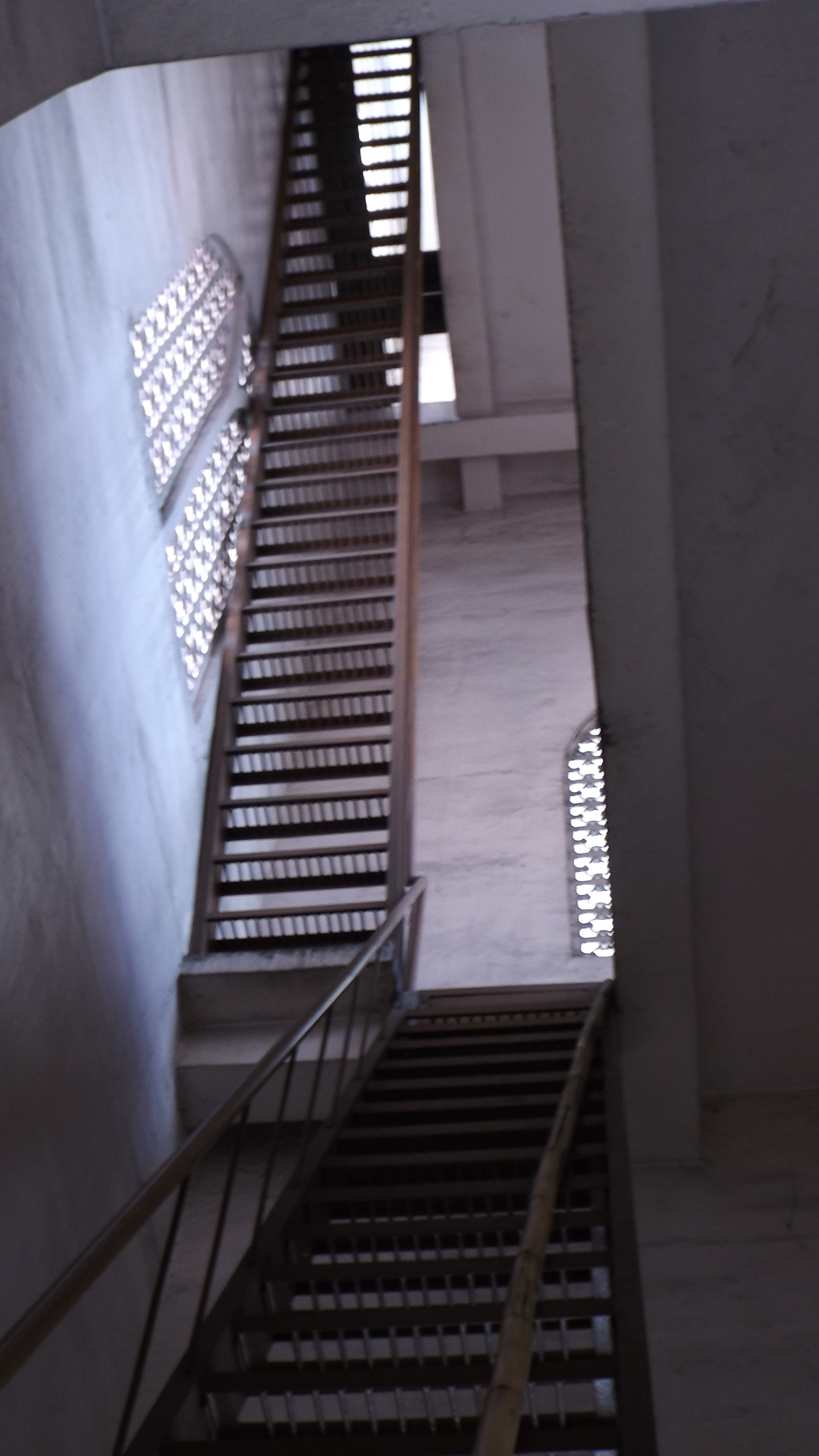
Steep staircase of the bell tower

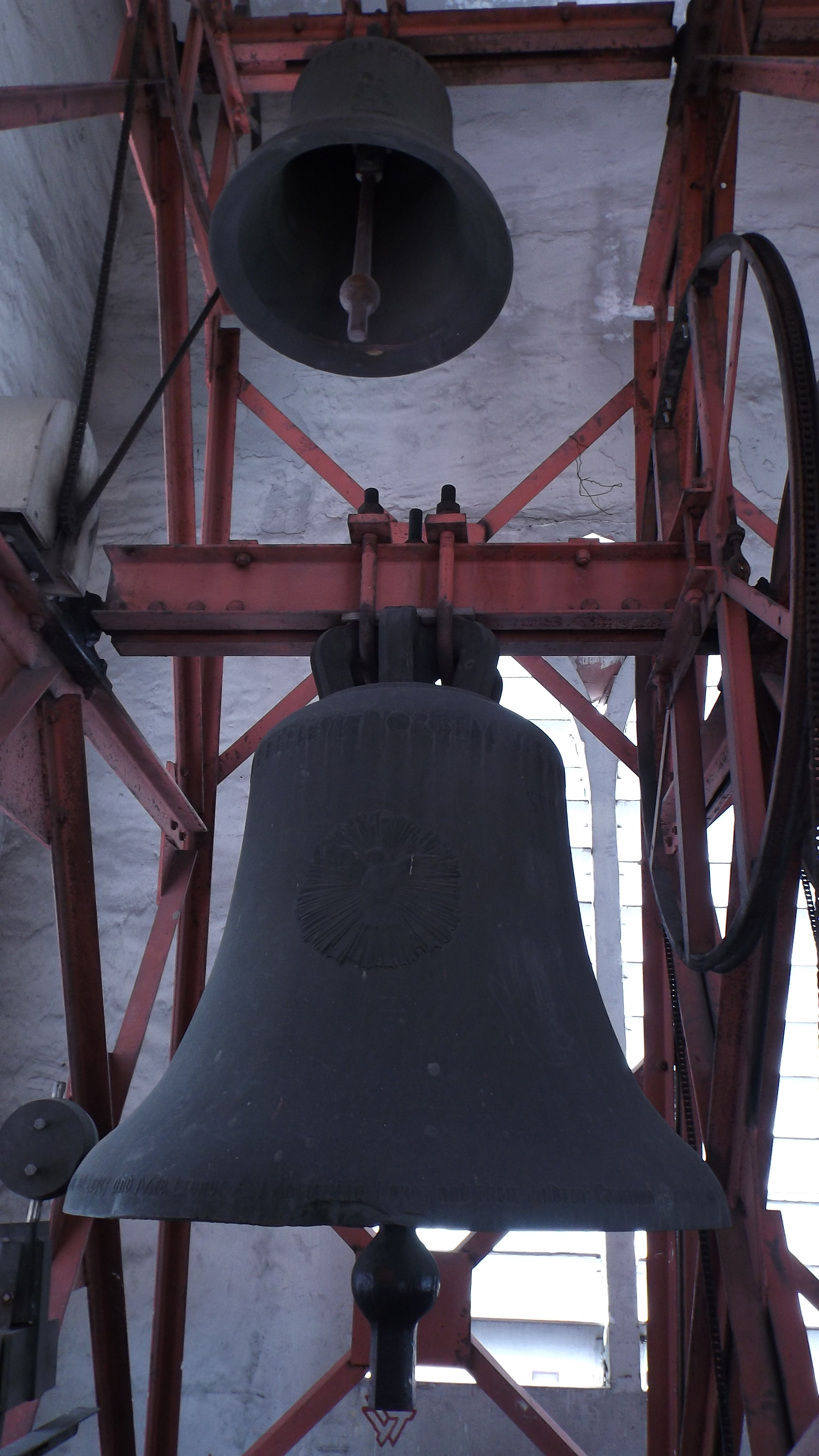
Old bells, set to ring automatically

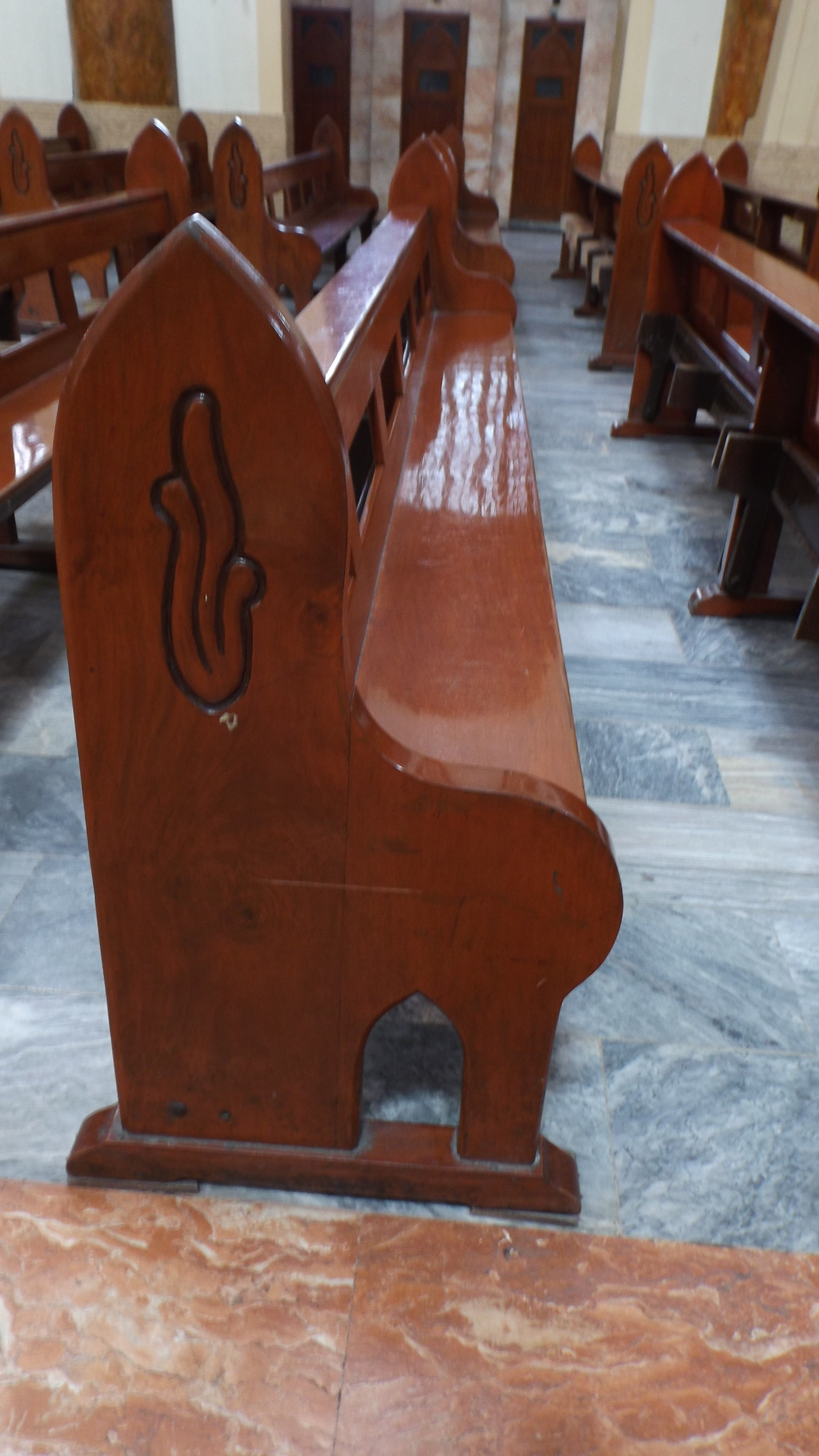
Pews with carved woodworks
