= Ausafa =

Ancient Roman settlement

Ausafa or Uzappa was a Roman era town, in the Roman province of Africa Proconsularis and in late antiquity Byzacena.

== Location ==
The town is tentatively identified with the ruins of Ksour-Abd-El-Melek near the town of Maktar in Siliana Governorate, northern Tunisia.

In antiquity, the town was the seat of an ancient episcopal see of the Roman province of Byzacena.

== Bishopric ==
We know of two bishops of Ausafa. The first is Felix, who was present at the Council of Carthage (256), where he discussed the problem of the Lapsi. Secondly Salvius Ausafensis participated in the Council of Cabarsussi, held in 393 by Maximianus, a dissident sect of the Donatists, and he signed the acts of that council. Today Ausafa survives as a titular bishopric, the bishop was Warlito Itucas Cajandig, Apostolic Vicar of Calapan.
