= Warlito Cajandig =

Filipino Catholic bishop (1944–2025)

The Most Reverend Warlito Cajandig
- Apostolic Vicar Emeritus of Calapan
- Church: Roman Catholic Church
- See: Apostolic Vicariate of Calapan
- Appointed: April 17, 1989
- Installed: June 21, 1989
- Term ended: November 7, 2022
- Predecessor: Simeon O. Valerio
- Successor: Moises M. Cuevas
- Other post: Titular Bishop of Ausafa (1989–2025)

Orders
- Ordination: March 21, 1970 by Antonio Floro Frondosa
- Consecration: June 21, 1989 by Jaime Sin

Personal details
- Born: Warlito Itucas Cajandig; January 30, 1944 Dumarao, Capiz, Japanese-occupied Philippines
- Died: October 21, 2025 (aged 81) Iloilo City, Philippines
- Denomination: Roman Catholic
- Motto: Fiat Voluntas Tua "Thy will be done"
- Coat of arms

Styles of Warlito Cajandig
- Reference style: His Excellency; The Most Reverend
- Spoken style: Your Excellency
- Religious style: Bishop

Warlito Itucas Cajandig (January 30, 1944 – October 21, 2025) was a Filipino prelate of the Roman Catholic Church. He was the Apostolic Vicar of Calapan from 1989 to 2022.

== Early life and education ==
Born on January 30, 1944, in Dumarao, Capiz, Warlito Cajandig received his primary education at Dumarao Elementary School. He pursued secondary studies at Our Lady of Snows Academy from 1950 to 1956, followed by a brief period at Iloilo High School in 1956–1957. He later entered St. Pius X Seminary, where he completed both his high school and college-level philosophy studies. His theological formation took place at St. Vincent Ferrer Seminary in Jaro, Iloilo City, where he studied from 1962 to 1966. Furthering his pastoral education, he took a pastoral course at the East Asian Pastoral Institute from 1966 to 1970.

== Priesthood ==
Cajandig was ordained a priest for the then Diocese of Capiz on March 21, 1970, at the Immaculate Conception Cathedral in Roxas City. His pastoral ministry included assignments in various parishes. He began as a parochial vicar in Dumalag, Capiz, from 1970 to 1971 before taking on the role of parish priest in Calatrava, Romblon, from 1971 to 1978. He later served as the parish priest of San Agustin, Romblon, from 1981 until his appointment as bishop in 1989.

== Episcopacy ==
On April 17, 1989, Pope John Paul II appointed Cajandig as the Apostolic Vicar of Calapan and Titular Bishop of Ausafa. He received his episcopal consecration on June 21, 1989, at the Manila Cathedral, with Jaime Cardinal Sin as his principal consecrator.

== Illness, retirement and death ==
In September 2018, Cajandig suffered a mild stroke, which resulted in a coma and required subsequent brain surgery. Due to his declining health, Pope Francis appointed Fr. Nestor Adalia as the apostolic administrator of the vicariate in November 2018.

On November 7, 2022, the Holy See announced that Pope Francis had liberated Cajandig from the office of vicar apostolic due to health concerns. Following his retirement, Pope Francis appointed Moises M. Cuevas as the new Apostolic Vicar of Calapan on June 29, 2023.

Cajandig died on October 21, 2025, in Iloilo City, at the age of 81.

Catholic Church titles
Preceded by Simeon O. Valerio	Apostolic Vicar of Calapan; June 21, 1989 – November 7, 2022	Succeeded by Moises M. Cuevas
Preceded by Fulgence Werner Le Roy	— TITULAR — Bishop of Ausafa; June 21, 1989 – October 21, 2025	Succeeded by Vacant
