= Diocese of Calapan =

Roman Catholic Diocese in the Philippines

Diocese of Calapan Dioecesis Calapaniensis Diyosesis ng Calapan Diocesis de Calapan

Catholic
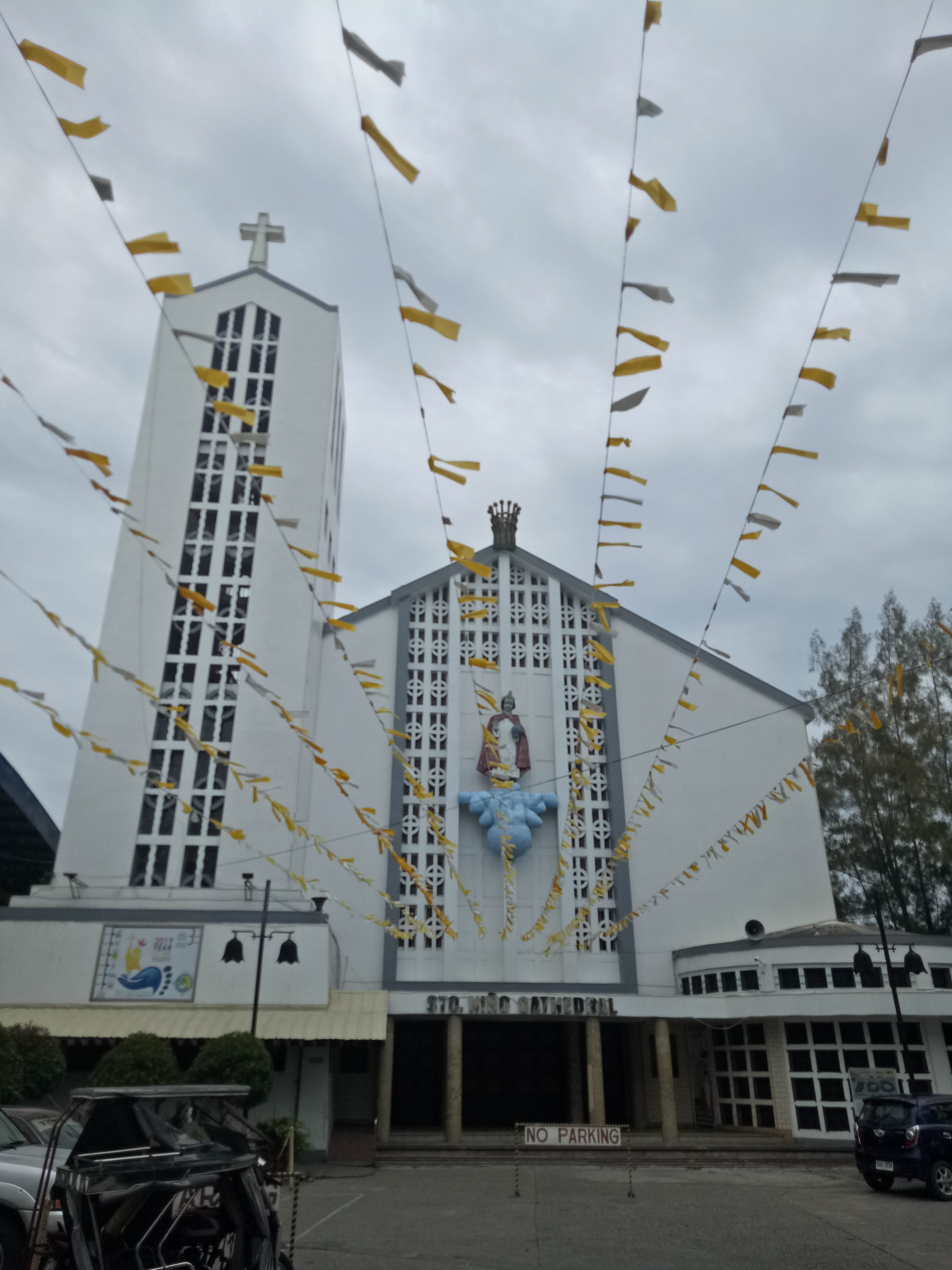
- Calapan Cathedral

- Coat of arms

Location
- Country: Philippines
- Territory: Oriental Mindoro
- Ecclesiastical province: Lipa
- Metropolitan: Lipa
- Deaneries: 8
- Coordinates: 13°24′53″N 121°10′49″E

Statistics
- Area: 4,364 km^{2} (1,685 sq mi)
- Population: Total; Catholics: (as of 2021); 1,003,940; 931,000 (92.7%)
- Parishes: 21
- Churches: 41
- Schools: 14

Information
- Denomination: Catholic Church
- Sui iuris church: Latin Church
- Rite: Roman Rite
- Established: July 2, 1936
- Cathedral: Cathedral-Parish of Santo Niño
- Patron saint: Santo Niño
- Secular priests: 45

Current leadership
- Pope: Leo XIV
- Bishop: Moises Magpantay Cuevas
- Metropolitan Archbishop: Gilbert Armea Garcera
- Vicar General: Carlos P. Paglicawan

Map
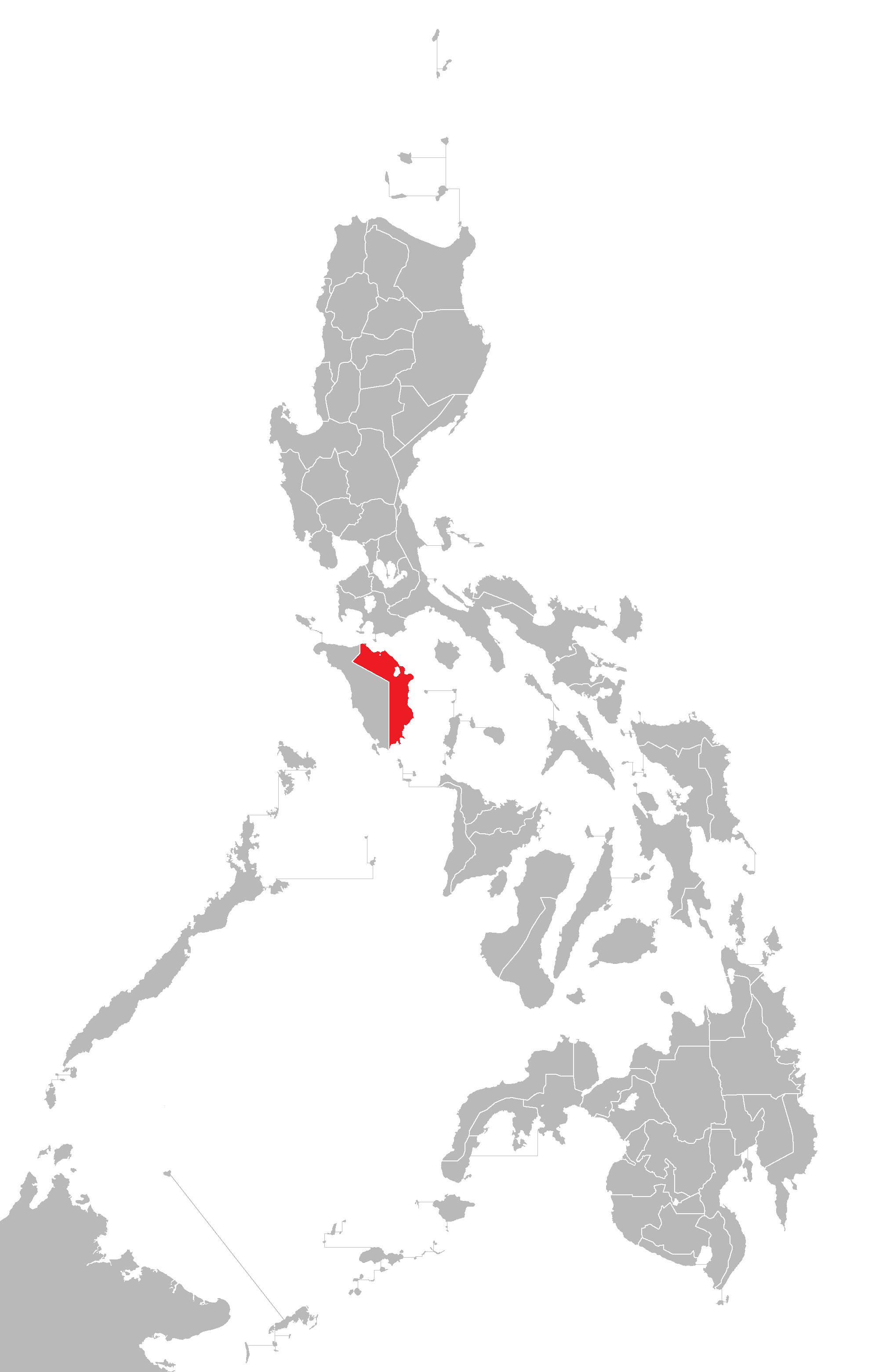
- Jurisdiction of the Diocese of Calapan.

The Diocese of Calapan (Latin: Dioecesis Calapanensis) is a Latin Church diocese of the Catholic Church in Oriental Mindoro, Philippines. In 2010, 756,000 residents had been baptized out of about 814,000 inhabitants.

It has six related parishes. The episcopal residence and seat of the diocese is the Santo Niño Cathedral located in Calapan.

== History ==
The Apostolic Prefecture of Mindoro was created on July 2, 1936, with territories taken from the Roman Catholic Dioceses of Jaro and Lipa, both of which were later elevated into archdioceses.

On July 12, 1951, Pope Pius XII, through the papal bull Merit ab Apostolic, elevated the apostolic prefecture to an apostolic vicariate.

On December 19, 1974, and January 27, 1983, portions of its territory were lost to the creation of the Diocese of Romblon and the Apostolic Vicariate of San Jose in Mindoro.

On March 25, 2026 Pope Leo XIV has elevated the Apostolic Vicariate of Calapan to a diocese and appointed its apostolic vicar, Moises Cuevas, as its first bishop. The diocese was canonically erected on August 7, 2026.

== Ordinaries ==
Apostolic Prefects of Mindoro (1936–1951)

Name		Period in office
1.	Bishop William Finnemann, S.V.D.	December 04, 1936 – October 10, 1942
2.	Fr. Henry Ederle, S.V.D.	June 06, 1946 – July 12, 1951

Apostolic Vicars of Calapan (1951–2026)

Name		Period in office	Coat of arms
1.	Bishop Wilhelm Josef Duschak, S.V.D.	July 12, 1951 – November 26, 1973, resigned	
2.	Bishop Simeon Oliveros Valerio, S.V.D.	November 26, 1973 – September 26, 1988, resigned	
3.	Bishop Warlito Itucas Cajandig	April 28, 1989 – November 7, 2022, ceased	
4.	Bishop Moises Magpantay Cuevas	June 29, 2023 – August 7, 2026, elevated as first Bishop of Calapan	

Ordinaries of the Diocese of Calapan (2026–present)

Name		Period in office	Coat of arms
1.	Bishop Moises Magpantay Cuevas	August 7, 2026 – present (15 days)	
