= Maraguia =

Africa Proconsularis (125 AD)

The Diocese of Maraguia (in Latin: Dioecesis Maraguiensis) is a suppressed and titular see of the Roman Catholic Church.

The diocese of Maraguia was centered on an ancient Roman town of the Roman province of Byzacena called Maraguia which is tentatively identifiable with the ruins of Ksar-Margui in modern Tunisia. The only known bishop of this African diocese is Boniface, who took part in the synod assembled in Carthage in 484 by the Arian King Huneric of the Vandal Kingdom, after which Boniface was exiled. Today, the diocese of Maraguia survives as a bishopric holder. On 27 September 2023, the seat is assigned to Bishop-Elect Zenildo Lima da Silva, auxiliary bishop of Manaus and Titular Bishop of Maraguia.
