= William Finnemann =

Roman Catholic bishop

Servant of God William Finnemann SVD
- Apostolic Vicar of Calapan
- Bishop Finnemann ca. 1937
- Church: Roman Catholic Church
- Diocese: Calapan
- See: Calapan
- Appointed: 4 December 1936
- Term ended: 26 October 1942
- Successor: Henry Ederle
- Other posts: Auxiliary Bishop of Manila (1929-36); Titular Bishop of Sora (1929-36); Prefect of Mindoro (1936-42)

Orders
- Ordination: 29 June 1911
- Consecration: 21 May 1929 by Michael James O'Doherty

Personal details
- Born: Wilhelm Finnemann; 18 December 1882 Soest, North Rhine-Westphalia; German Empire
- Died: 26 October 1942 (aged 59) Near Verde Island, Batangas, Philippines

William (Wilhelm) Finnemann (December 18, 1882 – October 26, 1942) was a German prelate of the Society of the Divine Word, auxiliary bishop of Manila and apostolic vicar of Calapan, the Philippines. He was martyred by the Japanese through being thrown into the sea near Verde Island off the coast of Batangas City, Batangas.

== Early life ==
Born in Büninghausen, Soest, North Rhine-Westphalia in the German Empire, to Bernhard and Elizabeth Nasse. Finnemann was the second oldest of fourteen children. He learned shoemaking from his uncle to help with the family expenses.

== Education ==
The pastor of the Hultrop, Dr. Bernhard Köper, invited him to study in a Latin Catholic public school, where he proved a good student.

Young Finnemann wrote to various missionary religious orders asking to be admitted. Arnold Janssen, founder of the Society of the Divine Word, accepted. With his parents' permission and a letter of recommendation from Köper, Finnemann entered the seminary in April 1900. Köper had also generously offered to cover the cost. Finnemann was ordained as priest on October 1, 1911.

== Priesthood ==
In 1912, Finnemann came to the Philippines. He was assigned to Abra, a province in the northern Philippines. For five years, he set about establishing parishes, building schools and handling pastoral care. He became a naturalized Filipino. With the outbreak of World War I, in 1918 he was taken into protective custody by the Americans and brought to the USA, winding up at the Society's St. Mary's Mission Seminary in Techny, Illinois where he remained for some years. He was made professor of Latin and Greek from 1920-1922. He later returned to Abra and from 1923-1926 he was made Procurator of the Society of the Divine Word in the Philippine Islands. In 1926, he became the parish priest of the new Holy Ghost Church which was put under the administration of his order.

== Bishop ==
In 1929, he was appointed Auxiliary Bishop of Manila, and served as chairman of the first National Eucharistic Congress. Finnemann also became Vicar General of the Curia Eclesiastica and Administrator of Obras Pias at the Archbishop's Palace. In 1936, he was named prefect apostolic of Mindoro (now Apostolic Vicariate of Calapan), and returned home to Hultrop for a brief visit.

During the Japanese occupation of World War II, Bishop Finnemann publicly denounced the arbitrary acts of Japanese soldiers against the civilian population and vigorously resisted the occupation of church property. He refused to allow women and girls to be raped by Japanese soldiers. Finnemann was frequently arrested and subjected to beatings. He resisted plans to escape saying that a shepherd cannot abandon his flock.

On October 26, 1942, he was taken aboard a military boat on the pretext of being transferred to Manila for a court martial. The bishop was aware he was unlikely to survive. Once out in the deep waters between Calapan and Batangas, he was bound and thrown overboard because he refused to turn over to the Japanese army a convent of the Holy Spirit Sisters for use as a brothel.

== Cause of beatification ==
Finnemann is currently in consideration for beatification. On December 7, 1999, he was declared Servant of God.

== Legacy ==
The Knights of Columbus dedicated a park to Finnemann named Bishop William J. Finnemann, SVD Memorial Plaza on 12 Quezon Dr, Calapan, Oriental Mindoro, Philippines.

== See also ==
- List of Filipinos venerated in the Catholic Church
