= USS Araner (IX-226) =

Ship of the United States Navy

History

United States
- Name: Juan de Fuca; Araner
- Namesake: Juan de Fuca; Aran Islands
- Builder: Oregon Shipbuilding
- Laid down: 15 November 1942
- Launched: 27 December 1942
- Acquired: 23 September 1945
- In service: 23 September 1945
- Out of service: 22 August 1946
- Stricken: 29 October 1948
- Fate: Sold for scrap 29 January 1948

General characteristics
- Displacement: 14,269 tons
- Length: 422 ft 8 in (128.83 m)
- Beam: 57 ft (17 m)
- Draft: 27 ft 8 in (8.43 m)
- Propulsion: Steam
- Complement: 110

The USS Araner (IX-226) was laid down as the liberty ship SS Juan de Fuca under a Maritime Commission contract (MCE hull 1747) on 15 November 1942 at Vancouver, Washington, by the Oregon Shipbuilding Company (Note: A joint venture of Todd and Kaiser shipbuilding companies.) and launched on 27 December 1942. The ship was delivered to the War Shipping Administration (WSA) on 11 January 1943 and immediately placed under a standard WSA operating agreement with Weyerhauser Steamship Company.

While during service in the Atlantic and Mediterranean she came under fire at least once, on 4 October 1943, and was credited with downing two attacking aircraft and assisting in driving off the remaining planes. She continued to serve in the Liberation of the Philippines, participating in the Battle of Mindoro, coming under fire again. On 21 December 1944, she was hit by a kamikaze near Panay whilst taking troops and supplies to Mindoro; two of these troops were killed, and a fire broke out in the cargo hold, although the ship was able to continue under her own power, despite sustaining some damage, and narrowly avoided a bombing run by another plane in the same attack. She continued in service, but was subsequently hit by an aerial torpedo on the evening of 30 December 1944, two miles off the coast of Ambulong. Whilst there were no casualties from this attack, the ship was severely damaged. That night, she ran aground on a reef near Pabugan Point, and could not be moved. Ultimately, the decision was made to abandon ship, and the crew all arrived ashore on Ambulong by 3:30am on the 31st. The ship remained on the reef for a few months, having been deemed a constructive total loss, but she was refloated around 24 February 1945, and salvage operations were still ongoing in March 1945. Eventually, the ship was repaired, and she entered United States Navy service under bareboat charter from WSA as USS Araner (IX-226) on 23 September 1945, and placed in service that same day.

Araner appears to have contributed very little service to the United States Navy. She was inspected by an inspection and survey board at Leyte during October, the month following the beginning of her naval service. In January 1946, probably as a result of that inspection, she received orders to be towed to Subic Bay where all her naval gear was stripped pending her deactivation. On 22 August 1946, she was placed out of service at Subic Bay and simultaneously turned over to the Maritime Commission's War Shipping Administration for disposal. That organization finally sold her along with fourteen other vessels to the Asia Development Corporation, Shanghai on 29 January 1948 for scrapping. Her name was struck from the Navy list on 29 October 1948.

== Sources ==
- "Official Chronology of the US Navy in WWII". Ibiblio.
