= Ilin Island =

Island in the Philippines

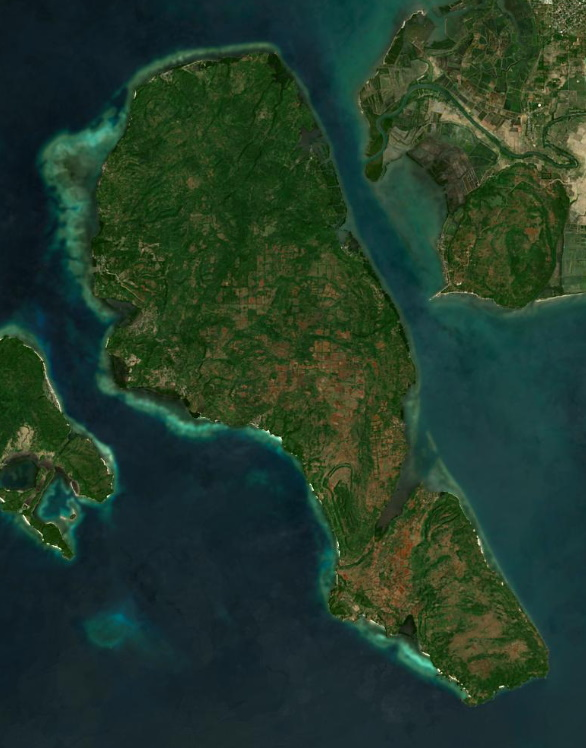
- Ilin Island satellite image

- Location within Luzon Location within Philippines

Geography
- Coordinates: 12°13′N 121°05′E
- Adjacent to: Mindoro Strait; Sulu Sea
- Area: 47 km^{2} (18 sq mi)

Administration
- Philippines
- Region: Mimaropa
- Province: Occidental Mindoro
- Municipality: San Jose

Demographics
- Population: 11,926 (2020)
- Pop. density: 254/km^{2} (658/sq mi)

Ilin Island is a small island in the Philippines. Measuring 47 square kilometres (18 sq mi), it is just south of Mindoro, separated by the Ilin Strait and Mangarin Bay. To the west is the smaller Ambulong Island, across the Ambulong Strait.

Politically, the island is part of San Jose, Occidental Mindoro, and is divided into ten barangays, namely: Ansiray, Bankal (Bangkal), Buri, Catayungan, Ilin (Iling Proper), Inasakan, Ipil, Labangan Ilin, Natandol and Pawican. As of the 2015 census, its population is 12,017 persons, up from 10,296 in the 2010 census.

The island is home to the Ilin Island cloudrunner, an endangered species of cloud rat.

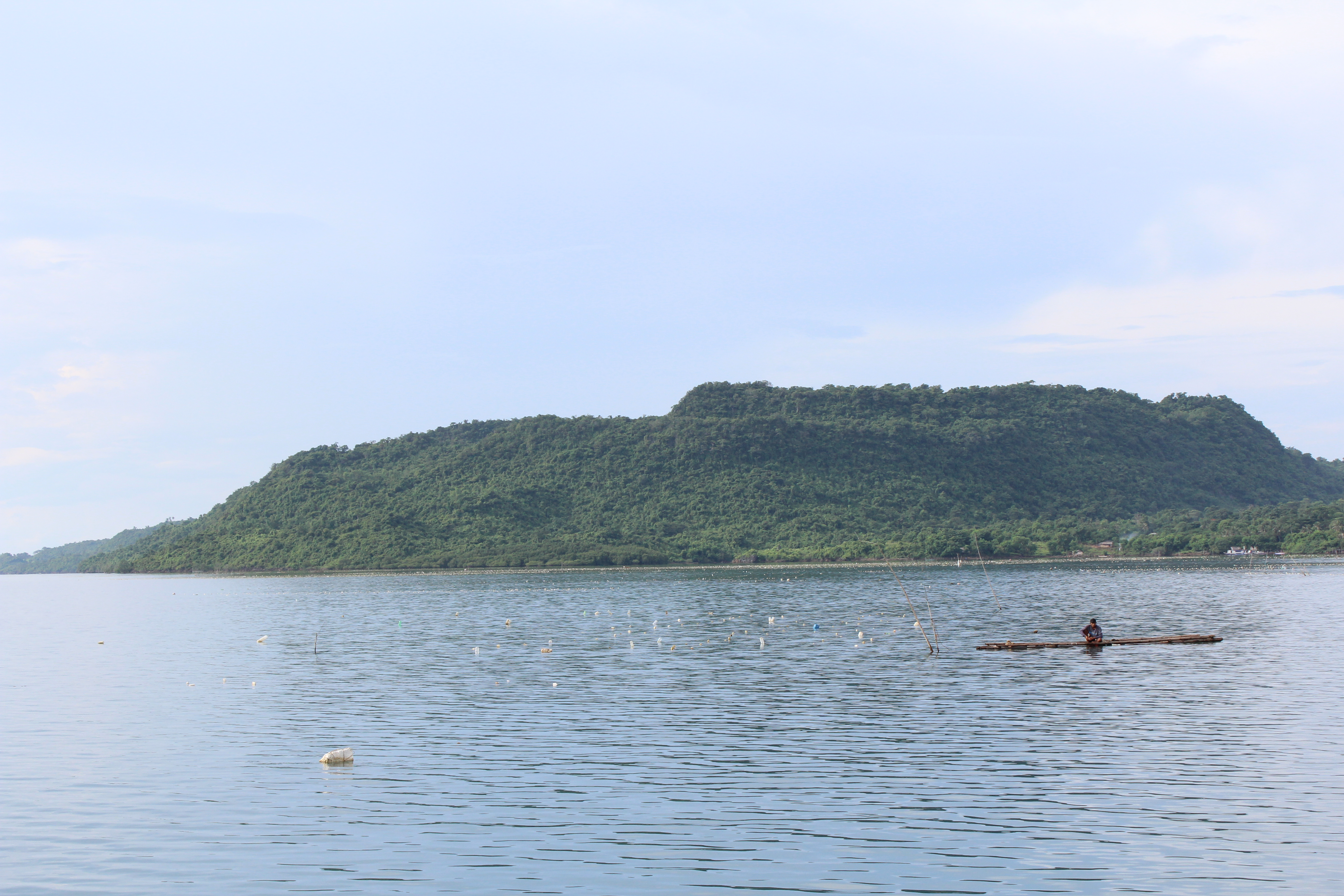
View of Ilin Island at Natandol, San Jose, Occidental Mindoro
