= Port of San Jose, Occidental Mindoro =

Port of San Jose, Occidental Mindoro Pantalan ng San Jose, Occidental Mindoro
- Click on the map for a fullscreen view

Location
- Country: Philippines
- Location: San Jose, Occidental Mindoro
- Coordinates: 12°19′55″N 121°05′10″E
- UN/LOCODE: PHSJI

Details
- Operated by: Philippine Ports Authority
- Size: 14,074.20 square metres (151,493.4 sq ft)

Statistics
- Website http://www.pdosoluz.com.ph/

The Port of San Jose, Occidental Mindoro (Filipino: Pantalan ng San Jose, Occidental Mindoro) also known as the Caminawit Port is a seaport in San Jose, Occidental Mindoro in the Philippines. It was the main seaport of Occidental Mindoro. Both shipping cargo and ferrying passengers have been suspended by the port authority due to heavy siltation.

The port has at least two piers, with the old pier measuring 60 metres (200 ft) long and 15 metres (49 ft) which are made from wood and a new pier measuring 74 metres (243 ft) long and 32 metres (105 ft) wide ramp at the offshore end and a 32 metres (105 ft) beth at the west side of the pier. The concrete pier is connected to 60 metres (200 ft) concrete ramp. An asphalt paved open storage area measuring 1,612 square metres (17,350 sq ft) and a multi-purpose building with 225 square metres (2,420 sq ft) covered storage area, and an additional 300 square metres (3,200 sq ft) is allotted for the passenger terminal with amenities and parking area.
