= San Jose, Occidental Mindoro =

Municipality in Occidental Mindoro, Philippines

San Jose
- Municipality
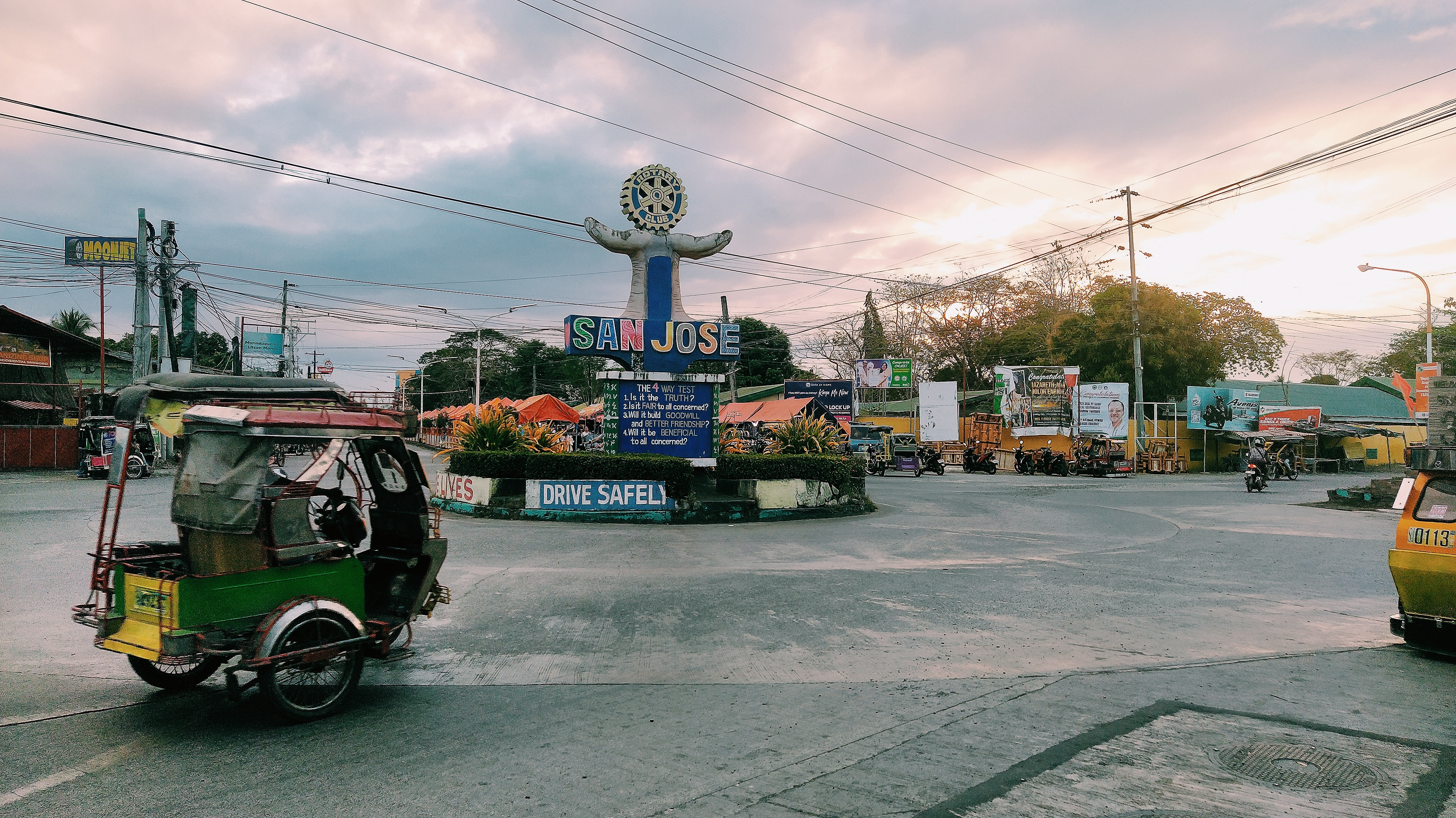
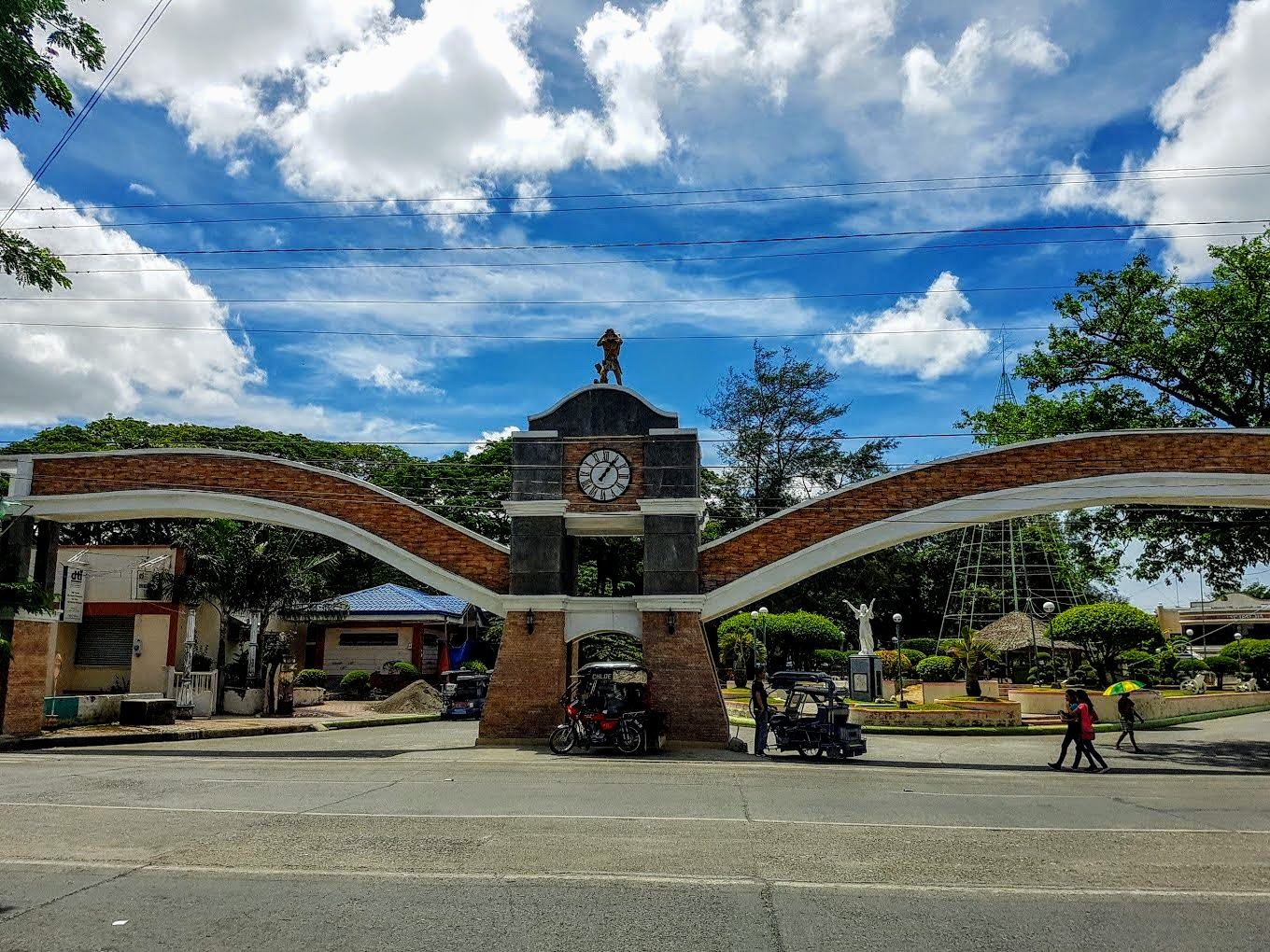
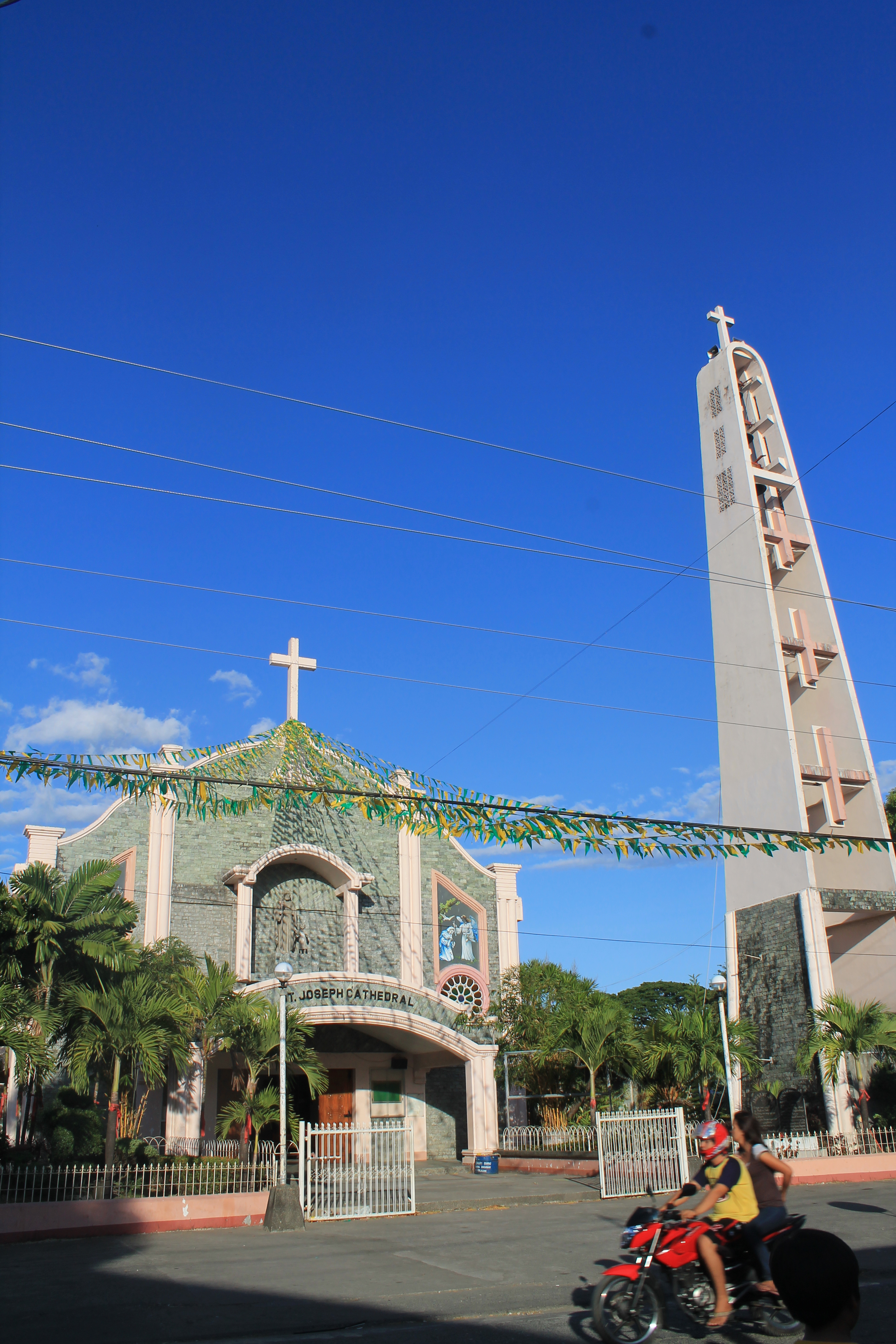
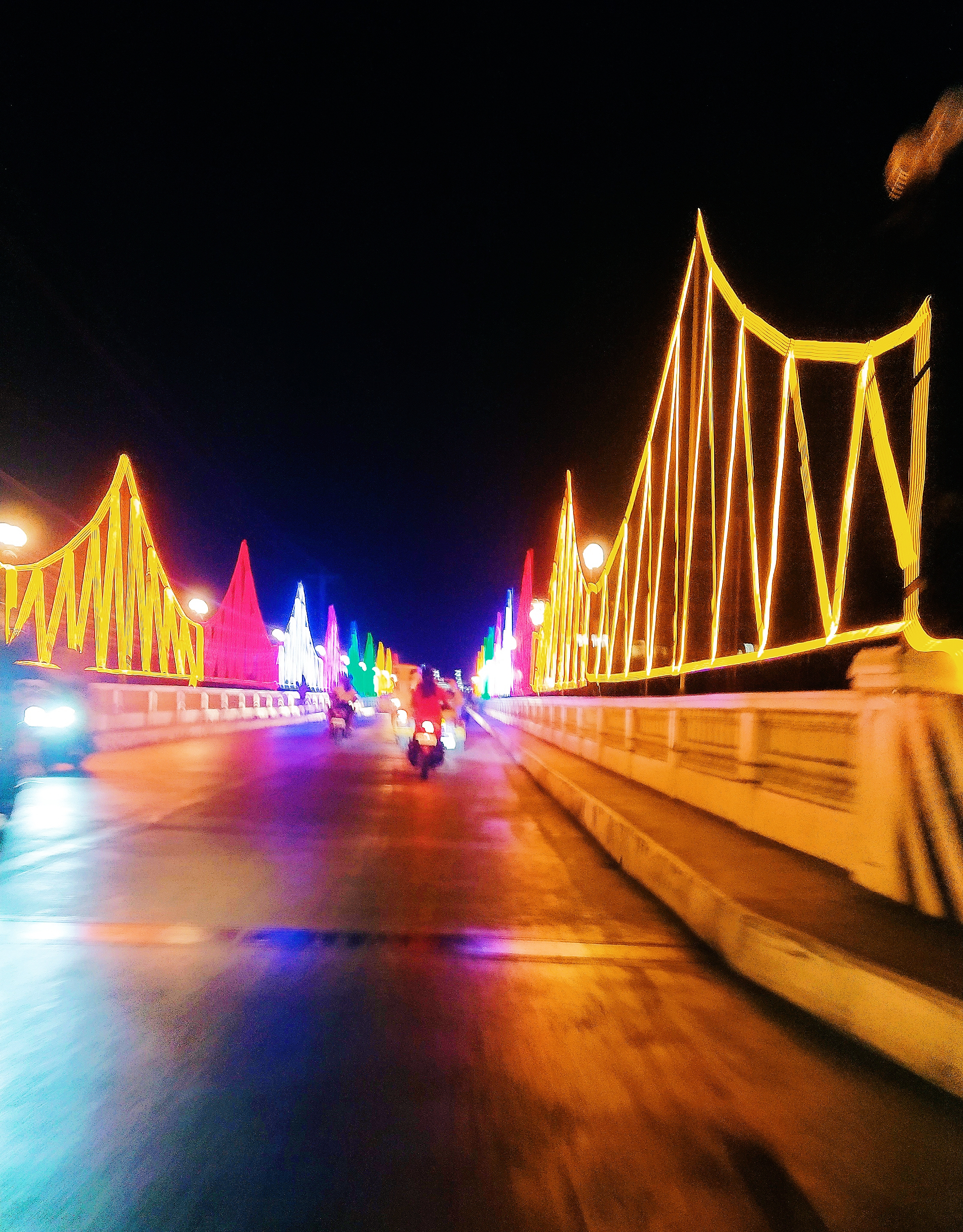
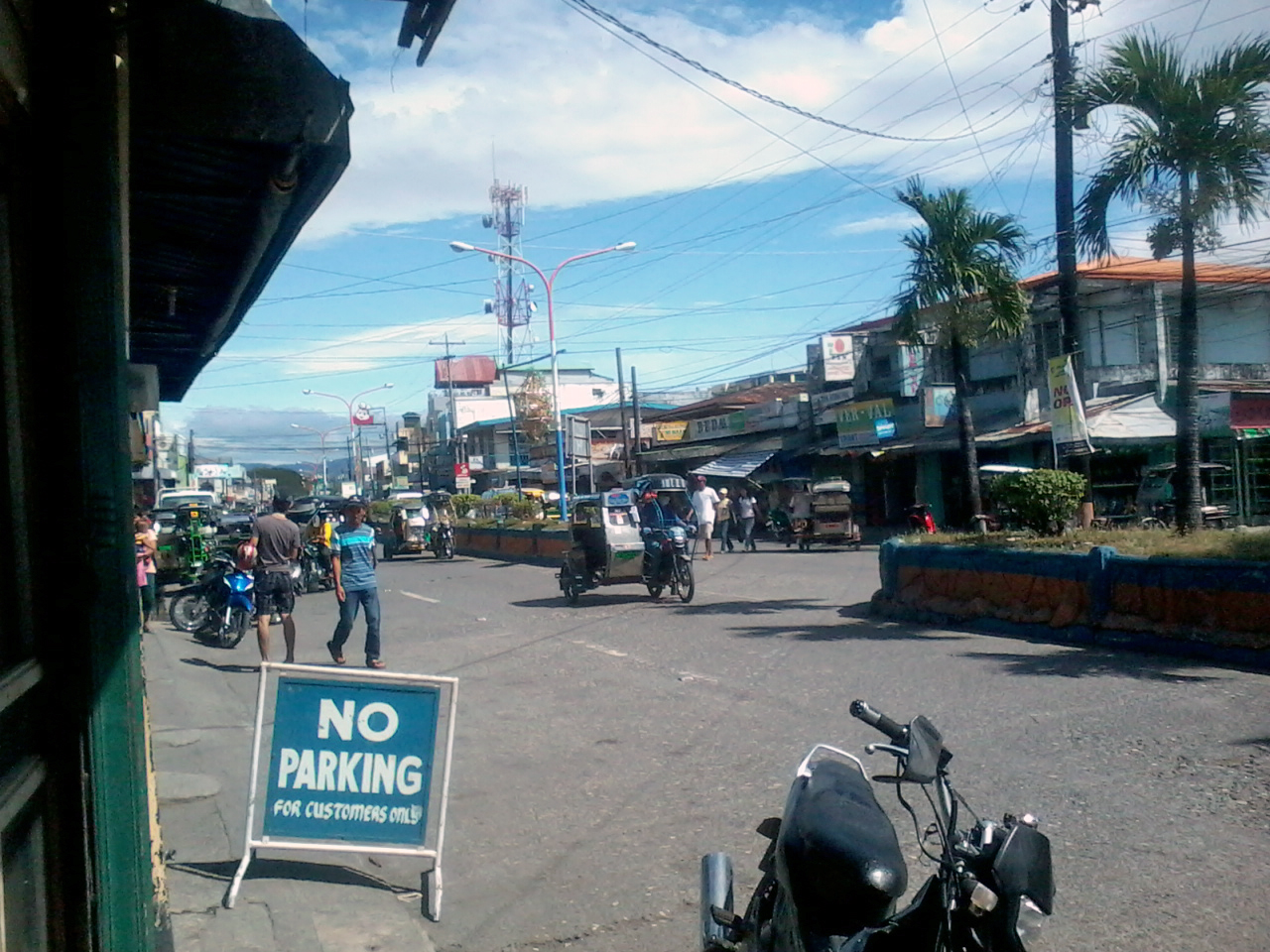
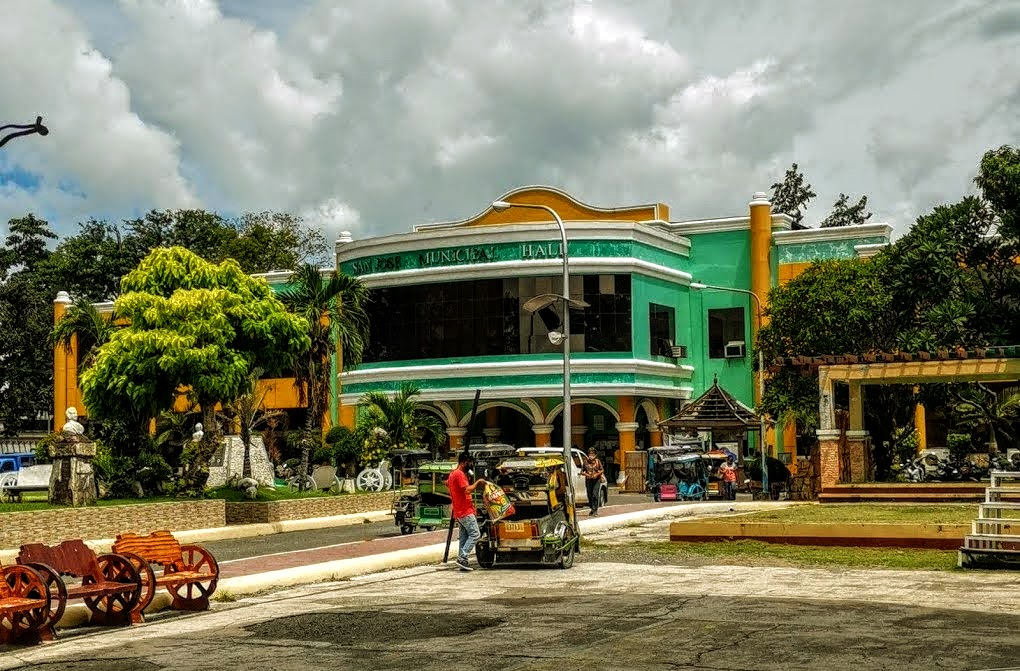
- San Jose Roundabout Municipal plaza welcome arch and clock tower St. Joseph the Worker Cathedral Pandurucan Bridge Downtown Rizal Street facing east San Jose Municipal Townhall

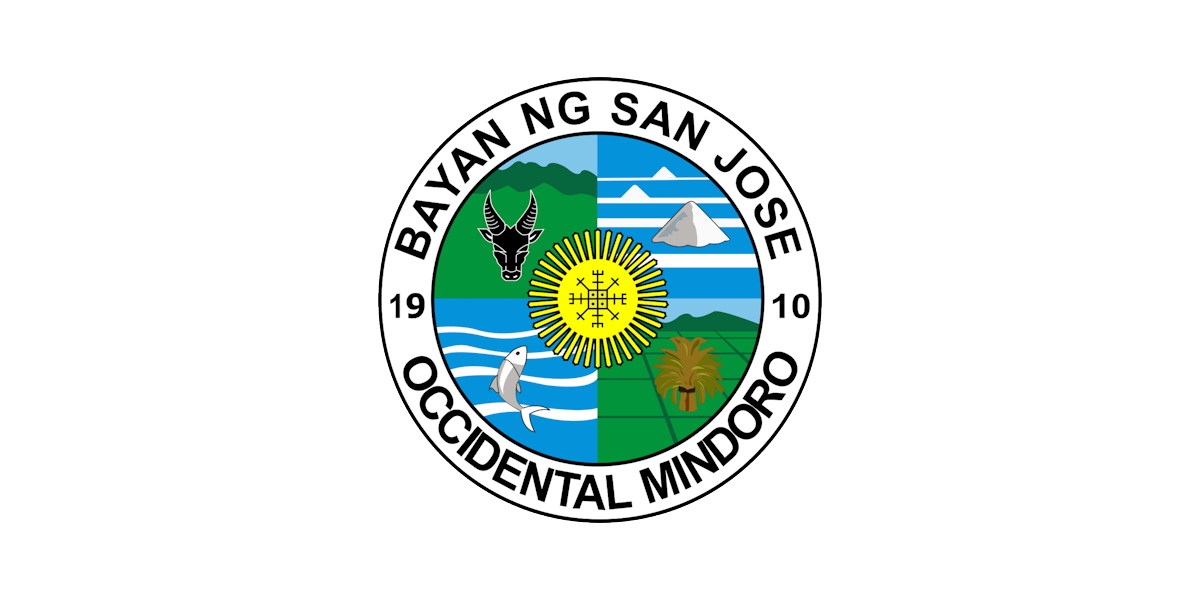
- Flag Seal

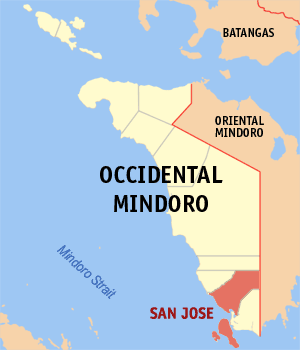
- Map of Occidental Mindoro with San Jose highlighted
- Interactive map of San Jose
- Location within the Philippines
- Coordinates: 12°21′10″N 121°04′03″E
- Country: Philippines
- Region: Mimaropa
- Province: Occidental Mindoro
- District: Lone district
- Founded: May 01, 1910
- Named for: Saint Joseph
- Barangays: 39 (see Barangays)

Government
  - Type: Sangguniang Bayan
  - Mayor: Rey Ladaga
  - Vice Mayor: Santiago "Sonny" Javier
  - Representative: Leody "Odie" Tarriela
  - Governor: Eduardo Gadiano
  - Vice Governor: Diana Apigo Tayag
  - Municipal Council: Members: Santiago Javier Jr.; Dionisio Malilay Jr.; Joel Aguilar; Nathaniel Garcia; Myrna Zapanta; Harry Gilbert Chua; Arneldo Argame; Mercy Alvaran

Area
  - Total: 446.70 km^{2} (172.47 sq mi)
- Elevation: 3.0 m (9.8 ft)
- Highest elevation: 32 m (105 ft)
- Lowest elevation: 0 m (0 ft)

Population (2024 census)
  - Total: 143,495
  - Rank: 21st
  - Density: 321.23/km^{2} (831.99/sq mi)
  - Households: 37,331

Economy
  - Income class: 1st municipal income class
  - Poverty incidence: 16.64% (2023)
  - Revenue: ₱ 802.2 million (2024)
  - Assets: ₱ 1,972 million (2024)
  - Expenditure: ₱ 838.3 million (2024)
  - Liabilities: ₱ 563.7 million (2024)

Service provider
  - Electricity: Occidental Mindoro Electric Cooperative (OMECO)
- Time zone: UTC+8 (PST)
- ZIP code: 5100
- PSGC: 1705110000
- IDD : area code: +63 (0)43
- Native languages: Buhid; Hanunó'o; Ratagnon; Tagalog

San Jose, officially the Municipality of San Jose (Tagalog: Bayan ng San Jose), is a municipality in the province of Occidental Mindoro, Philippines. According to the 2024 census, it has a population of 143,495 people.

San Jose has the province's largest commercial port and airport, the most banking, business, dining and commercial establishments in Occidental Mindoro, and has become a center of trade in the Mimaropa region. Its major local and international exports include rice, salt and processed milkfish. It was ranked 13th in "overall competitiveness" among Philippine local government units in the 2017 Cities and Municipalities Competitiveness Index (CMCI).

In pre-colonial times, it was named Pandurucan by the indigenous Mangyans after the local river, before later renamed for its patron saint, St. Joseph, the husband of Mary.

== History ==
Historical records show that in the 14th century, Chinese traders anchored to trade at the shores of Mangarin, the oldest settlement in the southern portion of Occidental Mindoro. Its name was derived from the word “Mandarin”, an official Chinese Palace, the remains of which can still be found in the old barrio of Mangarin. The area was once a Sinified Buddhist state called Ma-i before the Sultanate of Brunei invaded. When the Spanish took possession of the Island in the 18th century, the first site of the Presidencia was built in sitio of Sinaoga, on the western side of Barrio Santa Teresa, now part of the municipality of Magsaysay. A year later, it was again transferred to Caminawit.

Archaeological evidence from caves and rockshelter sites in the island of Ilin indicate human habitation dating back thousands of years (Middle Holocene period, about 6,000 years ago).

=== Early 20th century ===
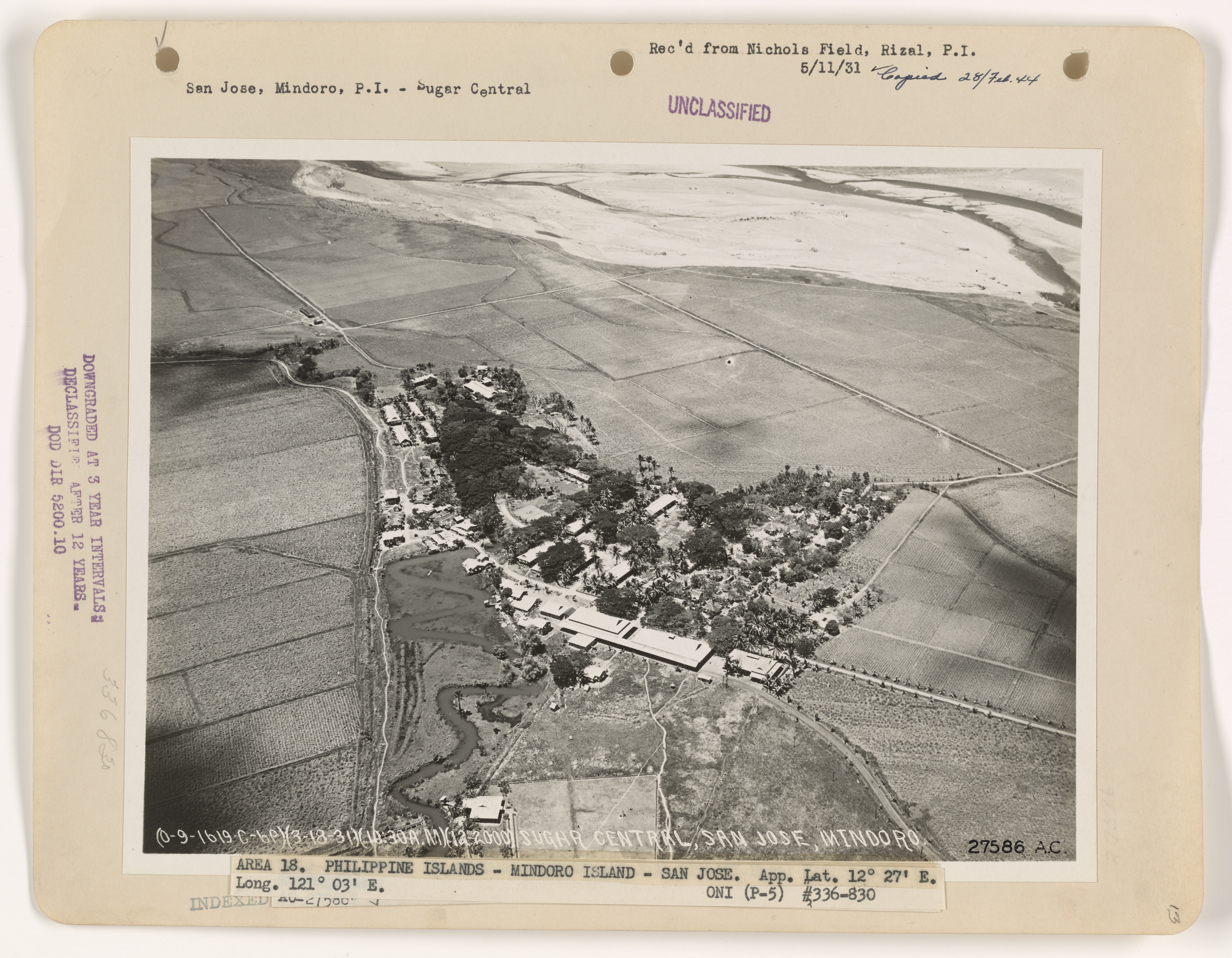
Aerial view of San Jose, 1931

On May 1, 1910, Pandurucan, which was renamed San Jose, became the seat of the Civil Government with Don German Ramirez as its first appointed leader up to 1915. When the Japanese Imperial Forces occupied the town, Bonifacio Gomez was appointed as Mayor from 1941 to 1942, followed by Pedro Cuden, 1942–1943 and finally Isabelo Abeleda, in 1944 until 1946. During the American reoccupation Bibiano Gaudiel replaced Isabelo Abeleda who regained his position in 1955.

=== World War II ===
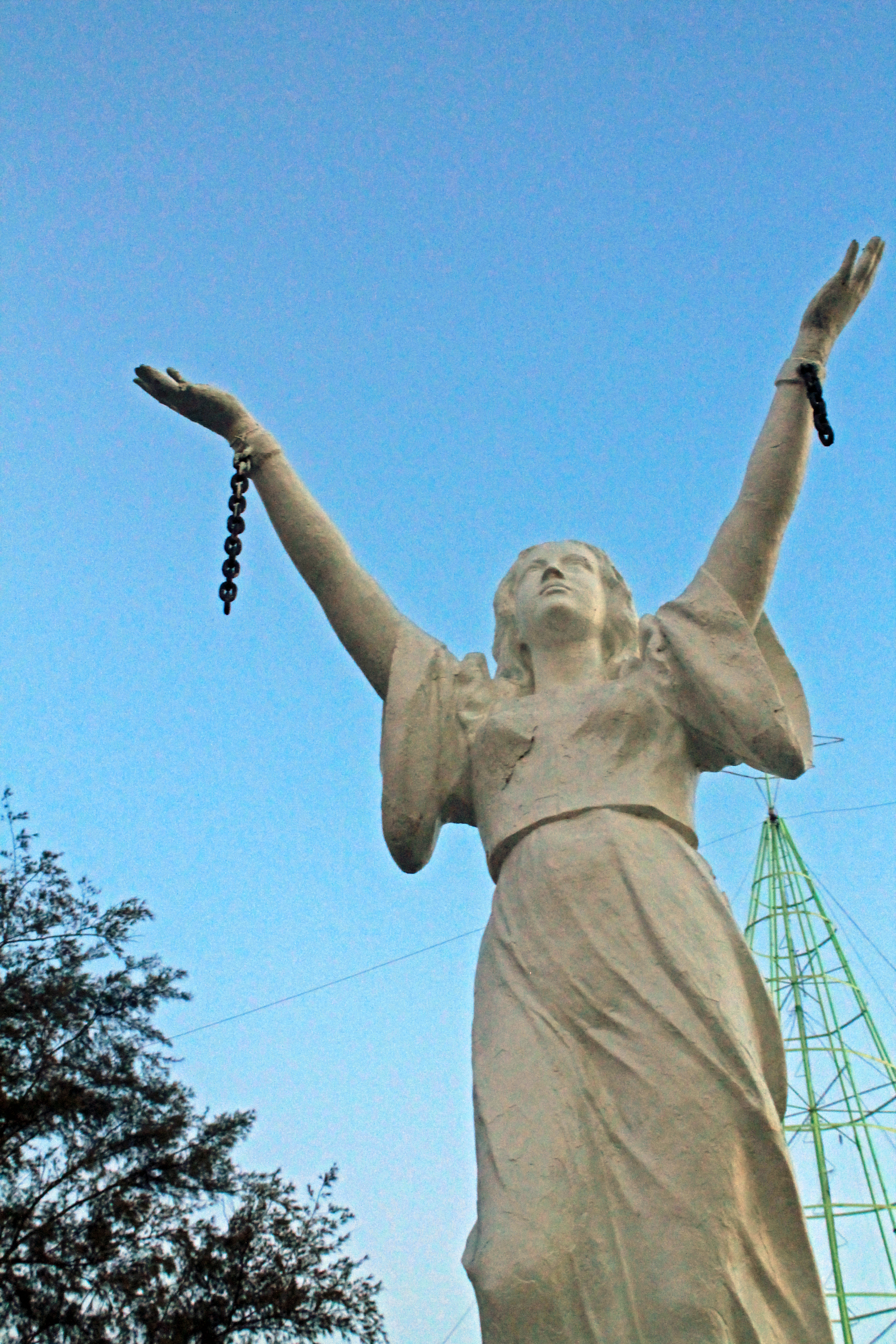
The Liberation Monument in the municipal park commemorating the Filipinos who fought against the Japanese forces in the Second World War

San Jose figures prominently in Philippine history for its role during World War II. American naval forces led by General Douglas MacArthur staged a so-called "Second Landing" in the beaches of San Jose (the "First" being the famous Leyte Landing) on December 15, 1944, to retake the Philippine islands from the Japanese (the Battle of Mindoro). Securing San Jose and the whole Mindoro island proved decisive in the goal to recapture Manila and Luzon, and the eventual defeat of the Japanese Imperial forces by Filipino and American troops.

=== Contemporary history ===
In 1950, the Philippine government split Mindoro into two provinces, Occidental Mindoro and Oriental Mindoro. San Jose became the temporary capital until it was later transferred to Mamburao. With encouragement from the national government, migration into Mindoro in the years after World War II boosted population growth and spurred development. The Philippine Sugar Mill plantation in the northern Barangay Central helped San Jose become the center of commerce in those years.

On April 3, 1969, the barrios of Alibog, Caguray, Calawag, Gapasan, Laste, Lourdes, Nicolas, Paclolo, Purnaga, Sibalat, and Santa Teresa was separated from San Jose to create a separate municipality known as Magsaysay.

During the 1970s, development has since shifted to what is now the poblacion area and neighboring barangays. The economic base also has widened to include rice, corn, tobacco, salt, and aquaculture production geared towards both the local Philippine and international markets.

=== Conversion into a city ===
The Municipality of San Jose passed Resolution No. 0023 in 2001, seeking conversion to city status. In 2016, Congresswoman Josephine Ramirez-Sato filed House Bill No. 2164 which aims to convert San Jose into a component city. To date, this resolution has not been acted upon or pursued by Congress of the Philippines.

== Geography ==
San Jose is 173 kilometres (107 mi) from Mamburao and 229 kilometres (142 mi) from Calapan. It is located at the southern part of the province with a total land area of 44,670 hectares (110,400 acres). San Jose is bordered on the north by the municipalities of Rizal and Calintaan, on the east by the municipalities of Mansalay and Bulalacao, on the south by the municipality of Magsaysay, and on the west by the Mindoro Strait. Its jurisdiction includes Ambulong and Ilin Islands.

Climatic condition is classified under Type A category and slope is generally flat. Soil composition developed from recent alluvial deposits which are silty-loam to clay loam and landforms consist of limestone and sedimentary rocks. All types of erosion are present: slight, moderate and severe erosion. Eleven (11) rivers and creeks, including the Pandurucan River which runs through the center of town, serve as natural drainage. Mineral deposits includes copper and limestone.

=== Barangays ===
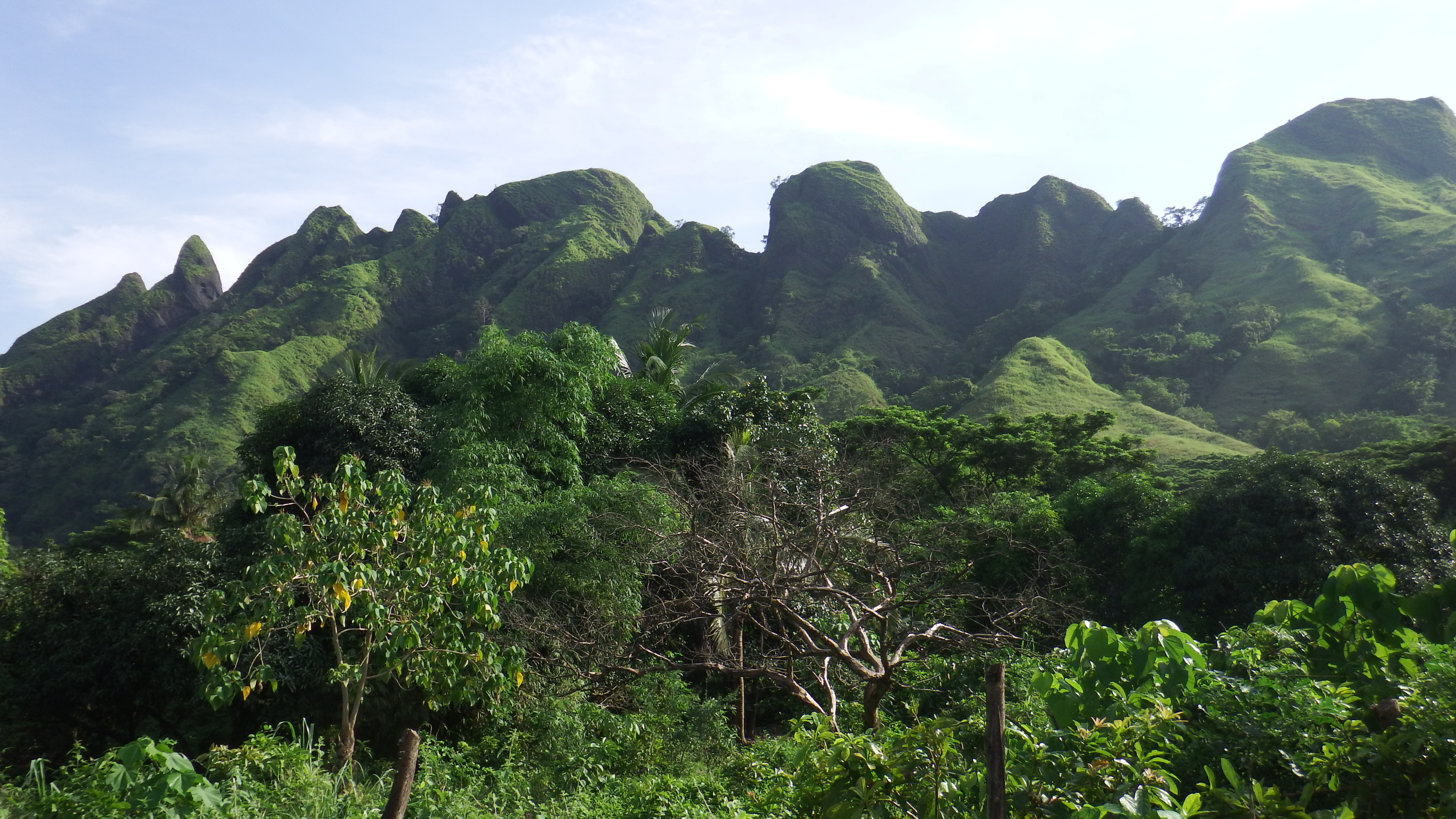
Angels Mountains

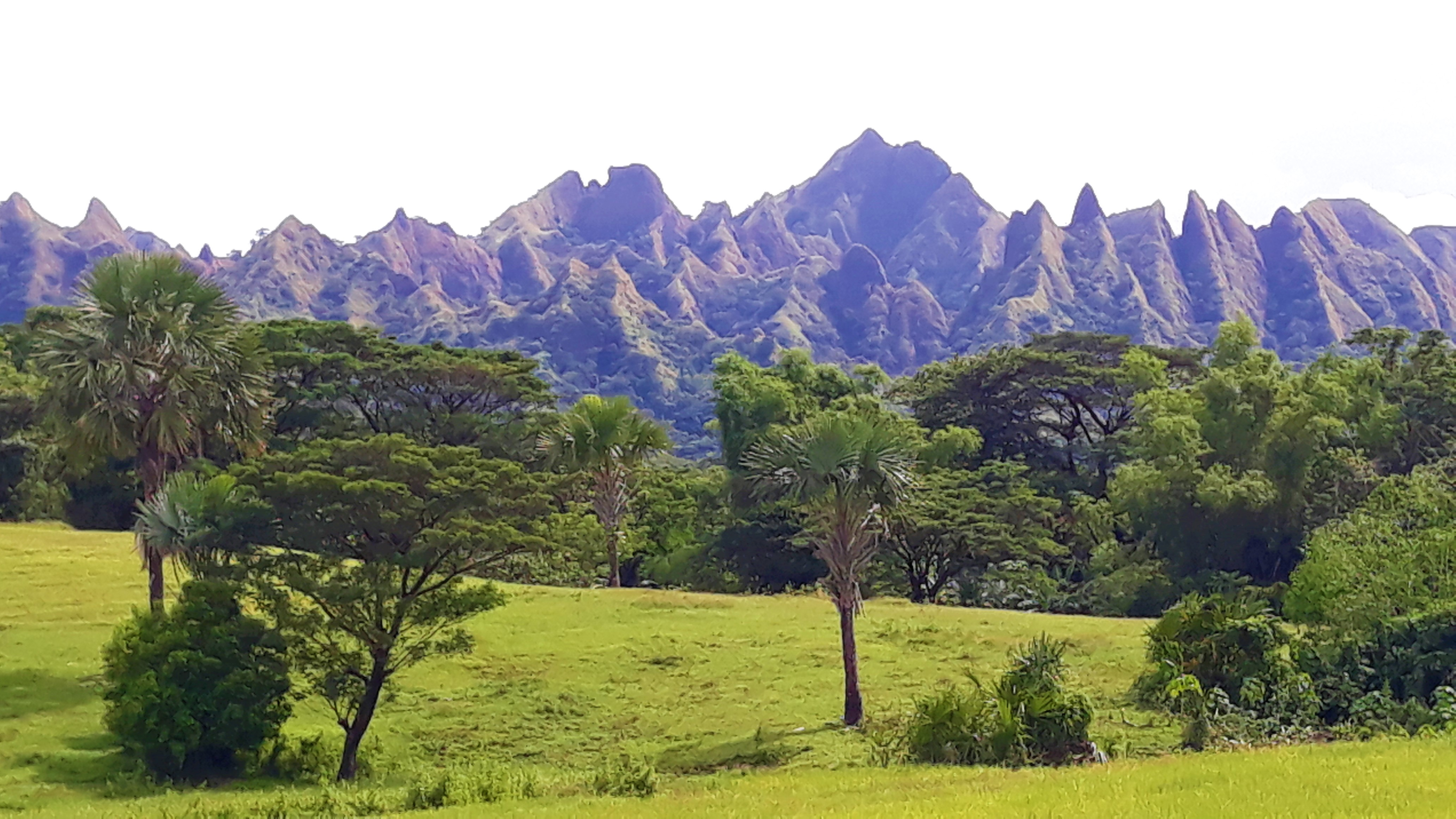
Devils Mountains

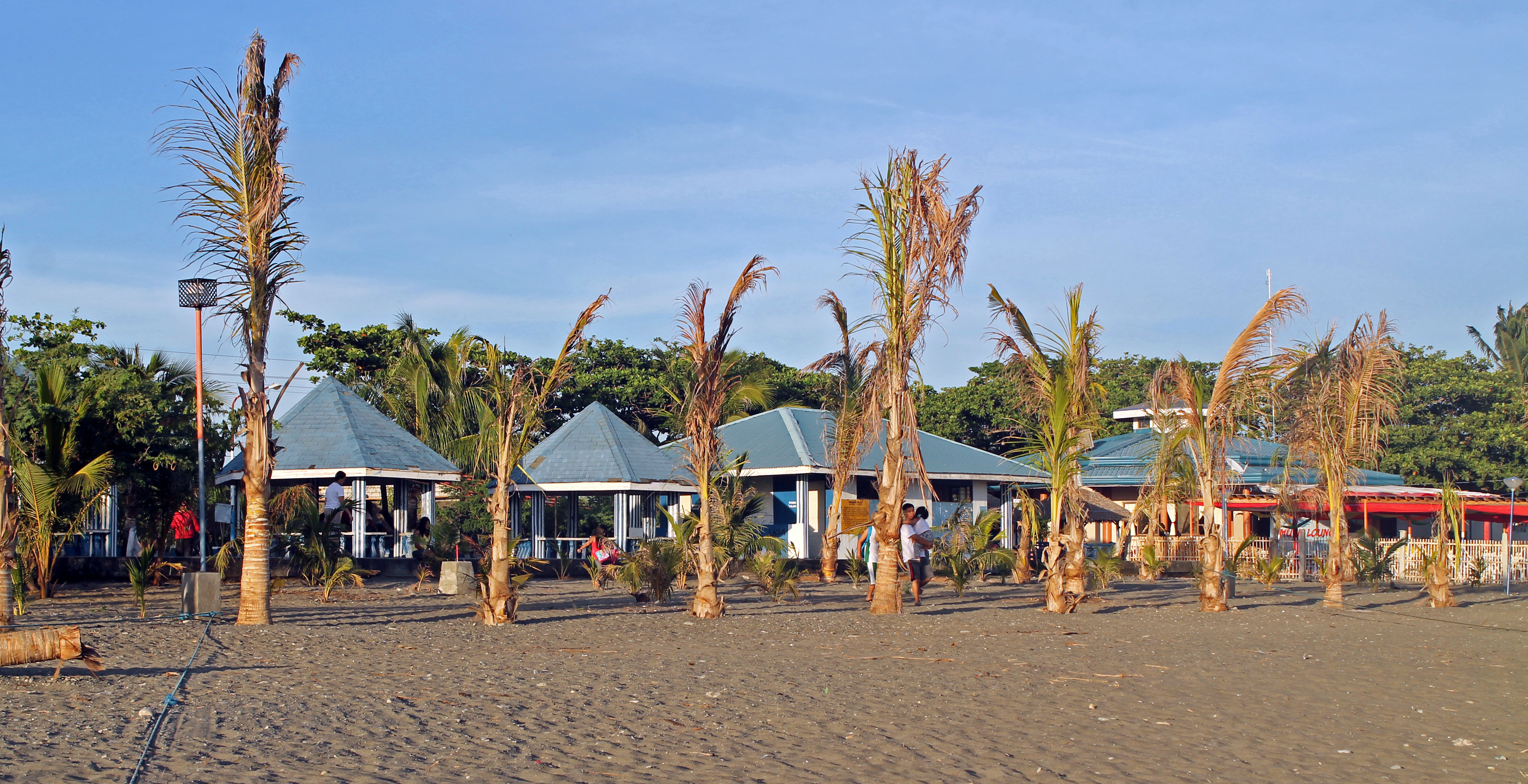
Aroma Beach in April 2013

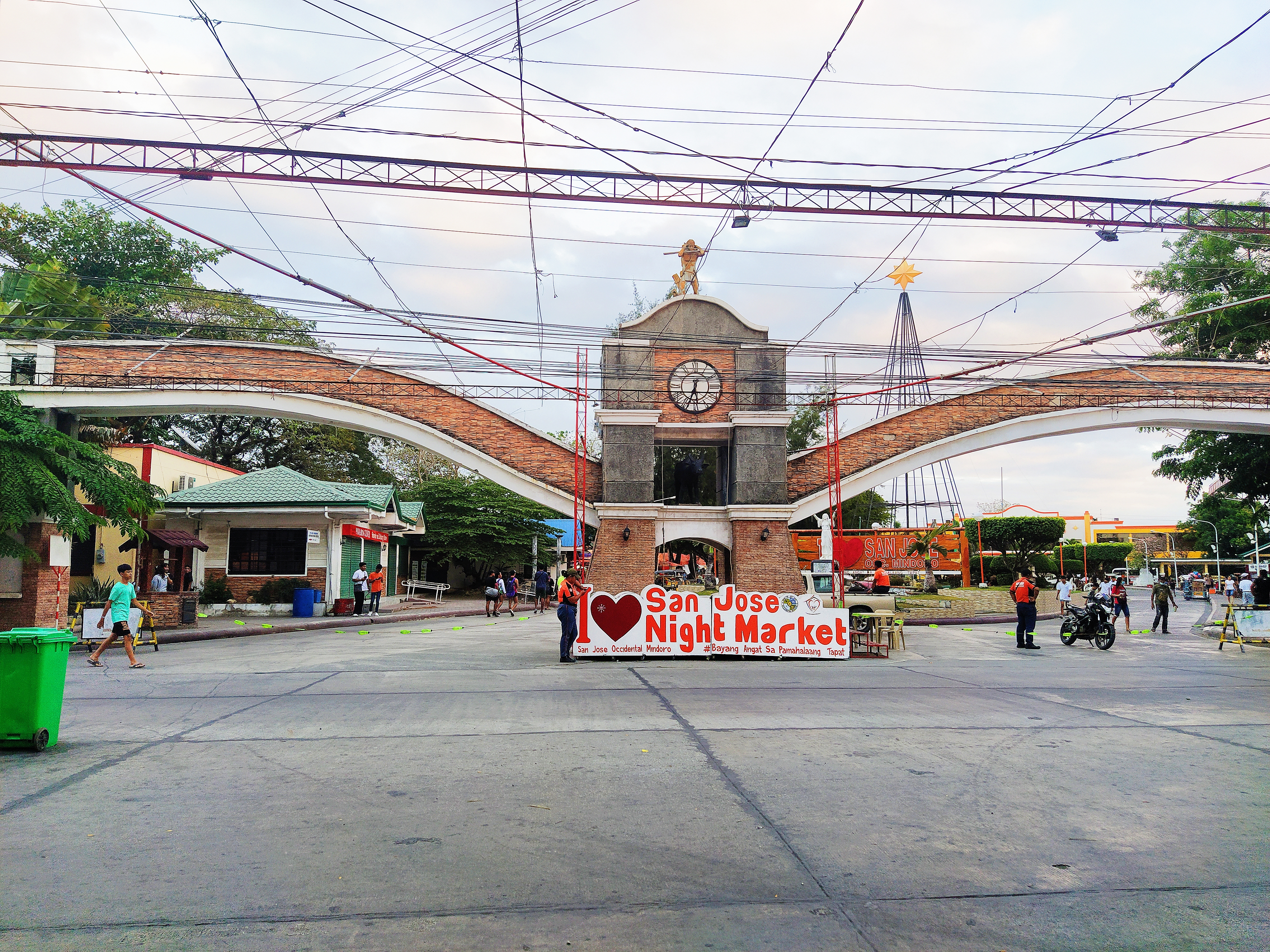
Municipal plaza during a night market in February 2024

Urban map of the Municipality of San Jose

San Jose is politically subdivided into 39 barangays. Each barangay consists of puroks and some have sitios.

Barangay Naibuan (PSGC 175110040) was created by virtue of Presidential Memorandum Order No. 19, series of 2018, pursuant to Sangguniang Panlalawigan Resolution No. 138, series of 2007 and ratified through a plebiscite on January 5, 2018.

PSGC	Barangay	Population			±% p.a.	
		2024		2010		
175110001	Ambulong	1.5%	2,224	1,539	▴	2.57%
175110002	Ansiray	0.7%	1,032	945	▴	0.61%
175110003	Bagong Sikat	4.6%	6,564	6,096	▴	0.51%
175110004	Bangkal	0.7%	933	799	▴	1.07%
175110005	Barangay 1 (Poblacion)	0.2%	283	265	▴	0.45%
175110006	Barangay 2 (Poblacion)	0.3%	415	391	▴	0.41%
175110007	Barangay 3 (Poblacion)	0.9%	1,323	1,113	▴	1.20%
175110008	Barangay 4 (Poblacion)	0.3%	500	473	▴	0.38%
175110009	Barangay 5 (Poblacion)	1.1%	1,569	1,524	▴	0.20%
175110010	Barangay 6 (Poblacion)	0.3%	398	450	▾	−0.84%
175110011	Barangay 7 (Poblacion)	0.3%	436	437	▾	−0.02%
175110012	Barangay 8 (Poblacion)	0.2%	348	343	▴	0.10%
175110013	Batasan	4.4%	6,260	4,851	▴	1.77%
175110014	Bayotbot	1.7%	2,492	2,081	▴	1.25%
175110015	Bubog	6.5%	9,356	8,134	▴	0.97%
175110016	Buri	0.4%	607	484	▴	1.57%
175110017	Camburay	1.3%	1,849	1,856	▾	−0.03%
175110018	Caminawit	8.5%	12,223	10,564	▴	1.01%
175110019	Catayungan	0.7%	1,021	794	▴	1.75%
175110020	Central	7.6%	10,901	9,250	▴	1.14%
175110021	Iling Proper	1.5%	2,124	1,886	▴	0.82%
175110022	Inasakan	0.4%	625	581	▴	0.50%
175110023	Ipil	0.5%	789	587	▴	2.06%
175110024	La Curva	2.1%	3,034	3,270	▾	−0.51%
175110025	Labangan Iling	0.7%	1,070	1,009	▴	0.41%
175110026	Labangan Poblacion	6.7%	9,683	8,872	▴	0.60%
175110027	Mabini	2.0%	2,938	2,584	▴	0.89%
175110028	Magbay	3.0%	4,299	3,651	▴	1.13%
175110029	Mangarin	2.4%	3,410	3,049	▴	0.77%
175110030	Mapaya	5.6%	7,982	7,349	▴	0.57%
175110031	Murtha	4.2%	5,985	5,279	▴	0.87%
175110032	Monte Claro	2.7%	3,855	3,506	▴	0.66%
175110033	Natandol	1.1%	1,521	1,062	▴	2.51%
175110034	Pag-asa	7.8%	11,232	12,701	▾	−0.84%
175110035	Pawican	1.6%	2,295	2,149	▴	0.45%
175110037	San Agustin	3.7%	5,363	5,301	▴	0.08%
175110038	San Isidro	1.2%	1,785	1,844	▾	−0.22%
175110039	San Roque	10.2%	14,706	14,119	▴	0.28%
	Total		143,495	131,188	▴	0.62%

=== Climate ===
Climate data for San Jose, Occidental Mindoro (1991–2020, extremes 1980–present)
Month	Jan	Feb	Mar	Apr	May	Jun	Jul	Aug	Sep	Oct	Nov	Dec	Year
Record high °C (°F)	36.0 (96.8)	36.8 (98.2)	38.3 (100.9)	39.2 (102.6)	38.8 (101.8)	38.0 (100.4)	39.2 (102.6)	37.4 (99.3)	35.6 (96.1)	36.0 (96.8)	38.0 (100.4)	36.6 (97.9)	39.2 (102.6)
Mean daily maximum °C (°F)	32.5 (90.5)	33.0 (91.4)	34.0 (93.2)	34.9 (94.8)	34.1 (93.4)	32.5 (90.5)	31.0 (87.8)	31.0 (87.8)	30.9 (87.6)	31.7 (89.1)	32.8 (91.0)	32.6 (90.7)	32.6 (90.7)
Daily mean °C (°F)	27.2 (81.0)	27.9 (82.2)	28.9 (84.0)	29.6 (85.3)	29.4 (84.9)	28.4 (83.1)	27.5 (81.5)	27.5 (81.5)	27.3 (81.1)	27.7 (81.9)	28.2 (82.8)	28.1 (82.6)	28.1 (82.6)
Mean daily minimum °C (°F)	21.9 (71.4)	22.9 (73.2)	23.8 (74.8)	24.3 (75.7)	24.6 (76.3)	24.4 (75.9)	23.9 (75.0)	23.9 (75.0)	23.8 (74.8)	23.6 (74.5)	23.7 (74.7)	23.6 (74.5)	23.7 (74.7)
Record low °C (°F)	15.5 (59.9)	15.4 (59.7)	18.5 (65.3)	18.8 (65.8)	20.5 (68.9)	18.0 (64.4)	20.0 (68.0)	18.0 (64.4)	19.0 (66.2)	19.0 (66.2)	18.8 (65.8)	17.5 (63.5)	15.4 (59.7)
Average rainfall mm (inches)	13.0 (0.51)	11.8 (0.46)	11.8 (0.46)	31.6 (1.24)	166.4 (6.55)	325.5 (12.81)	507.3 (19.97)	469.0 (18.46)	436.1 (17.17)	244.0 (9.61)	97.4 (3.83)	74.8 (2.94)	2,388.7 (94.04)
Average rainy days (≥ 1.0 mm)	3	2	2	3	9	15	20	20	18	13	7	5	117
Average relative humidity (%)	73	72	71	72	78	84	87	88	89	86	79	76	80
Source: PAGASA

San Jose has a tropical monsoon climate (Köppen climate classification Am). The average annual temperature is 27.5 °C. The warmest month of the year is May, with an average temperature of 28.9 °C. January has the lowest average temperature of the year, at 26.5 °C. The average annual rainfall is 3126 mm. The driest month is March, with 8 mm of rainfall. With an average of 714 mm, the most precipitation falls in July.

== Demographics ==
Population census of San Jose
Year	Pop.	±% p.a.
1903	1,764	—
1918	7,703	+10.33%
1939	11,788	+2.05%
1948	12,443	+0.60%
1960	36,211	+9.31%
1970	44,761	+2.14%
1975	53,100	+3.49%
1980	66,262	+4.53%
1990	87,520	+2.82%
1995	101,411	+2.80%
2000	111,009	+1.96%
2007	118,807	+0.94%
2010	131,188	+3.67%
2015	143,430	+1.71%
2020	153,267	+1.41%
2024	143,495	−1.57%
Source: Philippine Statistics Authority

San Jose is the most densely populated area in the province of Occidental Mindoro, with a 2.38% annual growth. Out of the total population of 143,430 people, about 42% reside in urban area while 58% are situated in rural barangays. The majority of the population consists of a mix of migrants of different ethnolinguistic groups from nearby provinces, namely: Tagalogs, Bicolanos, Visayans, Kapampangans, Pangasinans and Ilocanos. Some 2% of its population belong to the indigenous Mangyan peoples, primarily the Hanunuo and Buhid tribes.

Average household size is recorded at 5 with an urban density of 6500 persons per km^{2}. About 69% are dependents, resulting to a dependency ratio of 1:2. On the other hand, male-female ratio is computed at 108:100.

=== Language ===
Tagalog is the most spoken dialect of San Jose.

=== Religion ===
83.97% are practicing Roman Catholicism, pastorally served since 1983 by the Roman Catholic Apostolic Vicariate of San Jose in Mindoro, with its own titular church, the St. Joseph the Worker Cathedral.

=== Tourism ===
The town celebrates an annual festival called Pandurucan Festival every May 1 that includes preceding events like Indak Pandurucan, a street-dancing competition held every April 29, and culminates in lantern parade and concert activities at the municipal plaza; the festivity is the only festival in the province that is accredited by the tourism department.

== Economy ==
Poverty incidence of San Jose (%)

Source: Philippine Statistics Authority

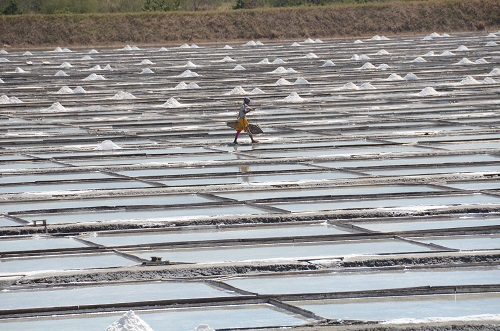
Salt farm in San Jose.

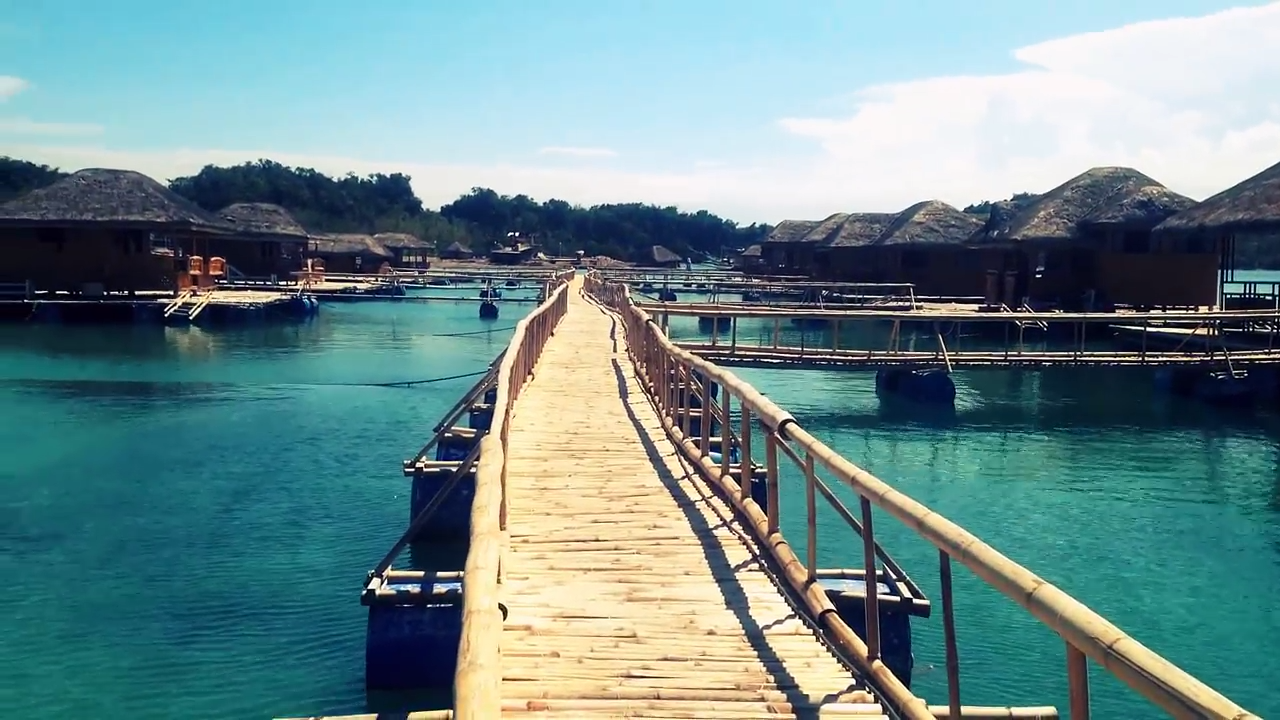
A beach resort in San Jose in Ambulong island which is located south from the town center.

The municipality has diverse economic activities. However, the majority of the working force which is estimated at 76%, are still engaged in agriculture. Like the rest of the province, other industries in San Jose are tied to the town's agricultural base. A substantial majority of palay and rice of Occidental Mindoro, a major supplier of rice for Manila and elsewhere, are delivered, milled, traded and sold in San Jose.

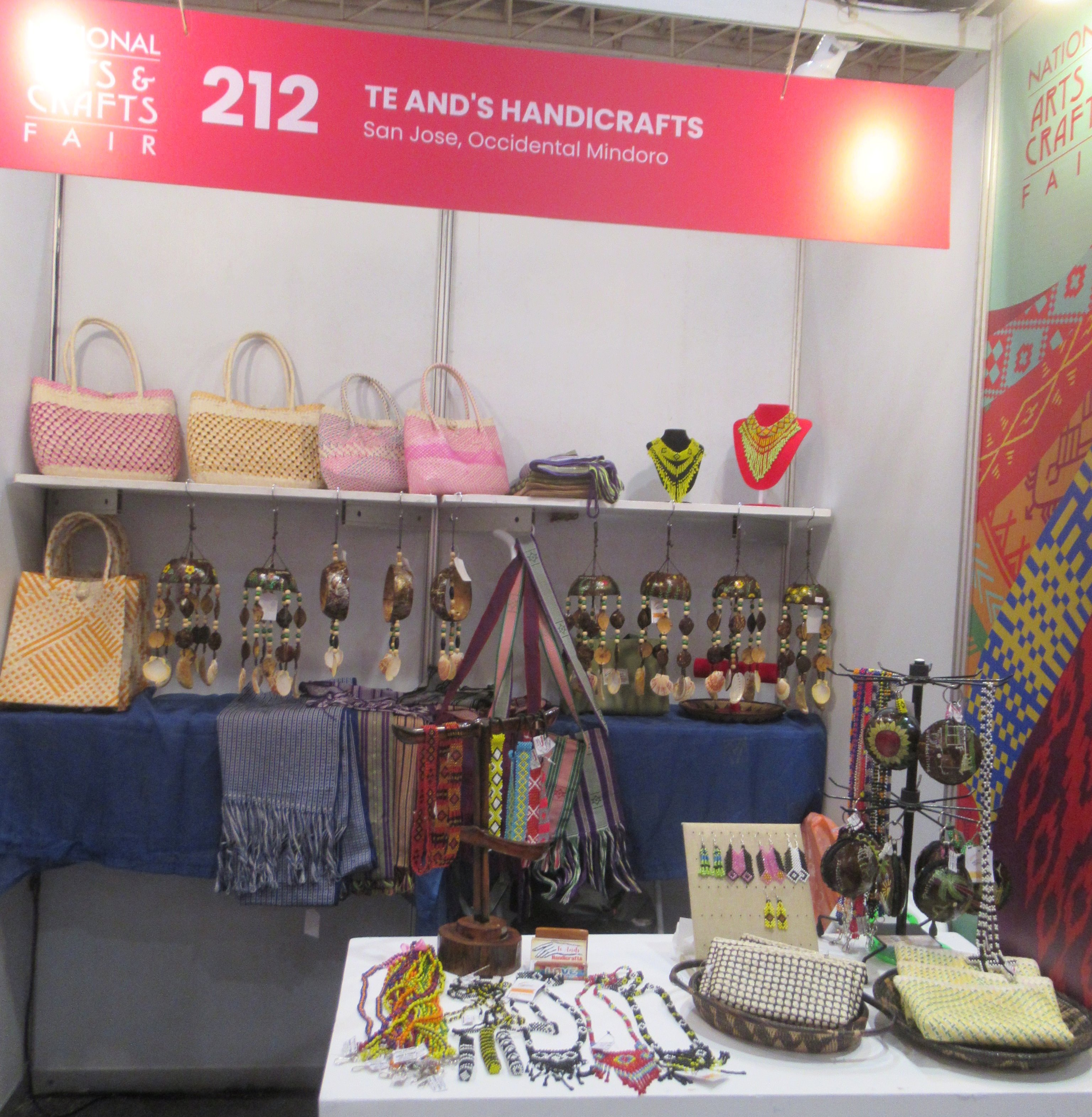
Mangyan inspired-handicrafts

Other major agricultural products include corn, garlic, onions, and root crops. Aquaculture is well-developed in San Jose which is known for its export quality lapu-lapu, bangus (milkfish), and sugpo (prawn). The town has abundant coastal and marine resources which provide an ample supply of fish and marine products for local consumption and exports.

Commercial livestock and poultry farms producing layers, broilers and meat products also exist. San Jose has a large number of agricultural support facilities such as rice mills, warehouses, solar dryers, and the like.

Registered commercial establishments number more than a thousand, and the public market, the center of commercial activities, is the largest in the province of Occidental Mindoro. Major fast food chains such as McDonalds, Mang Inasal, Chowking, Jollibee San Jose and Labangan Highway Branches, and local restaurants serve residents and tourists alike, while retail shopping centers such as Gaisano Capital San Jose, Unitop San Jose, SaveMore Shopping Center, Novo - United General Merchandise, and San Jose Town Mall offer shopping conveniences. Pharmacies are also scattered in the town center and nearby areas. Major banks such as Metrobank, Landbank of the Philippines, Development Bank of the Philippines, Philippine National Bank, Veterans Bank, Tamaraw Rural Bank, Chinabank San Jose and Labangan Branches, BDO Network Bank, BPI BanKo, Rizal Microbank - a Subsidiary of RCBC, First Consolidated Bank, City Savings Bank - a Subsidiary of Unionbank, Cardbank Branches can also be found in town. Numerous 7/11 branches are also present in major districts of the municipality. Dali Grocery has opened its first branch located along the National Highway in Bagong Silang which may open another branch in major locations in town.

Other industries include hollow blocks making, handicrafts, furniture, sweet goods and other food products (pasalubong), and other small-scale enterprises and home-based businesses.

Economic growth is likely to rise in the next decade with the influx of business interests, along with planned power and water supply improvements.

== Transportation ==
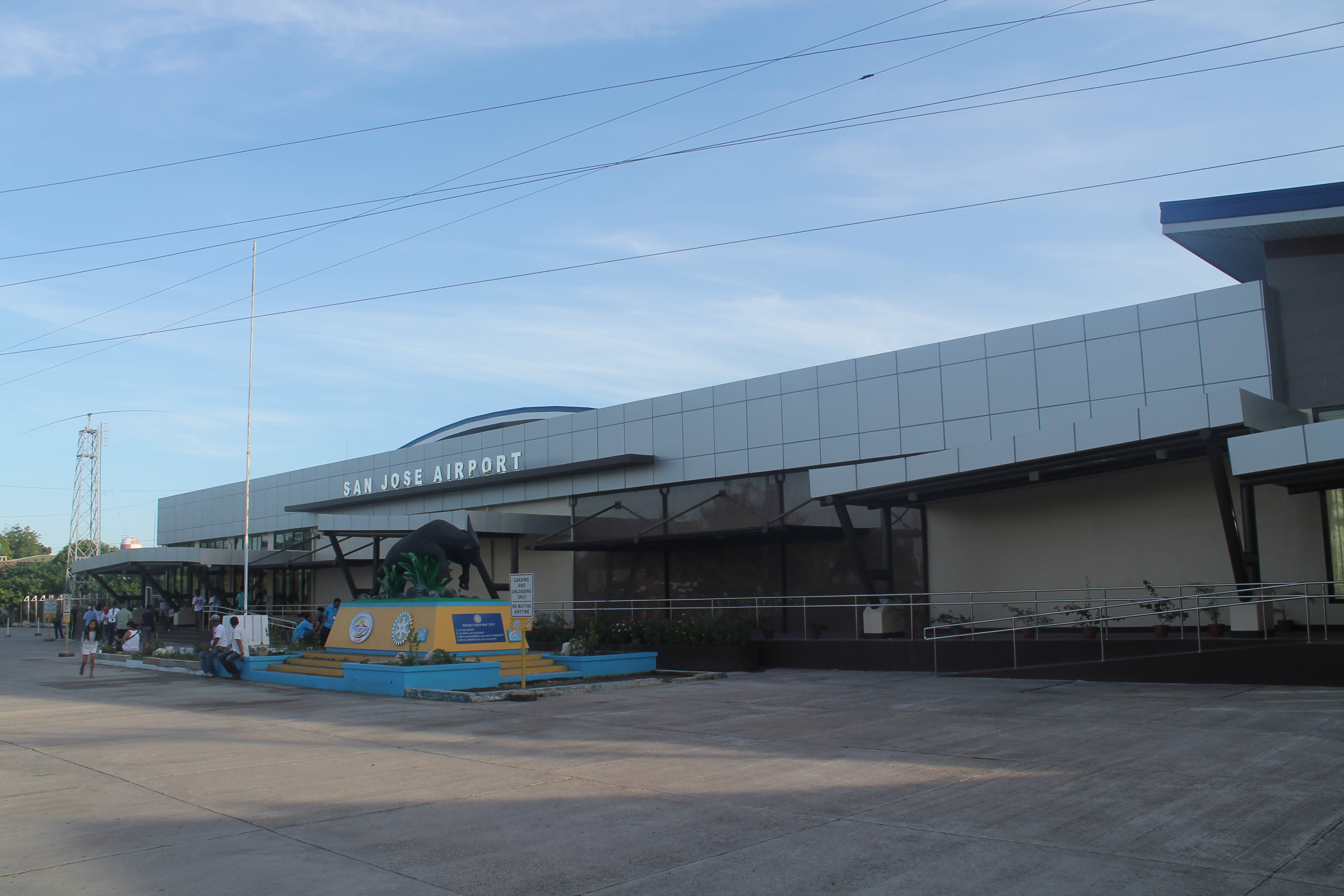
The entrance to the San Jose Airport

San Jose is accessible via the West Mindoro Coastal Road/Occidental Mindoro National Highway and the Philippine Nautical Highway System.

The town is served by the San Jose Airport via Cebu Pacific with regular scheduled flights to Manila. A new route was opened by Philippine Airlines connecting the town to Clark International Airport in Pampanga, with five regular weekly flight schedules. San Jose is also served by its seaport, Caminawit Port.

== Education ==
There are four schools district offices which govern all educational institutions within the municipality. They oversee the management and operations of all private and public, from primary to secondary schools. These are the:

- San Jose North Schools District
- San Jose East Schools District
- San Jose West Schools District
- San Jose South Schools District

Educational institutions in the province include Occidental Mindoro State University (OMSU) The Largest Public State University in Mindoro Island with 6 Campuses and has a Population of almost Twenty Thousand Students, Divine Word College of San Jose (DWC) The Largest Private Institution in the Province of Occidental Mindoro, San Jose Adventist Academy Inc. (SJAA), Montessori de San Jose, Philippine Central Islands College (PCIC), I-NET Asia Technological School, Inc., Southwest Philippines Ecumenical School Inc., Abeleda Technical School, Grace Christian School and Maranatha Christian Academy.

=== Primary and elementary schools ===
- Alitaytayan Elementary School
- Ambulong Elementary School (Annex Bulwang Primary School)
- Ambulong Elementary School (Annex Patag Primary School)
- Ansiray Elementary School
- Antipolo Elementary School
- Bagong Sikat Elementary School
- Bangkal Elementary School
- Batasan Elementary School
- Bato-ili Elementary School
- Beaulah Land Christian School
- Bubog 1 Elementary School
- Bubog 2 Elementary School
- Bunlao Elementary School
- Buri Elementary School
- Camanggahan Elementary School
- CAMBURAY Elementary School
- Caminawit Central School
- Catayungan Elementary School
- Catayungan Elementary School (Annex Silom Primary School
- Curanta Elementary School
- Danlog Elementary School
- G.E. Ramirez Memorial School
- Grace Christian School
- Hilltop Elementary School
- Himamara Elementary School
- Holy Family Academy
- Iling Elementary School
- Inasakan Elementary School
- Insulman Elementary School
- Ipil Elementary School
- Kalinisan Elementary School
- La Curva Elementary School
- Labangan Elementary School
- Labangan Elementary School (Bo. Site)
- Lagnas Elementary School
- Mabini I Elementary School
- Mabini II Elementary School
- Magbay Elementary School
- Manga Elementary School
- MANGARIN Elementary School
- Mangarin Elementary School (Annex I)
- Mapaya I Elementary School
- Mapaya II Elementary School
- Mapaya III Elementary School (Boundary)
- Mapaya III Elementary School (Catmon)
- Mapaya III Elementary School (Ong-Ong)
- Monte Claro Elementary School
- Maranatha Christian Academy
- Mother Caterina School (Poblacion)
- Mother Caterina School (Natandol)
- Murtha Elementary School
- Naibuan Elementary School
- Naitan Elementary SchoolS
- Narra Elementary School
- Natandol Elementary School
- Paaralang Mangyan na angkop sa Kulturang Aalagaan
- Pag-asa Central School
- Pawican Elementary School
- Pawican Elementary School (Annex Pitogo Primary School)
- Pawican Elementary School (Annex Tabay Primary School)
- Pawican Elementary School (Annex Tibago Primary School)
- Pulanglupa Elementary School
- Qui-anay Elementary School
- Quintal Elementary School
- Salafay Elementary School
- San Jose Adventist Academy / San Jose Adventist Elementary School
- San Agustin Elementary School
- San Agustin Elementary School (Annex D-6)
- San Isidro Elementary School
- San Jose Pilot Elementary School - The Biggest Public Elementary School in San Jose
- San Roque 1 Elementary School
- San Roque 2 Elementary School
- Siete Central Elementary School
- Southwest Philippines Ecumenical School
- Taganop Elementary School
- Tagumpay Elementary School
- Tugtugin Elementary School
- Yabat Elementary School
- Yaw-Yawi I Elementary School
- Yawi-Yawi II Elementary School

=== Secondary schools ===
- Ambulong Island Integrated School
- Bethany School of Technology and Humanities
- Bubog National High School
- Caminawit National High School
- Central National High School
- Iling National High School
- Iling National High School (Pawican Annex)
- La Curva National High School
- Mangarin National Highschool
- Mapaya National High School
- Pedro T. Mendiola Sr. Memorial National High School - The Second Largest Public High School in San Jose with more than 2000 Students
- San Jose National Agricultural and Industrial High School
- San Jose National High School - The Largest Public High School in San Jose in terms of Student Population with more than 4000 Students

=== Higher educational institutions ===
- Capt. Lawrence A. Cooper Technical College
- Divine Word College of San Jose
- Occidental Mindoro State University (Labangan - Main Campus)

- Graduate School and Studies
- College of Engineering
- College of Arts and Sciences
- College of Criminal Justice Education
- College of Business Administration and Management
- School of Architecture
- School of Hospitality Management

- Occidental Mindoro State University (San Jose Campus)

- College of Teacher Education
- College of Arts, Sciences, and Technology
- Basic Education Department

- Occidental Mindoro State University (Murtha Campus)

- College of Agriculture

- Philippine Central Islands College Foundation
- Westbridge Institute of Technology
