= Ambulong =

Island in the Philippines

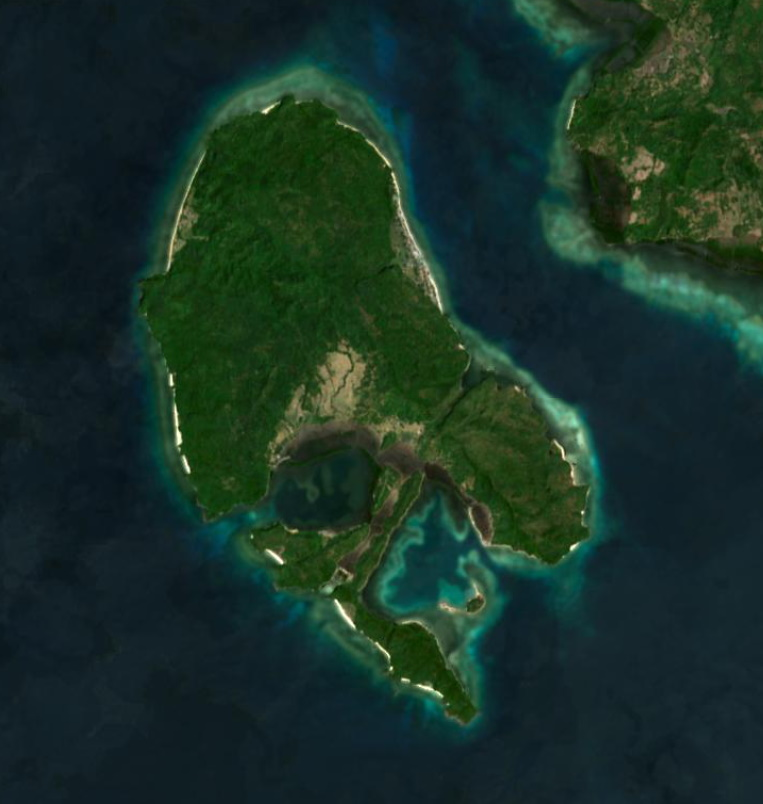
- Composite satellite image of Ambulong in 2020
- Interactive map of Ambulong

Geography
- Location: Mindoro Strait
- Coordinates: 12°12′56″N 121°00′52″E
- Archipelago: Mindoro

Administration
- Philippines
- Province: Occidental Mindoro
- Municipality: San Jose

Ambulong (also spelled Ambolon) is a small island in the Philippines located on the western side of the Ambolon Strait, that separates it from Ilin Island. Ambulong is located in Occidental Mindoro province of the Philippines, part of the municipality of San Jose. In 1919 it was described as "hilly and well wooded", and in 1919 its elevation at the northern part of the island was recorded at 567 feet (173 m).

The entire island constitutes one barangay with the same name in the municipality of San Jose. Its population in the 2020 census was 2,435 persons, up from 2,224 in 2015 and 1,539 in the 2010 census.

== See also ==
- List of islands of the Philippines
