= Ralph Guzman =

- Born: May 11, 1980 (age 46); Tuguegarao, Cagayan
- Occupations: Broadcaster, Journalist
- Years active: 2003–2010, 2016–present
- Spouse: Valerie Sychangco (m. 2019)
- Children: 1

Ralph Javier Guzman is a former reporter of GMA Network and from 2003 to 2010, and from 2016 to 2025, the radio station in Cagayan. DZCV 684 Tuguegarao, and in presently the FM radio station is 98.1 Radyo Bayanian in Peñablanca since 2025.

He covered the Malacañang Beat (Presidential Coverage). He was previously assigned at the Philippine House of Representatives, having covered the second impeachment attempt on President Gloria Macapagal Arroyo after the congresses in the Philippines. In 2016 Guzman left Manila and returned to Tuguegarao City and was reassigned to public radio station DZCV 684 Tuguegarao as a veteran anchor and reporter (until 2025), and now 98.1 Radyo Bayanian in Peñablanca as veteran reporter and anchor since 2025.

He produces stories for the Network's nationwide news programs. He has also produced for the program, Reporter's Notebook, and is substitute anchor for GMA Flash Report.

== Early life and education ==
Guzman was born and raised in Tuguegarao City, Cagayan. His parents are Prospero Guzman and Rosemarie Javier-Guzman. He is the youngest of 7 children.

He finished after his High School Department of University of Saint Louis Tuguegarao in 1998 and in his bachelor's degree at the University of the Philippines-Diliman in Quezon City in 2003.

== Personal life ==
In 2016, Guzman left to Manila and returning to Cagayan Valley he married a (94.1 Love Radio Tuguegarao, now with 98.1 Radyo Bayanian) anchor and host Valerie Pamittan Sychangco on December 23, 2019 and only her one child is Kristabelle (b. February 16, 2021). He resides in Peñablanca, Cagayan.

== See also ==
- GMA News and Public Affairs
- DZCV 684 Tuguegarao
- Official Site
