= COVID-19 pandemic in Cagayan Valley =

Ongoing COVID-19 viral pandemic in Cagayan Valley of the Philippines

- Confirmed cases in Cagayan Valley by province (as of August 25) (Note: Breakdown of confirmed cases is according to the COVID-19 Case Tracker of the Department of Health.) 100–499 confirmed 50–99 confirmed 10–49 confirmed 1–9 confirmed 0 confirmed
- Disease: COVID-19
- Pathogen: SARS-CoV-2
- Location: Cagayan Valley
- First outbreak: Wuhan, Hubei, China
- Index case: Tuguegarao
- Arrival date: March 21, 2020 (6 years, 3 months and 3 days)
- Confirmed cases: 171,908
- Recovered: 166,230
- Deaths: 4,750

Government website
- ro2.doh.gov.ph

The COVID-19 pandemic in Cagayan Valley is part of the worldwide pandemic of coronavirus disease 2019 (COVID-19) caused by severe acute respiratory syndrome coronavirus 2 (SARS-CoV-2). The virus reached Cagayan Valley on March 21, 2020, when the first case of the disease was confirmed in Tuguegarao. All provinces have confirmed at least one COVID-19 case, with Batanes being the last province to confirm a COVID-19 case on September 28, 2020.

== Timeline ==
Cagayan Valley confirmed its first case on March 21, 2020, that of 44-year-old male who had traveled via bus to Tuguegarao. The man arrived in Cagayan on March 11 and was treated at the Cagayan Valley Medical Center. Further cases were recorded in the province, as well as in Isabela and Nueva Vizcaya. By April 21, there are no active cases in Cagayan Valley, with a total of 27 confirmed in the region, among which one had died.

Cagayan Valley treated an imported case recorded as a case of the neighboring Cordilleras, that of a man from Lamut, Ifugao who was transferred from the Panopdopan District Hospital to the Region-2 Trauma and Medical Center in Bayombong, Nueva Vizcaya by April 26. The man's case was also the first confirmed case of Ifugao.

Quirino recorded its first case on August 12 after provincial Governor Dakila Carlo Cua's househelp tested positive for COVID-19 despite having no previous travel history to known affected areas.

Batanes was the last province in the region and the whole Philippines. It confirmed its first case on September 28. The case was that of a locally stranded individual who was brought home via a military helicopter on September 22. The patient was asymptomatic.
