= Manolo Favis =

Filipino radio personality (1939-2023)

- Born: Manuel Gravador Favis; February 24, 1939; Tuguegarao, Cagayan, Philippines
- Died: December 1, 2023 (aged 84); Quezon City, Philippines
- Occupation: Broadcaster
- Agents: ABS-CBN Corporation (c. 1969–1972); DZBB-AM (1980–2020); Radyo La Verdad 1350 (2020–2023)
- Known for: Dis is Manolo

Manuel Gravador Favis (February 24, 1939 – December 1, 2023), also known as Don Manolo Favis, (Note: Favis is also spelled Faviz in at least another source.) was a Filipino radio personality.

== Career ==
Favis, known as the "Golden Voice" of the Philippine radio, had been in the broadcast industry since 1970s; his programs and his commentaries focused more on life and society.

His career began being part of ABS-CBN prior to the martial law era. In 1971, Favis, along with Baby O'Brien, hosted the nightly program On With the Show on Channel 2; the latter was moved to the then sister station, Channel 4, where her own program became the competitor of his. He also became part of the then-DZXL (DZMM's predecessor) Radyo Patrol crew.

His popularity rose through radio industry when he became part of the GMA Network's DZBB-AM, notably in late-night program Dis is Manolo and His GENIUS Family Special beginning in 1980, where it discussed life according to various religious beliefs. The program was renamed Dis is Manolo in 1989, and eventually became a societal commentary program. He worked in the station for several years. There, he was known for playing Christmas songs in his program as early as July of every year.

In 2020, he left DZBB-AM and transferred to Radyo La Verdad 1350. He last anchored a noontime program, Ito Ang Inyong Lingkod, Don Manolo, from September 2020 to October 2023.

== Recognitions ==
In 2016, Favis, with Eddie Ilarde, were recognized by the Eastwood City Walk of Fame for radio category.

He was cited as one of the Legends of Philippine Radio during the United Nations World Radio Day 2019 Celebration at the Senate.

== Education, personal life and death ==
Favis began studying at age nine and he attended grade school in Tuguegarao West Central School in Tuguegarao (1948–1955), then the enroll of Cagayan National High School (1955–1959), and moved to Manila in 1959, he graduated for broadcasting in Mass Communication of Lyceum of the Philippines University (1959–1963) was an alumnus.

He died on December 1, 2023, at the age of 84.

== Filmography ==
=== Television ===
- On With the Show (ABS-CBN)

=== Film ===
- Payaso (1986)

=== Radio ===
- Operetang Putol-Putol (ABS-CBN–DZXL)
- Dis is Manolo (DZBB 594) (1989–2020)
  - Dis is Manolo and His GENIUS Family Special (DZBB 594) (1980–1989)
- Ito Ang Inyong Lingkod, Don Manolo (Radyo La Verdad 1350) (2020–2023)
