= University of Cagayan Valley =

Private university in Cagayan, Philippines

- Pamantasan ng Lambak ng Cagayan (Filipino)
- Former names: Cagayan Colleges Tuguegarao (1983–2010); Cagayan Teachers College (1948–1983)
- Motto: Amicitia et Scientia "Friendship and Knowledge"
- Type: Private, Non-sectarian University
- Established: April 1948; 78 years ago
- President: Susan Esther Perez-Mari
- Vice-president: Maria Lourdes Baricaua -Executive Vice President; Antonio Talamayan -VP for Academics; Lilia Tamayao -VP for Research, Publications, Planning and Development; Gregoria GJ Gocal -VP for Administration; Manrico Baricaua -VP for Finance
- Location: Tuguegarao, Cagayan, Philippines; 18°26′35″N 121°48′39″E
- Campus: Atty. Dr. Matias Ponce Perez Sr. Campus (College Ave. Campus) & Dr. Victor V. Perez (VVP) Campus formerly Balzain Campus
- Colors: Maroon and Gray
- Mascot: Greyhound
- Website: www.ucv.edu.ph
- Location in Luzon Location in the Philippines

The University of Cagayan Valley (UCV) is a private, non-sectarian university located in Tuguegarao, Cagayan, Philippines. It was formerly known as Cagayan Teachers College and Cagayan Colleges Tuguegarao.

== History ==
Dr. Matias Ponce Perez, Sr. founded Cagayan Teachers College in April 1948 due to a shortage of teachers in the Philippines after the Second World War. There were no institutions of higher learning in Tuguegarao or the nearby area, meaning someone had to go to Manila to obtain a college education.

The Cagayan Teachers College began with only elementary teacher's certificates and bachelors of science in education, but soon expanded to include other courses.

Cagayan Colleges Tuguegarao was changed to Cagayan Colleges Tuguegarao in 1983 due to its expansion into other fields.

In 2002, the institution was deputized by CHED to offer the Expanded Tertiary Education Equivalency and Accreditation Program (ETEEAP) under the BS Criminology Program. It was also designated by TESDA as the Assessment Center for Computer Hardware Servicing NCII and venue for skills assessments in housekeeping and automotive servicing NCII.

The College of Health opened in 2004 with two programs: the Bachelor of Science in Nursing and the Diploma in Midwifery.

The board of trustees and management submitted an application for university status, which was granted through CHED Resolution No. 186-2010, changing the name of Cagayan Colleges Tuguegarao to University of Cagayan Valley.

The first university assembly was held on July 19, 2010, and Dr. Victor V. Perez was installed as the first president on September 15, 2010.

Dr. Victor V. Perez bequeathed the university presidency to Dr. Esther Susan N. Perez-Mari after 39 years of service.

The university built a four-story laboratory building in 2013 to meet global requirements.

The university announced its intention to be certified for the ISO 9001:2008 Quality Management System by the BSI.

BSI issued its Certificate of Registration for the ISO 9001:2008 Quality Management System to the University of Cagayan Valley on October 7, 2015.

== Accreditation ==
UCV is ISO Quality Management System Certified 9000:2015 by British Standards Institution (BSI), the College of Maritime Education is also ISO certified by Det Norske Veritas (DNV) of Oslo, Norway, and programs are accredited by Philippine Association of Colleges and Universities Commission on Accreditation (PACUCOA).

The university is also accredited by TESDA, which offers Technical and Vocational Education and Training Program (TVET) under the Technical Education and Skills Development Authority and Commission on Higher Education (CHED).
