= DZCV =

Radyo Sanggunian (DZCV)
Tuguegarao; Philippines
- Broadcast area: Northern Cagayan Valley and surrounding areas
- Frequency: 684 kHz
- Branding: DZCV 684 Radyo Sanggunian

Programming
- Languages: Ibanag, Filipino
- Format: News, Public Affairs, Talk
- Affiliations: Radio Mindanao Network

Ownership
- Owner: Filipinas Broadcasting Network

History
- First air date: 1961
- Former frequencies: 740 kHz (1961–1978)
- Call sign meaning: Cagayan Valley

Technical information
- Licensing authority: NTC
- Power: 10,000 watts

DZCV (684 AM) Radyo Sanggunian is a radio station owned and operated by Filipinas Broadcasting Network. The station's studio and transmitter are located at Maribbay St. Ext., Brgy. Ugac Norte, Tuguegarao.

DZCV is home to Cagayan Valley's pioneering amateur singing contest, Addan Ta Kabitunan. It went on air 3 years before Tawag Ng Tanghalan came to existence.
