= Cagayan National High School =

Public high school in Cagayan, Philippines

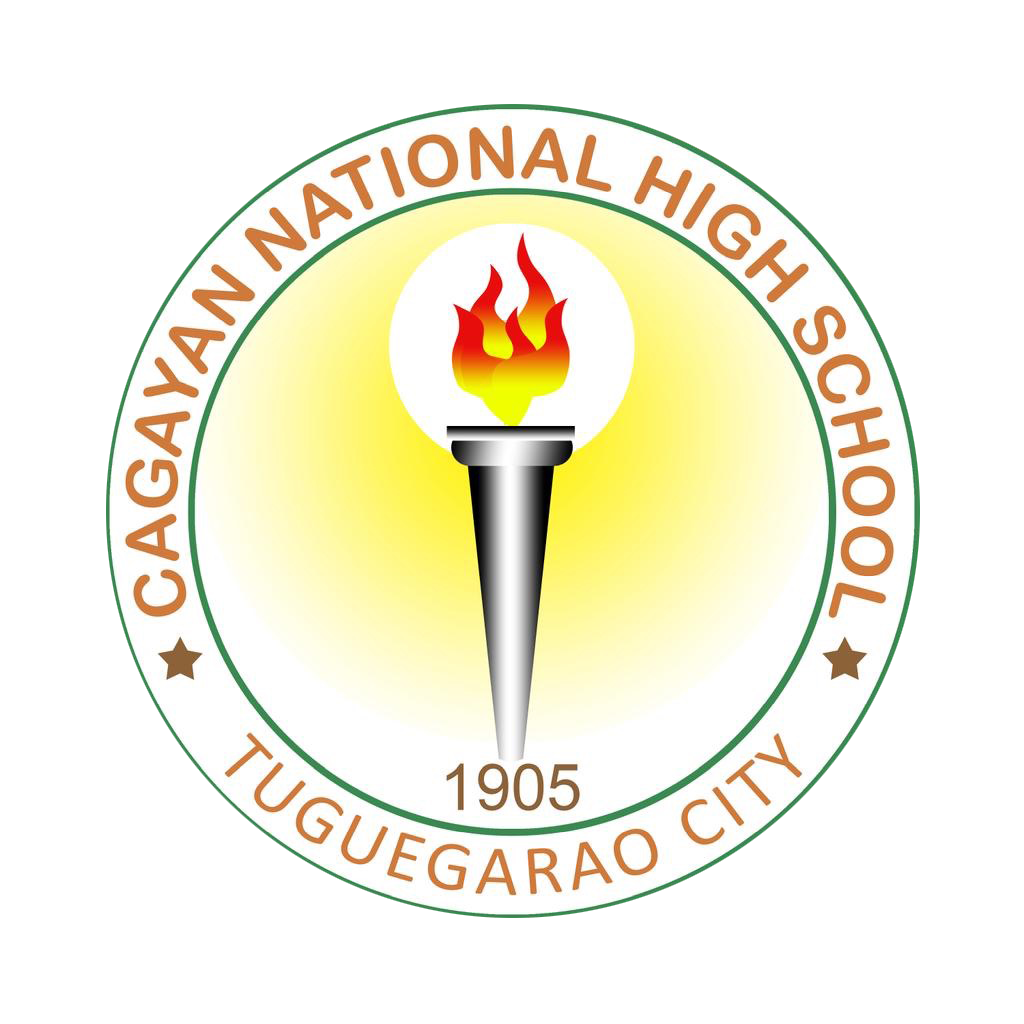

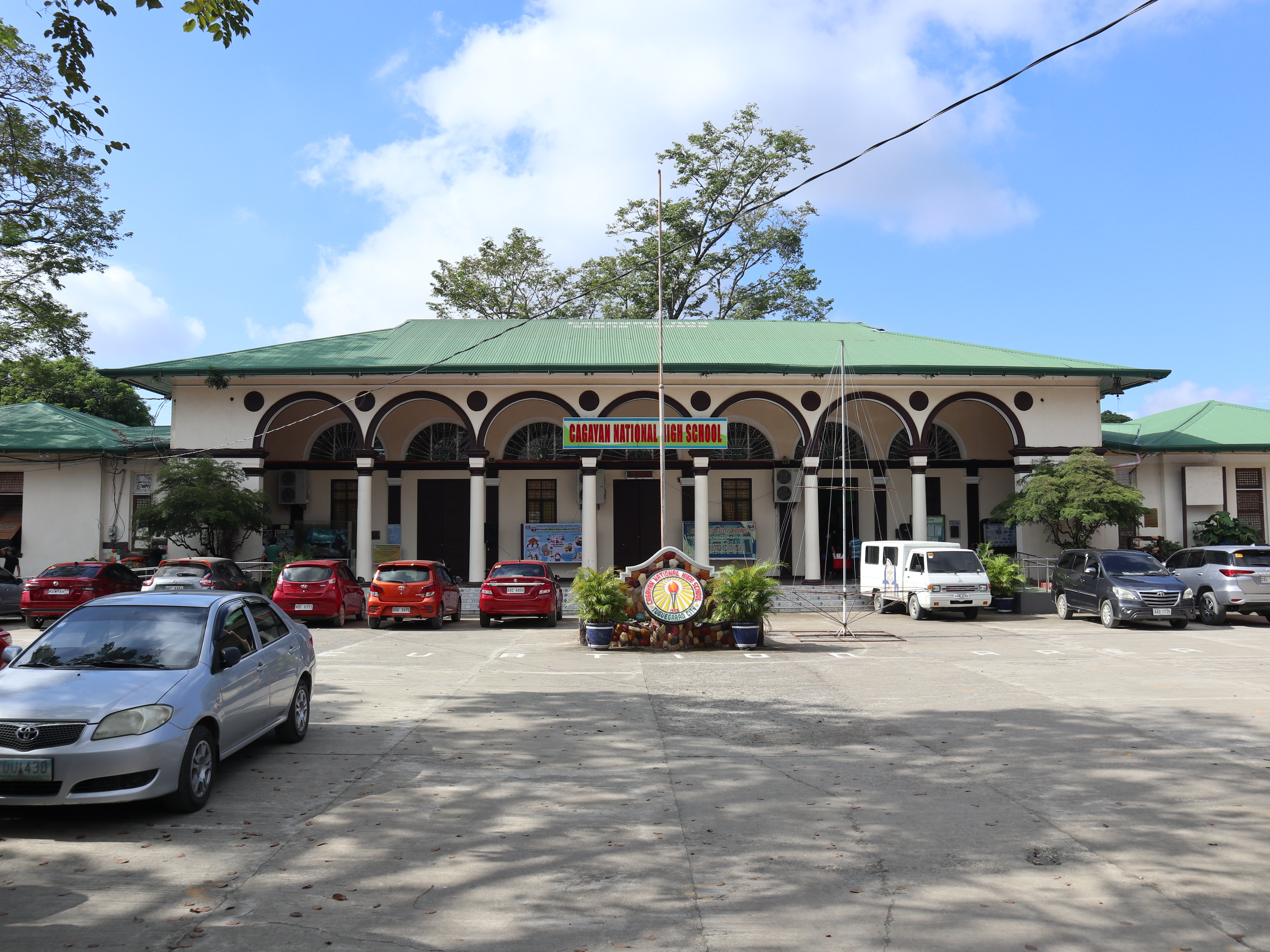
- The Main Building, commonly known as the Gabaldon Building, the oldest edifice in the campus, currently housing classrooms and the Conference Hall or the Old Library

Location
- Taft Street, San Gabriel Village; Tuguegarao City, Cagayan; Philippines; 17°37′08″N 121°43′21″E

Information
- Former names: Cagayan High School (1905–1976)
- Type: Public High School
- Motto: Builders of countless achievers
- Established: 1905; 121 years ago
- Oversight: Division of Tuguegarao City
- Principal: Eduardo C. Dela Rosa
- Teaching staff: ~300
- Grades: 7 to 12
- Newspaper: The Cagayan Students' Chronicle (English); Ang Bagwis (Filipino)
- Hymn: CNHS Hymn
- Former annex: CNHS-Cataggaman Annex (now Cataggaman National High School); Tuguegarao City, Cagayan
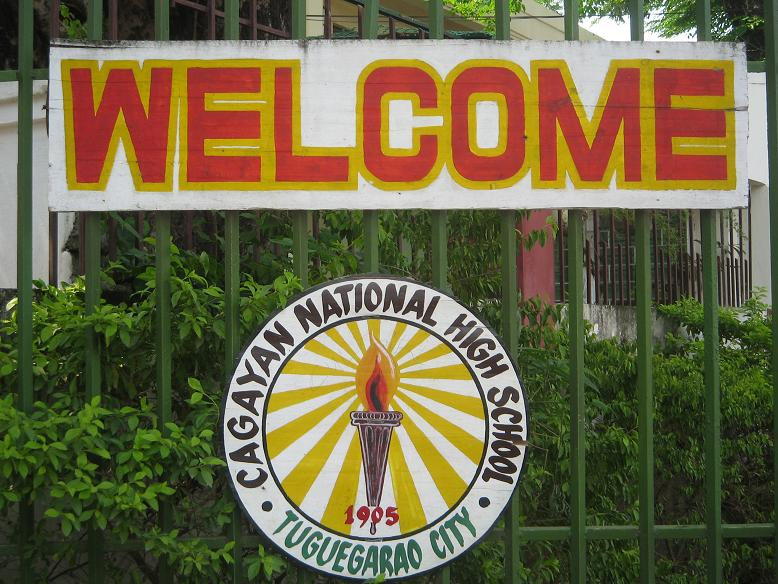

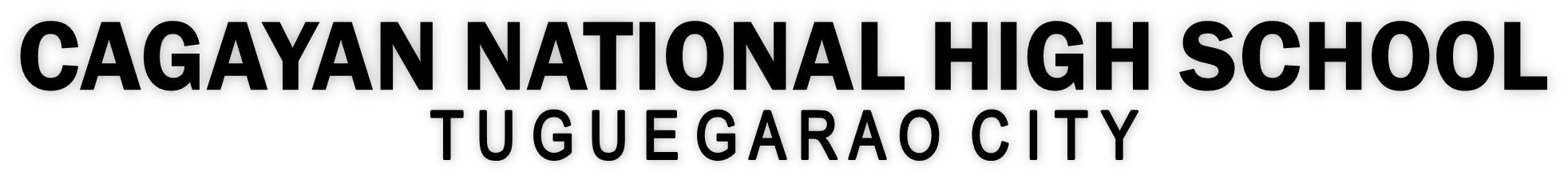

Cagayan National High School, abbreviated as CNHS and locally known as Cagayan High (Filipino: Pambansang Mataas na Paaralan ng Cagayan), is the universal high school of Region 2. It is located in Taft Street, Tuguegarao City, Cagayan, Philippines. Established in 1905, it is the oldest public secondary level school in Cagayan and the province's premier secondary school.

The school, which is administered by the Department of Education, has around 5,000 students. Its campus is fenced and gated, although some buildings outside the walls of the school are being used because of the great number of students. This is the biggest secondary school in Cagayan Valley.

Cagayan National High School was nationalized, from Cagayan High School, by virtue of Presidential Decree 1050 on July 1, 1976.

Cagayan National High School, like standard Public National High Schools in the Philippines, section their students according to the entrance exam scores taken before the students' first year. Students who identify themselves as (1) a passer of the Philippine Science High School National Competitive Examination (PSHS-NCE) or (2) an elementary school class valedictorian is exempted in taking the entrance exam but are required to submit proofs for validation.

== History ==
With the Thomasites as organizers, the Cagayan High School was formally opened in June 1905 with Albrow S. Burnell as its first principal. It was housed in Otto Weber's residence which was later on bought by the government for its first school building.

The school was situated on 16.5 hectares of land which was purchased by the provincial board of Cagayan under Governor Gracio Gonzaga.

Meanwhile, to solve the problem on teacher shortage, the school, which was at the same time a teacher training institution, offered Domestic Science in 1918 and a Secondary Normal Course in 1921. Then in February 1922, District Engineer Salesby laid the cornerstone of the new Cagayan High School building at its present site which was completed and inaugurated after a year.

After more than two decades, the American line-up of school administrators ended and Demetrio M. Andres, a native of Marikina, became the first Filipino principal of the school in 1931. During his term, post-graduate normal course was opened to meet the demand for elementary school teachers. However, in March 1937, the last group of secondary normal senior students graduated and for the first time, two valedictorians were proclaimed - one for the general course and one for the normal course.

Due to the outbreak of World War II, the school was forced to close for three years. Nevertheless, in September 1945, the school was reopened with a handful of teachers, holding classes in the bomb-shattered building. In July 1948, regular publication of The Cagayan Students' Chronicle which is the school organ of the Cagayan National High School up to this day, was resumed. In 1967 to 1972, the school was one of the ten pilot high schools in the country in teaching secondary English as a second language. As such, it was a regional center for the five-year English program.

The school year 1974–1975 started the implementation of the Revised Secondary Curriculum Program 1973 which is the present curriculum. Cagayan National High School witnessed a significant milestone in its history following its nationalization by virtue of Presidential Decree 1050 on July 1, 1976. Its principal then, Conrado I. Bacuyag, was the principal author of its nationalization.

In January 2022, the senior high school department of the school was separated to become the Cagayan National High School- Senior High, a separate school.

== Curricula ==
=== Junior high school ===
There are four curricula offered: the Restructured Basic Education Curriculum (RBEC) is for the majority of the students. The Engineering and Science Education Program-Special Science Classes (SSC-ESEP) is for the top 150 students in their batch, whose sections are named Gold, Silver, Nickel and Copper (other grade levels have added Antimony as one of these). The other curricula are for those in the Special Program in the Arts (SPA), which centers on nurturing talents of the students and the Special Program in Sports (SPS), which hones the students' talents through sports. SPA classes specialize in music, writing, drafting, dancing.

- Science, Technology, Engineering and Mathematics Education Program, formerly known as the Engineering and Science Education Program (ESEP) Curriculum
- Enhanced Basic Education Curriculum (EBEC), formerly known as the Restructured Basic Education Curriculum (RBEC)
- Special Program in the Arts (SPA)
- Special Program in Sports (SPS)
- Special Program in Foreign Language (SPFL)

=== Senior High School ===
Cagayan National High School pioneered its Senior High School program in the school year 2016–2017 with a handful of offerings — two strands in the Academic Track (STEM and GAS), the Technical Vocational Livelihood (TVL) Track and the Sports Track.

With the introduction of a new track, Arts and Design Track, and other strands for school year 2017–2018, Cagayan National High School is currently offering all tracks as prescribed by the Senior High School program, laid out by the K-12 Basic Education Curriculum.

In 2021, Cagayan National High School - Senior High became an independent school, which makes it the first Stand-Alone Senior High school in the province of Cagayan.

==== Academic Track ====
- General Academic Strand (GAS)
- Humanities and Social Sciences (HUMSS) Strand
- Science, Technology, Engineering, and Mathematics (STEM) Strand
- Accountancy, Business and Management (ABM) Strand

==== Technical Vocational Livelihood (TVL) Track ====
- Home Economics Strand
  - Beauty and Nail Care (NCII)
  - Hairdressing (NCII)
  - Wellness Massage (NCII)
  - Dressmaking and Tailoring (NCII)
  - Bread and Pastry Production (NCII)
  - Commercial Cooking (NCII)
  - Food and Beverage Services (NCII)
- Industrial Arts Strand
  - Automotive Servicing (NCII)
  - Electrical Installation and Maintenance (NCII)
  - Electronic Products Assembly and Installation (NCII)
  - Shielded Metal Arc Welding (NCII)
- Information and Communications Technology (ICT) Strand
  - Programming Oracle Database (NCIII)
  - Programming Java (NCIII)
  - Animation (NCII)

== Notable alumni ==
- Eulogio Balao, former Vice Chief of Staff of the Armed Forces of the Philippines, former Secretary of National Defense (1956–1957), former Senator (1957–1963), a Philippine Legion of Honor recipient with the rank of Commander. He graduated in Cagayan High School in 1926 and passed the entrance exams to the Philippine Constabulary Academy. Balao is remembered for his leadership in the Battle of Bessang Pass against General Yamashita's Japanese Armies holed up there during the battles for liberation of the Philippines.
