= DWCJ =

Radio station in Tuguegarao, Philippines

Radyo Bayanian (DWCJ)
Peñablanca; Philippines
- Broadcast area: Southern Cagayan and surrounding areas
- Frequency: 98.1 MHz
- Branding: DWCJ 98.1 Radyo Bayanian

Programming
- Languages: Ibanag, Filipino
- Format: Community radio
- Affiliations: Presidential Broadcast Service

Ownership
- Owner: National Irrigation Administration

History
- First air date: June 23, 2025

Technical information
- Licensing authority: NTC
- Power: 5,000 watts

DWCJ (98.1 FM) Radyo Bayanian (stylized as BayaNIAn) is a radio station owned and operated by the National Irrigation Administration. Its studio and transmitter are located in Brgy. Camasi, Peñablanca. It is the first station established by the agency.
