= Cagayan Valley Medical Center =

Government hospital in Cagayan, Philippines

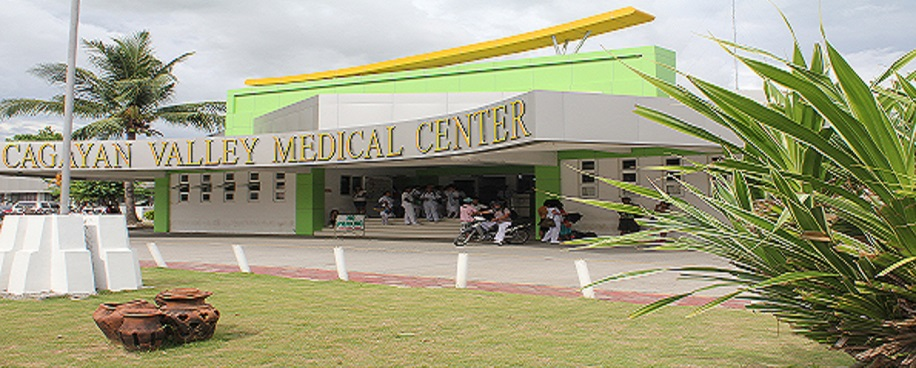
- The hospital's main entrance

Geography
- Location: Regional Government Center, Barangay Carig Sur, Tuguegarao City, Cagayan, Cagayan Valley, Philippines
- Coordinates: 17°39′24″N 121°44′48″E

Organization
- Funding: Government hospital
- Type: Level 3 (General)

Services
- Beds: 500 (authorized capacity)

History
- Opened: 1945 (as Tuguegarao Hospital)

Links
- Website: Cagayan Valley Medical Center

Cagayan Valley Medical Center is a government-owned tertiary hospital situated in Tuguegarao City, Cagayan. It is largest medical facility in the Cagayan Valley Region.

== History ==
=== Early years ===
In 1945 immediately after the end of World War II, the hospital was established as the 43rd Filed Hospital, an army tent set up by the 37th Infantry which came from Pangasinan under Major Anderson of the United States Marine Corps with cooperation with doctor Venancio del Rosario. It treated both American and Filipino soldier as well as civilians.

The American-aided clinic later ceased operations but the defunct Philippine Civilian Auxiliary Unit was converted into Tuguegarao Hospital on June 25, 1945, by Gregorio M. Reyes, the first Cagayan chief and a doctor. It had a 25-bed capacity but the management continued to use several USMC tents situated in front of the Cagayan High School. In June 1945, when schools started another school year and with the early start of the typhoon season, the hospital moved to the war-torn residence of Pedro Atabug and James Whitney. The wages and salaries of the Tuguegarao Hospital's staff and personnel were then funded through donations, shows and dance benefits.

=== Rehabilitation and expansion ===
The Tuguegarao Hospital underwent a rehabilitation. Nipa roof and sawali walls augmented the hospital structure. The funds of Secretary of Labor, Marcelo Adduru was significantly helpful in funding the hospital operations. On May 15, 1946, Adduru made the Philippine Relief and Rehabilitation Administration transfer three quonset huts to the hospital at no cost for the Tuguegarao Hospital's nurses' dormitory, storeroom, dispensary and doctor's quarters.

The Tuguegarao Hospital was converted into Cagayan Provincial Hospital in November 1945 through the virtue of a Cagayan provincial board resolution under the administration of then Governor Baldomero Perez. The hospital remained under the management of Gregorio M. Reyes. The Provincial board helped generate and set aside funds for the hospital's operation and maintenance and the hospital started to expand. When the hospital's old nipa roofing and the sawali walls started to deteriorate, the hospital transferred to the Division of Schools Building while simultaneously commenced the reconstruction of a two-storey semi-permanent building, which was later occupied by the Integrated Provincial Health Office.

Teogenes Alfonso took over the hospital management on September 28, 1947, when Reyes resigned on the same year to open his own private clinic. Justiniano M. Mendoza succeeded Alfonso who launched an intensive campaign targeted to people in rural areas to patronize the hospital's services and facilities. The two-storey building was inaugurated and opened on March 1, 1951, with an increased bed capacity. Menndoza resigned in August 1952 to study in the United States as a scholar.

=== Name changes and continued expansion ===
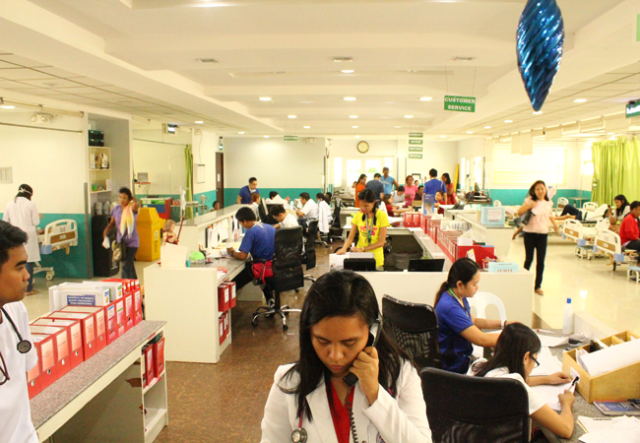
Interior of the hospital building.

The hospital now known as the Cagayan Provincial Hospital at that time was designated as Regional Training and Teaching Hospital per Department Administrative Order No. 79, s. 1963 which later was classified as a Tertiary Regional Hospital for Region 02, per Ministry Administrative Order No. 83, s. 1980, dated April 22, 1980.

On July 20, 1983, the Regional Health Office Laboratory, Regional Mental Hospital and the Cagayan Provincial Hospital were integrated and became the Integrated Cagayan Regional Hospital. In February 1986, this was transferred to its present site in Carig, Tuguegarao, Cagayan. A bill was proposed to change its name to Cagayan Valley Regional Hospital but did not prosper due to the EDSA Revolution of 1986. It was on September 15, 1989, that this proposal was made into a reality when the hospital's name was changed to Cagayan Valley Regional Hospital (CVRH) per Republic Act No. 6782.

On March 20, 1998, it was converted to Cagayan Valley Medical Center (CVMC) under RA No. 8599 with an authorized bed capacity of 500.
