= Tuguegarao =

Capital city of Cagayan, Philippines

- Component city
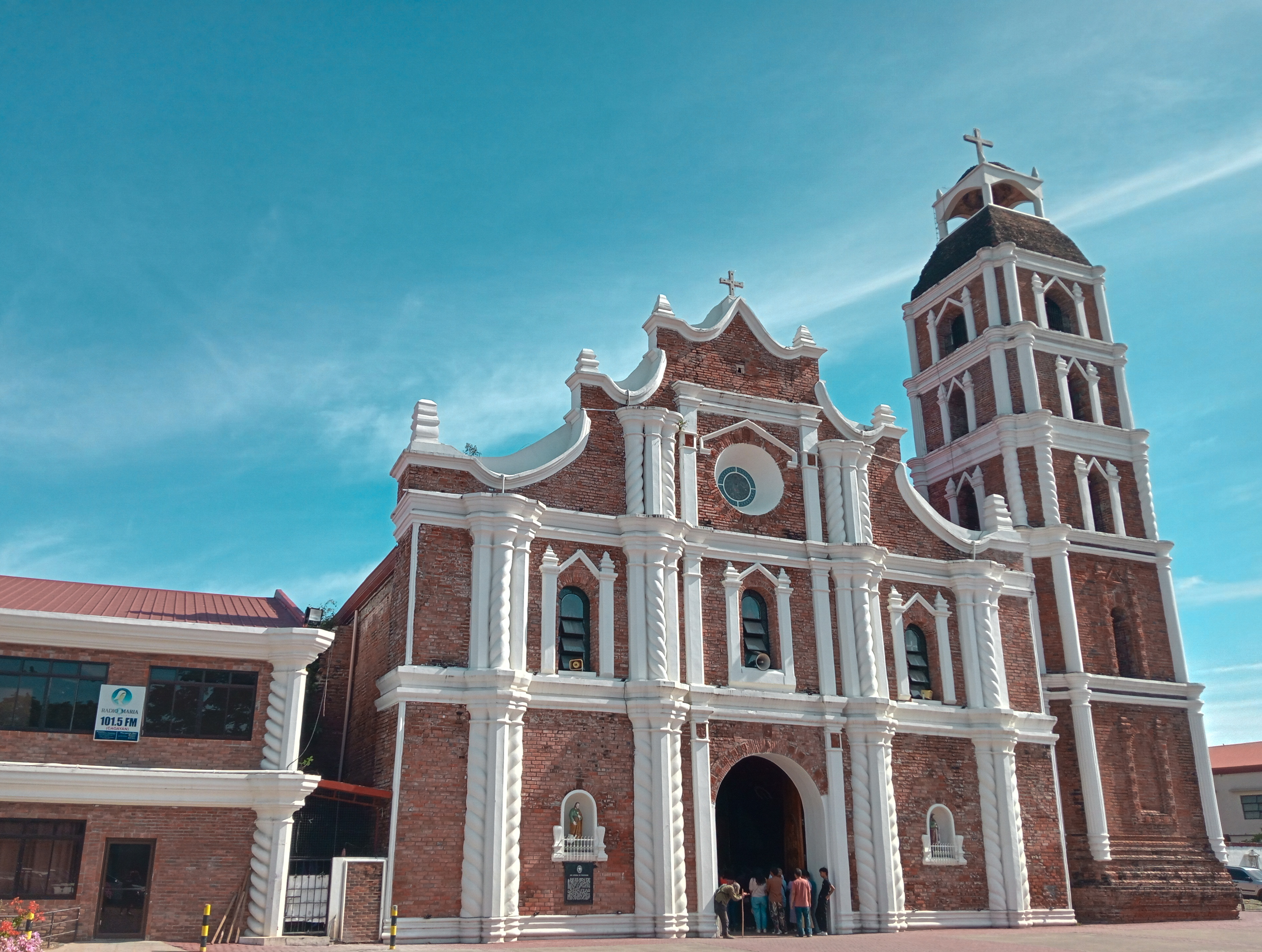
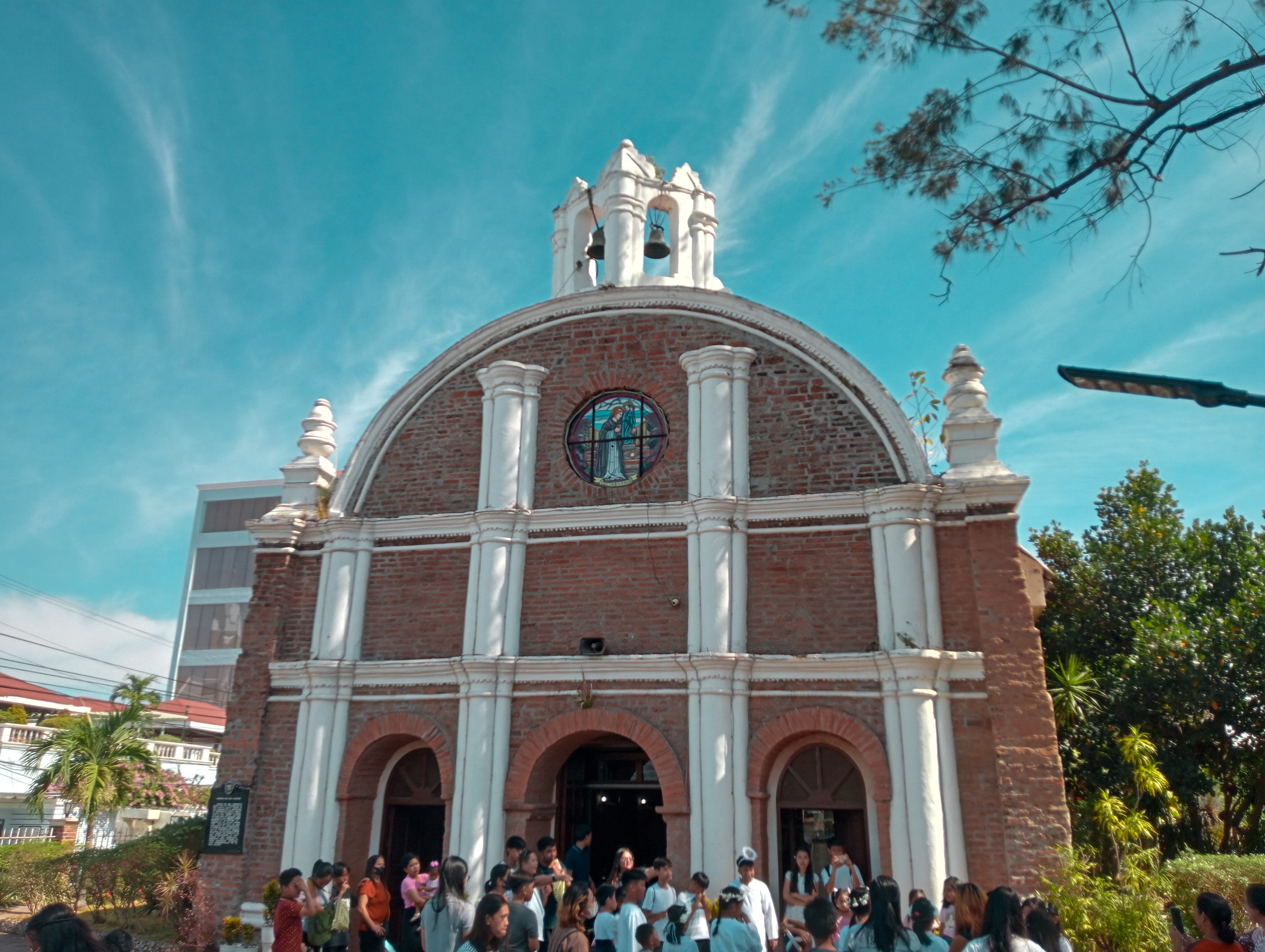
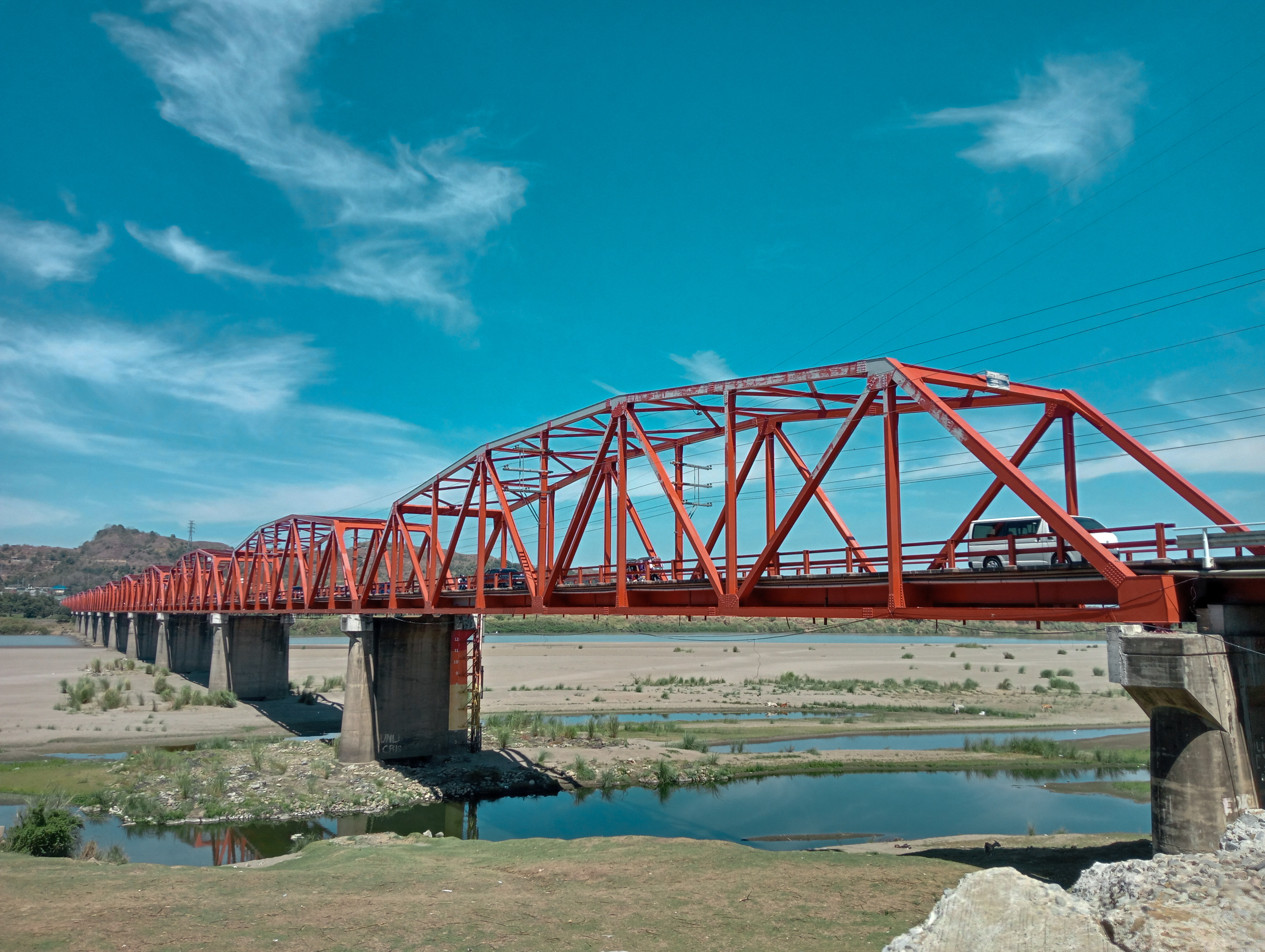
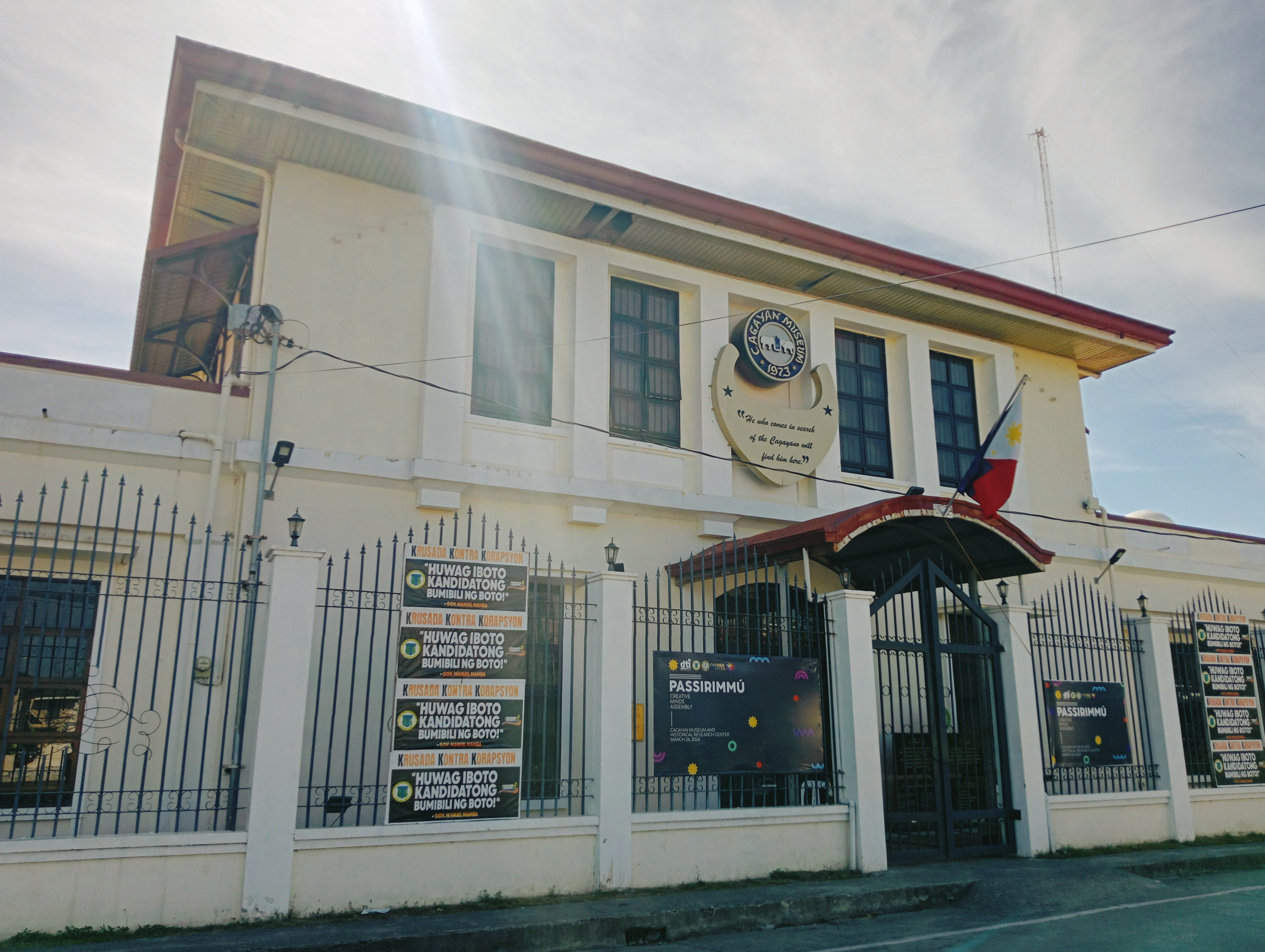
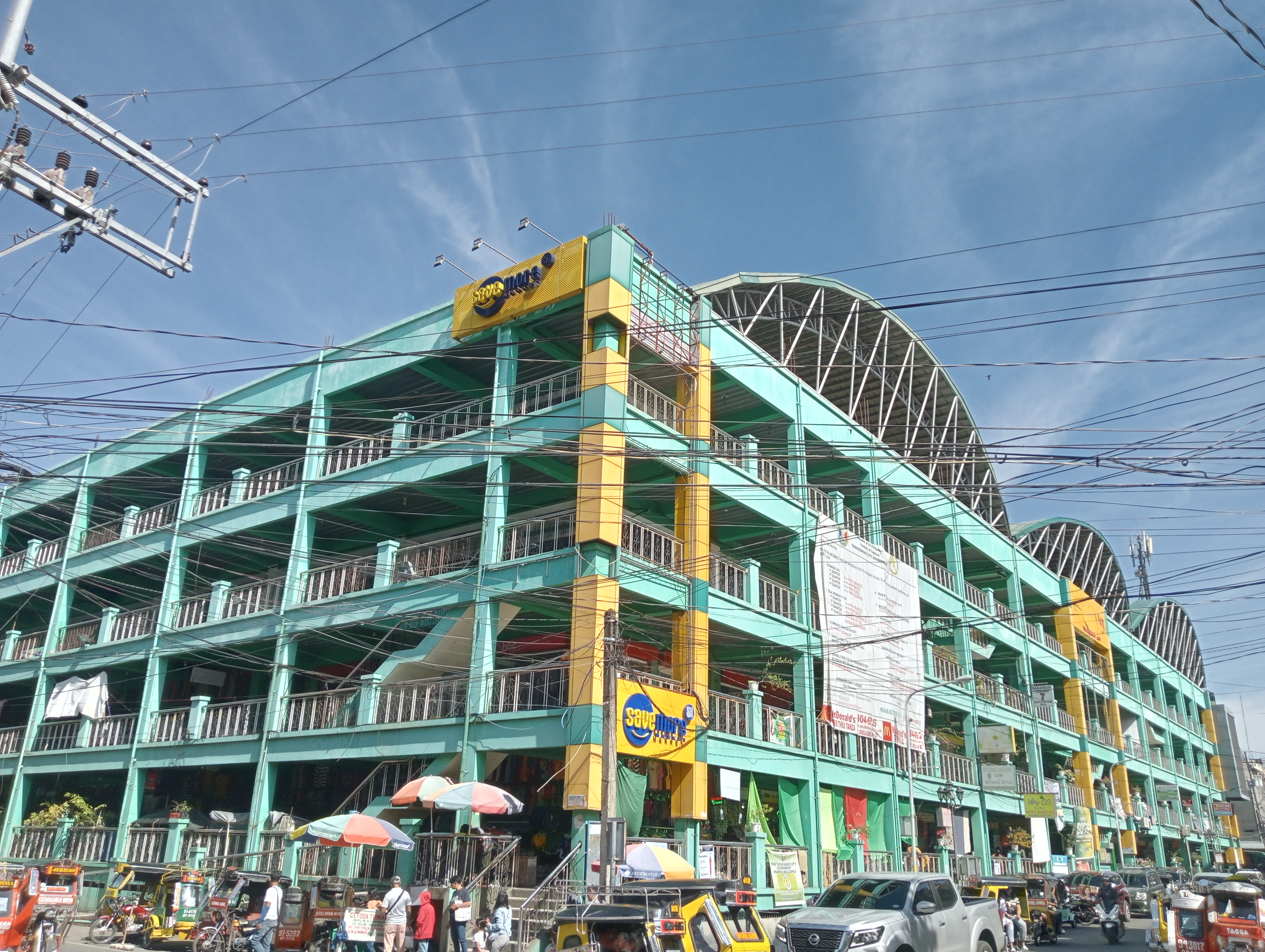
- From top, left to right: St. Peter Metropolitan Cathedral; San Jacinto Chapel; Buntun Bridge, the country's longest river bridge; Cagayan Museum; Tuguegarao City Commercial Center

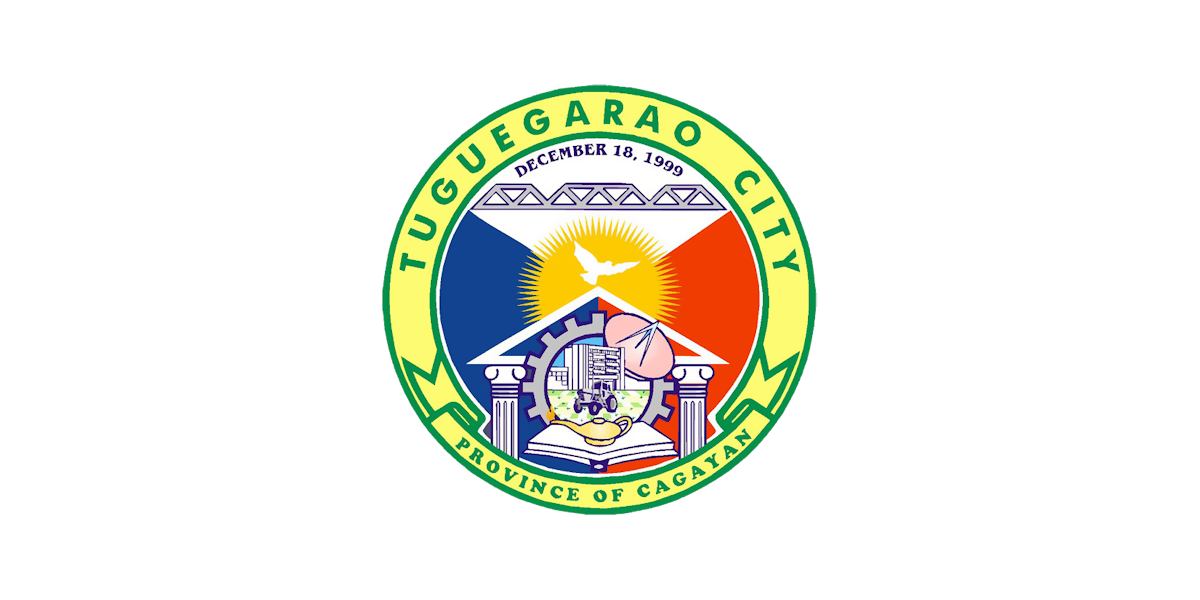
- Flag Seal
- Etymology: Ibanag: Tuggi gari yaw ("this was cleared by fire")
- Nickname: Premier Ibanag City
- Anthem: Tuguegarao City Hymn
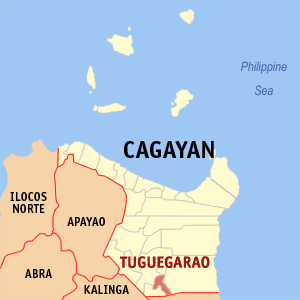
- Map of Cagayan with Tuguegarao highlighted
- Interactive map of Tuguegarao
- Location within the Philippines
- Coordinates: 17°36′48″N 121°43′49″E
- Country: Philippines
- Region: Cagayan Valley
- Province: Cagayan
- District: 3rd district
- Founded: May 9, 1604
- Cityhood: December 18, 1999
- Barangays: 49 (see Barangays)

Government
  - Type: Sangguniang Panlungsod
  - Mayor: Maila Rosario S. Ting-Que (NUP)
  - Vice Mayor: Rosauro Rodrigo G. Resuello (Lakas-CMD)
  - Representative: Joseph L. Lara (Lakas-CMD)
  - Councilors: List: Maria Rosario B. Soriano; Ronald S. Ortiz; Mark Angelo B. Dayag; Jude T. Bayona; Lope B. Apostol Jr.; Marc Aldous C. Baccay; Tirso V. Mangada; Dennis Ryan G. Avila; Myrna G. Te; Mariel Ayna T. Calimag; Karina S. Gauani; Anthony C. Tuddao
  - Electorate: 97,963 voters (2025)

Area
  - Total: 144.80 km^{2} (55.91 sq mi)
- Elevation: 120 m (390 ft)
- Highest elevation: 995 m (3,264 ft)
- Lowest elevation: 11 m (36 ft)

Population (2024 census)
  - Total: 167,297
  - Density: 1,155.4/km^{2} (2,992.4/sq mi)
  - Households: 37,896
- Demonym(s): Tuguegaraoeño (masculine); Tuguegaraoeña (feminine)

Economy
  - Income class: 2nd city income class
  - Poverty incidence: 3.16% (2023)
  - Revenue: ₱ 1,466 million (2024)
  - Assets: ₱ 4,909 million (2024)
  - Expenditure: ₱ 1,185 million (2024)
  - Liabilities: ₱ 1,323 million (2024)

Service provider
  - Electricity: Cagayan 1 Electric Cooperative (CAGELCO 1)
- Time zone: UTC+8 (PST)
- ZIP code: 3500
- PSGC: 021529000
- IDD : area code: +63 (0)78
- Native languages: Ibanag; Ilocano; Tagalog
- Patron saint: Hyacinth of Poland
- Website: www.tuguegaraocity.gov.ph

Tuguegarao (/tʊˈɡɛɡəraʊ/ or /tʊɡɛɡəˈraʊ/), officially the City of Tuguegarao (Ibanag: Siyudad nat Tugegaraw; Itawit: Siyudad yo Tugegaraw; Ilocano: Siudad ti Tuguegarao; Filipino: Lungsod ng Tuguegarao [tʊgɛ̝gäˈɾaʊ]), is a component city and capital of the province of Cagayan, Philippines. According to the 2024 census, it has a population of 167,297 people, making it the most populous city in Cagayan Province, Cagayan Valley and Northeastern Luzon.

It is a major urban center and the primary growth center in the Northeastern Luzon. It is the regional center of the Cagayan Valley and is also its regional institutional and administrative center. The city is a convergence area for the provinces of Cagayan, Kalinga, Apayao and northern Isabela and is one of the fast-emerging cities in the Philippines.

Dubbed as the "Gateway to the Ilocandia and the Cordilleras," the city is located on the southern border of the province where the Pinacanauan River empties into the Cagayan River. It is surrounded by the Sierra Madre Mountains to the east, Cordillera Mountains to the west, and the Caraballo Mountains to the south.

The highest temperature ever recorded in the Philippines—42.2 °C (108.0 °F)—hit Tuguegarao on May 11, 1969.

== Etymology ==
Taraw is a palm tree in the area and garao is a reference to the "swift river current".

The popular version based on legend is the Ibanags' reply to the Spaniards when asked for the name of the place: Tuggi gari yaw ("this was cleared by fire").

The origin of the city's name is unknown, but historical evidence suggests it was originally a pre-colonial settlement called Tubigarao. In 1591, the place was listed as a Spanish encomienda.

== History ==
Historical affiliations

Kingdom of Spain 1604–1899
United States of America 1899–1941
Empire of Japan 1941–1945
Philippines 1946–present

=== Spanish colonial era ===
Tuguegarao was founded on May 9, 1604, as a "mission-pueblo" with the new vicar Fray Tomas Villa, O.P. initiating the construction of a temporary church housing Sts. Peter and Paul as patron saints.

In the 1720s, Father Antonio Lobato, O.P. developed a layout of street network together with the construction of the cathedral. In 1839, the provincial capital was transferred to Tuguegarao from Lal-lo as the Cagayan-Manila road opened which spurred socio-economic progress.

=== American era ===
The town was occupied by American troops on December 12, 1899. Drastic improvements in Tuguegarao were discerned over the course of provincial administrations—the first Provincial Capitol was completed in 1909, a town hall and public market were built, the provincial high school—Cagayan High School—was founded in a former private residence, and the Cagayan Valley College of Arts & Trades was founded by American educator Claude Andrews.

=== Japanese occupation ===
During World War II, the city and its airfield was bombed at the opening of the Pacific War on 8 December 1941. The city fell to the Japanese Imperial Army on 12 December 1941, as part of the Japanese invasion of Aparri. The General Headquarters of the 11th Infantry Regiment, Philippine Commonwealth Army, USAFIP-NL was activated in 1942 and stationed in Tuguegarao. Following an escalation of fighting during the closing months of the war, the Japanese fled to the barrio of Capatan. Tuguegarao was liberated by Allied forces on 25 June 1945.

=== Postwar era ===
Sitio Capatan was elevated into a barrio (or barangay) of Tuguegarao on April 3, 1959, by Republic Act No. 2107.

=== During the Marcos dictatorship ===
Loan-funded government spending to promote Ferdinand Marcos’ 1969 reelection campaign caused the Philippine economy to take a sudden downwards turn in the last months of the 1960s. Known as the 1969 Philippine balance of payments crisis, this led to social unrest throughout the country beginning with the First Quarter Storm protests of 1970, and incidents of violence like the Plaza Miranda bombing. Marcos responded by vilifying his critics as "communists" and suspending the privilege of the writ of habeas corpus through Proclamation No. 889 in August 1971, but this had the effect of pushing moderate student protesters towards the radical left, and causing many of them to go home to their home provinces like Cagayan. Marcos' actions thus lead the Marxist–Leninist–Maoist Communist Party of the Philippines to gain a significant presence in many Cagayan municipalities, although not as much in Tuguegarao itself.

With only a year left in his last constitutionally allowed term as president, Ferdinand Marcos placed the Philippines under Martial Law in September 1972 and thus retained the position for fourteen more years. This period in Philippine history is remembered for the Marcos administration's record of human rights abuses, particularly targeting political opponents, student activists, journalists, religious workers, farmers, and others who fought against the Marcos dictatorship. In Tuguegarao, Camp Marcelo Adduru became the province's main detention center for "political detainees," who were often never formally charged with a crime, and thus technically not counted by Marcos as "prisoners."

Others disappeared without the trace for daring to speak against Marcos, such as Romeo G. Crismo, a teacher at Cagayan Teacher's College and St. Louis College in Tuguegarao, who criticized the 1973 Philippine constitutional plebiscite as a sham election. He disappeared without a trace in August 1980 after unknown men tried to capture him in front of his students the day before. He was later honored by having his name inscribed on the wall of remembrance of the Philippines' Bantayog ng mga Bayani in recognition of his martyrdom while resisting authoritarianism, despiste controversial leagacy.

During the Cold War, the Marcos administration justified its campaign against communist groups as part of the broader conflict between communist and anti-communist forces. Both government and opposition forces were involved in armed conflict and were accused of committing human rights abuses. Armed student and political groups were also involved in violent activities, including attacks against civilians. Accounts of the period differ regarding the motivations and actions of the various groups involved.

=== Declaration as regional capital ===
In 1975, Tuguegarao was declared as regional center of Cagayan Valley (Region II) being the region's geographic center with adequate facilities and amenities needed by such. The designation was made through the influence of Juan Ponce Enrile without the enactment of a Republic Act. Multistory buildings were constructed in the poblacion greatly changing Tuguegarao's skyline in the 1980s and 1990s.

=== Hotel Delfino siege ===
On March 4, 1990, former Colonel and suspended Cagayan Governor Rodolfo Aguinaldo seized the Hotel Delfino using his private army of about 300 men. Aguinaldo stood accused of supporting the Dec. 1–9, 1989 coup attempt against President Corazon Aquino. Brigadier General Oscar Florendo, armed forces chief of Civil Military Relations, was sent to Tuguegarao by Aquino to serve Aguinaldo with an arrest warrant. After Aguinaldo's men seized control of Hotel Delfino where the general was staying, Florendo was taken hostage along with more than 50 other hotel guests. Florendo was eventually shot inside the hotel and died of his wounds. Following hours of standoff between the two sides, nearly 1,000 government troops launched an attack to dislodge Aguinaldo's forces from the hotel. During this melee, Aguinaldo fled with about 90 fighters for mountains in the north and went into hiding for several months until he surrendered, only to be cleared of all legal charges by winning reelection in 1992.

=== Cityhood ===
Tuguegarao was officially converted from a municipality into a component city through Republic Act No. 8755, titled "An Act Converting the Municipality of Tuguegarao, Cagayan Province into a Component City to be known as Tuguegarao City." The bill was signed into law on November 4, 1999, by President Joseph Estrada and later ratified via a plebiscite on December 18, 1999.

== Geography ==
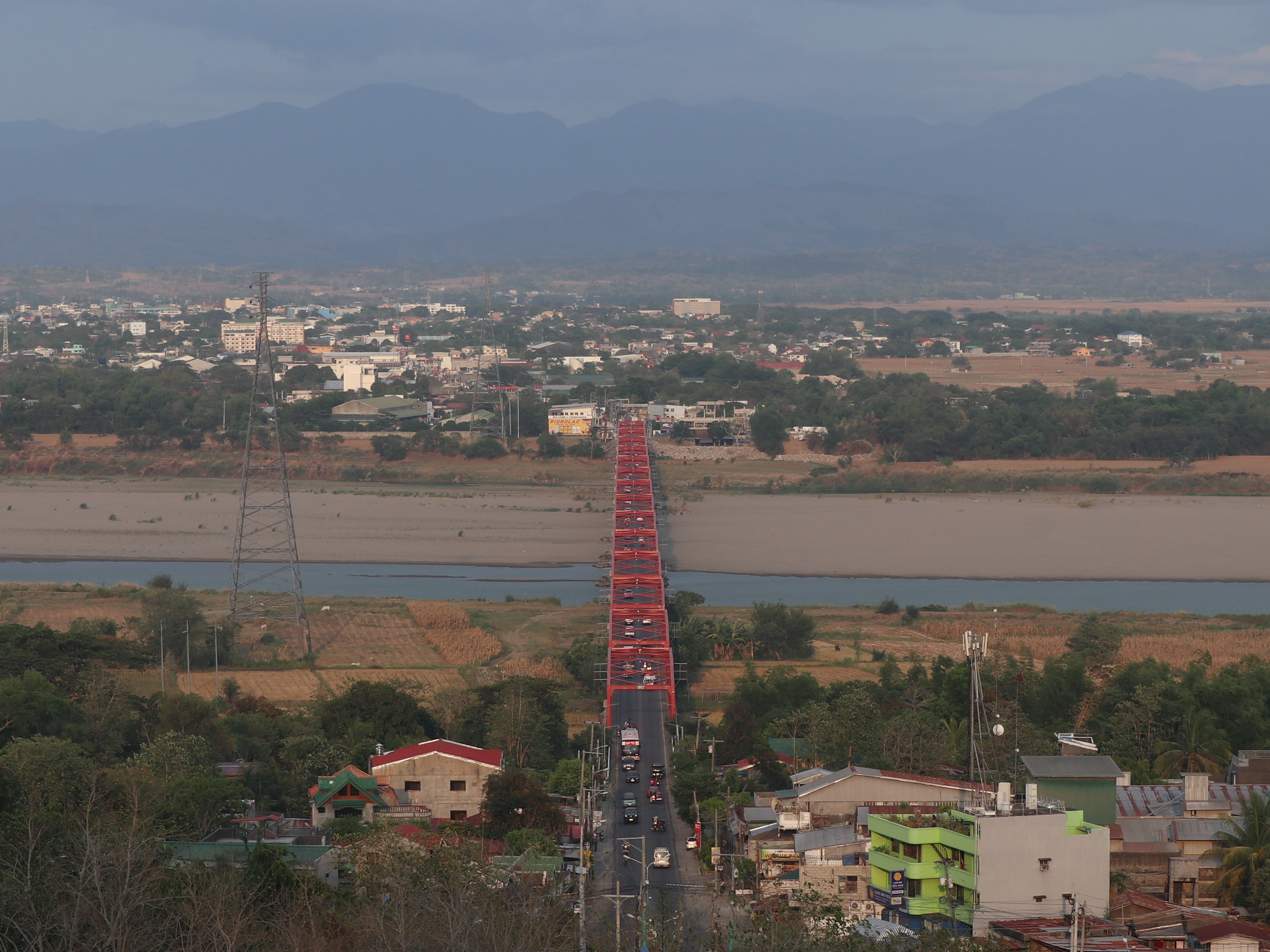
Tuguegarao City skyline viewed from neighboring town Solana. Shown in the background is the Sierra Madre mountain range while the foreground features the Cagayan River and Buntun Bridge.

Tuguegarao's location is in the southern portion of the province. The city is bordered by Iguig to the north; to the west by the Cagayan River and Solana; Peñablanca to the east; and to the south by Enrile and San Pablo, Isabela. The river delta city is almost encapsulated by the Cagayan River in the western and southern side, which explains for its northward expansion, and the Pinacanauan River, a tributary of Cagayan River, in the eastern part. Small bodies of waters are found in the city, such as the Balzain Creek which spans the barangays of Caritan Sur and Balzain. Currently, the creek is continuously drying up due to eutrophication and the uncontrollable growth of water lilies.

Historically, the town was inhabited by Irayas and Itawes who lived and mainly relied on fishing, farming, hunting and livestock raising. In addition, ancient natives have ventured on weaving cloth and making of household and farm implements.

Cagayan is divided into three congressional districts, wherein the city is included in the Third District together with the other 6 southern municipalities.

Tuguegarao is located 486.14 kilometres (302.07 mi) north of the country's capital city of Manila, which is ten hours of land travel. The city can be reached by an hour through plane travel.

=== Barangays ===
Tuguegarao is politically subdivided and comprises into 49 barangays. Each barangay consists of puroks while some have sitios.

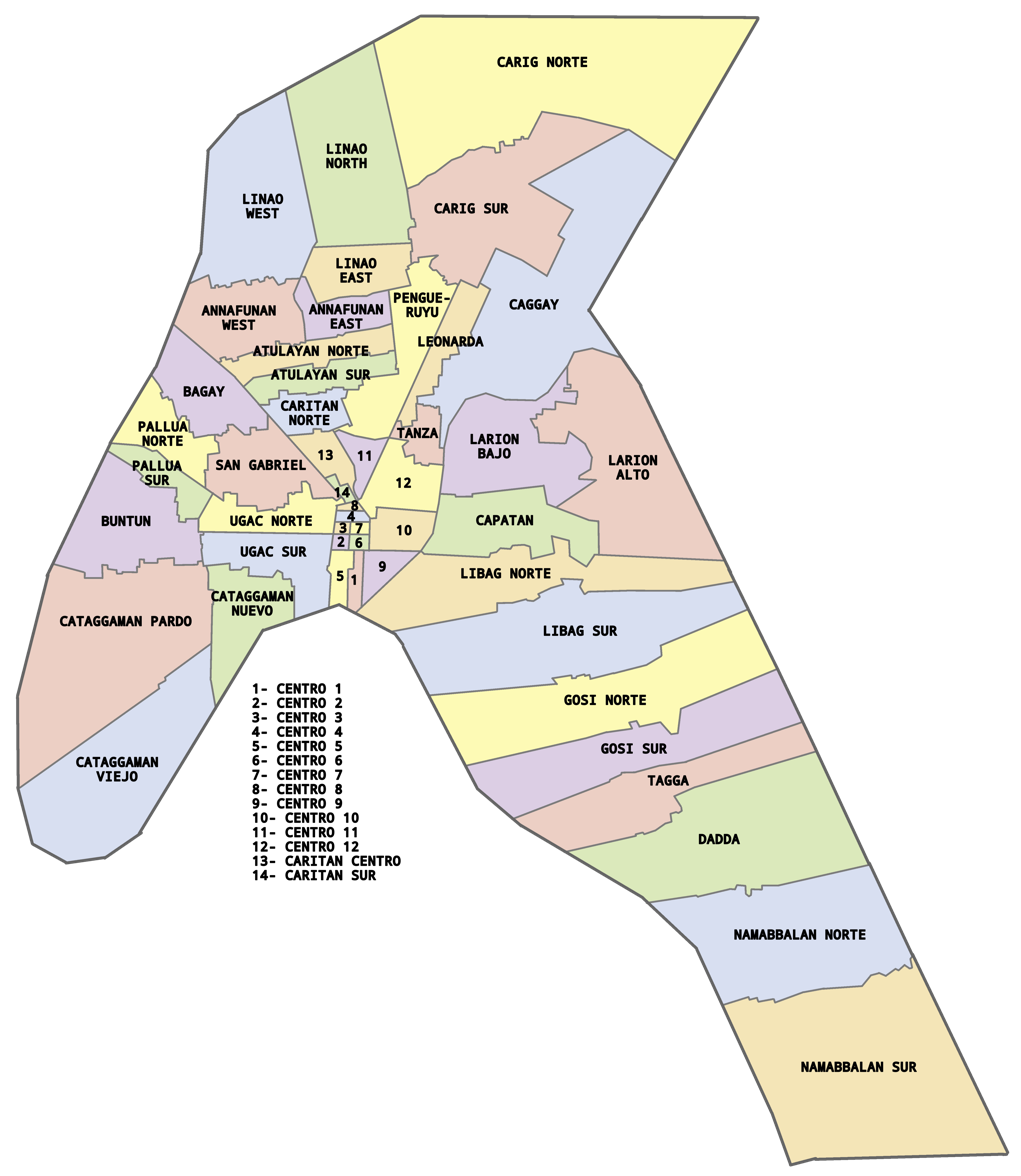
Political Subdivisions of Tuguegarao City

There are 31 barangays in the city that are considered urban (highlighted in bold).

- **Annafunan East**
- **Annafunan West**
- **Atulayan Norte**
- **Atulayan Sur**
- Bagay
- **Buntun**
- **Caggay**
- Capatan
- Carig Norte
- **Carig Sur**
- **Caritan Centro**
- **Caritan Norte**
- **Caritan Sur**
- **Cataggaman Nuevo**
- Cataggaman Pardo
- Cataggaman Viejo
- **Centro 01** (Bagumbayan)
- **Centro 02**
- **Centro 03**
- **Centro 04**
- **Centro 05** (Bagumbayan)
- **Centro 06**
- **Centro 07**
- **Centro 08**
- **Centro 09** (Bagumbayan)
- **Centro 10** (Riverside)
- **Centro 11** (Balzain East)
- **Centro 12** (Balzain West)
- Dadda
- Gosi Norte
- Gosi Sur
- Larion Alto
- Larion Bajo
- **Leonarda**
- **Libag Norte**
- **Libag Sur**
- Linao East
- Linao Norte
- Linao West
- Namabbalan Norte
- Namabbalan Sur
- Pallua Norte
- Pallua Sur
- **Pengue-Ruyu**
- **San Gabriel**
- Tagga
- **Tanza**
- **Ugac Norte**
- **Ugac Sur**

=== Climate ===
Climate data for Tuguegarao (1991–2020, extremes 1903–2020)
Month	Jan	Feb	Mar	Apr	May	Jun	Jul	Aug	Sep	Oct	Nov	Dec	Year
Record high °C (°F)	37.2 (99.0)	38.4 (101.1)	40.0 (104.0)	42.2 (108.0)	42.2 (108.0)	41.7 (107.1)	41.0 (105.8)	39.4 (102.9)	38.9 (102.0)	38.5 (101.3)	37.8 (100.0)	38.5 (101.3)	42.2 (108.0)
Mean daily maximum °C (°F)	28.3 (82.9)	29.8 (85.6)	32.5 (90.5)	35.1 (95.2)	35.6 (96.1)	35.2 (95.4)	33.7 (92.7)	33.2 (91.8)	32.7 (90.9)	31.2 (88.2)	29.6 (85.3)	27.9 (82.2)	32.1 (89.8)
Daily mean °C (°F)	23.6 (74.5)	24.5 (76.1)	26.6 (79.9)	28.9 (84.0)	29.5 (85.1)	29.4 (84.9)	28.5 (83.3)	28.2 (82.8)	27.8 (82.0)	26.6 (79.9)	25.4 (77.7)	23.8 (74.8)	26.9 (80.4)
Mean daily minimum °C (°F)	18.9 (66.0)	19.2 (66.6)	20.8 (69.4)	22.6 (72.7)	23.4 (74.1)	23.6 (74.5)	23.3 (73.9)	23.3 (73.9)	23.0 (73.4)	22.0 (71.6)	21.1 (70.0)	19.8 (67.6)	21.7 (71.1)
Record low °C (°F)	12.0 (53.6)	12.9 (55.2)	14.0 (57.2)	16.3 (61.3)	17.5 (63.5)	17.0 (62.6)	17.0 (62.6)	19.0 (66.2)	17.6 (63.7)	14.8 (58.6)	12.8 (55.0)	11.5 (52.7)	11.5 (52.7)
Average rainfall mm (inches)	33.7 (1.33)	32.2 (1.27)	31.5 (1.24)	46.5 (1.83)	141.4 (5.57)	135.7 (5.34)	205.5 (8.09)	216.8 (8.54)	226.0 (8.90)	282.9 (11.14)	258.4 (10.17)	158.3 (6.23)	1,768.9 (69.64)
Average rainy days (≥ 1.0 mm)	5	5	4	5	9	9	13	12	12	13	12	11	110
Average relative humidity (%)	82	79	75	72	72	72	75	76	77	79	81	83	77
Mean monthly sunshine hours	135.4	174.9	218.3	253.3	230.9	231.9	223.2	172.0	158.4	142.2	119.0	128.2	2,187.7
Source 1: PAGASA
Source 2: Deutscher Wetterdienst (sun, 1961–1990)

Tuguegarao experiences a tropical monsoon climate (Am), with only a slight difference between summer and winter temperatures, and high year-round humidity. The average maximum temperature during May is 96 °F (36 °C), one of the highest in the country.

On May 11, 1969, the highest temperature in the Philippines was recorded in Tuguegarao at 42.2 °C (108.0 °F), beating the previous record of 39.5 °C (103.1 °F) also measured in Tuguegarao in May 1912. Thus, the city was tagged as the "Hottest City in the Philippines". Unusually, in months—usually lasts from December to February—where the cool northeast monsoon or locally as amihan surges, temperatures in the city drop to as low as 15 °C (59 °F)—in 2017—especially in early mornings. Locals parallel the chills felt with that in Baguio.

== Demographics ==
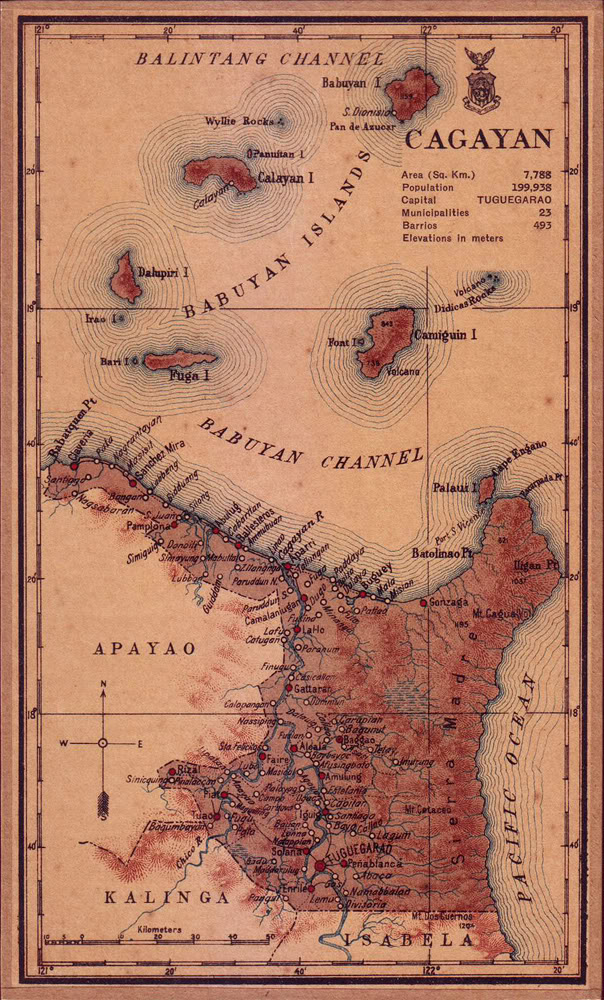
An old map of Cagayan used in the 1918 census. Tuguegarao, the provincial capital, is located at the bottom right of the map.

=== Population ===
In the 2024 census, the population of Tuguegarao was 167,297 people with a density of 1,200 inhabitants per square kilometre or 3,100 inhabitants per square mile. It is the most populous and densest city in the Cagayan Valley region. Most of the inhabitants are Ilocanos, Ibanags and Itawes. City's other residents include Kapampangans, Pangasinans, Tagalogs, Cebuanos, Hiligaynons, Maranaos, Maguindanaons and Tausugs—all of whom are not native in the city. Some are of Chinese and Indian descent.

Population census of Tuguegarao

Year	Pop.	±% p.a.
1903	16,105	—
1918	19,298	+1.21%
1939	27,643	+1.73%
1948	29,083	+0.57%
1960	43,074	+3.33%
1970	56,956	+2.83%

Year	Pop.	±% p.a.
1975	62,513	+1.88%
1980	73,507	+3.29%
1990	94,767	+2.57%
1995	107,275	+2.35%
2000	120,645	+2.55%
2007	129,539	+0.99%

Year	Pop.	±% p.a.
2010	138,865	+2.56%
2015	153,502	+1.93%
2020	166,334	+1.70%
2024	167,297	+0.14%

Source: Philippine Statistics Authority

=== Religion ===
Due to a history of Spanish and other foreign missions, Christianity, in the form of Roman Catholicism, is the predominant religion in Tuguegarao. The present Roman Catholic Archdiocese of Tuguegarao was chiseled from the Archdiocese of Nueva Segovia formerly located in Lal-lo (Nueva Segovia). It was initially created as a diocese on April 10, 1910, and elevated as an Archdiocese by Pope Paul VI on September 21, 1974. It has jurisdiction over suffragan bishops of Bayombong, Ilagan and Batanes.

The seat of the Roman Catholic Archdiocese is at St. Peter Metropolitan Cathedral, one of the largest churches in the region.

There are also Protestants, Baptist, Church of Christ, Adventists, Born Again groups, the Church of Jesus Christ of Latter-day Saints, Jehovah's Witnesses, and Philippine-based groups like the Iglesia Filipina Independiente, Iglesia ni Cristo and Members Church of God International that accounts to the city's population. These religious organizations have their own temples and churches sparsely located in the city. Some are Islam where their mosques are located at Centro 10 (Riverside) and Gosi Norte respectively.

== Economy ==
Poverty incidence of Tuguegarao (%)

Source: Philippine Statistics Authority

Within the past three decades, its economy gradually shifted from agriculture to trading, commerce and services. The shift was ushered by Tuguegarao's role as the Regional Government Center and Center of Commerce in Northern Luzon. In early 2016, Tuguegarao City was named as one of the ten emerging cities in the 2015 Next Wave Cities report, conducted by Department of Science and Technology - Information and Communications Technology Office (DOST-ICTO).

On June 30, 2020, the Department of Information and Communications Technology (DICT), in partnership with the IT and Business Process Association of the Philippines (IBPAP) and Leechiu Property Consultants (LPC), named Tuguegarao as one of the 25 "digital cities" poised to be prospect growth areas of the information technology and business process management (IT-BPM) sector in the country by 2025.

Currently, Tuguegarao has two major public markets, namely, the Don Domingo Public Market — located in the upper part of Poblacion serving as the convergence of agricultural and aquatic products from neighboring towns and provinces — and the Tuguegarao City Commercial Center — formerly known as Mall of the Valley and is located at the Central Business District, receiving the highest daily foot traffic.

Tuguegarao City recorded an annual regular income of ₱1,282,904,435 (approximately ₱1.28 billion) based on official Bureau of Local Government Finance (BLGF) reports. This revenue strength led to its official reclassification as a 2nd-class city. According to the Commission on Audit financial reports, Tuguegarao City recorded total assets of ₱3,744,065,734.93. Its fiscal capacity is anchored by robust local revenues and external allocations, supported by regular annual revenues exceeding ₱743 million and recent capital infusions like over ₱169 million in development funds.

Revenue Breakdown and Highlights:

- Locally Sourced Revenues (LSR): ₱380.55 million (2026) (representing vibrant local business taxes, real property taxes, and fees). According to the BLGF, Tuguegarao City ranks THIRD among all cities in Northern Luzon in terms of locally sourced revenues for the 1st quarter of CY 2026
- National Tax Allotment (NTA): ₱845.4 million (2026) (formerly Internal Revenue Allotment or IRA).
- Other Shares & Income: ₱119.6 million (2026) from national collections and interest.
- Regional Standing: Tuguegarao ranks among the top performing component cities in the Cagayan Valley region for local business generation and tax collections.

=== Retail and business process outsourcing ===
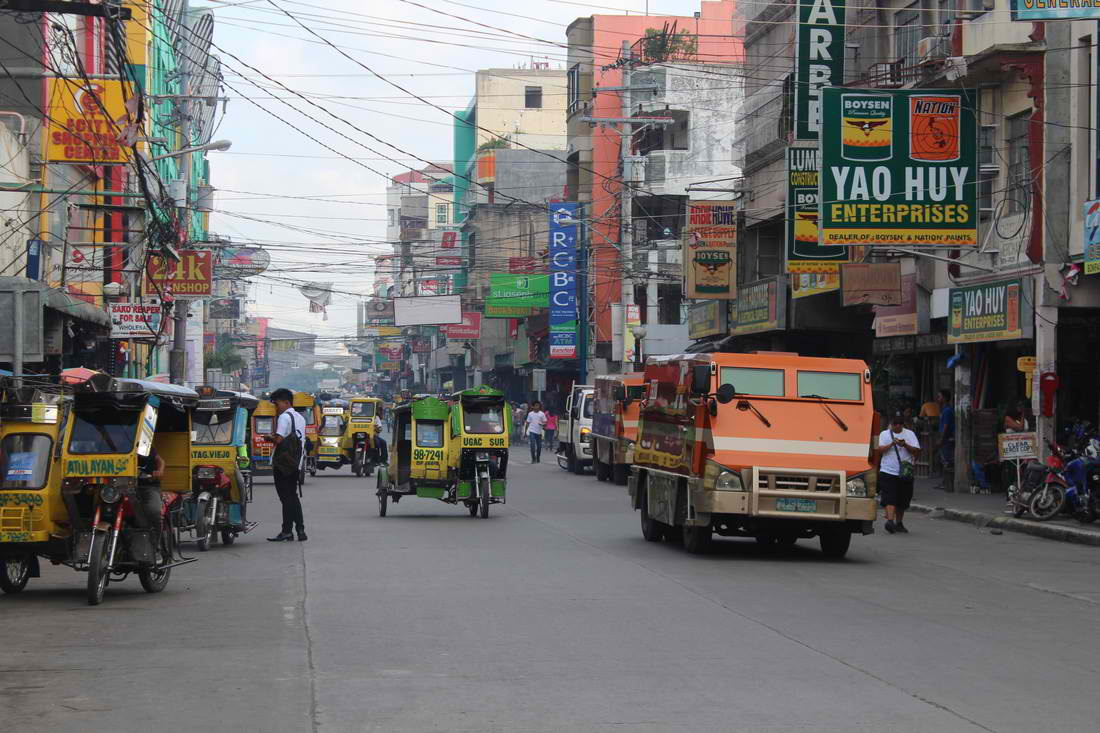
Bonifacio Street (formerly Calle Commercio) at the Central Business District

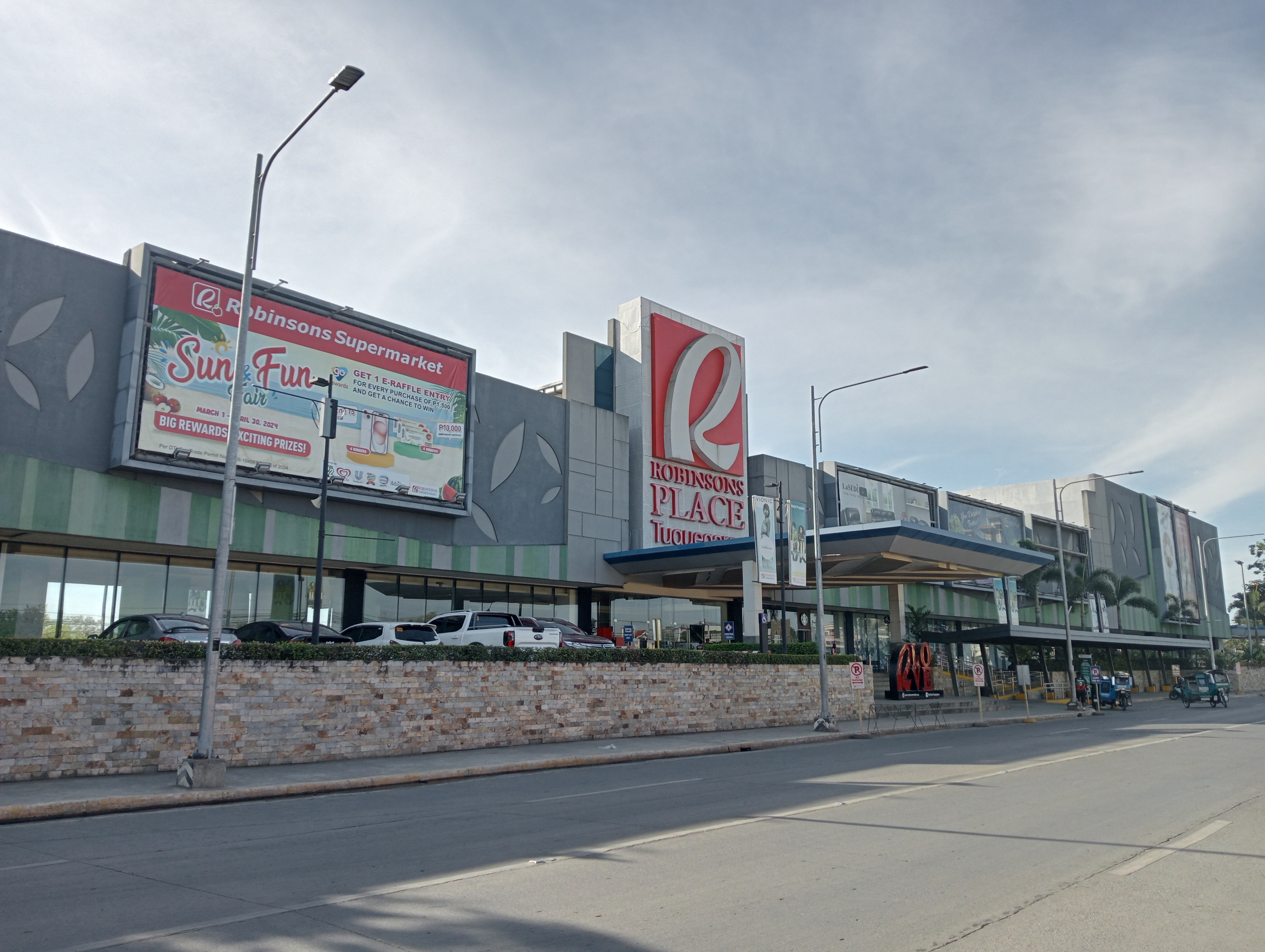
Robinsons Place Tuguegarao

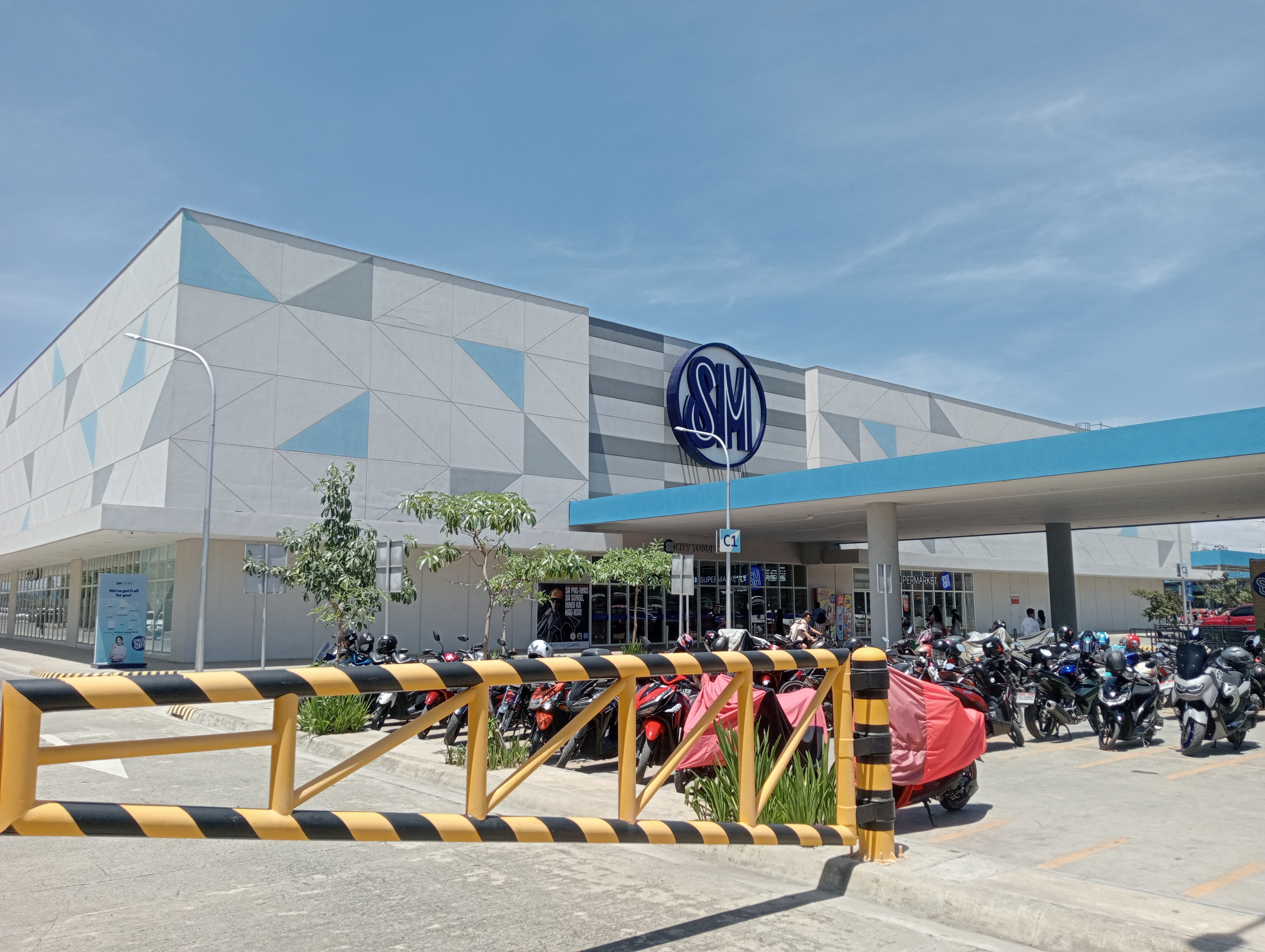
SM City Tuguegarao

Large retail operators have shown significant interest to the growth and increase of land value in cities throughout the Philippines. They are seen as highly developed urban centers where a lot of economic activities take place, and is important to urbanization and development. Tuguegarao is eyed as a center of exponential growth for commerce, industry and service, strengthening its stature as the capital of the Cagayan Valley Region.

SM Prime, the largest retail operator in the country, opened SM Center Tuguegarao Downtown on October 12, 2017, as its first mall in the city and in Cagayan. Its second mall, SM City Tuguegarao, opened on November 18, 2022, marketed as the largest mall in the Cagayan Valley Region.

On July 26, 2018, rival Robinsons Land Corporation opened the mixed-use complex shopping mall Robinsons Place Tuguegarao as the first full-service mall in Cagayan, including a Go Hotels branch, the first in the region. A few kilometers away is DoubleDragon Properties' CityMall Tuguegarao which opened on March 1, 2021, its first mall in the region.

Other notable shopping centers include the Tuguegarao City Commercial Center, formerly known as the Mall of the Valley; FCI Citimall, the first shopping mall in Northern Luzon; Brickstone Mall; Primark Town Center Tuguegarao, former site of Paseo Reale Mall; Unitop Mall Tuguegarao; Mart One Department Store and more.

Following the opening of 7 Eleven stores in Nueva Vizcaya, and Isabela provinces, the Philippine Seven Corporation expanded its reach to the Cagayan with its two branches in the city at College Avenue, near University of Cagayan Valley and at the new Valley Hotel Tower Mall in Balzain. There are currently more than eight branches of 7 Eleven stores as business expansion continues in the city.

The city has seen a significant growth of auto-hub companies with the presence of car showrooms in the city.

The City Government of Tuguegarao, through the city's Information and Communications Technology (ICT) Council hosted a meeting with IT-BPO companies Sitel Philippines Inc. and Lee Chiu Property Consultants, Inc. in September 2018 to discuss the possibilities of locating their companies in the city. Initial steps have been made for the establishment of an IT park and a township where BPO companies could locate.

=== Banking and real estate ===
Tuguegarao, as the seat of the regional capital of Cagayan Valley, houses the regional headquarters of the Bangko Sentral ng Pilipinas located at the Regional Government Center in Carig Sur. As of 2019, a total of 53 banks are operating in the city such as BPI, BDO, Chinabank, RCBC, EastWest, UnionBank, Robinsons Bank, PNB, Bank of Commerce, Landbank, UCPB, Philippine Postal Savings Bank and others.

Major real estate developers Ayala Land — Avida Settings Tuguegarao — and Vista Land — Camella Tuguegarao, Lessandra Cagayan and the expansion of Camella Cagayan (soon Camella Cagayan Trails) — are constructing their housing developments in Cagayan Valley. New condominiums developments are in the city these are Bayani Hall Lecaros, Bayani Hall Twin Towers developed by Vester Corporation and Rosevale Towers developed by Vista Estates.

The North Gateway Business Park is an 18-hectare (44-acre) mixed-use township development project located in Barangay Carig Sur, near the Regional Government Center. Launched on February 4, 2020, by real estate developer DataLand, it will feature a mixed-use superblock of retail shops, transport terminal, hotel and residential condominiums and a business park for BPO companies, financial institutions and major corporations. Nuciti by Vista Estates will become one of the future central business district of Tuguegarao spanning at 100-hectares of prime land currently it will house the Rosevale Towers, restaurants, cafes and in future developments it will feature commercial blocks, office buildings, meeting spaces, condotels, hotels, condominiums and commercial hubs.

=== Metro Tuguegarao ===
In May 2019, the National Economic and Development Authority Regional Development Council - Region 2 worked with consulting firms Pacific Rim Innovation and Management Exponents, Inc. (PRIMEX), Engineering and Development Corporation of the Philippines (EDCOP) and the Key Engineer Corporation to prepare a master plan for spurring economic growth in the Metro Tuguegarao zone. The metropolitan area, known as PIEST, includes the four municipalities of Peñablanca, Iguig, Enrile, Solana and the city of Tuguegarao. A situation analysis made by the consultative bodies found out that agriculture, water resource and tourism sectors were some of the "unutilized potentials" seen as key in the development of the area.

New developments are aimed to spread within the metro area with the construction of a new bridge linking Solana and Tuguegarao. When opened, this bridge will help decongest traffic in Buntun Bridge.

== Government ==
Tuguegarao City Hall, the principal workplace of the city government officials

=== Local government ===
As a component city and capital of the province of Cagayan, government officials in the provincial level are voted by the electorates of the city. The provincial government have political jurisdiction over local transactions of the city government.

Tuguegarao is governed by a city mayor, designated as local chief executive, and by a Sangguniang Panlungsod, composed of the vice mayor and the members of the Sangguniang Panlungsod, as the legislative body, in accordance with the Local Government Code. They are voted to office through an election, held every after three years. As a component city, the provincial government of Cagayan has political jurisdiction over local transactions of the city government.

Barangays are also headed by elected officials: Barangay Captain, Barangay Council, whose members are called Barangay Councilors. The barangays have SK federation which represents the barangay, headed by SK chairperson and whose members are called SK councilors. All officials are also elected every three years.

=== Elected Officials ===
Members Of 10th City Council (2025–2028)

Position	Name
City Vice Mayor	Rosauro Rodrigo G. Resuello
Councilors	Ma. Rosario B. Soriano
	Ronaldo S. Ortiz
	Mark Angelo B. Dayag
	Jude T. Bayona
	Dennis Ryan G. Avila
	Tirso V. Mangada
	Myrna G. Te
	Karina G. Viernes
	Lope B. Apostol, Jr.
	Marc Aldous C. Baccay
ABC President	Restituto C. Ramirez (Ex-officio)
SK Federation	Cerene Pearl T. Quilang (Ex-officio)

=== Political history ===
Following the American occupation in December 1899, Tuguegarao transitioned into a center for American-style civil governance. This period saw the construction of the first Provincial Capitol (1909) and the Town Hall under the leadership of municipal presidents like Don Antonio Soriano and Don Honorio Lasam.

During World War II, the town was occupied by Japanese forces on December 12, 1941. A puppet administration was established with Domingo Gosiengfiao as Mayor. The town was liberated by Allied forces on June 25, 1945, after which the Philippine Commonwealth government was restored.

In the post-war years, Tuguegarao saw the rise of elected local leaders such as Dr. Venancio del Rosario, Sr. (1947). In 1975, the city’s political stature was further elevated when it was designated as the Regional Center of Cagayan Valley (Region II) by President Ferdinand Marcos.

The late 1980s marked the beginning of the Ting era, when Delfin Telan Ting was elected municipal mayor in 1988. His administration focused on urban expansion and infrastructure, setting the stage for the cityhood movement that would define the next decade. Tuguegarao officially became a component city via Republic Act No. 8755, ratified in a plebiscite on December 18, 1999.

==== Ting-Soriano Rivalry ====
Randolph Ting (1999–2007) and his father Delfin Ting (2007–2013) maintained a 25-year hold on power. Their leadership was noted for commercial growth but also criticized for a "kamay na bakal" (iron fist) approach and legal issues surrounding land acquisitions.

In 2013, retired police general Jefferson Soriano broke the Ting's streak. His tenure was defined by numerous administrative suspensions related to graft cases and unauthorized permits, leading to a "revolving door" leadership with Vice Mayor Bienvenido de Guzman II.

In 2022, Maila Rosario Ting-Que (daughter of Delfin) reclaimed the seat, becoming the city's first female mayor. Her administration has balanced legacy politics with modern scrutiny, including public debates over disaster response priorities.

=== Chronology of executive leadership (Post-1900) ===
Era	Leadership Title	Notable Figure(s)
1900s–1930s	Municipal Presidents	Don Antonio Soriano, Don Honorio Lasam
1942–1945	Japanese Occupation	Domingo Gosiengfiao
1947–1980s	Municipal Mayors	Venancio del Rosario, Sr., Faustino Dy (acting)
1988–1999	Municipal Mayor	Delfin T. Ting
1999–2007	First City Mayor	Randolph S. Ting
2007–2013	Second City Mayor	Delfin T. Ting
2013–2022	Third City Mayor	Jefferson P. Soriano
2022–Present	Fourth City Mayor	Maila Rosario S. Ting-Que

== Culture ==
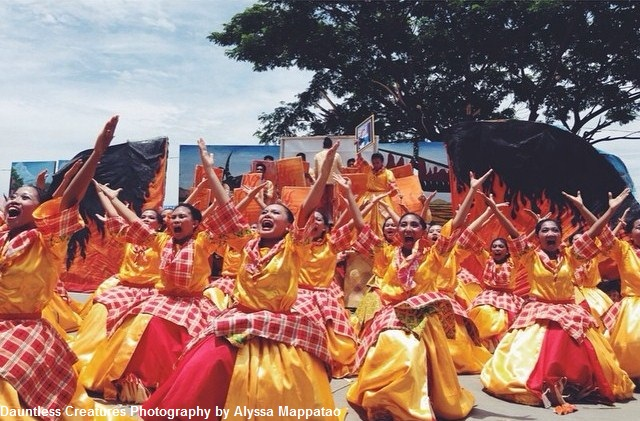
Street dancing competition during the Afi festival at the Cagayan Provincial Capitol

The Pavvurulun Afi Festival is an annual festival every August, celebrated in commemoration of the city's patron saint, San Jacinto de Polonia whose feast day falls on August 16. It came from the Ybanag word afi, meaning fire.

The concept of the "Afi" started in 2014 which reaffirms the city's origins based on popular legend that the current city center was once “a wilderness that was cleared by fire.” The main event of the celebration is its opening day, where thousands of students convene for a field demonstration at night as torchbearers. In 2017, 3500 students from Cagayan National High School and Cagayan State University - College of Human Kinetics danced with torches at the sports complex. The city is attempting to beat Indonesia's world record of 3,777 torchbearers in the festival's next edition.

Other highlights of the weeklong celebration include the street dancing and drum and lyre competitions, participated by elementary and secondary schools in the city, clad in their vibrant costumes and props. Both are usually held at the city's central business district on Bonifacio Street (Calle Commercio). Other events include the Bangkarera—a rowing competition in two categories which aims to promote sustainable fishing along the Pinacanauan River, which flows to the Cagayan River—pansit festival featuring a pansit-eating and pansit-cook off contests, Nuang Karera (Carabao race), Kabayu Karera (horse race), among others.

The predecessor to this was the Maskota Festival, an ode to the Maskota which is called the "Dance of Lovemaking." It is a wedding dance prevalent in the provinces of Cagayan and Isabela characterized by "spontaneous, lively and extravagantly expressive" movements, danced to the rhythm of the verso with the sincosinco accompaniment. In the olden days, indigenous materials were utilized for the costumes ranging from local harvests of coconut sprouts, betel nuts, to corn leaves and atchuetes as natural dye.

Pancit Batil Potun, widely known as Pancit Batil Patung, is a popular local noodle dish which directly translates to "pancit, beaten egg soup and egg on top." Several panciterias mushroom in all the city's corners, each with distinct styles of cooking and ingredients—miki, egg, minced carabao meat, vegetables and other specific toppings of choice. The city is also known for its own version of longganisa characterized with its salty and garlicky taste with variations using either pork or carabao meat.

== Tourism ==
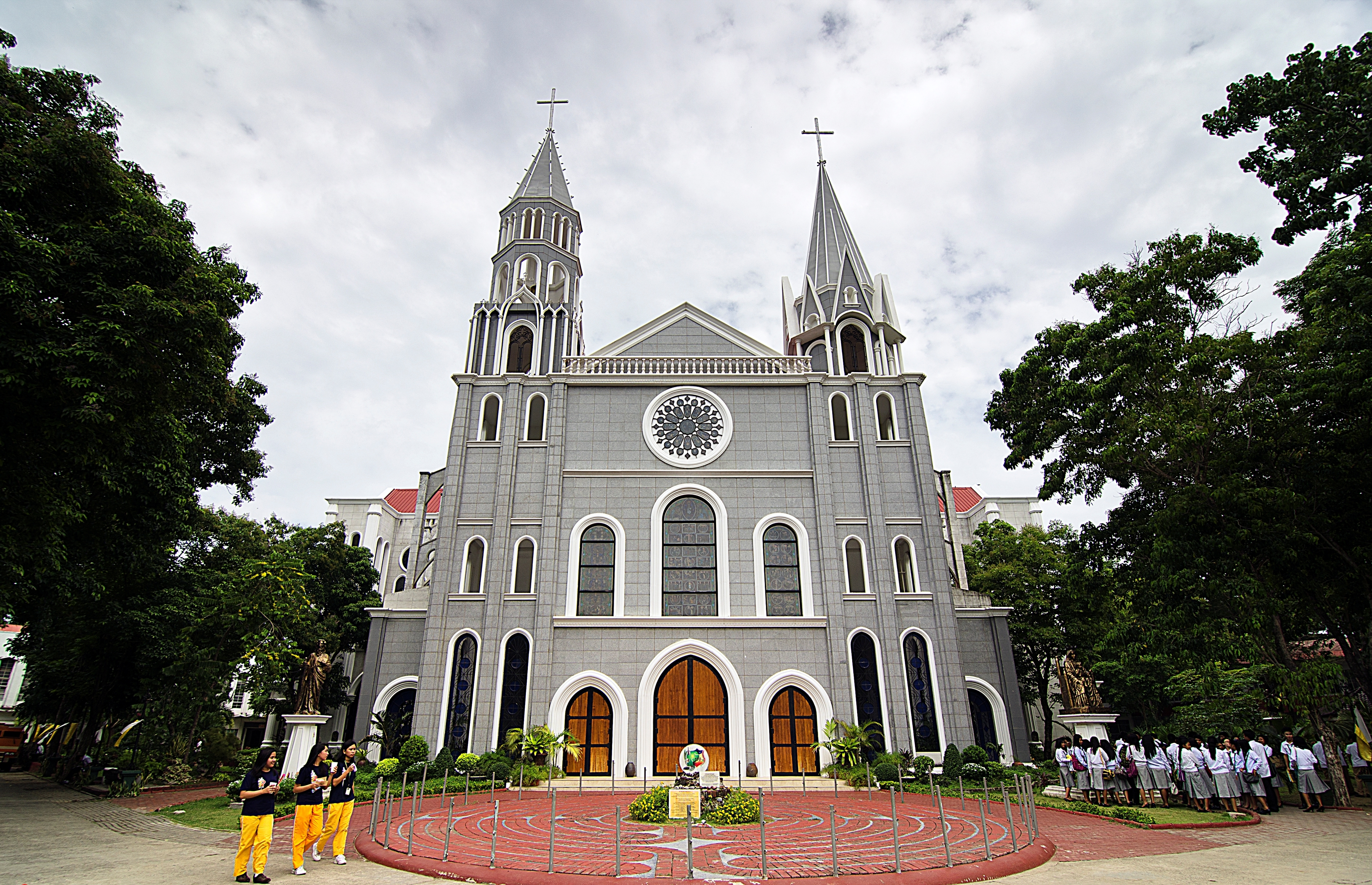
Our Lady of Chartres Chapel in St. Paul University Philippines

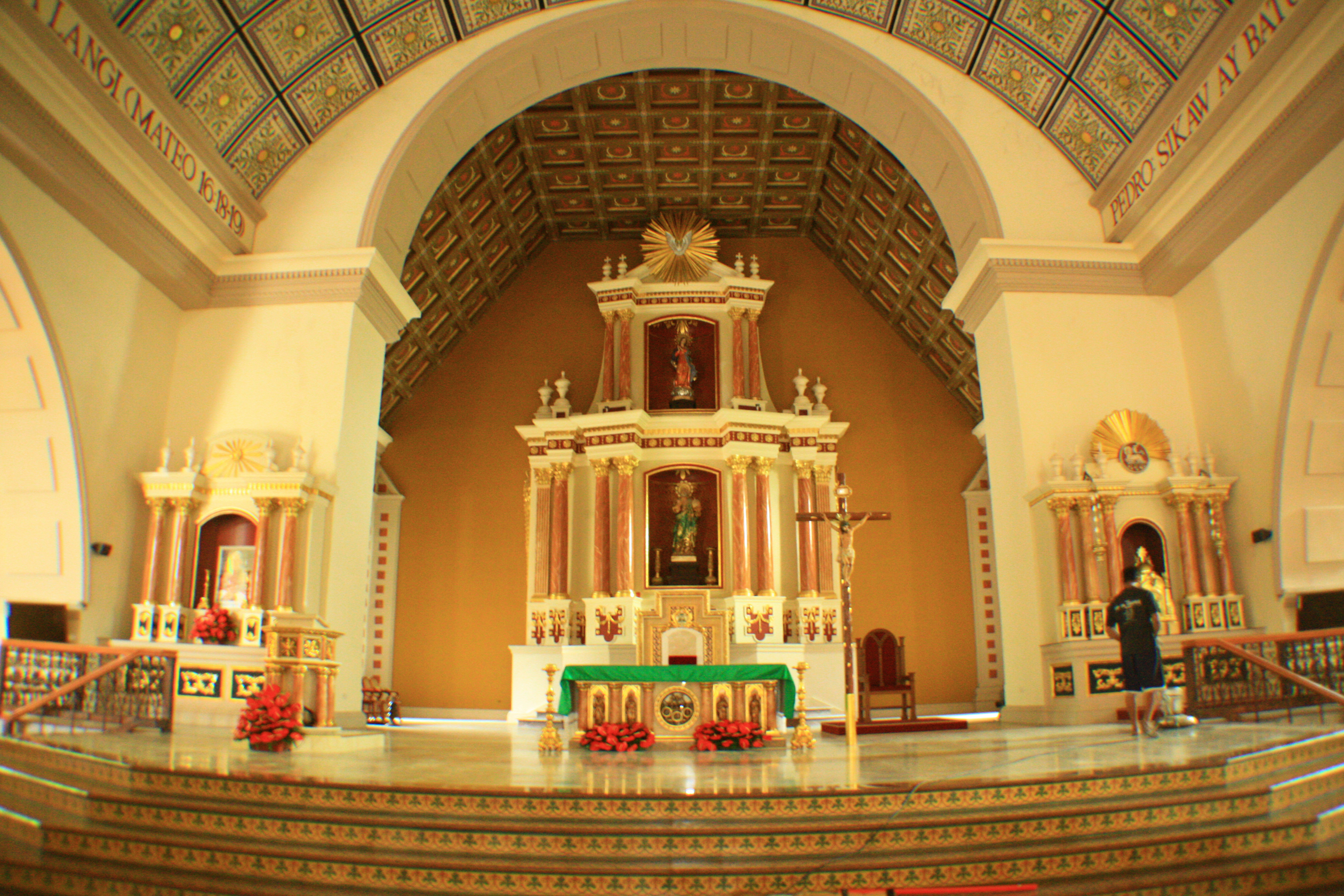
Main altarpiece of St. Peter Metropolitan Cathedral

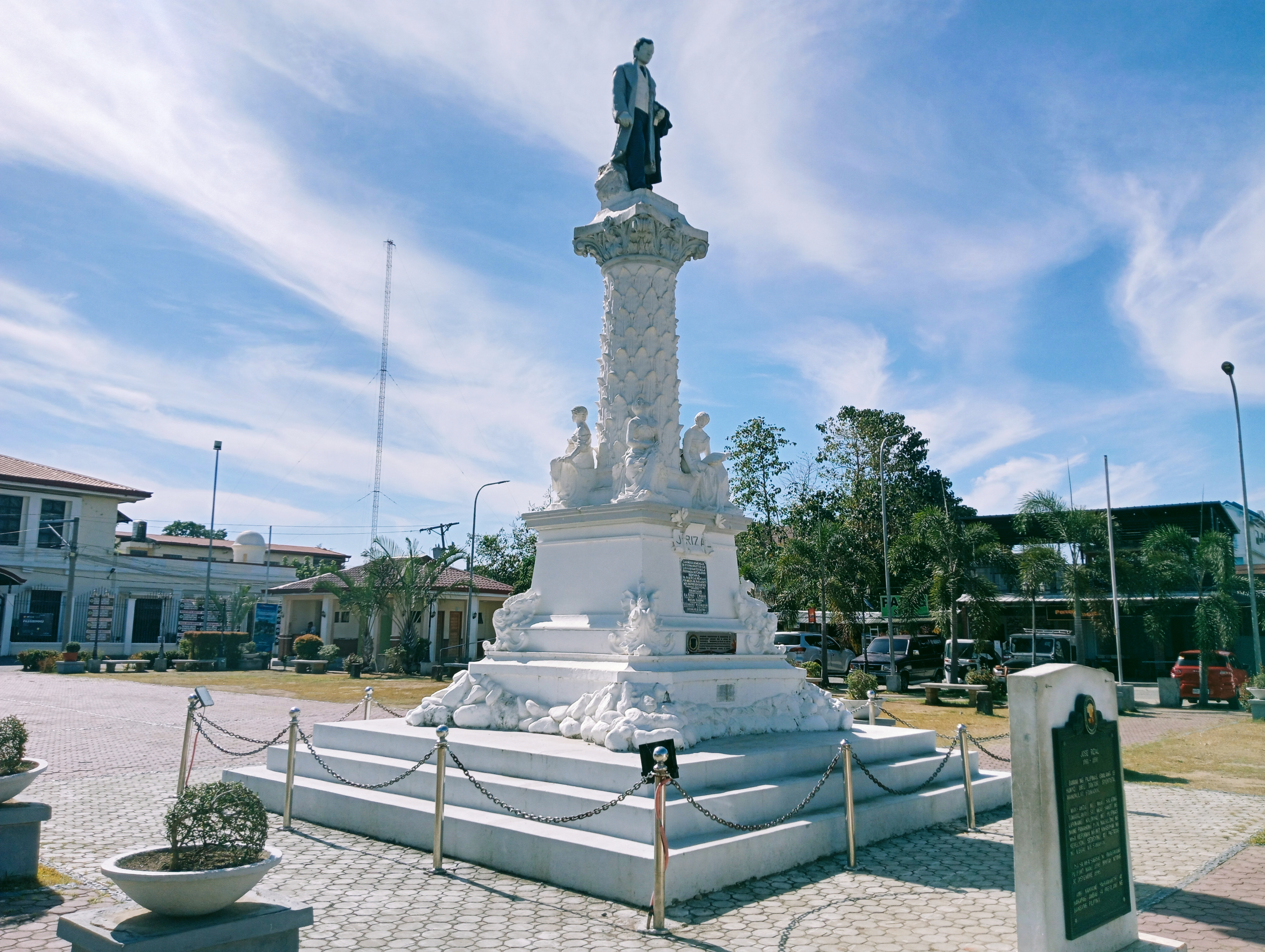
Rizal Park

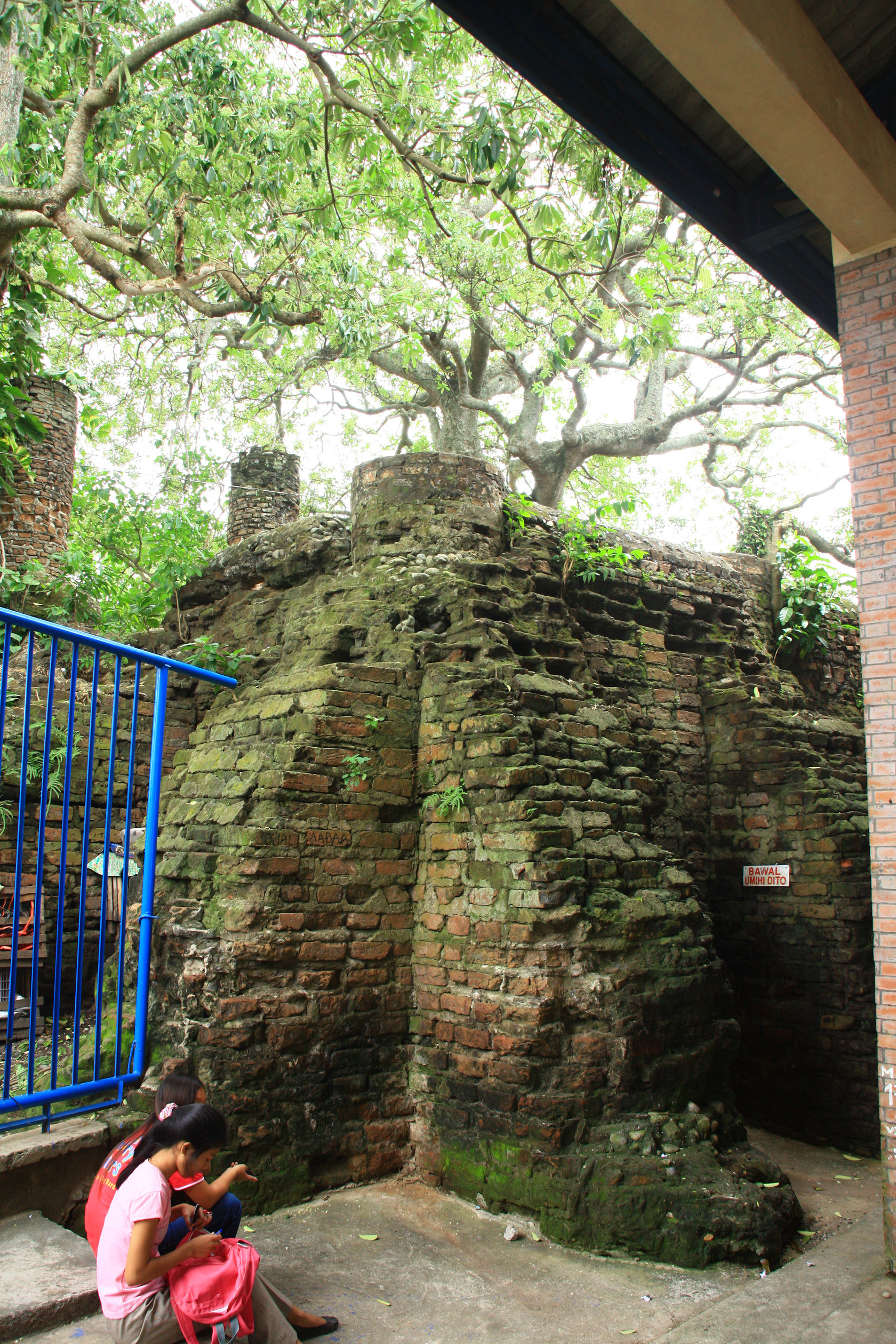
Horno ruins in Bagumbayan

The Cagayan Museum and Historical Research Center houses an extensive collection of various artifacts and antiques of the province. In addition to animal fossils found in the valley, it houses extensive data on the discovery of Callao Man by the National Museum. Formerly located in the Cagayan Provincial Capitol Complex, it has moved to the renovated historic provincial jail known as Tribunal de Tuguegarao. In front of the provincial museum are the refurbished century-old Rizal Park and Tuguegarao East Central School, the city's former municipio from the Spanish era until its conversion to a public elementary school in 1960.

Tuguegarao boasts elaborate Spanish-built churches such as the Ermita de Piedra de San Jacinto, known to locals as the San Jacinto Church, which houses the city's patron saint. It is an elevated chapel built by Dominican friars in 1604 regarded as the oldest brick structure in the city. The St. Peter Metropolitan Cathedral is the biggest Spanish colonial church in Cagayan Valley which was construction from 1761 to 1767 under the supervision of Fr. Antonio Lobato, OP. It is the seat of the Archdiocese of Tuguegarao. Both churches underwent reconstruction due to damages brought by World War II.

Located in Barangay Centro 09, often called Bagumbayan by locals, is the Horno ruins, a Spanish-era brick kiln used to fire bricks for colonial structures including those in the Cathedral and San Jacinto Church.

St. Paul University Philippines was founded in 1907 as Colegio de San Pablo with the arrival of the Sisters of St. Paul of Chartres in Cagayan Valley. It served as a military garrison and hospital of the Japanese during the World War. Throughout the years, it has since become identified internationally having been the first private university in the Philippines to be ISO 9001 certified in 2000 by TÜV Rheinland. One of the most recognizable structures in the campus is the Our Lady of Chartres Chapel, reminiscent of French Gothic architecture, which was inaugurated during the university's centenary celebration.

South of the city is the Buntun Bridge, one of the longest bridges in the country spanning 1.369 km (0.851 miles) across the Cagayan River, the longest and largest river in the Philippines. Construction began in 1960 and was opened to traffic in 1969, linking the city to the second and third district municipalities of Cagayan and Apayao.

While tourist spots are sparse in the city, it has become the usual jump-off point of tourists to other destinations in the province such as the Callao Cave and Calvary Hills in neighboring towns Peñablanca and Iguig, respectively.

== Infrastructure ==
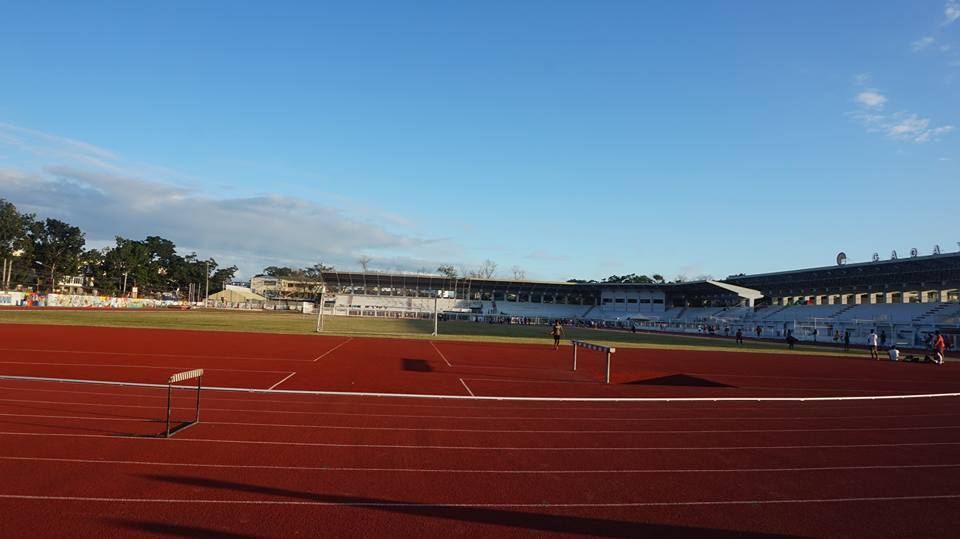
Cagayan Sports Complex

The city hosts a number of event centers—such as the Cagayan Sports Complex, Tuguegarao City Peoples' Gymnasium and the Cagayan Coliseum—thereby allowing it to host provincial and regional conventions and related gatherings.

The water system of Tuguegarao is administered by the Metropolitan Tuguegarao Water District, which also serves the nearby municipalities such as Iguig and Solana. Meanwhile, electric services are provided by Cagayan Electric Cooperative which has its office in Solana, Cagayan. Telecommunication services are primarily offered by huge telephone companies such as PLDT and Bayantel, while mobile services are handled by Globe Telecom, Smart Communications, Dito Telecommunity, Sun Cellular, Touch Mobile, and Talk N' Text. High-speed DSL and optical Internet subscriptions are offered by RBC Cable, PLDT and Globe Telecom.

Tuguegarao houses the headquarters of the Philippine National Police for Cagayan Valley, located in Camp Marcelo A. Adduru at Alimannao Hills. As the region's institutional center, it is home to the majority of regional government offices, which are concentrated in the Regional Government Center at Barangay Carig Sur.

== Transportation ==
Transportation and infrastructure play a major role in sustaining Tuguegarao's economy and supporting nearby towns. As the city grows, its daytime population has increased, with residents commuting for commerce, work, and notably education—thanks to its reputation for housing several academic institutions. Over the years, Tuguegarao has evolved and expanded, and its transportation network has grown to keep up with the increasing demand for easily accessible, reliable, and flexible transit options.

=== Air ===
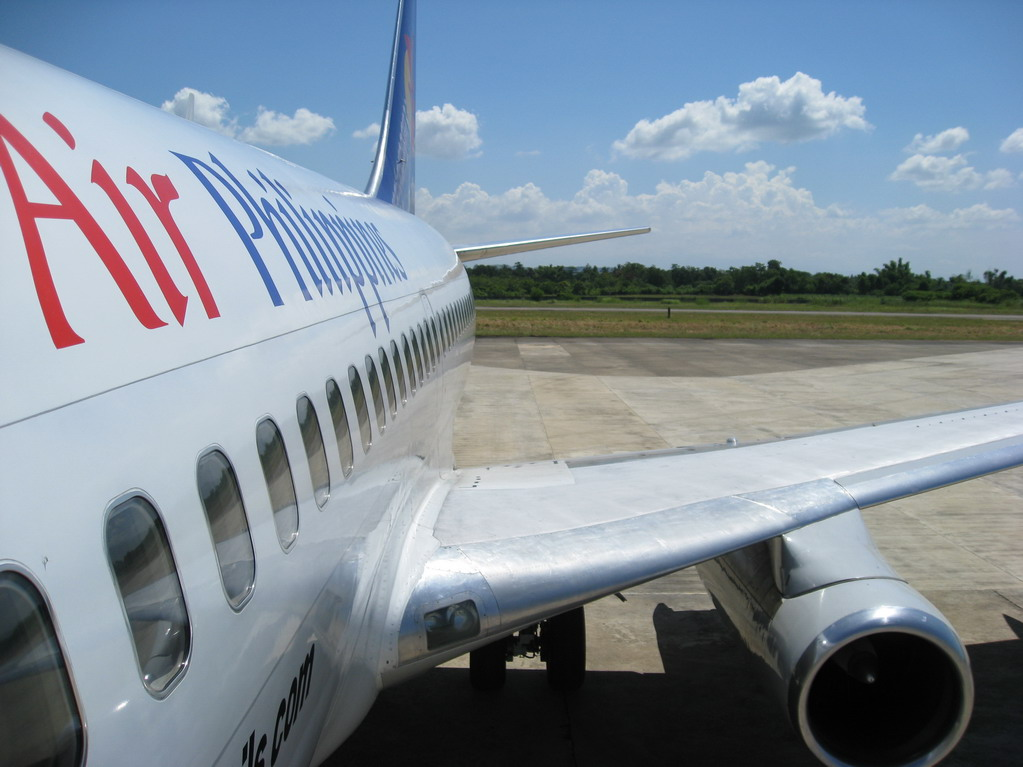
An Air Philippines plane at the Tuguegarao Airport

The Tuguegarao Airport handles domestic flights within the Philippines and serves the general area of Tuguegarao and its surrounding municipalities, capable of handling Boeing-737-sized aircraft. It is one of the top 20 busiest airports in the country and classified by the Civil Aviation Authority of the Philippines as a Principal Class 1 domestic airport. Cebu Pacific, Sky Pasada and PAL Express are the domestic airlines which operate routes to and from the city. As of 2017, the airport is undergoing rehabilitation and expansion consisting of terminal upgrades and widening of runway, for night landing capabilities, and taxiway.

A proposed international airport, serving the Cagayan Valley Region, will be constructed at the eastern portion of the city—somewhere in barangays Dadda or Tagga—as suggested by City Mayor Bienvenido de Guzman II and former mayor Atty. Jefferson Soriano. Originally, as proposed by the Cagayan Governor Manuel Mamba, the airport was to be located at the tri-boundary area of Tuao, Piat and Solana towns but was later shelved after a forum.

=== Land ===
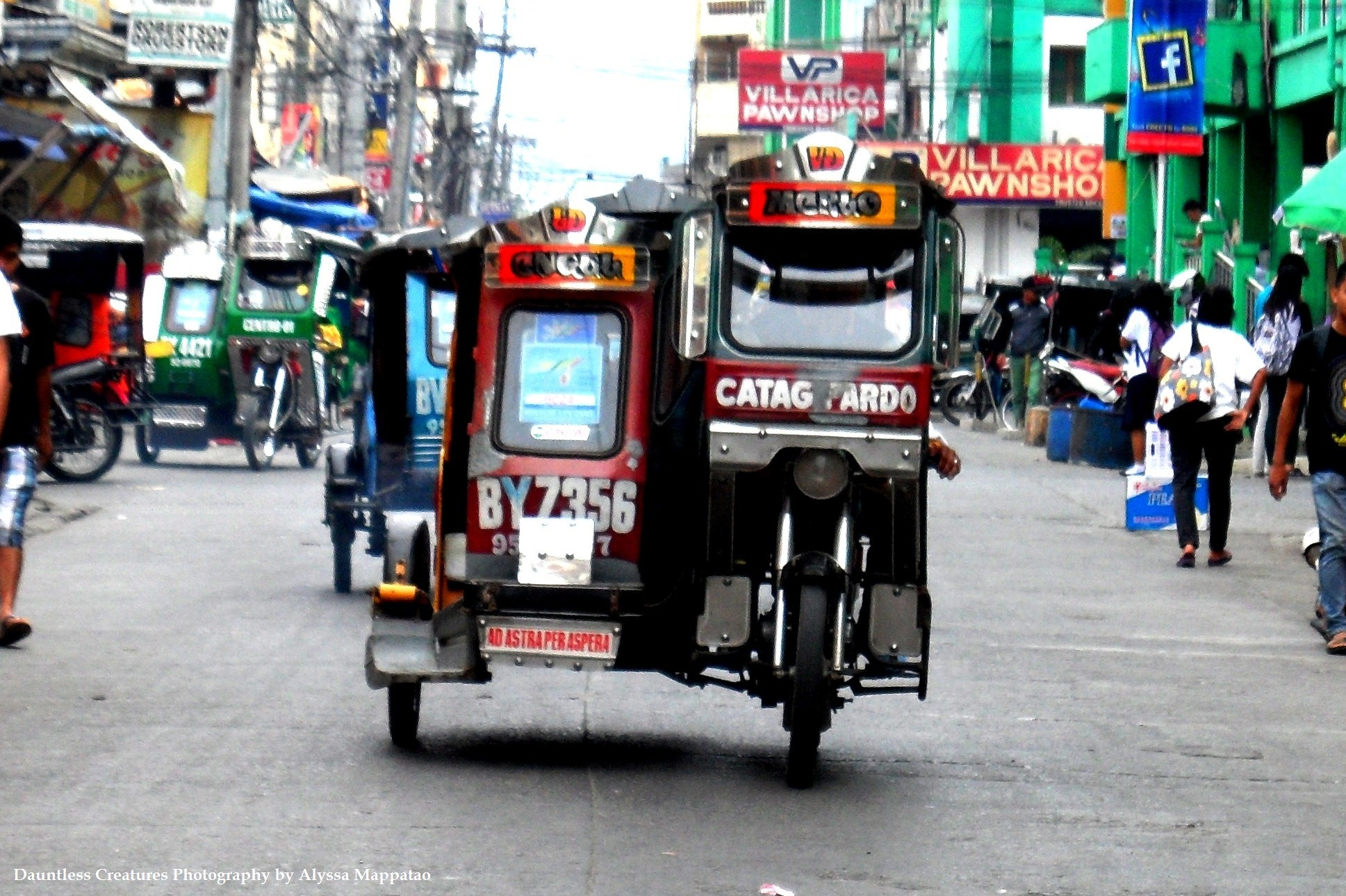
The tricycle, Tuguegarao's primary public transit vehicle

A cultural icon of the Philippines with a design, Tuguegarao's tricycles offered vehicle for hire for small groups of passengers on a common route over short distances.

Tuguegarao also serves as a vital hub for local, regional and national transportation. Buses operate regional routes from Tuguegarao to Baggao, Aparri, Santiago, Baguio, and many neighboring cities, towns and municipalities. It also is an end-of-the-line stop for many coaches running inter-city and national routes mostly coming from Metro Manila such as GV Florida, Victory Liner, Dalin Bus Liner, Five Star, and First North Luzon Transit.

To the east side are UV Express vans that ply north and south towards Claveria, Santa Praxedes, Aparri, Santa Ana, Alcala, Lasam and Junction Luna, Abulug in Cagayan, Santiago, Roxas, Ilagan and Cauayan in Isabela, Luna and Kabugao in Apayao. There are also mini buses plying to Lasam, Allacapan, Claveria, Santiago and Roxas. To the west are jeepneys with routes to Iguig, Tuao, Enrile, Tabuk and Rizal in Kalinga and some mountainous and inland barrios including Callao, all of which lie on the western side of the river.

Kalesas run within the city, mostly near popular points of interest, and are part of the city's tourism but most of these are limited within the downtown area. Taxis are the newest mode of public transportation which are routed from the city to any point in Region 2.

==== Main roads ====
Regional transport in Tuguegarao is vulnerable given its lack of distribution of arterial roads and inadequate traffic engineering planning and discipline.

- The Buntun Highway-Luna Street network is a major four-lane road network of Tuguegarao that forms part of National Route 51 (N51). It is the only road that serves west-side traffic to Tuguegarao. It links Tuguegarao to the western side of the Cagayan River via the Buntun Bridge, further towns from the west side most notably the municipalities of Solana and Enrile, the Philippine highway network and the Santiago-Tuguegarao Road.
- The Balzain Highway-Cagayan Valley Road is another major four-lane road network of Tuguegarao, part of Cagayan Valley Road that comes through Balzain and Carig, that forms part of the Asian Highway 26. It is the only road that serves north-bound traffic to Tuguegarao coming from the east side of the Cagayan River and most of Cagayan Valley. It also links Tuguegarao to surrounding municipalities, most notably Iguig and Peñablanca. These two main arterial networks serves as the backbone for the majority of Tuguegarao's internal and inter-regional transportation.
- The Tuguegarao City West Diversion Road is an 8.99 km (6 mi) four-lane road under construction which starts from Barangay Carig traversing Barangays Linao, Atulayan, Bagay and Buntun, aiming to decongest the Tuguegarao highway and provide alternative routes to nearby municipalities like Solana. The road project is divided into four phases expected to be completed by 2022.

== Healthcare ==
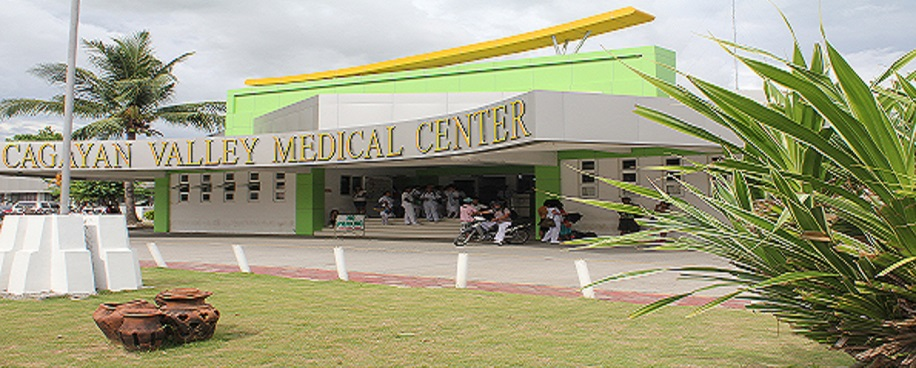
Cagayan Valley Medical Center

Being the regional center, Tuguegarao hosts major hospitals which serve people in the Cagayan Valley region. Cagayan Valley Medical Center, the largest medical facility in the Cagayan Valley with a bed capacity of 500, is situated in the city. The largest privately owned facility in the region is the 250-bed Dr. Ronald P. Guzman Medical Center, a tertiary level hospital. St. Paul University Philippines has an affiliate hospital in Tuguegarao, the St. Paul Hospital. Cagayan's oldest existing private hospital, the Dr. Domingo S. De Leon General Hospital, formerly Clinica De Leon, is also situated in the city.

Other hospitals in the city are the government-owned and run Tuguegarao City People's General Hospital and the Holy Infant Hospital as well as the privately owned Divine Mercy Wellness Center.

== Education ==
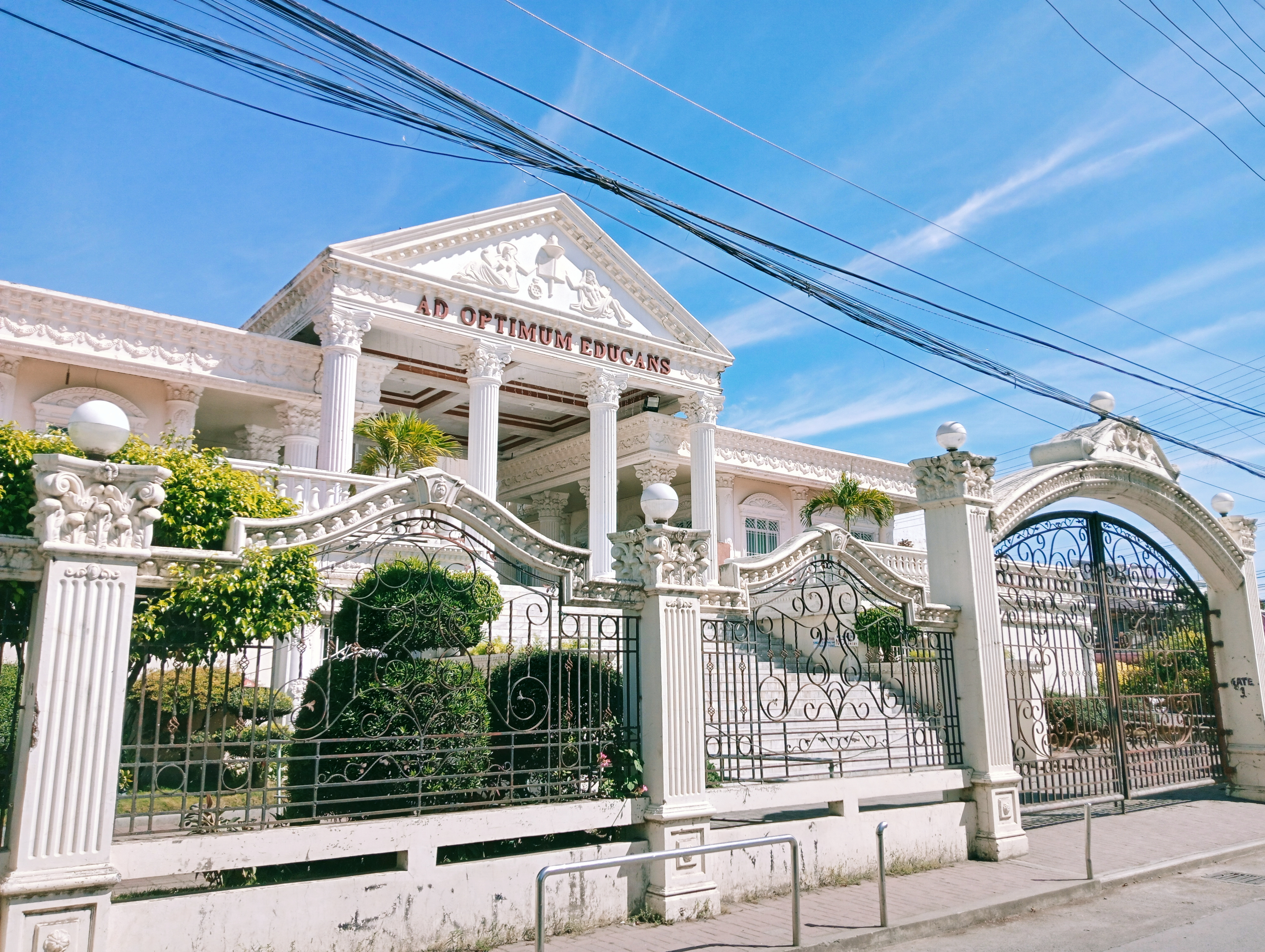
Cagayan State University — Andrews Campus

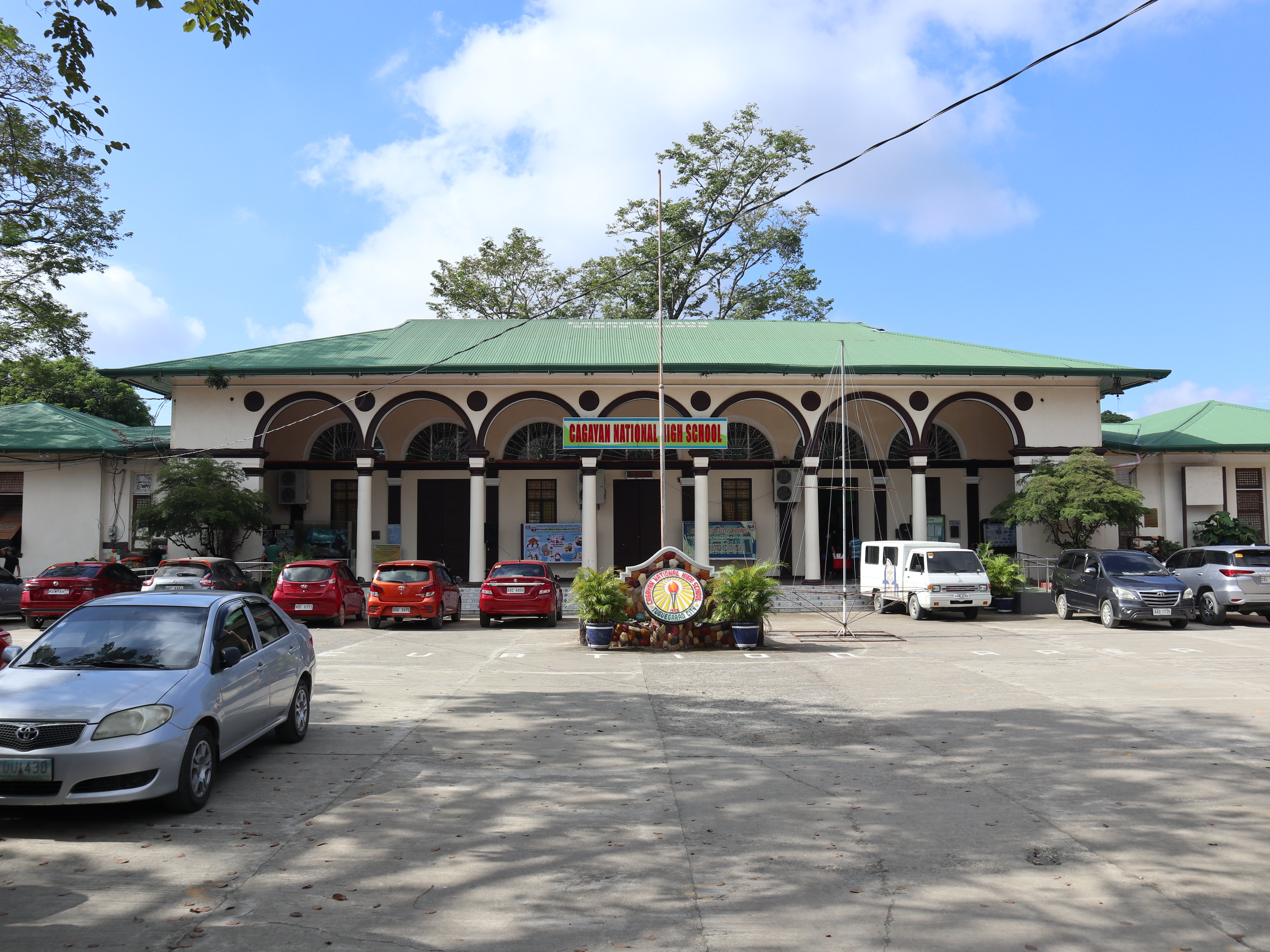
Cagayan National High School

Due to its high incidence of universities, Tuguegarao has been dubbed as the Center of Education in Cagayan Valley. It is home to prestigious and internationally recognized schools such as St. Paul University Philippines—the main campus of the St. Paul University System—and the University of Saint Louis Tuguegarao—one of the CICM schools. The latter was the successor of the Ateneo de Tuguegarao, the country's fifth Ateneo ran by the Society of Jesus, established in 1945 but eventually closed in 1962 following the Jesuit exodus.

Two of the top state universities are also in Tuguegarao City—the CSU Athena (Andrews Campus), and CSU Red Eagle (Carig Campus)—producing national topnotchers in board examinations. Both universities have their own administration and are separated from each other.

Other schools in the city include the University of Cagayan Valley, John Wesley College, Medical Colleges of Northern Philippines - International School of Asia and Pacific, F.L. Vargas College, Maila Rosario College, Credo Domine College, City Technological Institute, Cagayan Metropolitan Institute of Technology, STI College, AMA Computer College, and other educational institutions. Proposals have also been unveiled for the establishment of a National University campus (possibly within the SM City complex), majorly owned and ran by SM Group.

The Technical Education and Skills Development Authority (TESDA) was established through the enactment of the Technical Education and Skills Development Act of 1994, which encourages the full participation of and mobilize the industry, labor, local government units, and technical-vocational institutions in the skills development of the country's human resource. The TESDA complex and facilities are located in Carig Norte. Numerous technological and vocational institutes can also be found in the city.

Tuguegarao has one Jesuit educational institution located along Bagay Road—the Global Reformed University.

Other notable schools in the city include Cagayan National High School—the oldest and biggest secondary school in the region in terms of student population—Tuguegarao City Science High School, a state-owned secondary institution—Ke Bing School, a private Chinese school—Methodist Christian School, a Christian school in Central Business District—and Saint Claire Montesorri, a catholic school in San Gabriel. The state-owned secondary institution of Tuguegarao City West High School started operations on June 4, 2012.

Students from different countries like China, Congo, India, Nepal, Nigeria, Pakistan and South Korea come to study at the city's universities. Most of the students come to study undergraduate and graduate degrees in sciences.

== Media ==
Metro Tuguegarao is home to regional broadcasting stations and television networks. Sixteen radio broadcasting stations (5 AM and 11 FM stations), at least fourteen local newspapers and four cable television companies operates in the city.

=== TV stations ===
- ABS-CBN ALL TV Tuguegarao (Analog Channel 3 & Digital Channel 35)
- GMA Tuguegarao (Analog Channel 7 & Digital Channel 29)
- RPTV Tuguegarao (Digital Channel 45)
- PTV Tuguegarao (Digital Channel 30)
- IBC Tuguegarao (Digital Channel 17)
- A2Z Tuguegarao (Digital Channel 20)
- GTV Tuguegarao (Analog Channel 27 & Digital Channel 29)
- TV5 Tuguegarao (Analog Channel 39 & Digital Channel 18)
- GNN Tuguegarao (Digital Channel 43)
- Net 25 Tuguegarao (Digital Channel 47)
- One Sports Tuguegarao (Analog Channel 49 & Digital Channel 18)
- The Northern Forum - Cagayan Valley

=== Cable & satellite TV ===
- RBC Cable Master System (Branches in Peñablanca, Iguig, Enrile, Solana and Tuguegarao)
- Royal Cable Corporation (The first Cable TV and Internet provider; and was formerly Clearview Cable TV System) (Branches in Amulung, Baggao, Gattaran, Iguig, Peñablanca and Tuguegarao)
- Cignal TV
- Sky Direct

=== Radio ===
AM Stations:

- DZRH Nationwide 576 (DZHR; MBC Media Group)
- DZCV 684 Radyo Sanggunian (DZCV; Filipinas Broadcasting Network)
- DWPE Radyo Pilipinas 729 (DWPE; Presidential Broadcast Service)
- DZYT Sonshine Radio 765 (DZYT; Sonshine Media Network International)
- DZGR Bombo Radyo 891 (DZGR; People's Broadcasting Service)

FM Stations:

- 87.7 iFM (Radio Mindanao Network)
- Barangay LS 89.3 (DWWQ; GMA Network, Inc.)
- 91.7 Magik FM (DWCN; Century Broadcasting Network)
- 92.5 Brigada News FM (DWVX; Brigada Mass Media Corporation/Baycomms Broadcasting Corporation)
- 94.1 Love Radio (DWMN; MBC Media Group)
- 95.7 XFM (Palawan Broadcasting Corporation/Y2H Broadcasting Network, Inc.)
- 96.5 RJ FM (DWRJ; Relay station of RJ FM 100.3 Manila by Rajah Broadcasting Network)
- 100.5 Big Sound FM (DWXY; Vanguard Radio Network)
- 101.5 Radio Maria Cagayan (DZRD; Radio Maria Philippines)
- 104.5 K5 News FM (5K Broadcasting Network/Apollo Broadcast Investors)
- DZDA Radyo Pangkaunlaran 105.3 Cagayan (DZDA; Department of Agriculture & Philippine Broadcasting Service)

== Domestic Sister and Partner Cities ==
- San Juan City, Metro Manila, Philippines
- Tabuk City, Kalinga, Philippines

== International Friend Cities and Partnerships ==
- Huzhou City, Zhejiang Province, People's Republic of China

== Notable personalities ==
=== Entertainment ===
- Ralph Guzman, broadcaster and journalist
- Manolo Favis, veteran radio broadcaster and media personality
- Orestes Ojeda, actor
- Lilia Cuntapay, actress dubbed as the "Queen of Philippine Horror Movies"
- Lucho Ayala, television and film actor

=== Military ===
- Marcelo Adduru, former soldier and politician
- Eulogio Balao, former soldier and politician
- Noel Coballes, retired lieutenant general and Commanding General of the Philippine Army (2013–2014)
- Benito T. de Leon, retired AFP military officer
- Robert Empedrad, retired Admiral and former Flag Officer in Command of the Philippine Navy

=== Law & Government ===
- Silvino Barsana Agudo, lawyer and politician
- Ramon Paul Hernando, Associate Justice of the Supreme Court of the Philippines
- Randolph Ting, former Mayor of Tuguegarao and former Deputy Speaker of the House of Representatives

=== Religion ===
- Ricardo Baccay, Archbishop-elect of the Archdiocese of Tuguegarao, former third bishop of the Diocese of Alaminos, and former auxiliary Bishop of the Archdiocese of Tuguegarao.

=== Sports ===
- Rommel Adducul, former professional basketball player and coach
- Philip Butel, Caloocan Supremos basketball player
- Rachelle Anne Cabral, archer in the 2012 Summer Olympics
- Charo Soriano, a founder of Beach Volleyball Republic and a former Ateneo Lady Eagle

Preceded by Lal-lo	Capital of Cagayan; 1839–present	Incumbent
