= DWMN =

Radio station in Tuguegarao, Philippines

Love Radio Tuguegarao (DWMN)
- Tuguegarao; Philippines
- Broadcast area: Cagayan and surrounding areas
- Frequency: 94.1 MHz
- Branding: 94.1 Love Radio

Programming
- Languages: Ibanag, Filipino
- Format: Contemporary MOR, OPM
- Network: Love Radio

Ownership
- Owner: MBC Media Group
- Sister stations: DZRH Tuguegarao

History
- First air date: January 7, 2008
- Call sign meaning: Manila

Technical information
- Licensing authority: NTC
- Power: 10,000 watts
- ERP: 21,000 watts

Links
- Webcast: Listen Live
- Website: Love Radio Tuguegarao

DWMN (94.1 FM), broadcasting as 94.1 Love Radio, is a radio station owned and operated by MBC Media Group. Its studio and transmitter is located at the 3rd Floor, Sam's Place, Caritan Centro, Tuguegarao.
