= List of highways numbered 51 =

The following highways are numbered 51:

== Australia ==
- Kamilaroi Highway
- Plenty Road

== Cambodia ==
- National Road 51 (Cambodia)

== Canada ==
- Alberta Highway 51 (defunct)
- Saskatchewan Highway 51

== Cuba ==
- Caimito–Salado Road (2–51)

== Finland ==
- Finnish national road 51

== France ==
- A51 autoroute

== Greece ==
- EO51 road

== Hungary ==
- M51 expressway (Hungary)

== India ==
- National Highway 51 (India)

== Iran ==
- Zobahan Freeway
- Road 51

== Italy ==
- Autostrada A51

== Japan ==
- Japan National Route 51

== South Korea ==
- National Route 51

== Lebanon ==
- 51M Coastal Highway

== New Zealand ==
- New Zealand State Highway 51

== Philippines ==
- N51 highway (Philippines)

== South Africa ==
- R51

== Turkey ==
- O-51, a motorway in Turkey running from Adana to Mersin.

== United Kingdom ==
- British A51 (Kingsbury-Chester)

== United States ==
- U.S. Route 51
- Alabama State Route 51
- Arizona State Route 51
- Arkansas Highway 51
- California State Route 51 (unsigned)
- Colorado State Highway 51 (1923-1968) (former)
- Florida State Road 51
  - County Road 51 (Hamilton County, Florida)
- Georgia State Route 51
  - Georgia State Route 51 (1920) (former)
- Hawaii Route 51
- Idaho State Highway 51
- Illinois Route 51 (former)
- Indiana State Road 51
- Iowa Highway 51
- K-51 (Kansas highway)
- Maryland Route 51
  - Maryland Route 51A
  - Maryland Route 51B (former)
  - Maryland Route 51C (former)
  - Maryland Route 51D
  - Maryland Route 51E
  - Maryland Route 51F
- M-51 (Michigan highway)
- Minnesota State Highway 51
  - County Road 51 (Anoka County, Minnesota)
  - County Road 51 (Ramsey County, Minnesota)
- Missouri Route 51
- Nebraska Highway 51
  - Nebraska Link 51A
  - Nebraska Link 51B
  - Nebraska Link 51C
  - Nebraska Recreation Road 51E
  - Nebraska Recreation Road 51F
  - Nebraska Recreation Road 51G
  - Nebraska Recreation Road 51H
- Nevada State Route 51
- New Hampshire Route 51
- New Jersey Route 51 (former)
  - County Route 51 (Bergen County, New Jersey)
    - County Route S51 (Bergen County, New Jersey)
  - County Route 51 (Monmouth County, New Jersey)
- New Mexico State Road 51
- New York State Route 51
  - County Route 51 (Cayuga County, New York)
  - County Route 51 (Dutchess County, New York)
  - County Route 51 (Erie County, New York)
  - County Route 51 (Essex County, New York)
  - County Route 51 (Franklin County, New York)
  - County Route 51 (Greene County, New York)
  - County Route 51 (Herkimer County, New York)
  - County Route 51 (Madison County, New York)
  - County Route 51 (Oneida County, New York)
  - County Route 51 (Orange County, New York)
  - County Route 51 (Putnam County, New York)
  - County Route 51 (Rensselaer County, New York)
  - County Route 51 (Rockland County, New York)
  - County Route 51 (Saratoga County, New York)
  - County Route 51 (Schoharie County, New York)
  - County Route 51 (Suffolk County, New York)
  - County Route 51 (Sullivan County, New York)
  - County Route 51 (Ulster County, New York)
- North Carolina Highway 51
- Ohio State Route 51
- Oklahoma State Highway 51
  - Oklahoma State Highway 51A
  - Oklahoma State Highway 51B
- Oregon Route 51
- Pennsylvania Route 51
- Rhode Island Route 51
- South Carolina Highway 51
- Tennessee State Route 51
- Texas State Highway 51
  - Texas State Highway Spur 51
  - Farm to Market Road 51
  - Texas Park Road 51
- Utah State Route 51
- Virginia State Route 51
  - Virginia State Route 51 (1928-1950) (former)
- West Virginia Route 51
  - West Virginia Route 51 (1920s) (former)
  - West Virginia Route 51 (1930s) (former)
- Wisconsin Highway 51 (former)
- Wyoming Highway 51

== Vietnam ==
- National Road 51 (Vietnam)

== See also ==
- A51 (disambiguation)

Preceded by 50	Lists of highways 51	Succeeded by 52
