= List of highways numbered 52 =

The following highways are numbered 52:

== Australia ==
- Kings Highway (Australia)
- Isis Highway (Childers to Ban Ban Springs) – Queensland State Route 52 (Wide Bay–Burnett Region)
- Gillies Highway – Queensland State Route 52 (Far North Queensland Region)

== Canada ==
- Alberta Highway 52
- British Columbia Highway 52
- Manitoba Highway 52
- Highway 52 (Ontario)
- Saskatchewan Highway 52

== Czech Republic ==
- D52 motorway, part of
- I/52 highway; Czech: silnice I/52

== Finland ==
- Finnish national road 52

== Greece ==
- A52 motorway (Amvrakia Odos)

== India ==
- National Highway 52 (India)

== Italy ==
- Autostrada A52

== Japan ==
- Japan National Route 52

== Korea, South ==
- Gwangju–Wonju Expressway
- National Route 52

== New Zealand ==
- New Zealand State Highway 52 between Waipukurau and Masterton (former)

== Philippines ==
- N52 highway (Philippines)

== Turkey ==
- O-52, a motorway in Turkey running from Adana to Şanlıurfa.

== United Kingdom ==
- British A52 (Newcastle-Mablethorpe)

== United States ==
- U.S. Route 52
- Alabama State Route 52
- Arkansas Highway 52
- California State Route 52
- Colorado State Highway 52
- Connecticut Route 52 (former)
- Delaware Route 52
- Florida State Road 52
  - County Road 52 Alternate (Pasco County, Florida)
- Georgia State Route 52
  - Georgia State Route 52 (former)
- Idaho State Highway 52
- Illinois Route 52 (former)
- K-52 (Kansas highway)
- Kentucky Route 52
- Louisiana Highway 52
  - Louisiana State Route 52 (former)
- Maine State Route 52
- Maryland Route 52 (former)
- Massachusetts Route 52 (former)
- M-52 (Michigan highway)
- Missouri Route 52
- Nebraska Highway 52
- Nevada State Route 52 (former)
- New Jersey Route 52
  - County Route 52 (Monmouth County, New Jersey)
- New Mexico State Road 52
- New York State Route 52
  - County Route 52 (Albany County, New York)
  - County Route 52 (Chautauqua County, New York)
  - County Route 52 (Dutchess County, New York)
  - County Route 52 (Franklin County, New York)
  - County Route 52 (Jefferson County, New York)
  - County Route 52 (Madison County, New York)
  - County Route 52 (Monroe County, New York)
  - County Route 52 (Montgomery County, New York)
  - County Route 52 (Niagara County, New York)
  - County Route 52 (Orleans County, New York)
  - County Route 52 (Otsego County, New York)
  - County Route 52 (Rensselaer County, New York)
  - County Route 52 (Rockland County, New York)
  - County Route 52 (Saratoga County, New York)
  - County Route 52 (St. Lawrence County, New York)
  - County Route 52 (Steuben County, New York)
  - County Route 52 (Suffolk County, New York)
  - County Route 52 (Sullivan County, New York)
  - County Route 52 (Ulster County, New York)
  - County Route 52 (Westchester County, New York)
- Ohio State Route 52 (former)
- Oklahoma State Highway 52
- Oregon Route 52
- Pennsylvania Route 52
- South Carolina Highway 52 (former)
- South Dakota Highway 52
- Tennessee State Route 52
- Texas State Highway 52 (former)
  - Texas State Highway Spur 52
  - Farm to Market Road 52
  - Texas Park Road 52
- Utah State Route 52
- Virginia State Route 52 (former)
  - Virginia State Route 52 (1928-1933) (former)
  - Virginia State Route 52 (1933-1934) (former)
- West Virginia Route 52
- Wisconsin Highway 52

Territories

- Puerto Rico Highway 52

== Vietnam ==
- National Route 52 (Vietnam)

== See also ==
- List of highways numbered 52A
- A52 (disambiguation)

Preceded by 51	Lists of highways 52	Succeeded by 53
