= Route 54 (disambiguation) =

Route 54 may refer to:

- Route 54 (MTA Maryland), a public bus route in Baltimore, Maryland and its suburbs
- Dublin Bus (No. 54A), a bus route in Dublin, Ireland
- London Buses route 54
- Route 54 (WMATA), a public bus route in Washington, D.C.

== See also ==
- List of highways numbered 54
