= SR53 =

SR 53 may refer to:

- Saunders-Roe SR.53, a rocket-powered jet fighter-interceptor
- State Road 53 or State Route 53
