= List of highways numbered 54 =

The following highways are numbered 54:

== Canada ==
- Alberta Highway 54
- Saskatchewan Highway 54

== Finland ==
- Finnish national road 54

== Greece ==
- EO54 road

== India ==
- National Highway 54 (India)

== Italy ==
- Autostrada A54

== Japan ==
- Japan National Route 54

== Korea, South ==
- National Route 54

== Mexico ==
- Mexican Federal Highway 54

== New Zealand ==
- New Zealand State Highway 54

== Philippines ==
- N54 highway (Philippines)

== Turkey ==
- O-54, a motorway in Turkey as the half ring road in Gaziantep.

== United Kingdom ==
- British A54 (Buxton-Chester)
- British M54 (Wellington-Essington)

== United States ==
- U.S. Route 54
- Alabama State Route 54
  - County Route 54 (Lee County, Alabama)
- Arkansas Highway 54
- California State Route 54
- Delaware Route 54
- Florida State Road 54
  - County Road 54 (Pasco County, Florida)
- Georgia State Route 54
  - Georgia State Route 54B (former)
- Idaho State Highway 54
- Illinois Route 54
- Indiana State Road 54
- Kentucky Route 54
- Louisiana Highway 54
- Maryland Route 54
- M-54 (Michigan highway)
- Minnesota State Highway 54
  - County Road 54 (Anoka County, Minnesota)
- Missouri Route 54 (1922) (former)
- Nebraska Highway 54 (former)
  - Nebraska Spur 54B
  - Nebraska Spur 54D
  - Nebraska Recreation Road 54C
  - Nebraska Recreation Road 54F
- Nevada State Route 54 (former)
- New Jersey Route 54
  - County Route 54 (Bergen County, New Jersey)
  - County Route 54 (Monmouth County, New Jersey)
- New York State Route 54
  - County Route 54 (Cayuga County, New York)
  - County Route 54 (Chautauqua County, New York)
  - County Route 54 (Chemung County, New York)
  - County Route 54 (Dutchess County, New York)
  - County Route 54 (Franklin County, New York)
  - County Route 54 (Jefferson County, New York)
  - County Route 54 (Lewis County, New York)
  - County Route 54 (Orange County, New York)
  - County Route 54 (Oswego County, New York)
  - County Route 54 (Otsego County, New York)
  - County Route 54 (Putnam County, New York)
  - County Route 54 (Rensselaer County, New York)
  - County Route 54 (Saratoga County, New York)
  - County Route 54 (Schoharie County, New York)
  - County Route 54 (St. Lawrence County, New York)
  - County Route 54 (Suffolk County, New York)
  - County Route 54 (Tioga County, New York)
  - County Route 54 (Ulster County, New York)
  - County Route 54 (Washington County, New York)
  - County Route 54 (Westchester County, New York)
  - County Route 54 (Wyoming County, New York)
- North Carolina Highway 54
- North Dakota Highway 54
- Ohio State Route 54
- Oklahoma State Highway 54
- Pennsylvania Route 54
- South Dakota Highway 54 (former)
- Tennessee State Route 54
- Texas State Highway 54
  - Texas Park Road 54
- Utah State Route 54
  - Utah State Route 54 (1931-1969) (former)
- Virginia State Route 54
- West Virginia Route 54
- Wisconsin Highway 54

Territories

- Puerto Rico Highway 54
  - Puerto Rico Highway 54R

== See also ==
- List of highways numbered 54A
- A54

Preceded by 53	Lists of highways 54	Succeeded by 55
