= Buntun Bridge =

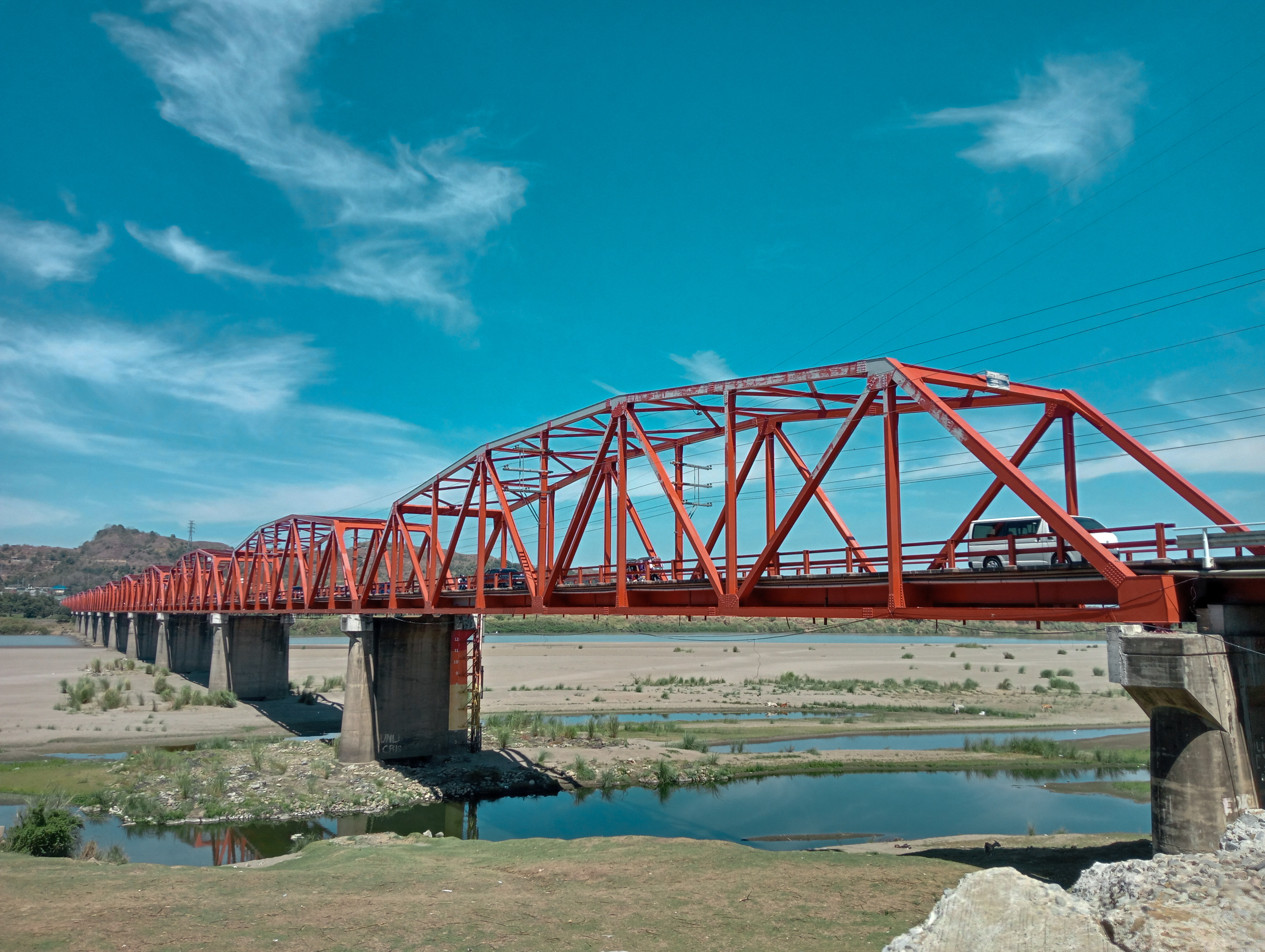
- Coordinates: 17°36′49″N 121°41′29″E
- Carries: 2 lanes of N51 (Santiago–Tuguegarao Road); pedestrian sidewalks
- Crosses: Cagayan River
- Locale: Tuguegarao City, Cagayan (North); Solana, Cagayan (South)
- Official name: Buntun Bridge
- Other name: Talletay ta Buntun
- Maintained by: Department of Public Works and Highways – Cagayan 3rd District Engineering Office

Characteristics
- Design: Steel truss bridge
- Material: Steel, Concrete, Asphalt
- Total length: 1,369 m (4,491 ft) (Note: There are inconsistencies regarding the actual length of the bridge. Numerous sources cite 1,098 m (3,602 ft) as the bridge's official length. On the other hand, the 1,369 m (4,491 ft) length was retrieved from the information indicated in the bridge itself.)
- Width: 9.60 m (31 ft)
- Height: 37 m (121 ft)
- No. of spans: 14
- Load limit: 18 t (18,000 kg)
- Clearance above: 6 m (20 ft)

History
- Constructed by: Philippine National Construction Corporation
- Construction start: December 11, 1960
- Construction end: May 10, 1969
- Opened: June 1, 1969; 57 years ago

Statistics
- Toll: No

Location
- Interactive map of Buntun Bridge

The Buntun Bridge (Itawit: Talletay ta Buntun; Ilocano: Rangtáy ti Buntun; Filipino: Tulay ng Buntun) is a river bridge that stretches from Tuguegarao City to Solana in Cagayan and spans the Cagayan River, the largest river basin in the Philippines. It forms part of the Santiago–Tuguegarao Road (designated as N51 by the Department of Public Works and Highways highway routing system), a major junction of the Pan-Philippine Highway. It was the longest bridge in the Philippines upon its opening in 1969, surpassed in 1973 by the San Juanico Bridge.

A popular belief is that the bridge is long enough for a person to recite the entire Philippine National Anthem (Lupang Hinirang) while traversing.

== History ==
In 1959, President Carlos P. Garcia released ₱200,000 to start the construction of the bridge. The meager amount was augmented in several appropriations embodied in different Republic Acts through the initiative of Cagayan's 2nd District Congressman Benjamin Ligot. The ground-breaking ceremony on December 11, 1960, was attended by President Garcia.

=== Construction ===
The construction was based from the original plan of ten 240-foot (73 m) steel through truss spans and one 50-foot (15 m) I-beam approach on each end. With the initial ₱200,000, Angeleo Alonzo, the first District Engineer of Department of Public Works, Transportation and Communications 2nd Cagayan Engineering District, completed Abutment A. Pier I, footing and pedestal of Pier II.

In 1962, however, Diosdado Macapagal took over as president and no one knew whether or not he would continue the project. Congressman Ligot convinced the President to continue the project under one AGUID Construction Company. The frequent floods have widened the river channel and caused the change of plan for the bridge to 14 240-foot (73 m) Japanese steel through truss spans and one 50-foot (15 m) I-beam approach on the Solana side.

President Ferdinand Marcos ordered Public Works, Transportation and Communications Secretary Antonio Raquiza to assign the bureau's construction team led by Engineer Rogelio Talastas to Buntun Bridge. The team, under Alonzo's general supervision, went to work in full swing in May 1968.

By May 10 the following year, the bridge was practically completed. However, the construction team was transferred to another project, leaving Alonzo to complete the painting of the landmark structure and the construction of the grouted riprap and the road approaches.

First Lady Imelda Marcos opened the bridge to vehicular traffic on June 1, 1969, which took three administrations to build.

== Features ==
Buntun Bridge serves as the gateway to the Cagayan's provincial capital, Tuguegarao City and links to the second and third district municipalities of Cagayan and Apayao. The road infrastructure measures 1,369 m (4,491 ft), considered the longest river bridge in the Philippines. It has 14 Japanese steel spans. The bridge offers an unobstructed, picturesque view of the Cagayan River, the widest and longest river in the country.

The bridge is also utilized as a monitoring point for water levels along the Cagayan River, particularly during floods.

== Issues ==
Due to its location on a major thoroughfare linking Tuguegarao and Solana, the bridge has become a major chokepoint for traffic between the two localities, prompting the construction of additional bridges along the Cagayan River.

In November 2025, the bridge was closed to traffic during the onslaught of Typhoon Fung-wong (2025) (Uwan) after water levels beneath the bridge reached 12 m (39 ft).

== See also ==
- List of bridges in the Philippines
