= Santiago–Tuguegarao Road =

National road in the Philippines

Santiago–Tuguegarao Road

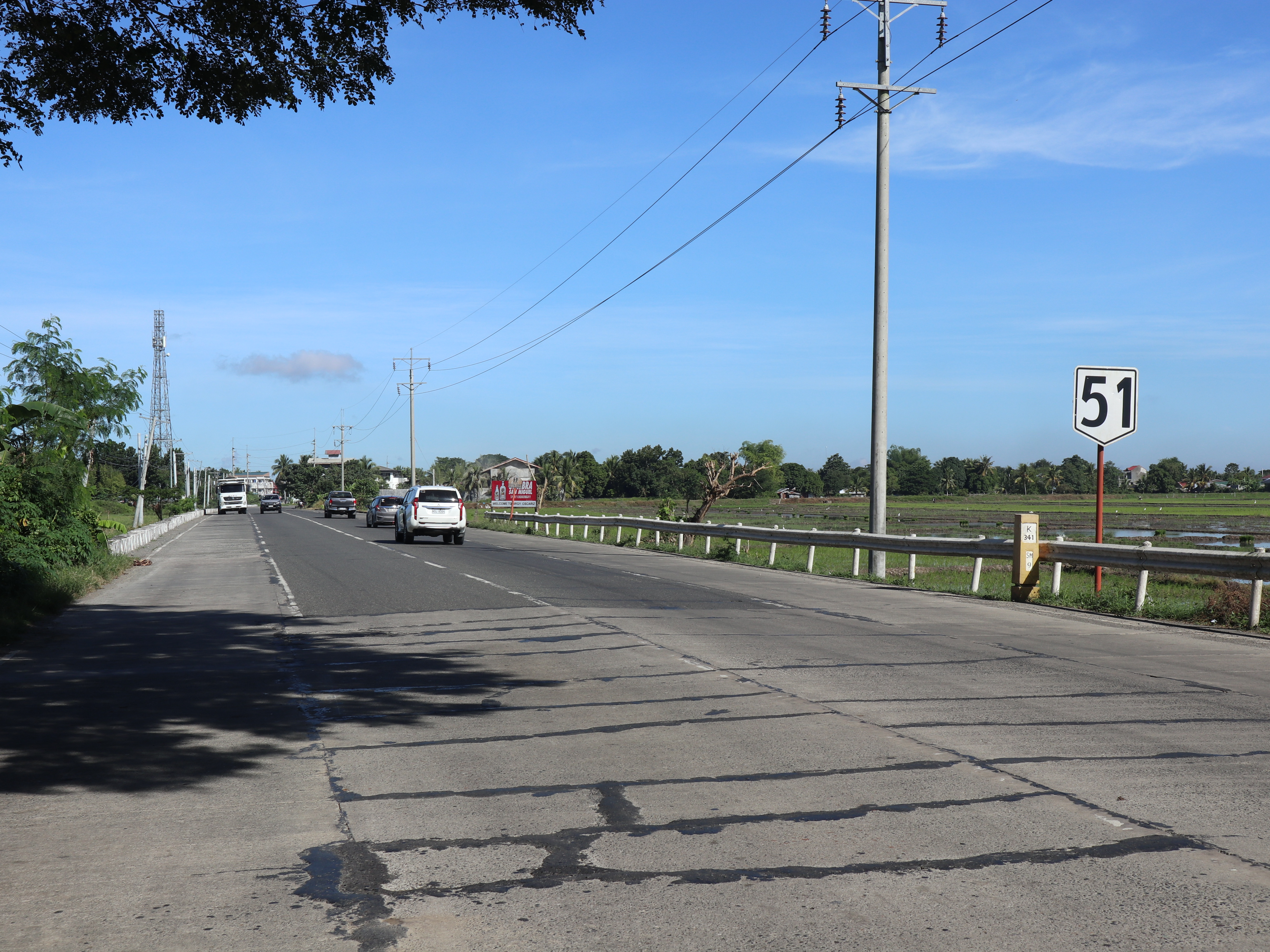
- The Ramon, Isabela segment of the road, with Route 51 sign

Route information
- Length: 130 km (81 mi)
- Component highways: N51

Major junctions
- South end: AH 26 (N1) (Maharlika Highway) / R.C. Miranda Road in Mabini, Santiago
- N224 (Banaue–Mayoyao–Alfonso Lista–Isabela Road) in Ramon, Isabela; N53 (Santiago–Tuguegarao Bypass Road) in Cabatuan, Isabela; N53 (Santiago–Tuguegarao Bypass Road) in Cabatuan, Isabela; N220 (Cabagan–Santa Maria Road) in Santa Maria, Isabela; N52 (Kalinga–Cagayan Road) in Enrile, Cagayan; N106 (Tuguegarao Diversion Road II) in Buntun, Tuguegarao; N107 (Tuguegarao Diversion Road I) in Ugac Sur, Tuguegarao; N107 (Tuguegarao Diversion Road I) in Balzain East, Tuguegarao
- North end: AH 26 (N1) (Cagayan Valley Road) / N106 (Tuguegarao Diversion Road II) in Tanza, Tuguegarao

Location
- Country: Philippines
- Provinces: Cagayan, Kalinga, Isabela
- Major cities: Tuguegarao, Santiago
- Towns: Ramon, San Mateo, Cabatuan, Aurora, San Manuel, Roxas, Mallig, Quezon, Rizal, Santa Maria, Enrile, Solana

Highway system
- Roads in the Philippines; Highways; Expressways; List
← N11	→ N52

Santiago–Tuguegarao Road is a major national primary road in the provinces of Cagayan, Kalinga, and Isabela in the Philippines. It is a bypass road of the Pan-Philippine Highway, also known as Cagayan Valley Road, connecting to the cities of Tuguegarao and Santiago.

The road is designated as National Route 51 (N51) of the Philippine highway network.

== Route description ==
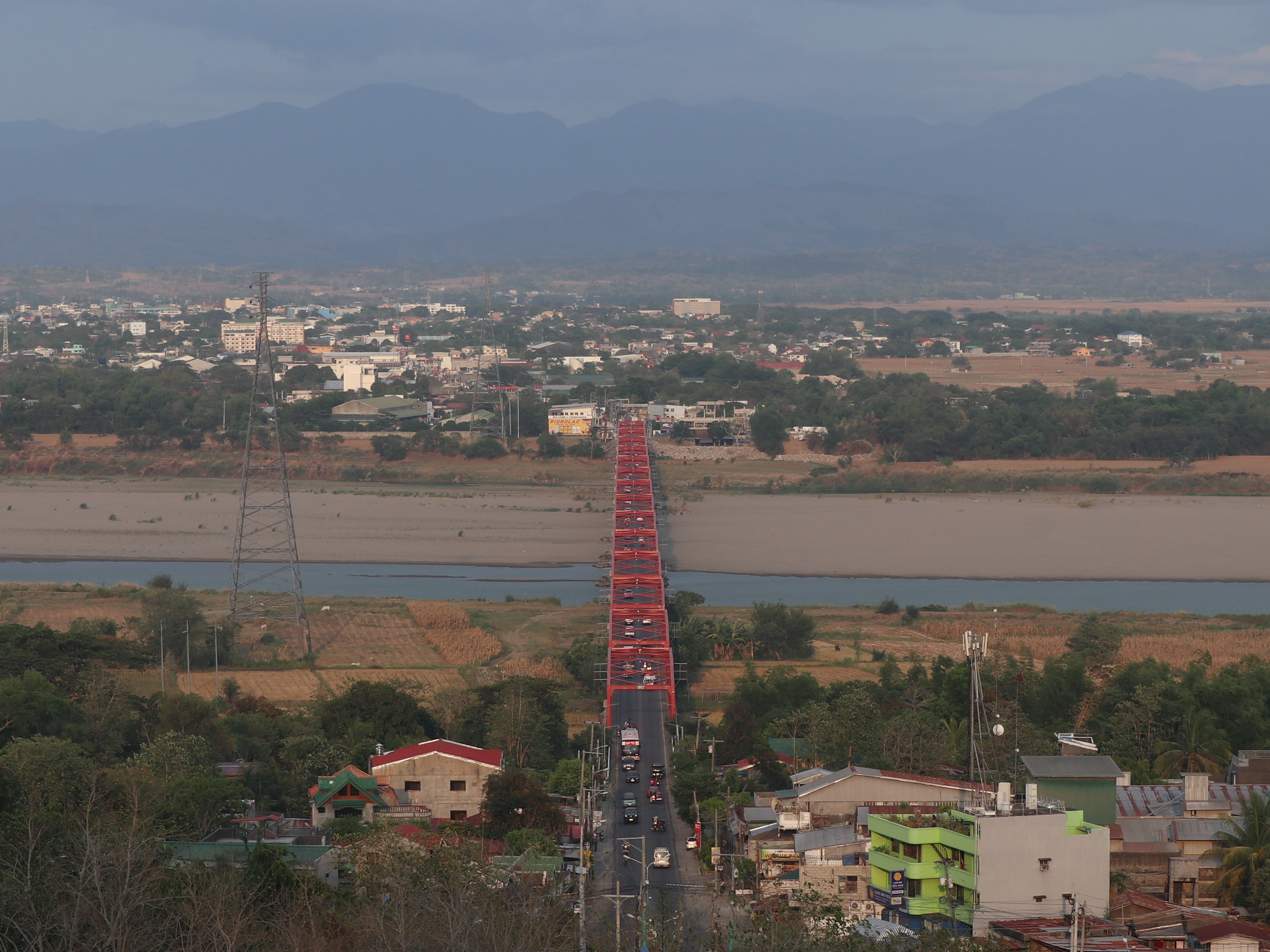
Aerial view of Santiago–Tuguegarao Road in Cagayan, with the Buntun Bridge, which carries the road over the Cagayan River.

=== Santiago to Cabatuan ===
Santiago–Tuguegarao Road starts at Mabini Junction, a roundabout intersection with Maharlika Highway and R.C. Miranda Road in Barangay Mabini, Santiago City. Heading north, it then runs straight to the north where it traverses the municipalities of Ramon, San Mateo, and Cabatuan in Isabela.

=== Cabatuan to Santa Maria ===
At the poblacion of Cabatuan, the road turns north at its intersection with Santiago–Tuguegarao Bypass Road, where the Triangle Park is situated. It then crosses the Magat River vis Magat Bridge and traverses the municipalities of Aurora, San Manuel, Roxas, Mallig, and Quezon in Isabela before entering the province of Kalinga. In Kalinga, it traverses the lowland municipalities of Tabuk, the province's capital, and Rizal, away from their poblacions. It then re-enters Isabela and traverses the municipalities of Santo Tomas and Santa Maria.

=== Santa Maria to Tuguegarao ===
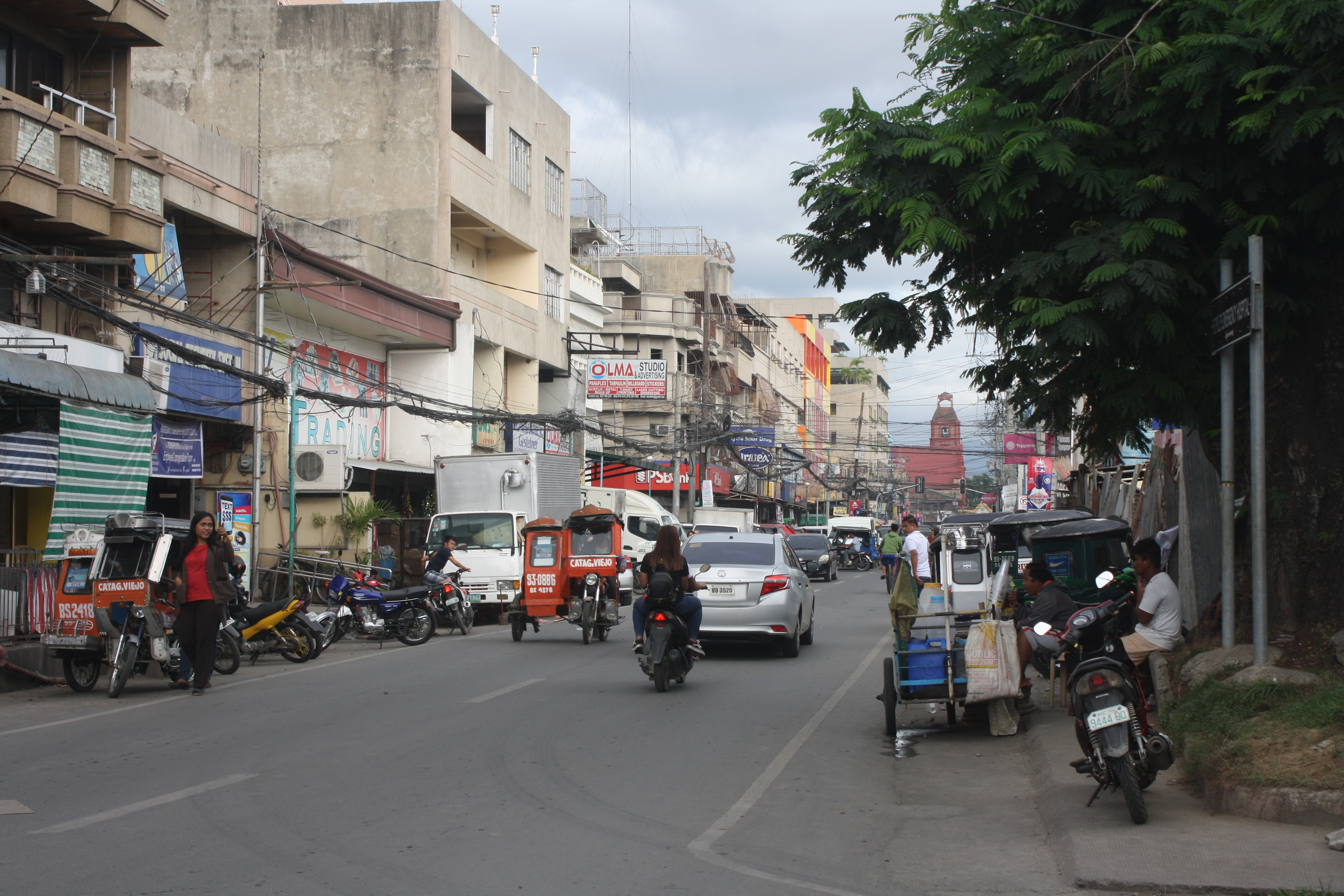
A section of the highway as Luna Street in Tuguegarao

In Santa Maria, Isabela, the road makes a sharp left turn at its intersection with Cabagan–Santa Maria Road. It then enters the province of Cagayan and traverses the municipalities of Enrile and Solana, where it turns east at its intersection with Cagayan–Apayao Road. It crosses the Cagayan River through the Buntun Bridge and enters the city of Tuguegarao. Approaching the poblacion, it assumes local street names such as Luna Extension and Luna Street, respectively. At its intersection with Rizal Street, west of the Tuguegarao Cathedral, it turns north and assumes such local street name. It then turns northeast towards the Balzain Bridge II and becomes Balzain Highway. The road ends at the Tuguegarao Junction, a roundabout intersection with Maharlika Highway (Cagayan Valley Road) and Tuguegarao Diversion Road II.

== Intersections ==
Intersections are numbered by kilometer post, with Rizal Park in Manila designated as kilometer zero.

Region	Province	City/Municipality	km	mi	Destinations	Notes
Cagayan Valley	Isabela	Santiago	327	203	AH 26 (N1) (Maharlika Highway) / R.C. Miranda Road	Southern terminus. Roundabout intersection.
Cagayan Valley	Isabela	Ramon	340.5	211.6	Burgos–Aguinaldo Road	
Cagayan Valley	Isabela	Ramon	341.8	212.4	N224 (Banaue–Mayoyao–Alfonso Lista–Isabela Road)	
Cagayan Valley	Isabela	San Mateo	350.9	218.0	Alicia–San Mateo Road	
Cagayan Valley	Isabela	Cabatuan	361.9	224.9	N53 (Santiago–Tuguegarao Bypass Road)	South end of bypass.
Cagayan Valley	Isabela	Cabatuan	363.3	225.7	N53 (Santiago–Tuguegarao Bypass Road)	North end of bypass.
Cagayan Valley	Isabela	Roxas	382.6	237.7	Gamu–Roxas Road	
Cagayan Valley	Isabela	Mallig	392.7	244.0	Ilagan–Delfin Albano–Mallig Road	
Cagayan Valley	Isabela	Santa Maria	432	268	N220 (Cabagan–Santa Maria Road)	
Cagayan Valley	Isabela	Quezon	408.7	254.0	Abbut–Agbannawag Road	
Cordillera Administrative Region	Kalinga	Rizal	419.6	260.7	Rizal National Road	
Cagayan Valley	Isabela	Santa Maria			Cabagan–Santa Maria Road	
Cagayan Valley	Cagayan	Enrile	437	272	N52 (Kalinga–Cagayan Road)	
Cagayan Valley	Cagayan	Solana	452	281	Cagayan–Apayao Road	
Cagayan Valley	Cagayan	Tuguegarao			N106 (Tuguegarao Diversion Road II)	
Cagayan Valley	Cagayan	Tuguegarao			N107 (Tuguegarao Diversion Road I)	Locally known as College Avenue; south end of bypass
Cagayan Valley	Cagayan	Tuguegarao			Rizal Street	Road assumes the name Rizal Street.
Cagayan Valley	Cagayan	Tuguegarao			N107 (Tuguegarao Diversion Road I)	Locally known as College Avenue; north end of bypass. Road assumes the name Balzain Highway.
Cagayan Valley	Cagayan	Tuguegarao	456	283	AH 26 (N1) (Cagayan Valley Road) / N106 (Tuguegarao Diversion Road II)	Northern terminus. Roundabout intersection.
1.000 mi = 1.609 km; 1.000 km = 0.621 mi

== Santiago–Tuguegarao Bypass Road ==
Santiago–Tuguegarao Bypass Road
- Location: Cabatuan, Isabela
- Length: 2.275 km (1.414 mi)

The Santiago–Tuguegarao Bypass Road is short bypass of Santiago–Tuguegarao Road in Cabatuan, Isabela. This bypass road is designated as National Route 53 (N53) of the Philippine highway network. It connects Cabatuan, Luna and Cauayan.
