= List of highways numbered 52A =

The following highways are numbered 52A:

== United States ==
- County Road 52A (Pasco County, Florida)
- Missouri Route 52A (former)
- New York State Route 52A

== See also ==
- List of highways numbered 52
