= List of highways numbered 53 =

The following highways are numbered 53:

== Cambodia ==
- National Road 53 (Cambodia)

== Canada ==
- Alberta Highway 53

== Greece ==
- EO53 road

== India ==
- National Highway 53 (India)

== Ireland ==
- N53 road (Ireland)

== Italy ==
- Autostrada A53

== Japan ==
- Japan National Route 53

== Korea, South ==
- National Route 53 (South Korea)

== Mexico ==
- Mexican Federal Highway 53

== New Zealand ==
- New Zealand State Highway 53

== Norway ==
- Norwegian County Road 53 (Bokmål: Fylkesvei 53, Nynorsk: Fylkesveg 53)

== Philippines ==
- N53 highway (Philippines)

== Turkey ==
- O-53, a motorway in Turkey connecting O-52 with İskenderun, Hatay Province.

== United Kingdom ==
- British A53 (Shrewsbury-Buxton)
- British M53 (Wallasey-Chester)

== United States ==
- Interstate 53 (former proposal)
- U.S. Route 53
- Alabama State Route 53
- Arkansas Highway 53
- California State Route 53
- Colorado State Highway 53
- Connecticut Route 53
- Florida State Road 53
  - County Road 53 (Lafayette County, Florida)
  - County Road 53 (Madison County, Florida)
- Georgia State Route 53
- Idaho State Highway 53
- Illinois Route 53
- Indiana State Road 53
- Iowa Highway 53 (1926-1949) (former)
- K-53 (Kansas highway)
- Kentucky Route 53
- Louisiana Highway 53
  - Louisiana State Route 53 (former)
- Maryland Route 53
- Massachusetts Route 53
- M-53 (Michigan highway)
- County Road 53 (Anoka County, Minnesota)
  - County Road 53 (Hennepin County, Minnesota)
  - County Road 53 (Ramsey County, Minnesota)
- Mississippi Highway 53
- Missouri Route 53
- Nebraska Highway 53
  - Nebraska Link 53A
  - Nebraska Link 53B
  - Nebraska Link 53C
  - Nebraska Link 53E
- Nevada State Route 53 (former)
- New Jersey Route 53
  - County Route 53 (Bergen County, New Jersey)
  - County Route 53 (Monmouth County, New Jersey)
  - County Route 53 (Ocean County, New Jersey)
- New Mexico State Road 53
- New York State Route 53
  - County Route 53 (Cattaraugus County, New York)
  - County Route 53 (Chautauqua County, New York)
  - County Route 53 (Delaware County, New York)
  - County Route 53 (Dutchess County, New York)
  - County Route 53 (Franklin County, New York)
  - County Route 53 (Greene County, New York)
  - County Route 53 (Jefferson County, New York)
  - County Route 53 (Madison County, New York)
  - County Route 53 (Monroe County, New York)
  - County Route 53 (Montgomery County, New York)
  - County Route 53 (Oneida County, New York)
  - County Route 53 (Onondaga County, New York)
    - County Route 53A (Onondaga County, New York)
  - County Route 53 (Orange County, New York)
  - County Route 53 (Orleans County, New York)
  - County Route 53 (Otsego County, New York)
  - County Route 53 (Putnam County, New York)
  - County Route 53 (Rensselaer County, New York)
  - County Route 53 (Rockland County, New York)
  - County Route 53 (Saratoga County, New York)
  - County Route 53 (Suffolk County, New York)
  - County Route 53 (Sullivan County, New York)
  - County Route 53 (Ulster County, New York)
    - County Route 53A (Ulster County, New York)
  - County Route 53 (Warren County, New York)
  - County Route 53 (Westchester County, New York)
  - County Route 53 (Wyoming County, New York)
- North Carolina Highway 53
- North Dakota Highway 53
- Ohio State Route 53
- Oklahoma State Highway 53
  - Oklahoma State Highway 53A
- Oregon Route 53
- Pennsylvania Route 53
- South Carolina Highway 53
- South Dakota Highway 53
- Tennessee State Route 53
- Texas State Highway 53
  - Texas State Highway Spur 53
  - Farm to Market Road 53 (former)
  - Texas Park Road 53 (former)
- Utah State Route 53
- Vermont Route 53
- Virginia State Route 53
- West Virginia Route 53
  - West Virginia Route 53 (1920s) (former)
- Wisconsin Highway 53 (former)

Territories:

- Puerto Rico Highway 53

Preceded by 52	Lists of highways 53	Succeeded by 54
