= Kalinga–Cagayan Road =

Road in the Philippines

Kalinga–Cagayan Road
- Tabuk–Enrile Road
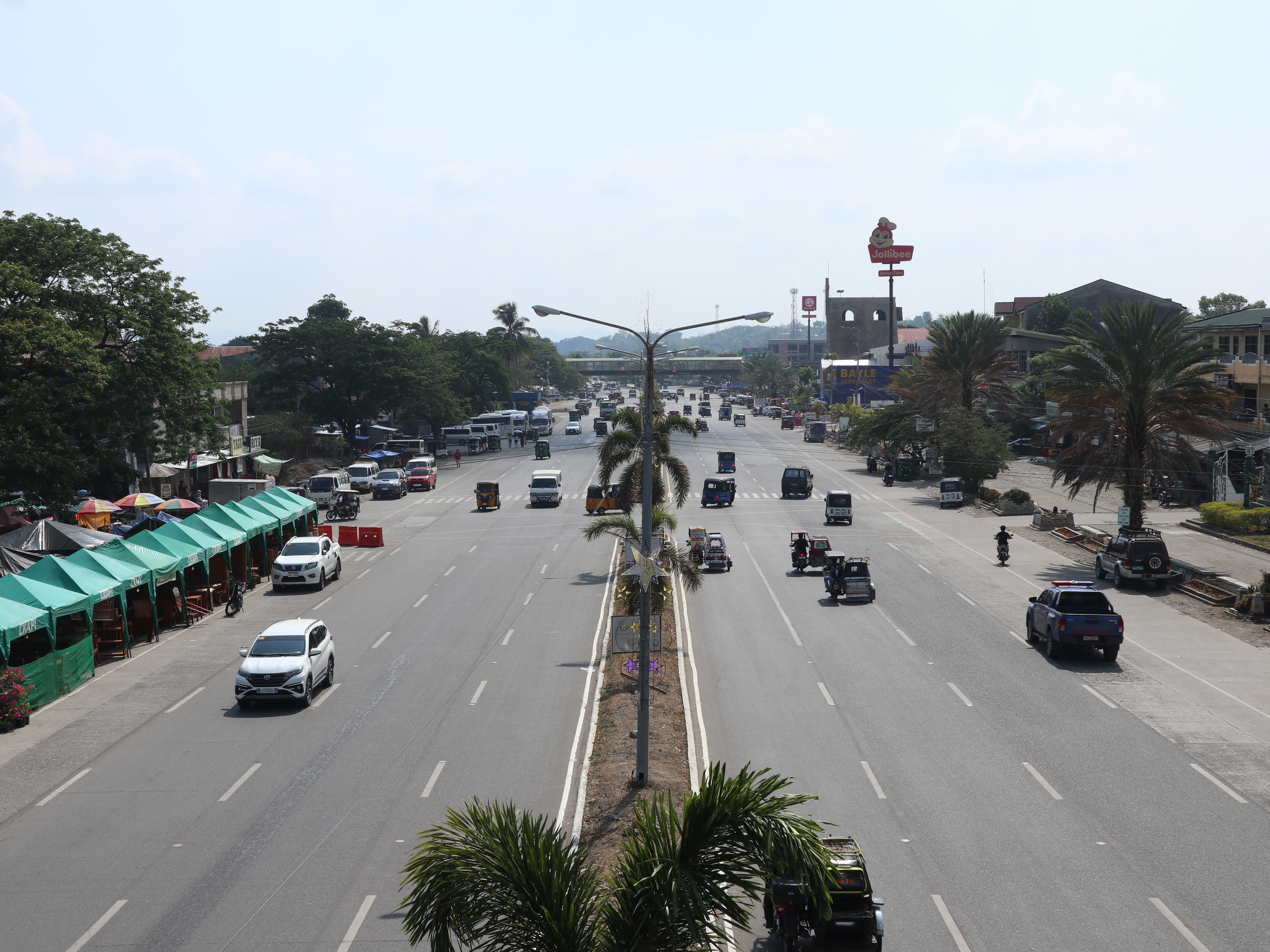
- The segment of the road in Bulanao

Route information
- Maintained by Department of Public Works and Highways
- Length: 39.547 km (24.573 mi)
- Component highways: N52

Major junctions
- Southeast end: N222 (Calanan–Pinukpuk–Abbut Road) in Tabuk
- Northwest end: N51 (Santiago–Tuguegarao Road) in Enrile, Cagayan

Location
- Country: Philippines
- Provinces: Kalinga, Isabela, Cagayan
- Major cities: Tabuk
- Towns: Enrile, Santa Maria, Rizal

Highway system
- Roads in the Philippines; Highways; Expressways; List
← N51	→ N53

The Kalinga–Cagayan Road or Tabuk–Enrile Road, is a 39.547-kilometer (24.573 mi) major road that connects the city of Tabuk in Kalinga to the municipality of Enrile in Cagayan.

The entire road is designated as National Route 52 (N52) of the Philippine highway network.

== Intersections ==
Intersections are numbered by kilometer posts, with Rizal Park in Manila designated as kilometer zero.

Region	Province	City/Municipality	km	mi	Destinations	Notes
Cordillera Administrative Region	Kalinga	Tabuk			N222 (Calanan–Pinukpuk–Abbut Road)	
Cordillera Administrative Region	Kalinga	Tabuk			Bulanao–Paracelis Road	
Cordillera Administrative Region	Kalinga	Tabuk			Nambaran–Isabela Road	
Cordillera Administrative Region	Kalinga	Rizal			Rizal National Road	Liwan West–Babalag–Macutay Section
Cordillera Administrative Region	Kalinga	Rizal			Rizal National Road	Romualdez–Santor–Calaocan–San Pascual Section
Cagayan Valley	Cagayan	Enrile			N51 (Santiago–Tuguegarao Road)	
1.000 mi = 1.609 km; 1.000 km = 0.621 mi
