= A51 =

A51 may refer to:

- Area 51, the nickname for a military base in Nevada that is the subject of many conspiracy theories
- A51 Terrain Park (Colorado), a terrain park in Keystone, Colorado
- A51 road, a road in England connecting Kingsbury and Chester
- A51 autoroute, a road in France connecting Marseille and Grenoble
- A5/1, in cryptography, a stream cipher used in GSM cellular networks
- Samsung Galaxy A51, a smartphone released in 2019
- Budapest Gambit in chess (Encyclopaedia of Chess Openings code "A51", among others)
- A-51, a Namibian hip hop band
