= Enrile, Cagayan =

Municipality in Cagayan, Philippines

Enrile
- Municipality
- Municipality of Enrile
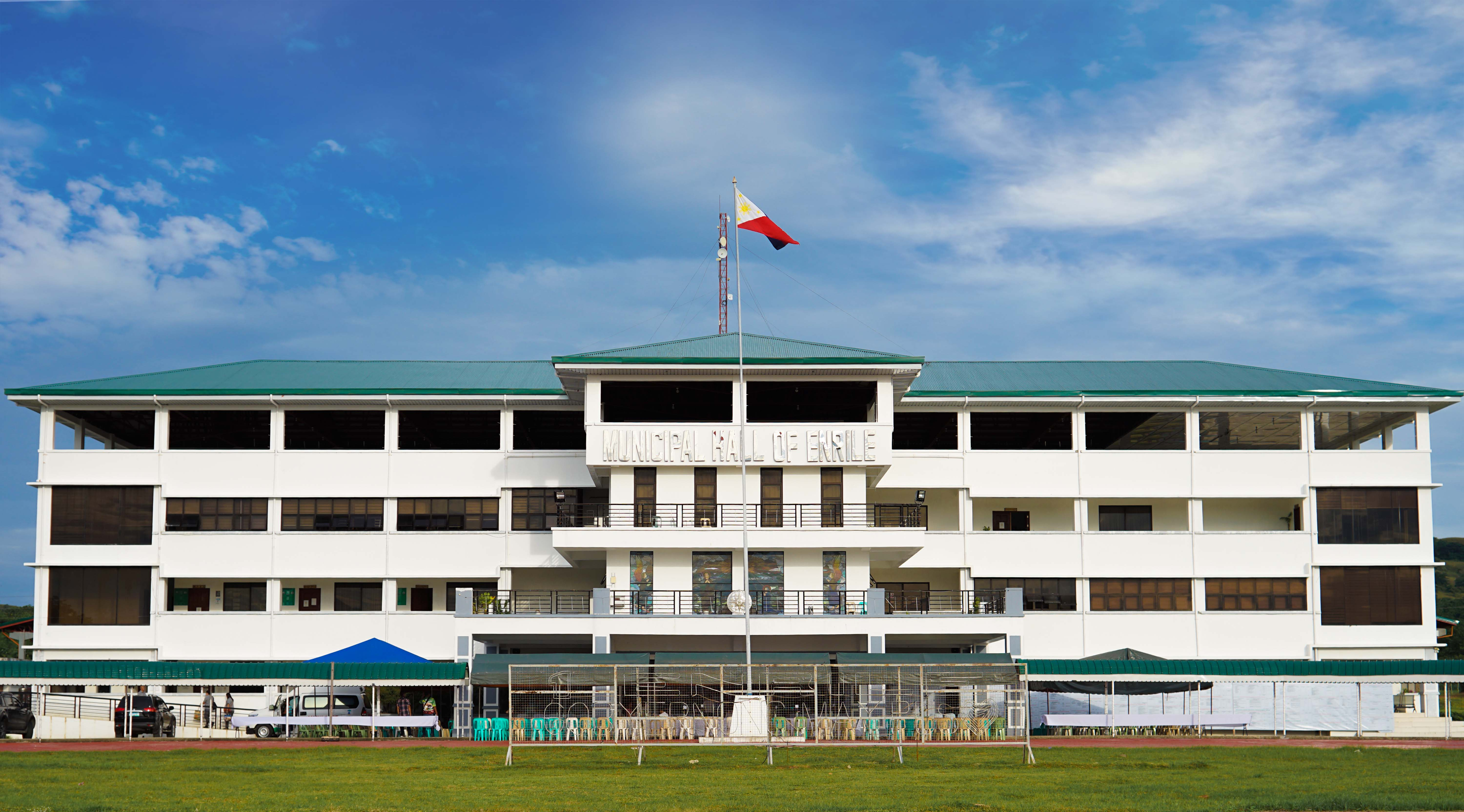
- Municipal Hall of Enrile

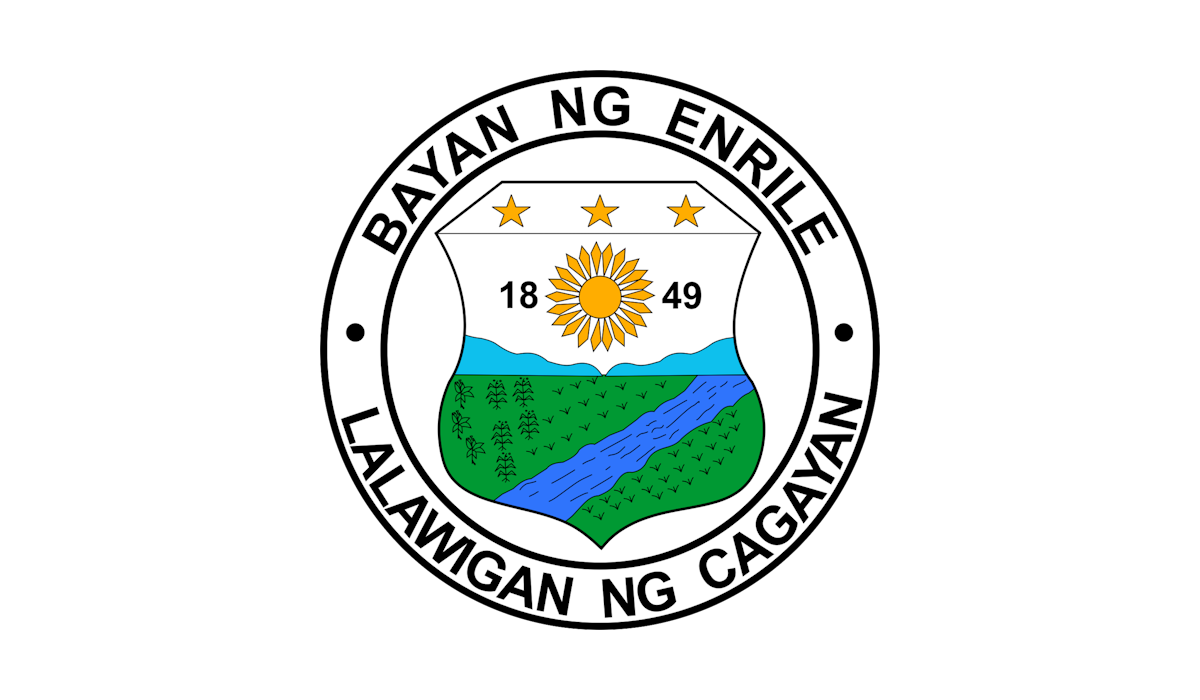
- Flag Seal
- Nickname: Peanut Capital of the Philippines
- Motto: Awan Na Matalan, Awan Nga Kalippanan
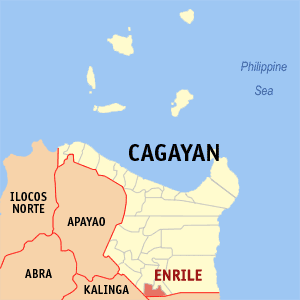
- Map of Cagayan with Enrile highlighted
- Interactive map of Enrile
- Location within the Philippines
- Coordinates: 17°33′44″N 121°42′04″E
- Country: Philippines
- Region: Cagayan Valley
- Province: Cagayan
- District: 3rd district
- Named for: Pasqual Enrile y Alcedo
- Barangays: 22 (see Barangays)

Government
  - Type: Sangguniang Bayan
  - Mayor: Miguel B. Decena Jr.
  - Vice Mayor: Alexander M. Iringan
  - Representative: Joseph "Jojo" L. Lara
  - Municipal Council: Members: Christina Magbitang; Jay Ann Aguirre; Romeo Battung; Agapita Macarubbo; Oscar Guya; Juan Carag Jr.; Peter Decena; Sergio Turingan
  - Electorate: 23,448 voters (2025)

Area
  - Total: 184.50 km^{2} (71.24 sq mi)
- Elevation: 56 m (184 ft)
- Highest elevation: 188 m (617 ft)
- Lowest elevation: 13 m (43 ft)

Population (2024 census)
  - Total: 36,481
  - Density: 197.73/km^{2} (512.12/sq mi)
  - Households: 8,235

Economy
  - Income class: 1st municipal income class
  - Poverty incidence: 9.75% (2023)
  - Revenue: ₱ 272 million (2024)
  - Assets: ₱ 475.4 million (2024)
  - Expenditure: ₱ 256.3 million (2024)
  - Liabilities: ₱ 84.13 million (2024)

Service provider
  - Electricity: Cagayan 1 Electric Cooperative (CAGELCO 1)
- Time zone: UTC+8 (PST)
- ZIP code: 3501
- PSGC: 0201512000
- IDD : area code: +63 (0)78
- Native languages: Ibanag; Ilocano; Tagalog
- Lent Culture: Padafung
- Major religions: Roman Catholic
- Catholic diocese: Roman Catholic Archdiocese of Tuguegarao
- Patron saint: Our Lady of Snows
- Festival: Peanut Festival (Mappalabbet)

Enrile, officially the Municipality of Enrile (Itawis: Babalay yo Enrile; Ibanag: Ili nat Enrile; Ilocano: Ili ti Enrile; Tagalog: Bayan ng Enrile), is a municipality in the province of Cagayan, Philippines. According to the 2024 census, it has a population of 36,481 people.

The town is predominantly an agricultural town where the majority of its population derive their income from farming. Its main products are rice, corn, peanut, tobacco, and vegetables.

== Etymology ==
Cabug was the original name of Enrile when it was a barrio of Tuguegarao. It was established as a separate town in September 1849 and named in honor of Spanish Governor-General Pasqual Enrile y Alcedo.

== History ==
The history of Enrile dates back to 1690. According to Father Juan Paguere, it was just a wide and long stretch of virgin land located at the southernmost end of the province of Cagayan. In 1718, the colonial government ordered the place to become one of the barrios of Tuguegarao. It was named "Cabugag" or Cabug, the local term for hunchback for the first settler was a man with this deformity. So the place was named after him. The name "Cabug" is engraved on the town's first church bell which is still found in the steeple.

In 1724, the Dominican Friars thought of giving the barrios their Patron Saint. Cabug was given "Nuestra Señora de las Caldas". The prominent residents of the barrio had chosen the sixth day of August as her feast day. As years went by, the land area and population of the barrio increased with surprising figures. The Cagayan River which flowed close to the barrio site gradually changed its course and moved towards Cataggaman as flood plains were formed. The non-Christian inhabitants called Kalingas gradually deserted the barrio and migrated westward to the Mountain Province. As a result, more agricultural lands were cleared and cultivated. Tobacco and corn were the chief crops of the people.

In September 1849, the colonial government ordered the separation of Cabug from the Municipality of Tuguegarao to become a town by itself. The new town was named Enrile in honor of Governor Pascual Enrile who was responsible for building roads in the northern part of Luzon during those days. The separation of Enrile from Tuguegarao led to a change of its patron saint. The population unanimously adopted "Nuestra Señora de las Nieves" as its patron Saint. The fifth day of August was chosen as her feast day.

Enrile's parish church as well as Sinupac, a hinterland of Enrile, was the hiding place of Emilio Aguinaldo and his revolutionary forces while evading pursuit from American forces during the First Philippine Republic. The locals prepared feasts for the president during his refuge.

== Geography ==
Enrile lies on the southernmost part of Cagayan, bounded by Santa Maria, Isabela to the south, by Cagayan River to the east, by Solana and Tuguegarao to the north, and Rizal, Kalinga to the west. It has a land area of 18,451.3 hectares.

Enrile is situated 13.32 kilometres (8.28 mi) from the provincial capital Tuguegarao, and 476.27 kilometres (295.94 mi) from the country's capital city of Manila.

=== Barangays ===
Enrile is politically subdivided into 22 barangays. Each barangay consists of puroks. (Some areas are still referred to their old names as sitios.)

- Alibago
- Barangay II
- Barangay IV
- Batu
- Divisoria
- Inga
- Lanna
- Lemu Norte
- Lemu Sur
- Liwan Norte
- Liwan Sur
- Maddarulug Norte
- Maddarulug Sur
- Magalalag East
- Magalalag West (San Nicolas)
- Marracuru
- Roma Norte
- Roma Sur
- San Antonio
- San Jose (Barangay III-A)
- San Roque (Barangay III-B)
- Villa Maria (Barangay I)

=== Climate ===
Climate data for Enrile, Cagayan
Month	Jan	Feb	Mar	Apr	May	Jun	Jul	Aug	Sep	Oct	Nov	Dec	Year
Mean daily maximum °C (°F)	25 (77)	26 (79)	28 (82)	31 (88)	32 (90)	31 (88)	31 (88)	30 (86)	30 (86)	28 (82)	27 (81)	25 (77)	29 (84)
Mean daily minimum °C (°F)	21 (70)	21 (70)	22 (72)	23 (73)	24 (75)	25 (77)	24 (75)	25 (77)	24 (75)	23 (73)	23 (73)	22 (72)	23 (74)
Average precipitation mm (inches)	155 (6.1)	113 (4.4)	89 (3.5)	58 (2.3)	127 (5.0)	131 (5.2)	154 (6.1)	184 (7.2)	151 (5.9)	247 (9.7)	221 (8.7)	292 (11.5)	1,922 (75.6)
Average rainy days	19.6	14.8	13.4	12	19.4	19.8	23	25	23	19.4	19.1	21.6	230.1
Source: Meteoblue

=== Land Area ===
Enrile has a land area of 18,451.3 hectares unevenly distributed to the 22 barangays of the municipality and predominantly agricultural where the majority of its inhabitants derive their income from farming.

=== Topography ===
Enrile is bounded by hills and mountains both to the north and to the west. Area with low elevation is about 20 meters above sea level at the Eastern part which lies close to the river boundaries. The highest elevation is found Northwest which is approximately 800 meters above sea level.

== Demographics ==
Population census of Enrile

Year	Pop.	±% p.a.
1903	5,999	—
1918	7,237	+1.26%
1939	9,506	+1.31%
1948	11,130	+1.77%
1960	16,095	+3.12%
1970	19,431	+1.90%
1975	20,957	+1.53%
1980	23,403	+2.23%

Year	Pop.	±% p.a.
1990	25,608	+0.90%
1995	28,736	+2.18%
2000	29,062	+0.24%
2007	29,719	+0.31%
2010	32,553	+3.37%
2015	35,834	+1.85%
2020	36,705	+0.51%
2024	36,481	−0.15%

Source: Philippine Statistics Authority

In the 2024 census, the population of Enrile was 36,481 people, with a density of 200 inhabitants per square kilometre or 520 inhabitants per square mile.

Enrile's citizens are called Itawes because they speak the Itawis dialect. Ilocanos and Tagalogs have settled at the western barangays and have blended very well in the mainstream of Itawes life.

== Economy ==
Poverty incidence of Enrile (%)

Source: Philippine Statistics Authority

Enrile is predominantly an agricultural town where the majority of its population derive their income from farming. It has a land area of 18,451.3 hectares unevenly distributed to the 22-barangays of the municipality. Its main products are rice, corn, peanut, tobacco and vegetables.

=== Peanut Production ===
The Department of Agriculture (DA) has declared the town of Enrile in Cagayan as the "peanut capital of the Philippines" for its "noteworthy contribution" to the development of the local peanut industry, with experts citing the soil suitability of the town – sandy to sandy-loam – and its unique ability to produce peanut year-round. One estimate of the town's production places a volume of 1,800 metric tons per year or 8 to 10 percent of the national supply.

Enrile is home to 800 peanut farmers cultivating 700 hectares of farmlands with a potential expansion area of another 800 hectares. "With improved production and yield, Enrile may be able to fill up a portion, if not all, of the import requirement for peanut of 15,060 metric tons," Alviar added.

== Transportation ==
Passenger jeepneys, tricycles and other private transportation vehicles service all routes within and outside Enrile. Kalesa is also driven within the poblacion and some barangays only.

== Government ==
=== Local government ===
Enrile is part of the third legislative district of the province of Cagayan. It is governed by a mayor, designated as its local chief executive, and by a municipal council as its legislative body in accordance with the Local Government Code. The mayor, vice mayor, and the councilors are elected directly by the people through an election which is being held every three years.

=== Elected officials ===
Members of the Municipal Council (2022-2025)
Position	Name
Congressman	Joseph L. Lara
Governor	Manuel N. Mamba
Mayor	Miguel B. Decena, Jr.
Vice-Mayor	Christina G. Magbitang
Councilors	Jay Ann O. Aguirre
Councilors	Maria Rosabell R. Herrera
Councilors	Jacinto T. Tuddao
Councilors	Peter B. Decena
Councilors	Romeo B. Battung
Councilors	Sergio B. Turingan
Councilors	Agapita C. Macarubbo
Councilors	Juan B. Carag, Jr.

== Education ==
The Schools Division of Cagayan governs the town's public education system. The division office is a field office of the DepEd in Cagayan Valley region. There are two schools district offices that govern both the public and private elementary and high schools throughout the municipality. These are Enrile East District, and Enrile West District.

=== Primary and elementary schools ===
- Alibago Elementary School
- Batu Elementary School
- Divisoria Elementary School
- Don Jose Paulino Elementary School
- Enrile East Central School (Magalalag)
- Enrile North Central School
- Enrile West Central School
- Inga Elementary School
- Lanna Elementary School
- Lemu Elementary School
- Little Jesus Christian Academy Liwan Branch
- Liwan Norte Elementary School
- Liwan Sur Elementary School
- Maddarulug Norte Elementary School
- Maddarulug Sur Elementary School
- Maracuru Elementary School
- Mother Therese Learning Center
- Our Lady of Snows Academy
- Roma Norte Elementary School
- Roma Sur Elementary School
- Sabino Acorda Central School
- San Antonio Elementary School

=== Secondary schools ===
- Enrile Vocational High School
- Lemu National High School
- Magalalag National High School
- Our Lady of Snows Academy
- Western Enrile Vocational High School
