= A52 =

A52 may refer to:

== Roads ==
- A52 road (England), a road connecting Newcastle-under-Lyme and Mablethorpe
- A52 motorway (France), a road connecting Aubagne and the A50
- Bundesautobahn 52, a highway in Germany usually referred to as A52
- A52 motorway (Italy), a ring road around Milan
- A52 motorway (Switzerland), a road connecting Zumikon and Hinwil
- Autovía A-52 Spain, highway connecting Benavente and O Porriño

== Other uses ==
- Samsung Galaxy A52, an Android smartphone
- The A/52 audio codec, also known as AC-3 or Dolby Digital
- Budapest Gambit, in chess (Encyclopaedia of Chess Openings code A52, among others)
- Action 52, a video game developed by Active Enterprises
- Ubiquitin A-52 residue ribosomal protein fusion product 1, a human gene
