= A54 =

A54 may refer to:

== Roads ==
- A54 road (England), a road connecting Chester and Buxton
- A54 motorway (France), a road connecting Salon-de-Provence and Nîmes
- A54 motorway (Italy), a ring road around Pavia
- A-54 freeway (Spain), a road connecting Santiago de Compostela and the N-550, N-634 and N-547
- A54 motorway (Belgium), a road connecting Charleroi and E19

== Other ==
- Agent A-54, a German double agent during World War II
- Old Indian Defense, Encyclopaedia of Chess Openings code
- Fiat A.54, a seven-cylinder, air-cooled radial engine developed in Italy in the 1930s as a powerplant for aircraft
- INS Amba (A54), a 1968 Indian Navy submarine tender ship
- Kanehana Station in Hokkaidō, Japan
- Samsung Galaxy A54 5G, an Android smartphone by Samsung Electronics
