= Nevada State Route 51 =

Nevada State Route 51 may refer to:

- Nevada State Route 51 (1935), which was renumbered as *SR 93
- Nevada State Route 51 (1960s), which existed until the 1970s renumbering
