= List of highways numbered 54A =

The following highways are numbered 54A:

== United States ==
- County Road 54A (Pasco County, Florida)
- Nebraska Spur 54A
- New York State Route 54A
- Oklahoma State Highway 54A
