= Solana, Cagayan =

Municipality in Cagayan, Philippines

Solana
- Municipality
- Municipality of Solana
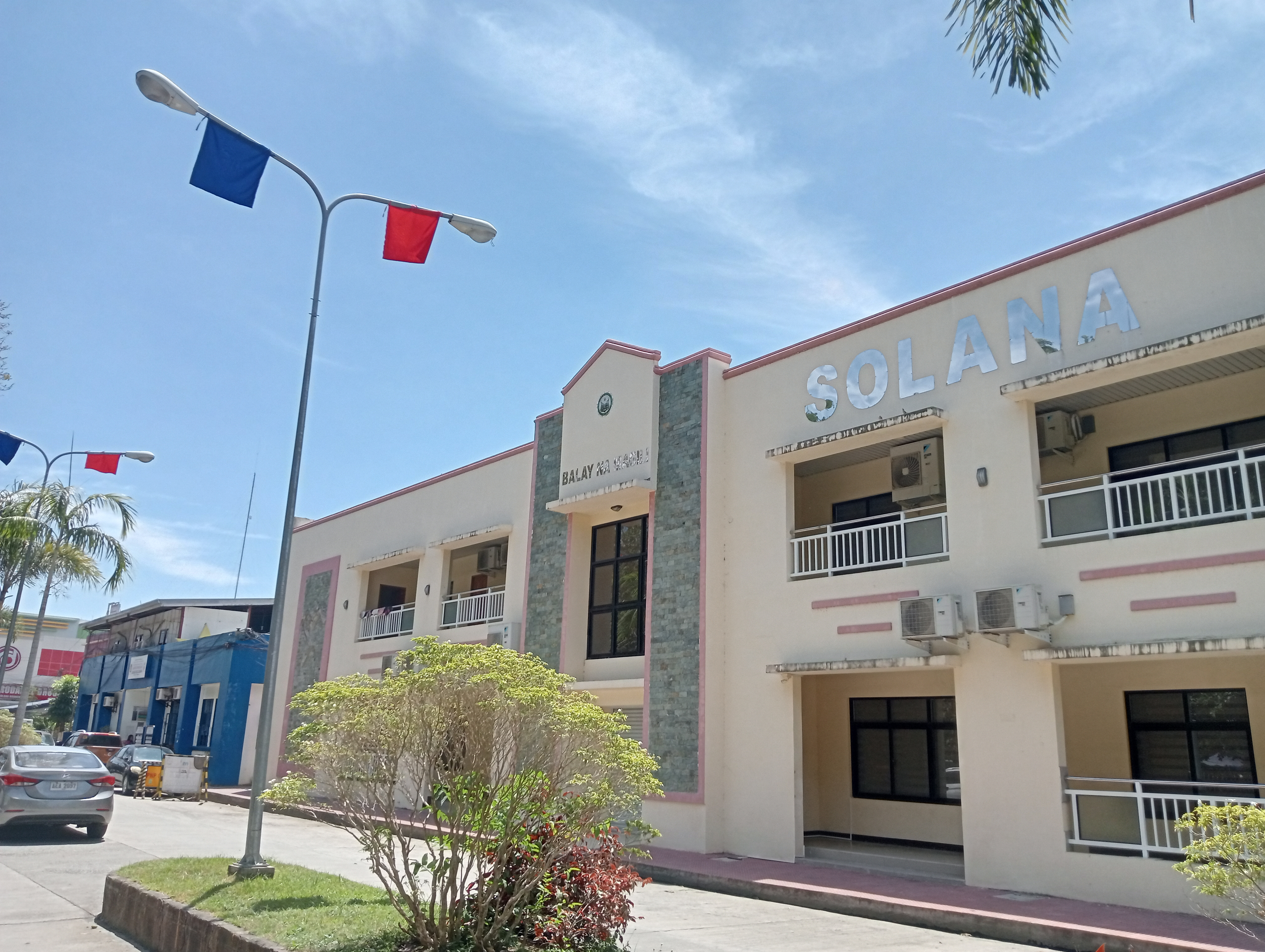
- Solana Municipal Hall

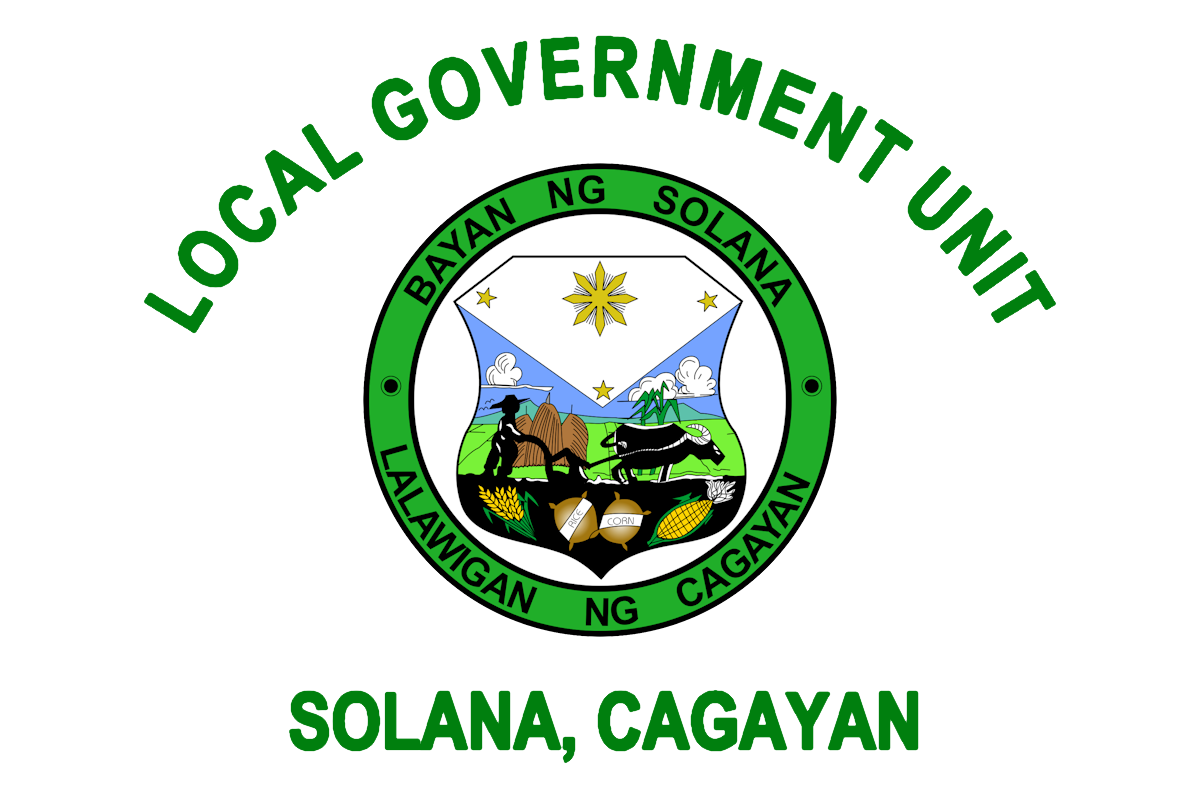
- Flag Seal

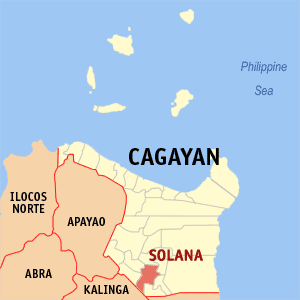
- Map of Cagayan with Solana highlighted
- Interactive map of Solana
- Location within the Philippines
- Coordinates: 17°39′08″N 121°41′29″E
- Country: Philippines
- Region: Cagayan Valley
- Province: Cagayan
- District: 3rd district
- Named for: The Marquis of La Solana
- Barangays: 38 (see Barangays)

Government
  - Type: Sangguniang Bayan
  - Mayor: Meynard Z. Carag, CPA
  - Vice Mayor: Jennalyn P. Carag
  - Representative: Joseph L. Lara
  - Municipal Council: Members: 1. Rodrigo C. De Asis; 2. All B. Ubiña; 3. Atty. Rhea Carag-Llamelo; 4. Ronald C. Cristobal; 5. Edilberto A. Edillo; 6. Atty. Carlo Paolo G. Lasam; 7. Angelina L. Fernandez; 8. John Mauro Q. Manuel
  - Electorate: 51,787 voters (2025)

Area
  - Total: 234.60 km^{2} (90.58 sq mi)
- Elevation: 34 m (112 ft)
- Highest elevation: 153 m (502 ft)
- Lowest elevation: 12 m (39 ft)

Population (2024 census)
  - Total: 89,840
  - Density: 382.9/km^{2} (991.8/sq mi)
  - Households: 21,407

Economy
  - Income class: 1st municipal income class
  - Poverty incidence: 10.28% (2023)
  - Revenue: ₱ 380.1 million (2024)
  - Assets: ₱ 1,159 million (2024)
  - Expenditure: ₱ 369 million (2024)
  - Liabilities: ₱ 289.7 million (2024)

Service provider
  - Electricity: Cagayan 1 Electric Cooperative (CAGELCO 1)
- Time zone: UTC+8 (PST)
- ZIP code: 3503
- PSGC: 0201527000
- IDD : area code: +63 (0)78
- Native languages: Ibanag; Ilocano; Itawis; Tagalog
- Website: www.solana-cagayan.gov.ph

Solana, officially the Municipality of Solana (Ibanag: Ili nat Solana; Itawit: Ili/Babalay yo Solana; Ilocano: Ili ti Solana; Tagalog: Bayan ng Solana), is a municipality in the province of Cagayan, Philippines. According to the 2024 census, it has a population of 89,840 people.

The Awidon Mesa Formationa Paleolithic Sites of the municipality, along with the Callao Limestone Formation Paleolithic Sites in neighboring Penablanca, are included in the tentative list of the Philippines for future UNESCO World Heritage Site inscription under the name of Paleolithic Archaeological Sites in Cagayan Valley. The Awidon Mesa Formation has at least 68 Paleolithic sites in which stone tools and fossils of extinct animals that include stegodons, elephants, rhinoceros, and large tortoise were discovered.

== History ==
Formerly part of Tuguegarao, Solana was formally made an independent town on 18 August 1852. It was named after Governor General Juan Antonio de Urbiztondo, Marquis of La Solana. Prior to that it was called Marague, after a rich widower named Francisco Marague who settled in the area and built a stone house. During the Second World War, the barrio of Andarayan was bombed by American planes on 13 June 1945, killing 50 people.

== Geography ==
The Municipality of Solana is surrounded by the following: to the east by the Cagayan River, to the north by Amulung, to the south by Enrile, to the southwest by Kalinga province, and to the northwest by Piat and Tuao.

Solana is situated 10.85 kilometres (6.74 mi) from the provincial capital Tuguegarao, and 485.85 kilometres (301.89 mi) north of the country's capital city of Manila.

=== Topography ===
Solana is mostly flat with mountainous terrain on the central area from Barangay Madarallug going north to Barangay Iraga due to the Barung Anticline and Liwan Syncline.

The municipality is bounded by the Cagayan River to the East, Amulung to the North, Enrile to the South and Municipality of Tuao and Piat to the West.

With its proximity in the Cagayan River, it is usually flooded during typhoon season where the river is usually swollen thus providing a fluvial soil good for farming.

=== Barangays ===
Solana is politically subdivided into 38 barangays. Each barangay consists of puroks while some have sitios.

- Andarayan North
- Andarayan South
- Bangag
- Bantay
- Basi East
- Basi West
- Bauan East
- Bauan West
- Cadaanan
- Calamagui
- Calillauan
- Carilucud
- Cattaran
- Centro Northeast (Poblacion)
- Centro Northwest (Poblacion)
- Centro Southeast (Poblacion)
- Centro Southwest (Poblacion)
- Dassun
- Furagui
- Gadu
- Gen. Eulogio Balao
- Iraga
- Lanna
- Lannig
- Lingu
- Maddarulug (Santo Domingo)
- Maguirig
- Malalam-Malacabibi
- Nabbotuan
- Nangalisan
- Natappian East
- Natappian West
- Padul
- Palao
- Parug-parug
- Pataya
- Sampaguita
- Ubong

=== Climate ===
Just like the general climatic conditions of the Philippines, the municipality of Solana's climate is tropical and maritime. It is characterized by relatively high temperature, high humidity and abundant rainfall.

Based from the Climate Map of PAGASA, the municipality belongs to the Type III Climate with no very pronounced maximum rain period with a dry season lasting only from one to three monthse either from December to February or from March to May.

Climate data for Solana, Cagayan
Month	Jan	Feb	Mar	Apr	May	Jun	Jul	Aug	Sep	Oct	Nov	Dec	Year
Mean daily maximum °C (°F)	25 (77)	26 (79)	28 (82)	31 (88)	32 (90)	31 (88)	31 (88)	30 (86)	30 (86)	28 (82)	27 (81)	25 (77)	29 (84)
Mean daily minimum °C (°F)	21 (70)	21 (70)	22 (72)	23 (73)	24 (75)	25 (77)	24 (75)	25 (77)	24 (75)	23 (73)	23 (73)	22 (72)	23 (74)
Average precipitation mm (inches)	155 (6.1)	113 (4.4)	89 (3.5)	58 (2.3)	127 (5.0)	131 (5.2)	154 (6.1)	184 (7.2)	151 (5.9)	247 (9.7)	221 (8.7)	292 (11.5)	1,922 (75.6)
Average rainy days	19.6	14.8	13.4	12.0	19.4	19.8	23.0	25.0	23.0	19.4	19.1	21.6	230.1
Source: Meteoblue

== Demographics ==
Population census of Solana

Year	Pop.	±% p.a.
1903	8,064	—
1918	11,760	+2.55%
1939	17,166	+1.82%
1948	18,758	+0.99%
1960	27,631	+3.28%
1970	34,172	+2.14%
1975	40,553	+3.49%
1980	46,064	+2.58%

Year	Pop.	±% p.a.
1990	56,366	+2.04%
1995	60,346	+1.29%
2000	67,512	+2.43%
2007	71,475	+0.79%
2010	76,596	+2.55%
2015	82,502	+1.42%
2020	88,445	+1.47%
2024	89,840	+0.38%

Source: Philippine Statistics Authority

In the 2024 census, the population of Solana was 89,840 people, with a density of 380 inhabitants per square kilometre or 980 inhabitants per square mile.

== Economy ==
Poverty incidence of Solana (%)

Source: Philippine Statistics Authority

== Government ==
=== Local government ===
Solana is part of the third legislative district of the province of Cagayan. It is governed by a mayor, designated as its local chief executive, and by a municipal council as its legislative body in accordance with the Local Government Code. The Sangguniang Bayan is composed of the (Municipality) Vice Mayor as Presiding Officer, regular Sanggunian members (Councilors), the President of the Association of Barangay Captains and the President of the Sangguniang Kabataan. They shall exercise and perform the legislative powers and duties as provided for under Republic Act No. 7160, otherwise known as the Local Government Code of 1991. Shall consider and conduct thorough study all matters brought to their attention and consequently pass resolutions, enact ordinances and to introduce recommendations.

=== Elected officials ===
Members of the Municipal Council (2019–2022)
Position	Name
Congressman	Joseph L. Lara
Mayor	Jennalyn P. Carag
Vice-Mayor	Meynard Z. Carag, CPA
Councilors	Francsica F. de Asis
Councilors	Atty. Carlo Paolo G. Lasam
Councilors	Amelia P. Carag
Councilors	James C. Mallillin
Councilors	Ronald C. Cristobal
Councilors	Edilberto A. Edillo
Councilors	Angelina L. Fernandez
Councilors	Atty. Domingo A. Lagundi Jr.

Members of the Municipal Council (2022-2025)
Position	Name
Congressman	Joseph L. Lara
Mayor	Jennalyn P. Carag
Vice-Mayor	Meynard Z. Carag, CPA
Councilors	Ronald C. Cristobal
Councilors	Edilberto A. Edillo
Councilors	James C. Mallillin
Councilors	Francisca F. De Asis
Councilors	Atty. Carlo Paolo G. Lasam
Councilors	Angelina L. Fernandez
Councilors	All B. Ubina
Councilors	Amelia P. Carag

== Education ==
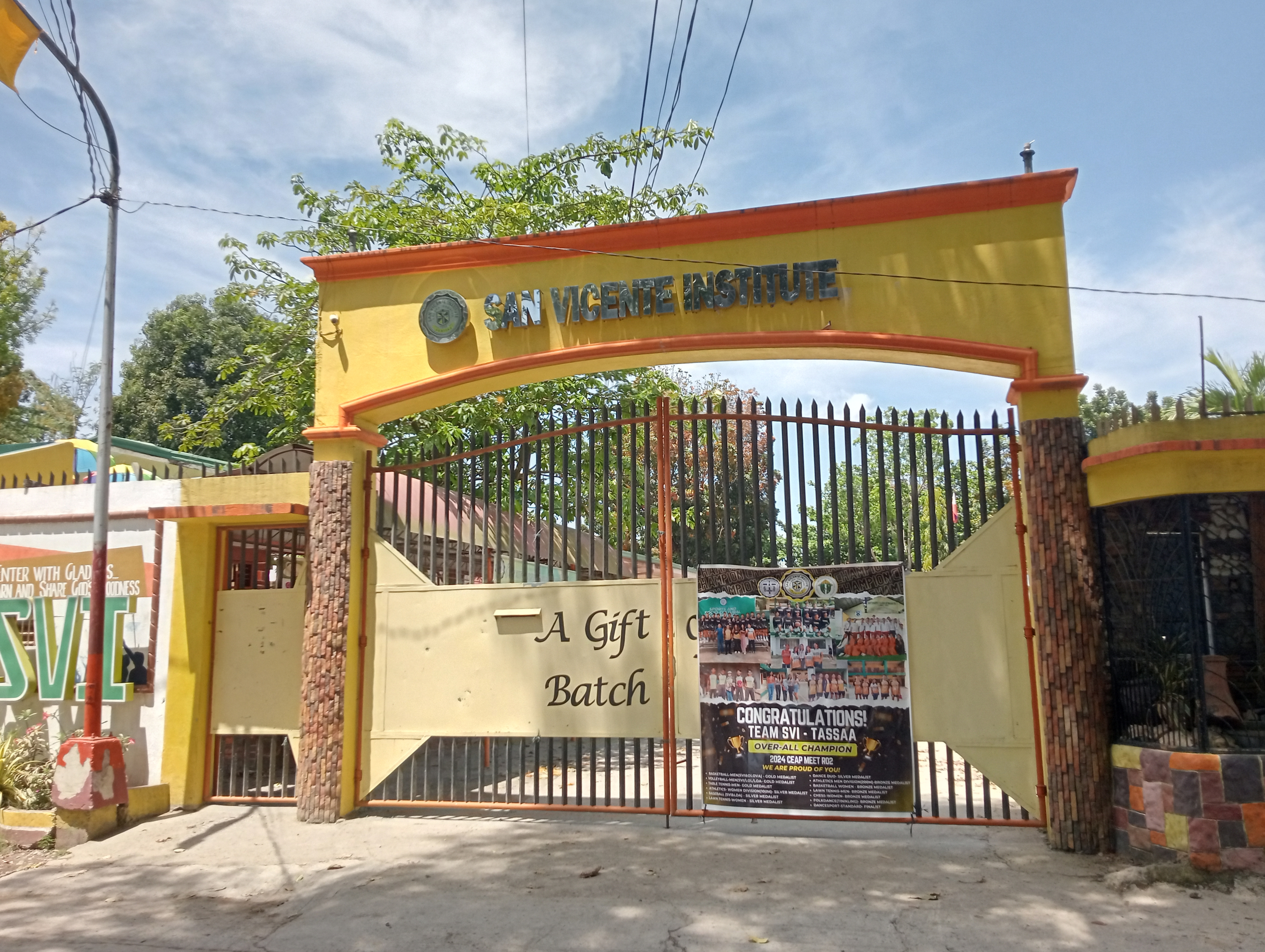
San Vicente Institute

The Schools Division of Cagayan governs the town's public education system. The division office is a field office of the DepEd in Cagayan Valley region.

The Schools Division Office (SDO) of Cagayan was relocated to Solana following a fire that destroyed its original building near the Boy Scouts of the Philippines – Cagayan Chapter Office and Cagayan National High School on August 10, 2012. The following day, the division office was temporarily transferred to the former Department of Public Works and Highways (DPWH) building in Lingu, Solana, Cagayan, where it operated until November 15, 2017.

There are two schools district offices which govern the public and private elementary and high schools throughout the municipality. These are Solana North District, and Solana South District.

The only Catholic School that serves the area is Saint Vincent Ferrer Institute (SVI) under Saint Vincent Ferrer Parish which offers basic education from elementary to senior high school.

=== Primary and elementary schools ===
- Andarayan Elementary School
- Bangag Integrated School
- Bantay Elementary School
- Basi Elementary School
- Bauan Elementary School
- Cagayan Valley Dynamic Christian Global School
- Cadaanan Integrated School
- Calillauan Elementary School
- Carilucud Elementary School
- Casa Dei Bambini School
- Cattaran Elementary School
- Damortis Integrated School
- Dassun Elementary School
- Door of Faith Christian Learning School
- Gadu Elementary School
- General Balao Elementary School
- Iraga Elementary School
- Lanna Elementary School
- Lannig Elementary School
- Lingu Elementary School
- Little Jesus Christian Academy Cadaanan Branch
- Little Jesus Christian Academy Dassun Branch
- Maddarulug Elementary School
- Malacabibi Elementary School
- Masin-San Pablo Elementary School
- Maguirig Elementary School
- Nabbotuan Elementary School
- Nangalisan Elementary School
- Natappian Elementary School
- Padul Elementary School
- Palao Elementary School
- Parog-Parog Integrated School
- Pataya Elementary School
- Saint Vincent Ferrer Institute (Primary to Elementary)
- Solana North Central School
- Solana South Central School
- Solana West Central School
- The Natappian United Methodist Mission School
- Turod Elementary School
- Ubong Elementary School
- Villa Salud Elementary School

=== Secondary schools ===
- Andarayan National High School
- Dassun National High School
- Gadu National High School
- Sampaguita National High School
- Solana National High School
- Saint Vincent Ferrer Institute
- Solana Academy
- Solana Fresh Water Fishery School

=== Higher educational institution ===
There is a state university which is an extension campus of Cagayan State University which offer academic programs in Teacher Education, Agriculture, Fisheries, Information and Computing Sciences, and Criminology.

- Cagayan State University

== Gallery ==
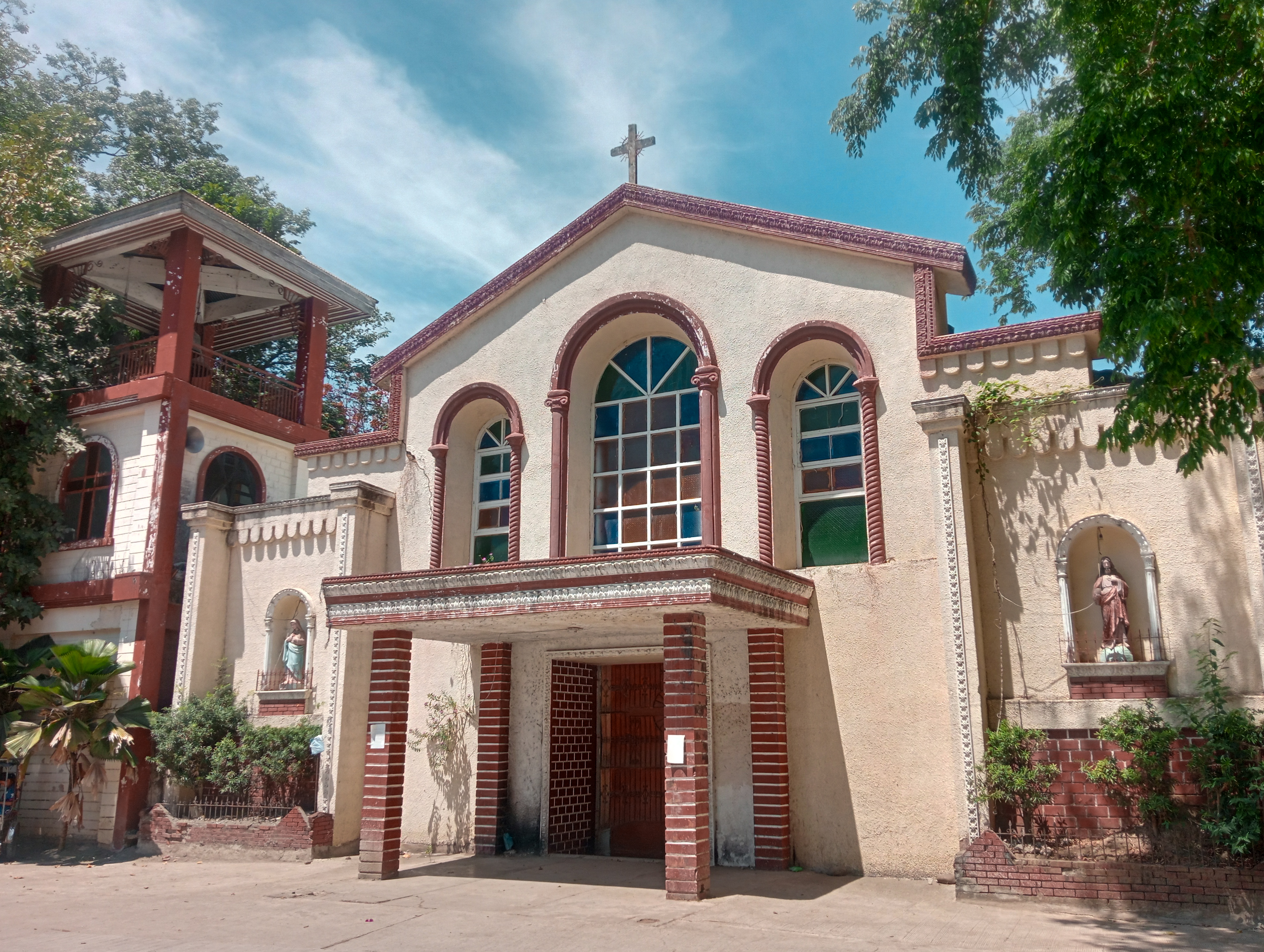
Old Solana Church

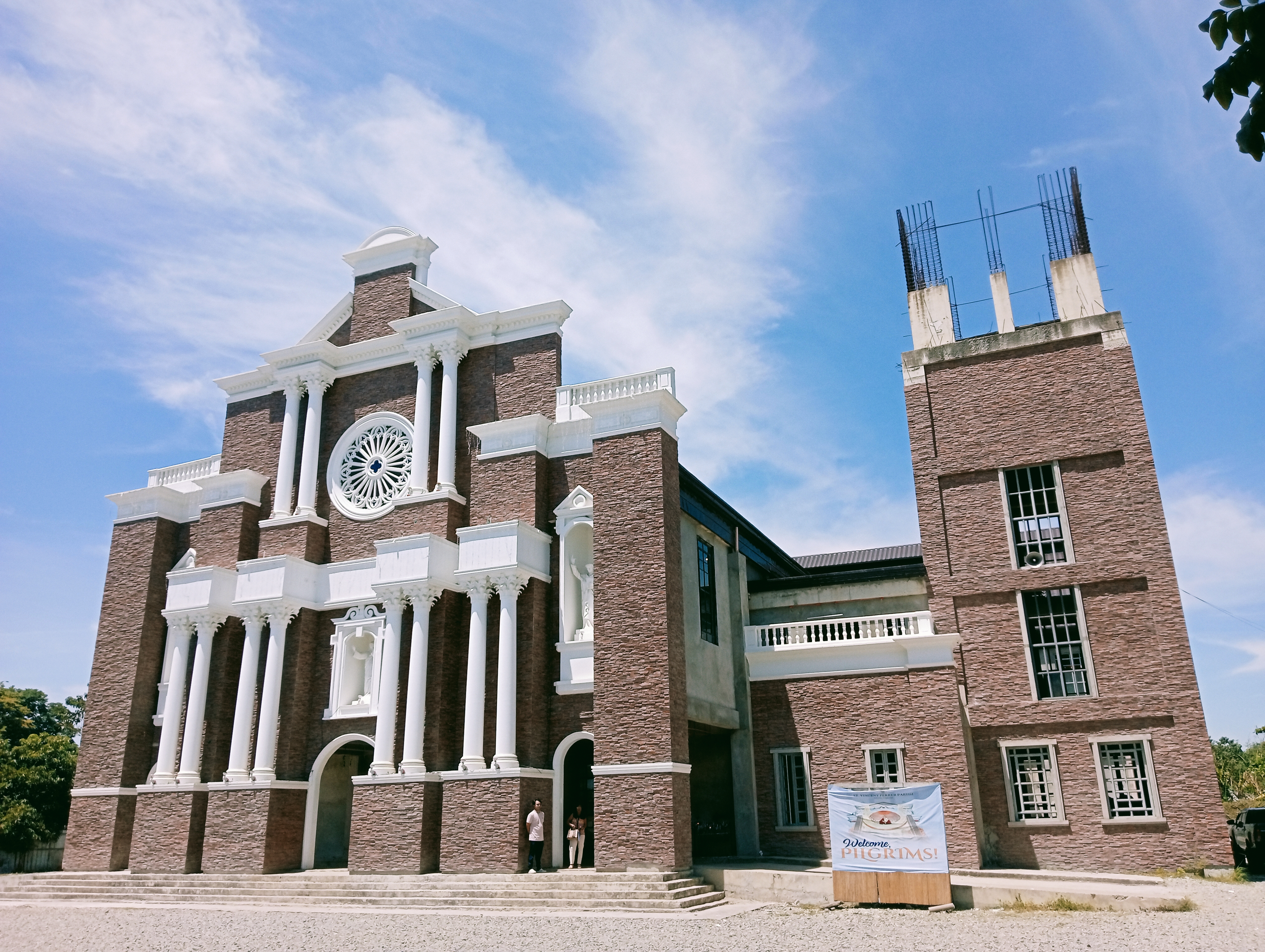
New Solana Church

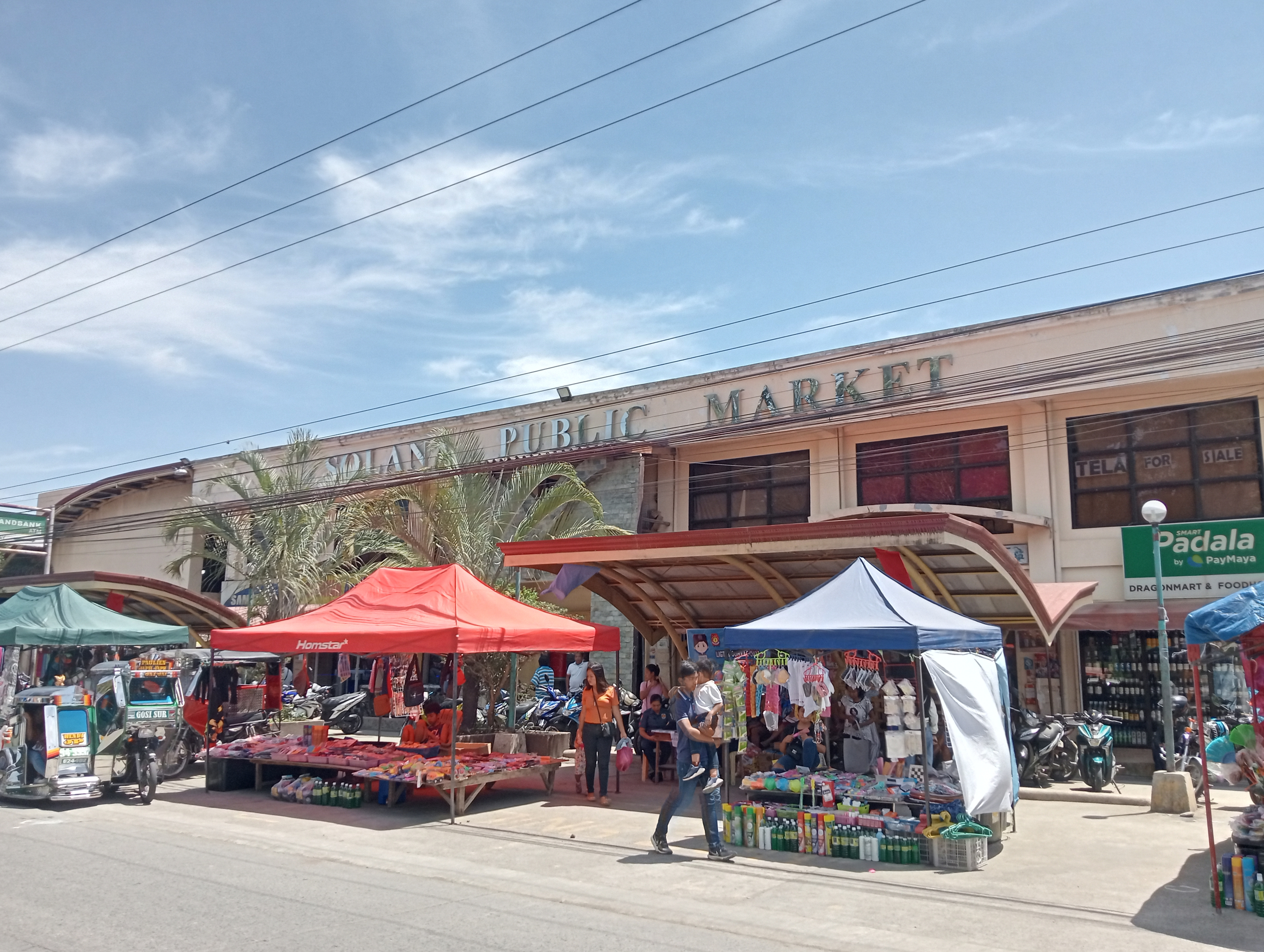
Solana Public Market

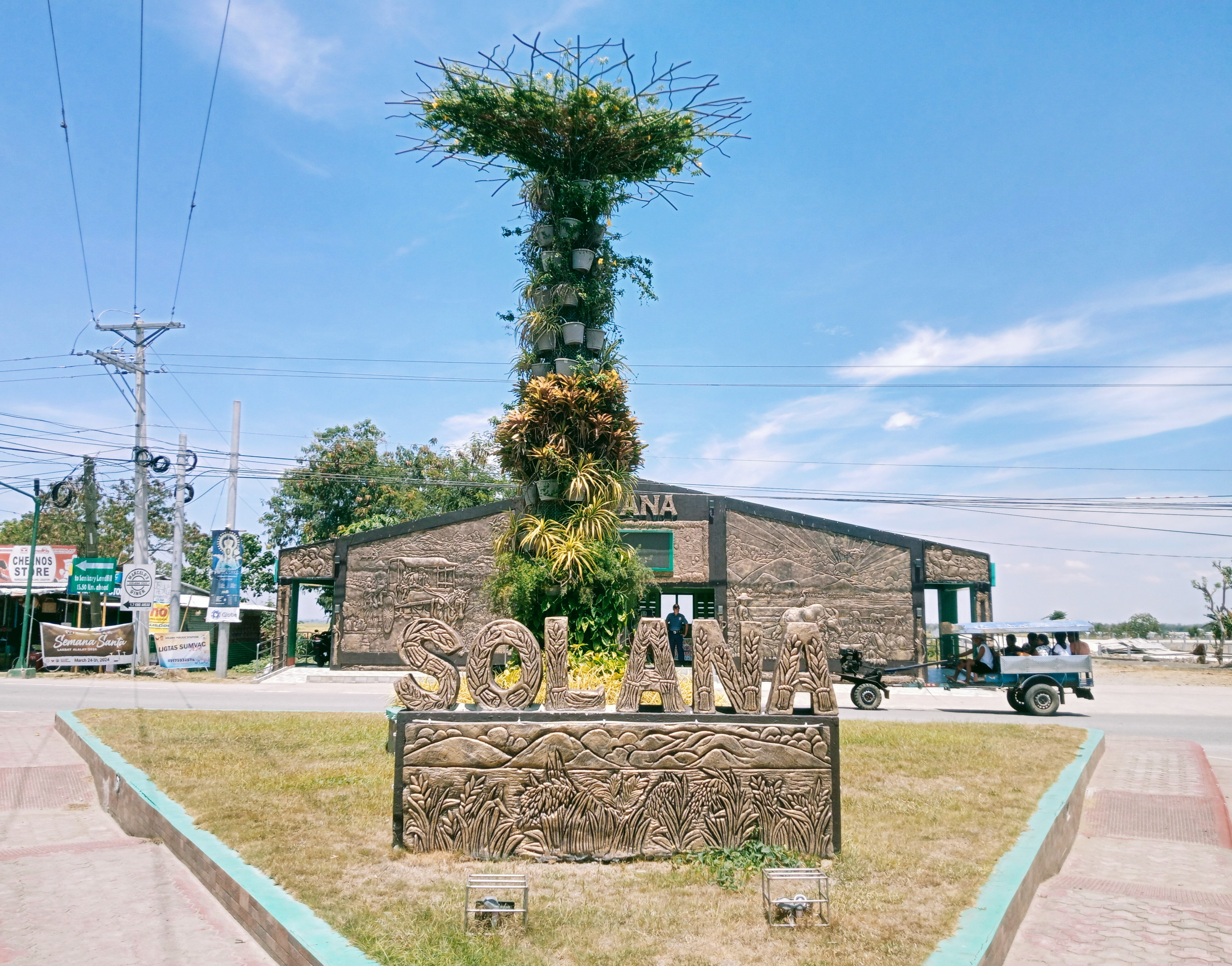
Solana Junction
