= List of radio stations in Southern Tagalog =

The following is a list of NTC-licensed radio stations in Southern Tagalog, which includes the current regions of Calabarzon and Mimaropa regions in the Philippines, current as of 2025. The table can be sorted by call sign, frequency, location, owner, name, languages and radio format. Also included below are defunct radio stations and Internet-only stations.

== Radio stations ==
Call sign	Branding	Frequency	Location	Owner	RDS ID	Language	Format
DWAL	Radyo Totoo Batangas	95.9 FM	Batangas City	Archdiocese of Lipa (Catholic Media Network)		Tagalog	Roman Catholic religious broadcasting
DWAM	Spirit FM Batangas	99.1 FM	Batangas City	Archdiocese of Lipa (Catholic Media Network)		Tagalog	masa/contemporary MOR, original Pilipino music Roman Catholic religious broadcasting
DWAN-FM	Home Radio Palawan	94.3 FM	Puerto Princesa	Aliw Broadcasting Corporation		English	soft AC
DWAR-FM	K5 News FM Puerto Princesa	103.9 FM	Puerto Princesa	5K Broadcasting Network		Tagalog	contemporary MOR, OPM, News,
DWBC-FM	Radyo Biñan	87.9 FM	Biñan, Laguna	City of Biñan		Tagalog	community radio
DWBJ	Brigada News FM Roxas	100.5 FM	Roxas, Palawan	Baycomms Broadcasting Corporation (operated by Brigada Mass Media Corporation)		Tagalog	news/talk, masa/contemporary MOR
DWBP	Brigada News FM Brooke's Point	95.7 FM	Brooke's Point, Palawan	Baycomms Broadcasting Corporation (operated by Brigada Mass Media Corporation)		Tagalog	news/talk, masa/contemporary MOR
DWCH	Air1 Radio	91.9 FM	Batangas City	Iddes Broadcast Group		Tagalog	masa/contemporary MOR, original Pilipino music
DWCK	Palawan Island Network	96.7 FM	Puerto Princesa, Palawan	Presidential Broadcast Service (operated by Provincial Government of Palawan)		Tagalog	news/talk, masa/contemporary MOR
DWCO	XFM Quezon	103.1 FM	Candelaria, Quezon	Christian Music Power Inc. (operated by Y2H Broadcasting Network)		Tagalog	masa/contemporary MOR, original Pilipino music
DWCO	Radyo Natin Calapan	96.9 FM	Calapan, Oriental Mindoro	MBC Media Group		Tagalog	community radio (Radyo Natin), masa/contemporary MOR
DWDO	Care FM San Jose	102.5 FM	San Jose, Occidental Mindoro	Presidential Broadcast Service		Tagalog	masa/contemporary MOR, original Pilipino music news talk
DWDG	Spirit FM Gumaca	91.7 FM	Gumaca, Quezon	Diocese of Gumaca (Catholic Media Network)		Tagalog	Roman Catholic religious broadcasting
DWDI	AgriPinoy Radyo	101.7 FM	Tagkawayan, Quezon	Department of Agriculture		Tagalog	news/talk
DWDS	Animo! FM	106.1 FM	Lipa, Batangas	De La Salle Lipa		English	campus radio
DWDW	Prime FM Palawan	88.7 FM	Puerto Princesa, Palawan	Prime Broadcasting Network		Tagalog	masa/contemporary MOR, original Pilipino music news talk
DWEJ	Cool 101.5	101.5 FM	Lucena	UBC Global Media Ministries		English, Tagalog	Evangelical religious broadcasting, CCM
DWEY	Brigada News FM Batangas	104.7 FM	Batangas City	Baycomms Broadcasting Corporation (operated by Brigada Mass Media Corporation)	BRIGADA	Tagalog	news/talk, masa/contemporary MOR
DWGA	Radyo Bataraza	101.1 FM	Bataraza, Palawan	Palawan Council for Sustainable Development		Tagalog	news/talk, masa/contemporary MOR
DWGM	Charm Radio Romblon	100.5 FM	Romblon, Romblon	Polytechnic Foundation of Cotabato & Asia		Tagalog	news/talk, masa/contemporary MOR
DWGQ	Radyo Serbisyo	93.3 FM	Gumaca, Quezon	Gumaca Communications and Management Services (Presidential Broadcast Service affiliate)		Tagalog	news/talk, Public Affairs
DWGR	Radyo Natin Gumaca	107.9 FM	Gumaca, Quezon	MBC Media Group		Tagalog	community radio (Radyo Natin)
DWHQ	AR FM	98.1 FM	Baco, Oriental Mindoro	Hypersonic Broadcasting Center		Tagalog	masa/contemporary MOR, OPM, news/talk
DWJO	Spirit FM Infanta	92.7 FM	Infanta, Quezon	Catholic Media Network		Tagalog	masa/contemporary MOR, original Pilipino music Roman Catholic religious broadcasting
DWKE	Love FM Lucena	98.5 FM	Lucena	Kaissar Broadcasting Network		Tagalog	masa/contemporary MOR, original Pilipino music
DWKI	Kiss FM Lucena	95.1 FM	Lucena	DCG Radio-TV Network		Tagalog	masa/contemporary MOR, OPM, news/talk
DWKL	Brigada News FM Lucena	92.7 FM	Lucena	Baycomms Broadcasting Corporation (Brigada Mass Media Corporation)	BRIGADA	Tagalog	news/talk, masa/contemporary MOR
DWKV	Tricab Infinity FM	102.3 FM	Lipa, Batangas	Tricab Media Productions, Kaissar Broadcasting Network		Tagalog	news/talk, masa/contemporary MOR, original Pilipino music
DWLC-AM	Radyo Pilipinas Lucena	1017 AM	Lucena	Presidential Broadcast Service		Tagalog	news/talk
DWLC-FM	Radyo Natin Lemery	102.3 FM	Lemery, Batangas	MBC Media Group	RADYO NATIN	Tagalog	community radio (Radyo Natin)
DWLD	DCG FM Batangas	88.7 FM	Lipa, Batangas	DCG Radio-TV Network		Tagalog	Original Pilipino music
DZDG	Destiny Radio	96.7 FM	Lucena	Caceres Broadcasting Corporation		Tagalog	news, talk, masa/contemporary MOR
DWLW	Love Radio Lucena	100.7 FM	Lucena	MBC Media Group	100.7LOVE	Tagalog	masa/contemporary MOR
DWMC	DWMC 107.3	107.3 FM	San Pablo, Laguna	San Pablo Colleges		English, Tagalog	campus radio
DWMD	Radyo Natin Marinduque	104.5 FM	Santa Cruz, Marinduque	MBC Media Group	RADYO NATIN	Tagalog	community radio (Radyo Natin), masa/contemporary MOR
DWME	Radyo Natin Sablayan	103.3 FM	Sablayan, Occidental Mindoro	MBC Media Group		Tagalog	community radio (Radyo Natin), masa/contemporary MOR
DWMH	Radyo Natin Bongabong	103.7 FM	Bongabong, Oriental Mindoro	MBC Media Group		Tagalog	community radio (Radyo Natin), masa/contemporary MOR
DWMI	Radyo Natin Brooke's Point	104.5 FM	Brooke's Point, Palawan	MBC Media Group		Tagalog	community radio (Radyo Natin),
DWMJ	Radyo Natin Naujan	102.9 FM	Naujan, Oriental Mindoro	MBC Media Group		Tagalog	community radio (Radyo Natin), masa/contemporary MOR
DWMK	Radyo Natin Pinamalayan	105.3 FM	Pinamalayan, Oriental Mindoro	MBC Media Group	RADYO NATIN	Tagalog	community radio (Radyo Natin), masa/contemporary MOR
DWML	Radyo Natin Atimonan	106.5 FM	Atimonan, Quezon	MBC Media Group	RADYO NATIN	Tagalog	community radio (Radyo Natin)
DWMM	Radyo Natin Looc	104.5 FM	Looc, Romblon	MBC Media Group	RADYO NATIN	Tagalog, Onhan	community radio (Radyo Natin), masa/contemporary MOR
DWMR	Radyo Pilipinas Palawan	648 AM	Puerto Princesa	Presidential Broadcast Service		Tagalog	news/talk
DWMZ	Magik FM Lucena	90.3 FM	Lucena	Century Broadcasting Network		Tagalog	masa/contemporary MOR, news
DWNG	Gospel Radio Lucena	97.5 FM	Lucena	North Philippine Union Conference (United Church of Christ in the Philippines)		English, Tagalog	religious broadcasting
DWNG	Radyo Kapalayawan	100.1 FM	Paluan, Occidental Mindoro	National Nutrition Council (operated by Municipality of Paluan)		Tagalog	community radio (Nutriskwela Community Radio)
DWOX	Radyo Natin Roxas	98.9 FM	Roxas, Oriental Mindoro	MBC Media Group	RADYO NATIN	Tagalog	community radio (Radyo Natin), masa/contemporary MOR
DWPB-FM	BatStateU Radio	107.3 FM	Batangas City	Batangas State University		English, Tagalog	campus radio
DWQL	Barangay LS Lucena	91.1 FM	Lucena	GMA Network	BRGY LS	Tagalog	masa/contemporary MOR
DWRH	Radyo Natin Lucban	104.5 FM	Lucban, Quezon	MBC Media Group	RADYO NATIN	Tagalog	community radio (Radyo Natin)
DWRI	Radyo Natin Infanta	105.3 FM	Infanta, Quezon	MBC Media Group	RADYO NATIN	Tagalog	community radio (Radyo Natin)
DWRL	Radyo Natin Calauag	100.9 FM	Calauag, Quezon	MBC Media Group	RADYO NATIN	Tagalog	community radio (Radyo Natin)
DWRM	Radyo Natin San Jose	101.7 FM	San Francisco, Occidental Mindoro	MBC Media Group	RADYO NATIN	Tagalog	community radio (Radyo Natin), masa/contemporary MOR
DWRO	Radyo Natin Roxas	101.3 FM	Roxas, Palawan	MBC Media Group	RADYO NATIN	Tagalog	community radio (Radyo Natin)
DWRZ	Radyo Natin Coron	100.5 FM	Coron, Palawan	MBC Media Group	RADYO NATIN	Tagalog	community radio (Radyo Natin)
DWSJ	Bambi FM San Jose	97.7 FM	San Jose, Occidental Mindoro	Tamaraw Broadcasting Corporation		Tagalog	news, hot adult contemporary
DWSR-AM (DZRH relay)	DZRH Lucena	1224 AM	Lucena	MBC Media Group		Tagalog	news/talk
DWSU-FM	95.9 Green FM	95.9 FM	Dasmariñas, Cavite	De La Salle University Dasmariñas		English, Tagalog	campus radio
DWTI	DWTI 972	972 AM	Lucena	DCG Radio-TV Network		Tagalog	news/talk
DWVM	Spirit FM Lucena	103.9 FM	Lucena	Diocese of Lucena (Catholic Media Network)		Tagalog	masa/contemporary MOR, Roman Catholic religious broadcasting
DWWA	Radyo Cabayugan Puerto Princesa	98.5 FM	Puerto Princesa	Palawan Council for Sustainable Development		Tagalog	news/talk, masa/contemporary MOR
DWXF	XFM Palawan	104.7 FM	Puerto Princesa	Gateway UHF Broadcasting (operated by Y2H Broadcasting Network)		Tagalog	masa/contemporary MOR, news/talk
DWYD	Brigada News FM Puerto Princesa	103.1 FM	Puerto Princesa	Baycomms Broadcasting Corporation (operates by Brigada Mass Media Corporation)	BRIGADA	Tagalog	news/talk, masa/contemporary MOR
DWYB	Brigada News FM Quezon	98.3 FM	Quezon, Palawan	Brigada Mass Media Corporation		Tagalog	news/talk, masa/contemporary MOR
DWZB-FM	91.1 Light FM	91.1 FM	Puerto Princesa	ZOE Broadcasting Network		English, Tagalog	Evangelical religious broadcasting
DYEA	Radyo Bandera Española	99.7 FM	Sofronio Española, Palawan	Bandera News Philippines		Tagalog	news/talk, masa/contemporary MOR
DYEZ-FM	Love Radio Palawan	98.3 FM	Puerto Princesa	MBC Media Group	98.3LOVE	Tagalog	masa/contemporary MOR
DYFB-FM	Radyo Cagayancillo	89.5 FM	Cagayancillo, Palawan	Municipality of Cagayancillo		Tagalog, Cuyonon	community radio
DYFJ (DZRJ-FM relay)	RJFM Palawan	99.1 FM	Puerto Princesa	Rajah Broadcasting Network		English	adult hits
DYHY-FM	Barangay FM Palawan	97.5 FM	Puerto Princesa	GMA Network	BRGY FM	Tagalog	masa/contemporary MOR
DYPH (DZRH relay)	DZRH Palawan	693 AM	Puerto Princesa	MBC Media Group		Tagalog	news/talk
DYQS	One FM Palawan	95.1 FM	Puerto Princesa	Radyo Pilipino Corporation		Tagalog	top 40/CHR
DYSP	Super Radyo DYSP	909 AM	Puerto Princesa	GMA Network		Tagalog	news/talk
DZAS-FM	Supreme FM Tagkawayan	98.1 FM	Tagkawayan, Quezon	Presidential Broadcast Service		Tagalog	news/talk
DZAT	Life Radio Lucena	1512 AM	Lucena	End Times Mission Broadcasting Service		English, Tagalog	Evangelical religious broadcasting
DZBI	Brigada News FM Narra	96.5 FM	Narra, Palawan	Baycomms Broadcasting Corporation (operated by Brigada Mass Media Corporation)		Tagalog	news/talk, masa/contemporary MOR
DZBR	Bible Radio	531 AM	Tanauan, Batangas	Allied Broadcasting Center		English	Evangelical religious broadcasting (Cathedral of Praise)
DZCT	Super Tunog Pinoy	105.3 FM	Lucena	DCG Radio-TV Network		Tagalog	full-service radio, original Pilipino music
DZEL	Radyo Agila Lucena	1260 AM	Lucena	Eagle Broadcasting Corporation		Tagalog	religious broadcasting (Iglesia ni Cristo)
DZGV	GV 99.9	99.9 FM	Batangas City	Apollo Broadcast Investors	GV 99.9	English, Tagalog	top 40/CHR
DZIP	DZIP Radyo Palaweño	864 AM	Puerto Princesa	iTransmission Inc.		Tagalog	news/talk
DZJV	Radyo Calabarzon	1458 AM	Calamba, Laguna	ZOE Broadcasting Network		English	Evangelical religious broadcasting
DZLB-AM	Radyo DZLB	1116 AM	Los Baños, Laguna	University of the Philippines Los Baños		Tagalog	campus radio
DZLC	98.5 Cool FM	98.5 FM	Lipa, Batangas	Apollo Broadcast Investors		Tagalog	news/talk
DZLQ	One FM Lucena	98.3 FM	Lucena	Radyo Pilipino Corporation		Tagalog	masa/contemporary MOR
DZLT-AM	Radyo Pilipino Lucena	1188 AM	Lucena	Radyo Pilipino Corporation		Tagalog	news/talk
DZNE-FM	Radyo Kasimanwa	97.3 FM	Coron, Palawan	National Nutrition Council (operated by Palawan State University and Municipality of Coron)		Tagalog	community radio (Nutriskwela Community Radio)
DZNG	Radyo Kaisahan	107.7 FM	Sariaya, Quezon	National Nutrition Council (operated by Municipality of Sariaya)		Tagalog	community radio (Nutriskwela Community Radio)
DZNI	Radyo Kaunlaran	99.7 FM	Bansud, Oriental Mindoro	National Nutrition Council (operated by Municipality of Bansud and Polytechnic University of the Philippines - Bansud)		Tagalog	community radio (Nutriskwela Community Radio)
DZNS	Radyo Kamalindig	94.5 FM	Buenavista, Marinduque	National Nutrition Council (operated by Municipality of Buenavista)		Tagalog	community radio (Nutriskwela Community Radio)
DZRK	Radyo Kapit Bisig	102.3 FM	Quezon, Palawan	Far East Broadcasting Company		Tagalog	Evangelical religious broadcasting
DZRT	Palawan Wave FM	91.9 FM	Puerto Princesa			Tagalog	community radio
DZVA	Radyo Natin Laguna	106.3 FM	Calamba, Laguna	MBC Media Group	RADYO NATIN	Tagalog	community radio (Radyo Natin)
DZVB	Radyo Natin BonPen	102.5 FM	Catanauan, Quezon	MBC Media Group	RADYO NATIN	Tagalog	community radio (Radyo Natin)
DZVG	Radyo Natin Odiongan	101.3 FM	Odiongan, Romblon	MBC Media Group	RADYO NATIN	Tagalog, Asi	community radio (Radyo Natin), masa/contemporary MOR
DZVH	Radyo Natin Boac	105.7 FM	Boac, Marinduque	MBC Media Group	RADYO NATIN	Tagalog	community radio (Radyo Natin), masa/contemporary MOR
DZVI	Radyo Natin Batangas	105.5 FM	Padre Garcia, Batangas	MBC Media Group	RADYO NATIN	Tagalog	community radio (Radyo Natin)
DZVT-AM	Radyo Totoo Mindoro	1395 AM	San Jose, Occidental Mindoro	Apostolic Vicariate of San Jose in Mindoro (Catholic Media Network)		Tagalog	Roman Catholic religious broadcasting
DZYM-AM	Radyo Pilipino Mindoro	1539 AM	San Jose, Occidental Mindoro	Radyo Pilipino Corporation		Tagalog	community radio
TBD	Smile FM Puerto Princesa	90.3 FM	Puerto Princesa	Palawan Broadcasting Corporation (operated by Bandera News Philippines)		Tagalog	news/talk, masa/contemporary MOR
TBD	Radyo Tandikan El Nido	96.7 FM	El Nido, Palawan			Tagalog	community radio
TBD	Power FM Puerto Princesa	107.1 FM	Puerto Princesa	Power Zip Broadcasting Service		Tagalog	community radio
TBD	Brigada News FM Cuyo	98.9 FM	Cuyo, Palawan	Baycomms Broadcasting Corporation (operated by Brigada Mass Media Corporation)		Tagalog	news/talk, masa/contemporary MOR
TBD	Brigada News FM Coron	101.3 FM	Coron, Palawan	Baycomms Broadcasting Corporation (operated by Brigada Mass Media Corporation)		Tagalog	news/talk, masa/contemporary MOR
TBD	Radyo Bandera Coron	88.7 FM	Coron, Palawan	Palawan Broadcasting Corporation (operated by Bandera News Philippines)		Tagalog	news/talk, masa/contemporary MOR
TBD	Radyo Bandera Brooke's Point	89.5 FM	Brooke's Point, Palawan	Palawan Broadcasting Corporation (operated by Bandera News Philippines)		Tagalog	news/talk, masa/contemporary MOR
TBD	Radyo Bandera Quezon	91.1 FM	Quezon, Palawan	Palawan Broadcasting Corporation (operated by Bandera News Philippines)		Tagalog	news/talk, masa/contemporary MOR
TBD	Radyo Bandera Roxas	93.9 FM	Roxas, Palawan	Palawan Broadcasting Corporation (operated by Bandera News Philippines)		Tagalog	news/talk, masa/contemporary MOR
TBD	Radyo Bandera Rio Tuba	94.5 FM	Bataraza, Palawan	Palawan Broadcasting Corporation (operated by Bandera News Philippines)		Tagalog	news/talk, masa/contemporary MOR
TBD	Radyo Bandera Narra	107.1 FM	Narra, Palawan	Palawan Broadcasting Corporation (operated by Bandera News Philippines)		Tagalog	news/talk, masa/contemporary MOR
TBD	Radyo Bandera San Vicente	107.1 FM	San Vicente, Palawan	Palawan Broadcasting Corporation (operated by Bandera News Philippines)		Tagalog	news/talk, masa/contemporary MOR
TBD	XFM Brooke's Point	93.5 FM	Brooke's Point, Palawan	Y2H Broadcasting Network Inc.		English	masa/contemporary MOR, news/talk
TBD	XFM Narra	105.6 FM	Narra, Palawan	Y2H Broadcasting Network Inc.		English	masa/contemporary MOR, news/talk
TBD	Solid FM Palawan	95.5 FM	Puerto Princesa, Palawan	Y2H Broadcasting Network Inc.		English	soft adult contemporary
TBD	XFM Roxas	97.1 FM	Roxas, Palawan	Y2H Broadcasting Network Inc.		Tagalog	masa/contemporary MOR, news/talk
TBD	XFM Bataraza	91.8 FM	Bataraza, Palawan	Y2H Broadcasting Network Inc.		Tagalog	masa/contemporary MOR, news/talk
TBD	XFM Quezon	91.6 FM	Quezon, Palawan	Y2H Broadcasting Network Inc.		Tagalog	masa/contemporary MOR, news/talk
TBD	XFM Rizal	103.5 FM	Rizal, Palawan	Y2H Broadcasting Network Inc.		Tagalog	masa/contemporary MOR, news/talk
TBD	XFM Cuyo	97.9 FM	Cuyo, Palawan	Y2H Broadcasting Network Inc.		Tagalog	masa/contemporary MOR, news/talk
TBD	XFM San Vicente	103.5 FM	San Vicente, Palawan	Y2H Broadcasting Network Inc.		Tagalog	masa/contemporary MOR, news/talk
TBD	XFM Coron	93.5 FM	Coron, Palawan	Y2H Broadcasting Network Inc.		Tagalog	masa/contemporary MOR, news/talk
TBD	XFM El Nido	91.5 FM	El Nido, Palawan	Y2H Broadcasting Network Inc.		Tagalog	masa/contemporary MOR, news/talk
TBD	XFM Abongan	105.1 FM	Taytay, Palawan	Y2H Broadcasting Network Inc.		Tagalog	masa/contemporary MOR, news/talk
TBD	Care FM Mamburao	102.3 FM	Mamburao, Occidental Mindoro	Presidential Broadcast Service		Tagalog	masa/contemporary MOR, news/talk
TBD	iFM Lucena	106.3 FM	Lucena	Radio Mindanao Network		Tagalog	masa/contemporary MOR, OPM
TBD	Care FM Sablayan	87.5 FM	Sablayan, Occidental Mindoro	Presidential Broadcast Service		Tagalog	masa/contemporary MOR, news/talk
government-owned station; Station under NTC provisional authority and/or on test broadcast.

== Defunct ==
- DWAL-AM
- DWAW-AM
- DWKV (as CityBeat 102.3)
- DWQP
- DYAP-AM
- DYCU
- DYEA
- DZWI
- DWLM (as Gospel Radio 96.7)
- DWOK
