= DWCD-FM =

DWCD (97.9 WCD)
- Mandaluyong; Philippines
- Broadcast area: Metro Manila
- Frequency: 97.9 MHz
- Branding: 97.9 WCD/97.9 Crusaders FM

Programming
- Format: Silent (see DWQZ)

Ownership
- Owner: Crusaders Broadcasting System
- Sister stations: DWAD 1098

History
- First air date: 1982
- Last air date: 1994 (expired in 1997)
- Call sign meaning: CrusaDers or Cesar A. Dumlao (owner)

Technical information
- Power: 25,000 watts

DWCD (97.9 FM) was a radio station owned and operated by Crusaders Broadcasting System. Its radio transmitter and studios were located at Shaw Boulevard, Mandaluyong from 1982 to 1994 and on 209 E. Dela Paz, Mandaluyong since 1995.

== History ==
After the launch of DWAD in July 1973, 97.9 Crusaders FM made its inaugural broadcast in April 1982, and it played pop, mellow, OPM and Christian music. It had temporary permits in January 1994 and then in May 1996.

In May 1997, the station ceased operations because the Broadcast Service Division of the National Telecommunications Commission recommended the cancellation and revocation of the permit of Crusaders due to a case filed by ConAmor Broadcasting Systems (now DCG Radio-TV Network). In August 1997, the 97.9 MHz FM frequency was assigned to Aliw Broadcasting Corporation, which had begun test broadcasts on the frequency on September 28, 1994 under the callsign DWQZ.

== See also ==
- DWAD
- Aliw Broadcasting Corporation
- 979 Home Radio Manila
