= DYPR =

DYPR may refer to the following Philippine broadcast stations:

- A callsign used by Palawan Broadcasting Corporation in Palawan:
  - DYAP-AM, a defunct AM radio station broadcasting in Puerto Princesa previously used the callsign DYPR-AM
  - DYPR-TV (Palawan), a television station in Puerto Princesa, Palawan
- DYPR-TV, a television station broadcasting in Tacloban as PRTV
