= DXFK =

Tagum; Philippines
- Broadcast area: Davao del Norte
- Frequency: 92.9 MHz

Programming
- Format: Silent

Ownership
- Owner: Bandera News Philippines; (Palawan Broadcasting Corporation)

History
- First air date: 2019
- Last air date: 2024
- Former names: Radyo Bandera Davao Region (2019-2024)

Technical information
- Licensing authority: NTC

DXFK (92.9 FM) was a radio station owned and operated by Bandera News Philippines. It was formerly under the Radyo Bandera News FM network from its inception in 2019 to the first quarter of 2024, when it went off the air due to lack of advertisers.
