= Mark (unit) =

Medieval European unit of mass or weight

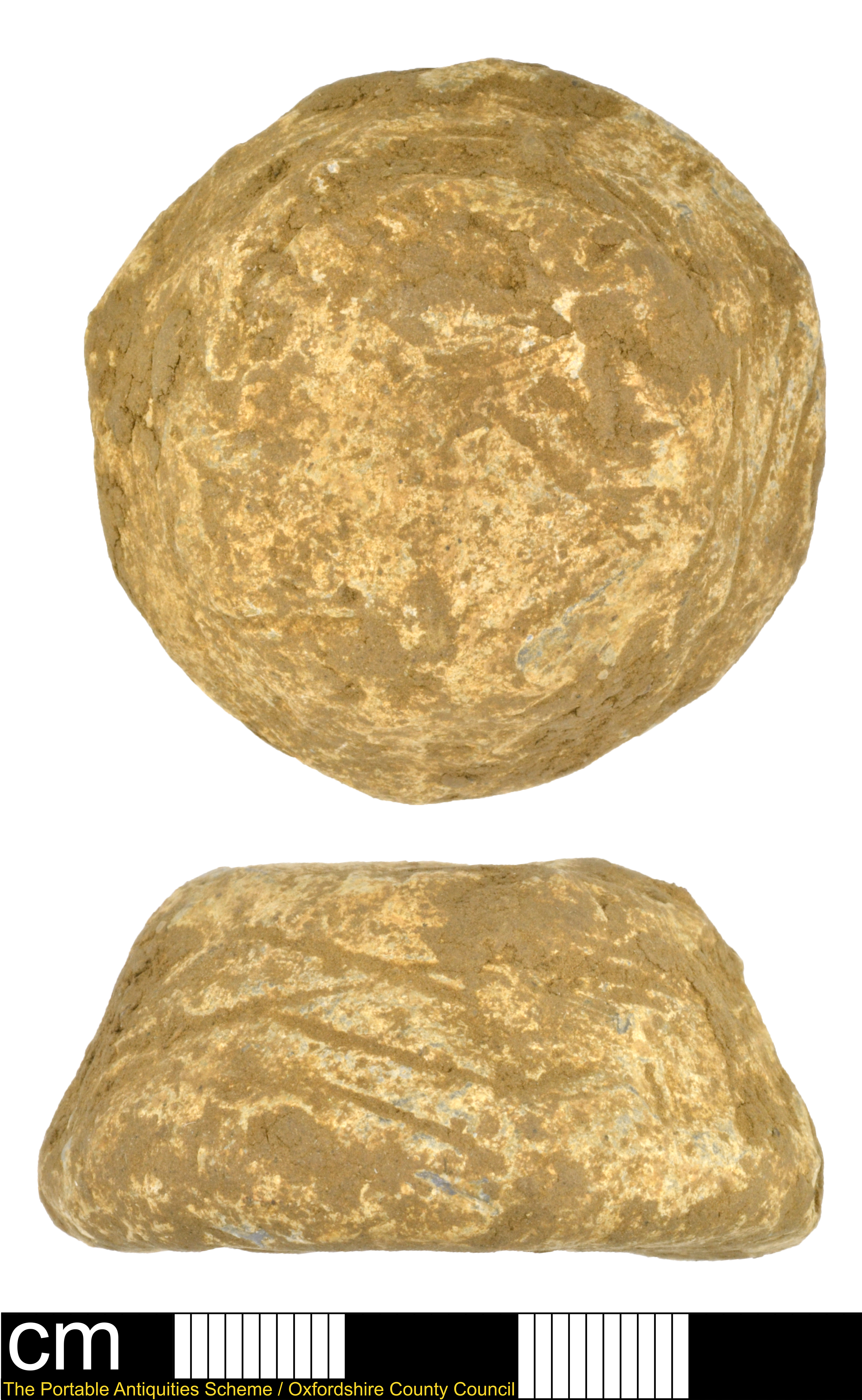
Lead weight of 234 grams (1 mark), found in Oxfordshire.

The mark (from Middle High German: marc, march, brand) is originally a medieval weight or mass unit, which supplanted the pound weight as a precious metals and coinage weight in parts of Europe in the 11th century. The Mark is traditionally divided into 8 ounces or 16 lots. The Cologne mark corresponded to about 234 g (7.5 ozt).

Like the German systems, the French poids de marc weight system considered one marc equal to 8 troy ounces.

Just as the pound of 12 troy ounces (373 g) lent its name to the pound unit of currency, the mark lent its name to the mark unit of currency.

== Origin of the term ==
The Etymological Dictionary of the German Language by Friedrich Kluge derives the word from the Proto-Germanic term marka, "weight and value unit" (originally "division, shared").

The etymological dictionary by Wolfgang Pfeifer sees the Old High German marc, "delimitation, sign", as the stem and assumes that marc originally meant "minting" (marking of a certain weight), later denoting the ingot itself and its weight, and finally a coin of a certain weight and value.

According to an 1848 trade lexicon, the term Gewichtsmark comes from the fact that "the piece of metal used for weighing was stamped with a sign or symbol". Meyer's 1905 Konversationslexikon similarly derives the origin of the word to the emergence of the mark from the Roman pound of 11 ounces. Charlemagne, as King of the Franks, carried out a monetary and measures reform towards the end of the 8th century. In particular, he had introduced the Karlspfund ("Charles pound") as the basic unit of coinage and trade which, however, weighed only 8 ounces. In order to prevent a further reduction in the weight of a pound, a sign, the mark, was now stamped on the new weights. The actual weight of these weights, known as marca, is said to have fluctuated between 196 g and 280 g.
