= DWII-FM =

Radio station in Legazpi, Philippines

Radyo Oragon (DWII)
- Legazpi; Philippines
- Broadcast area: Albay and surrounding areas
- Frequency: 90.7 MHz
- Branding: 90.7 Radyo Oragon

Programming
- Languages: Albayanon, Filipino
- Format: Contemporary MOR, News, Talk

Ownership
- Owner: iTransmission, Inc.
- Operator: Mid-tone Broadcasting Network

History
- First air date: 1988 (as DWDA); June 2017 (as Radyo Oragon)
- Former call signs: DWDA (1988–1995); DWML (October 2012-June 2017)
- Former frequencies: 91.5 MHz (October 2012-August 2015); 102.7 MHz (September 2015-June 2017)

Technical information
- Licensing authority: NTC
- Class: CDE
- Power: 2,000 watts
- Repeater: Virac: DZIT 88.7 MHz

DWII (90.7 FM), broadcasting as 90.7 Radyo Oragon, is a radio station owned by iTransmission and operated by Mid-tone Broadcasting Network. Its studios are located at Yashano Bldg., Imperial St., Brgy. Bitano, Legazpi, Albay, and its transmitter is located at Bariw Hill, Brgy. Estanza, Legazpi, Albay.

The frequency was formerly owned by Ago Medical and Educational Center's Institute of Mass Communication from 1988 to 1995.
