= Now Radio =

Now Radio may refer to:

- Now! Radio, the branding for several Canadian hot adult contemporary radio stations owned by the Jim Pattison Group:
  - CHNW-FM in Winnipeg, Manitoba, from 2021 to 2024
  - CKNO-FM in Edmonton, Alberta
  - CKPK-FM in Vancouver, British Columbia, from 2022 to 2024
- DWAD 1098 AM Now Radio, a radio station in Mandaluyong, Philippines
