= DZPA =

DZPA may refer to:

- DZPA-AM, an AM radio station broadcasting in Bangued
- DZPA-FM, an FM radio station broadcasting in Puerto Princesa, branded as Radyo Bandera
