= DYER =

Puerto Princesa; Philippines
- Broadcast area: Palawan
- Frequency: 828 kHz

Programming
- Format: Silent

Ownership
- Owner: DCG Radio-TV Network; (Katigbak Enterprises, Inc.)

History
- First air date: 1978
- Former call signs: DYEH (1978–2002)
- Former frequencies: 729 kHz (1978–2002)
- Call sign meaning: Environment Radio

Technical information
- Licensing authority: NTC

DYER (828 AM) was a radio station owned and operated by DCG Radio-TV Network. It was formerly known as Environment Radio under the management of then-mayor Edward Hagedorn until 2008, when it transferred to 1062 AM. Since then, the frequency has been off the air.
