= 648 AM =

AM radio frequency

The following radio stations broadcast on AM frequency 648 kHz:

== China ==
- CNR The Voice of China in Binzhou and Jinan

== Philippines ==
- DWRM in Puerto Princesa
- DYRC in Cebu City
- DXMB-AM in Malaybalay

== United Kingdom ==
- Radio Caroline from the Orfordness transmitting station
  - formerly broadcast BBC World Service to Western Europe until 27 March 2011.
