= DWAW =

DWAW may refer to:

- DWAW-AM, a defunct AM radio station broadcasting in Batangas
- DWAW-FM, an FM radio station broadcasting in Sorsogon City, branded as 99.9 Wow Smile Radio
- DWAW-TV, a defunct TV station broadcasting in Sorsogon City
