= Radyo Bandera Surallah =

Philippine radio station

- Surallah; Philippines
- Broadcast area: Northern South Cotabato, parts of Sultan Kudarat
- Frequency: 98.1 MHz
- Branding: 98.1 Radyo Bandera

Programming
- Languages: Hiligaynon, Filipino
- Format: Contemporary MOR, News, Talk
- Network: Radyo Bandera

Ownership
- Owner: Bandera News Philippines; (Palawan Broadcasting Corporation)

History
- First air date: 2010 (as Muews Radio); 2018 (as Radyo Bandera)
- Former frequencies: 96.1 MHz

Technical information
- Licensing authority: NTC
- Power: 5,000 watts
- ERP: 10,000 watts

98.1 Radyo Bandera (98.1 FM) is a radio station owned and operated by Bandera News Philippines. Its studios and transmitter are located at Brgy. Dajay, Surallah.

It was formerly owned by Kaissar Broadcasting Network and operated by Sagay Broadcasting Corporation under the Muews Radio network from 2010 to 2018.
