= DYUM =

Philippine radio station

JU FM (DYUM)
- Mabinay; Philippines
- Broadcast area: Central Negros Oriental and surrounding areas
- Frequency: 89.7 MHz
- Branding: 89.7 JU FM

Programming
- Languages: Cebuano, Filipino
- Format: Contemporary MOR, News, Talk
- Affiliations: K5 News FM

Ownership
- Owner: Palawan Broadcasting Corporation
- Operator: Municipal Government of Mabinay

History
- First air date: June 18, 2017

Technical information
- Licensing authority: NTC
- Power: 1,000 watts
- ERP: 2,100 watts

Links
- Website: Facebook page

DYUM (89.7 FM), broadcasting as 89.7 JU FM, is a radio station owned by Palawan Broadcasting Corporation and operated by the Municipal Government of Mabinay. The station's studio and transmitter are located at Brgy. Poblacion, Mabinay. As part of the local marketing agreement, it is an affiliate of K5 News FM for its news programming.

== Programming ==
JU FM's weekday line-up is composed of locally produced news, commentary and public affairs programming in the morning, lunchtime, afternoon and early-evening timeslots. Blocktimers, music and entertainment programs fill the remainder of the schedule. Simulcasts of programming from K5 News FM Dumaguete are also aired, primarily in the mid-morning and early-afternoon timeslots.

Saturdays feature a mix of news/talk and music programs throughout the broadcast day, most of which are presented by the station's on-air personalities. On Sundays, music and entertainment shows fill the majority of the schedule, including a few blocktime programs.
