= Radyo Bandera Central Luzon =

- Malolos; Philippines
- Broadcast area: Bulacan and surrounding areas
- Frequency: 90.3 MHz
- Branding: 90.3 Radyo Bandera

Programming
- Format: Contemporary MOR, News, Talk
- Affiliations: Radyo Bandera

Ownership
- Owner: Bandera News Philippines; (Palawan Broadcasting Corporation)

Technical information
- Class: C/D/E
- Power: 5,000 watts

90.3 Radyo Bandera (90.3 FM) is a radio station owned and operated by Bandera News Philippines through its licensee, Palawan Broadcasting Corporation. The station's studio is located along Lucero St., Purok 4, Brgy. Mabolo, Malolos.

== History ==
The provincial government of Bulacan established its own radio called "Radyo Bulacan" under the call letters DWRB on 90.3 FM. Radyo Bulacan broadcasts as a community radio station, airing news, music and local issues regarding the province.

Radyo Bulacan later on moved to 95.9 FM. Currently, the station broadcasts on 103.9 FM.

Around in the mid-2010s, the Colegio de San Jose - Malolos (owners of 88.7 DWAP-FM) acquired the frequency and launched it as JC FM with a community radio format.

In 2017, Palawan-based Bandera News Philippines acquired the station and relaunched it under the Radyo Bandera network.
