= DWDW =

Philippine radio station

- Puerto Princesa; Philippines
- Broadcast area: Palawan
- Frequency: 88.7 MHz

Programming
- Format: Silent (formerly news and music)

Ownership
- Owner: Prime Broadcasting Network

History
- First air date: 2015
- Last air date: May 15, 2022
- Former names: Radyo Bandera (2015-2022)

Technical information
- Licensing authority: NTC

DWDW (88.7 FM) was a radio station owned by Prime Broadcasting Network. It was under the management of Bandera News Philippines through an airtime lease agreement from its inception in 2015 until May 2022, when it transferred to 89.5 FM, owned by Palawan Broadcasting Corporation.
