= DWIZ =

DWIZ may refer to:

- DWIZ-AM, an AM radio station broadcasting in Metro Manila
- DWIZ-FM, an FM radio station broadcasting in Dagupan, branded as Home Radio
