= DWEC =

DWEC may refer to the Philippine radio stations:

- DWEC-AM, an AM radio station broadcasting in Puerto Princesa, branded as Environment Radio
- DWEC-FM, a defunct FM radio station broadcasting in Dagupan, branded as My Only Radio
