= DWKP =

Defunct Radio station in Legazpi, Philippines

Zagitsit News FM (DWKP)
- Legazpi; Philippines
- Broadcast area: Albay and surrounding areas
- Frequency: 101.9 MHz
- Branding: CAL 101.9 Zagitsit News FM

Programming
- Languages: Albayanon, Filipino, English
- Format: Contemporary MOR, News, Talk

Ownership
- Owner: DCG Radio-TV Network

History
- First air date: October 30, 2015 (on 100.3); August 13, 2022 (on 101.9)
- Former call signs: DWHI (October 30, 2015 – November 8, 2021)
- Former frequencies: 100.3 MHz (October 30, 2015 – November 8, 2021)

Technical information
- Licensing authority: NTC
- Power: 5,000 watts

DWKP (101.9 FM), broadcasting as CAL 101.9 Zagitsit News FM, is a radio station owned and operated by DCG Radio-TV Network. Its studios are located at Unit 3, Camelo Bldg., Imelda C. Roces Ave., Bgy. Gogon, Legazpi, Albay, and its transmitter is located at Bariw Hill, Brgy. Estanza, Legazpi, Albay.

== History ==
The station was established on October 30, 2015, on Hypersonic Broadcasting Center-owned 100.3 FM as Z100.3 Zagitsit News FM.

On November 8, 2021, as a result of the Cease and Desist Order issued by the National Telecommunications Commission, Zagitsit News FM went off the air due to violation of some policies for provisional authority in broadcasting. However, the management dismissed the claims, stating that political issues are involved in the station's closure. On December 9, 2021, it resurfaced as an online platform under the name Zagitsit News Online.

On August 13, 2022, Zagitsit News FM returned to terrestrial radio via Katigbak Enterprises-owned 101.9 FM.

In the morning of April 10, 2023, as a result of the Cease and Desist Order issued by the National Telecommunications Commission, Zagitsit News FM went off the air for the second time due to lack of legal papers in operating the station. However, the management dismissed the claims for the same reason since its Chief Operating Officer, Jun Alegre, ran for Provincial Board Member of Albay under the ticket of disqualified Governor Noel Rosal in the 2022 elections. Not long after, Joe Portugal became station manager while Jun Alegre became general manager. On April 17, 2023, it resurfaced again as an online platform.

On February 2, 2026, the station returned on air as CAL 101.9 Zagitsit News FM. It is currently on test broadcast.
