= DWNG =

Gospel Radio (DWNG)
- Tiaong; Philippines
- Broadcast area: Quezon and surrounding areas
- Frequency: 97.5 MHz
- Branding: 97.5 Gospel Radio

Programming
- Language: Filipino
- Format: Religious Radio

Ownership
- Owner: Southern Tagalog Sweet Life
- Operator: North Philippine Union Conference

History
- First air date: January 5, 1997
- Former names: Big Sound FM (January 5, 1997-September 14, 2014); Radio City (September 22, 2014-2021)

Technical information
- Licensing authority: NTC
- Power: 10 kW

97.5 Gospel Radio (DWNG 97.5 MHz) is an FM station owned by Southern Tagalog Sweet Life and operated by North Philippine Union Conference of the Seventh-day Adventists. Its studios and transmitter are located at Brgy. Cabatang, Tiaong.

== History ==
The station was established on January 5, 1997 as Big Sound FM under the ownership of Vanguard Radio Network. On September 14, 2014, Big Sound FM went off the air for the last time. A month prior, Southern Tagalog Sweet Life acquired the frequency.

On September 22, 2014, Radio City, which was formerly on 105.3 FM, was relaunched on this frequency. Since then, it was under DCG Radio-TV Network, which acquired the latter frequency last December 2013. Sometime in 2021, Radio City went off the air.

On January 2, 2023, the station returned on air, this time as Gospel Radio under the operations of North Philippine Union Conference of the Seventh-day Adventists. It was formerly on Filipinas Broadcasting Network-owned 96.7 FM prior to its move.
