= DWQJ =

Radio station in Naga, Camarines Sur, Philippines

Home Radio Naga (DWQJ)
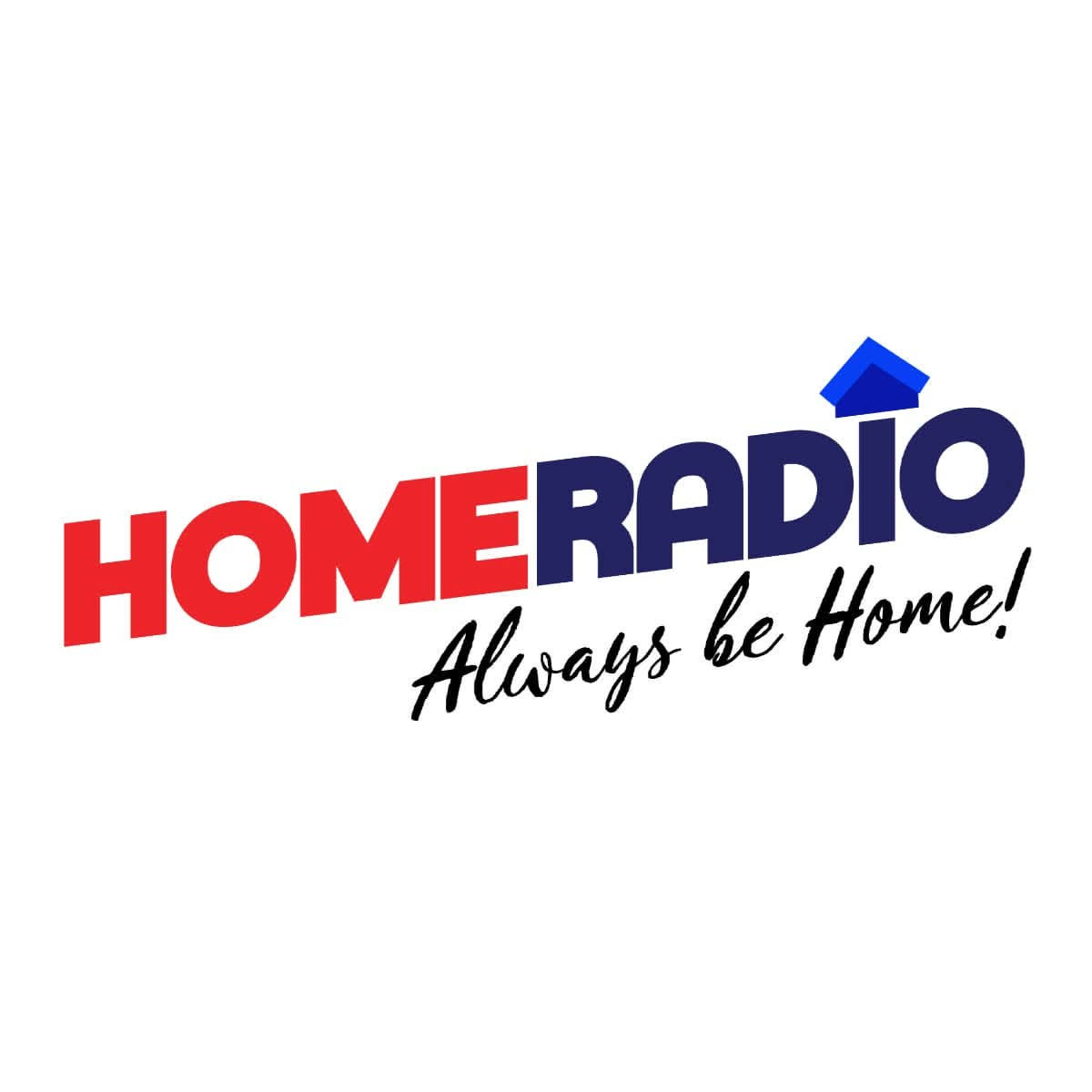
- Naga; Philippines
- Broadcast area: Camarines Sur and surrounding areas
- Frequency: 95.1 MHz
- Branding: 95.1 Home Radio

Programming
- Language: English
- Format: Soft adult contemporary
- Network: Home Radio

Ownership
- Owner: Aliw Broadcasting Corporation

History
- First air date: 2002
- Former names: DWIZ (2023–26)

Technical information
- Licensing authority: NTC
- Power: 5,000 watts
- ERP: 10,000 watts

DWQJ (95.1 FM), broadcasting as 95.1 Home Radio, is a radio station owned and operated by Aliw Broadcasting Corporation. Its studios and transmitter are located at Eternal Gardens Compound, Basilica Rd., Brgy. Balatas, Naga, Camarines Sur.

== History ==
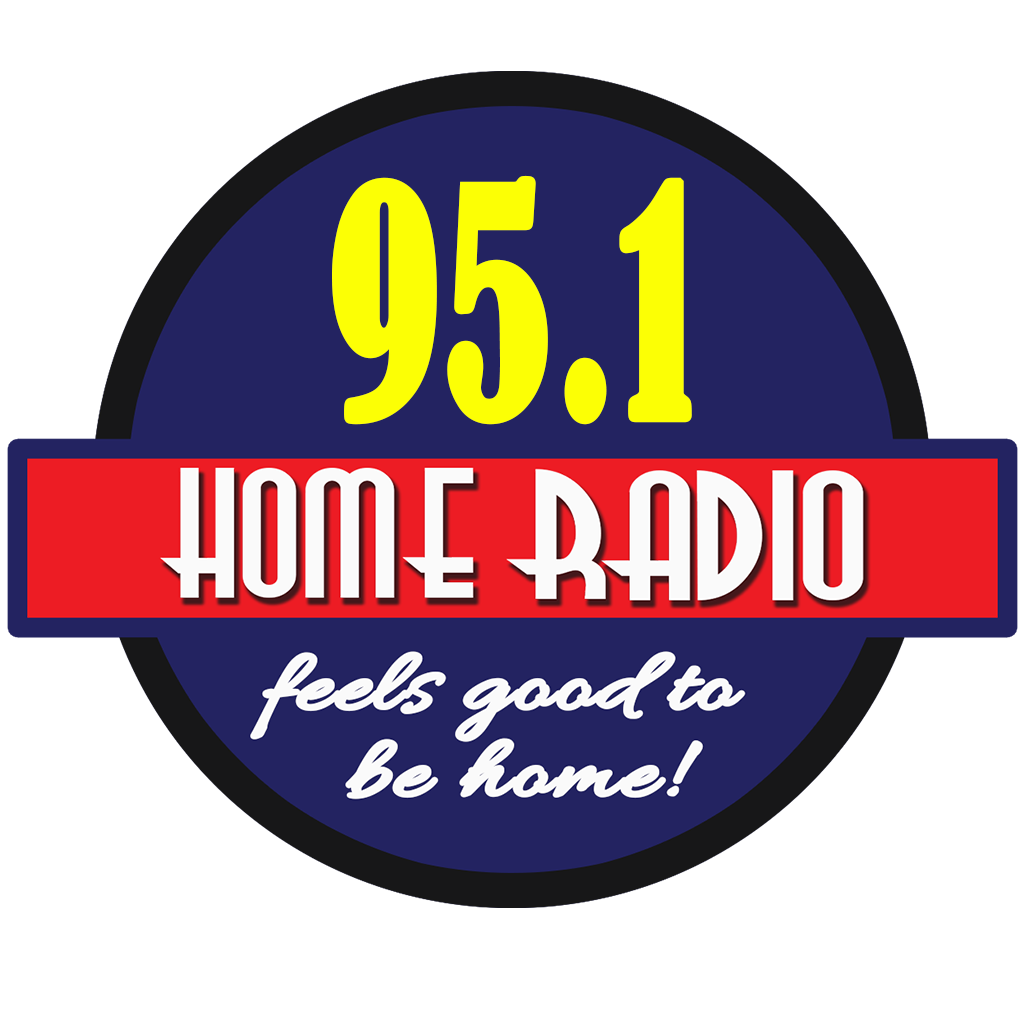
Home Radio Naga logo from July 2017 to January 2023.

The station was formerly under the Home Radio network from its inception in 2002 to January 16, 2023. On January 30, 2023, it was relaunched under the DWIZ network. On April 30, 2026, DWIZ News FM made its final broadcast. On May 8, after a week of music automation, it was relaunched under the Home Radio network.

== Notable on-air personalities ==
- Leni Robredo
