= DWQZ =

Radio station in Metro Manila, Philippines

Home Radio Manila (DWQZ)
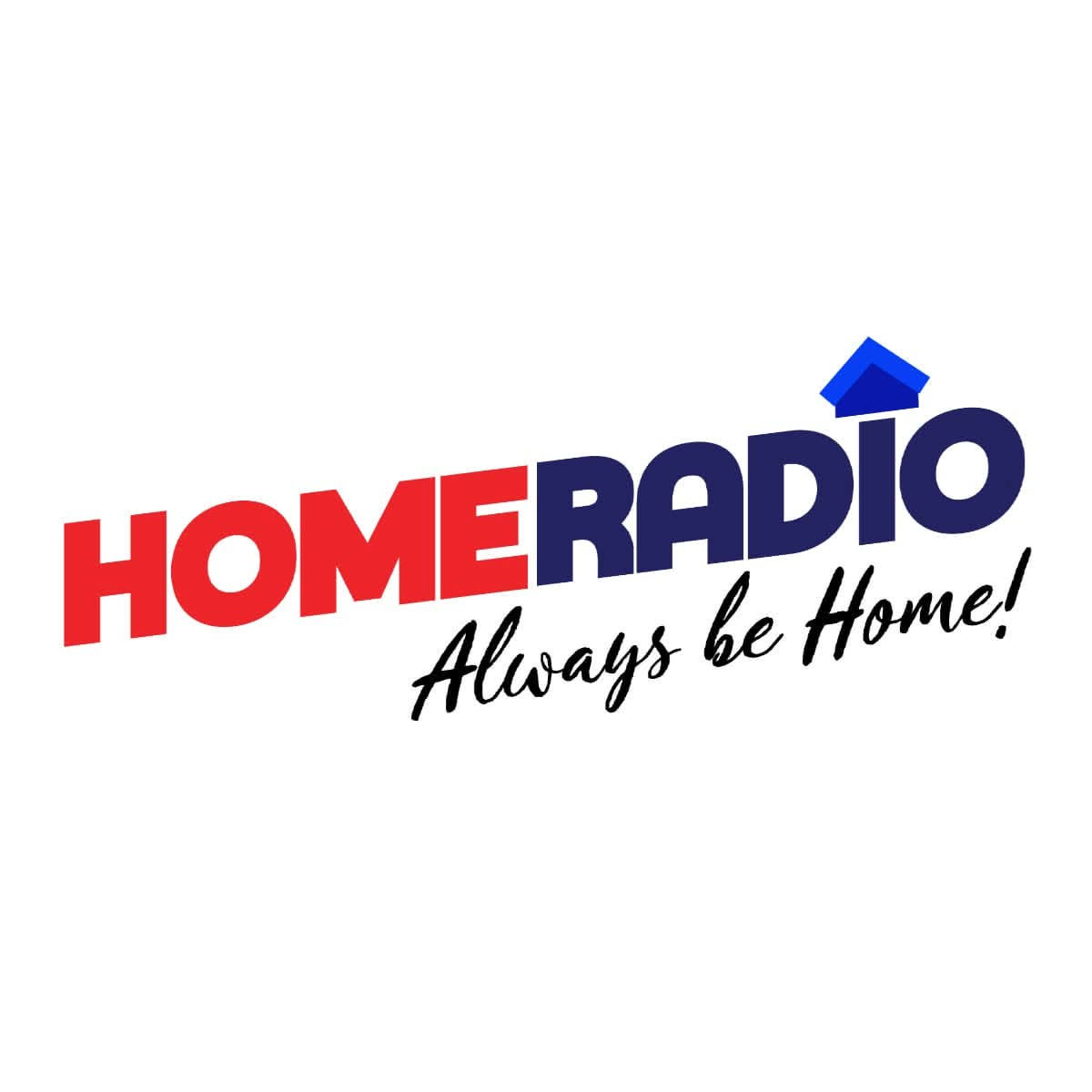
- Pasig; Philippines
- Broadcast area: Mega Manila and surrounding areas
- Frequency: 97.9 MHz
- RDS: 1. HOME; 2. RADIO
- Branding: 97.9 Home Radio

Programming
- Language: English
- Format: Soft adult contemporary
- Network: Home Radio

Ownership
- Owner: Aliw Broadcasting Corporation; (Insular Broadcasting System)
- Sister stations: DWIZ-AM; DWBA-DTV (Aliw Channel 23)

History
- First air date: September 28, 1994
- Former call signs: DWCD-FM (1982–1997)
- Call sign meaning: Variant of sister station DWIZ

Technical information
- Licensing authority: NTC
- Class: A/B/C
- Power: 25,000 watts
- ERP: 75,000 watts

Links
- Website: www.979homeradio.com

DWQZ (97.9 FM), broadcasting as 97.9 Home Radio, is a radio station owned and operated by Aliw Broadcasting Corporation through its licensee Insular Broadcasting System. Its studio is located at the 20th floor, Citystate Centre, 709 Shaw Boulevard, Brgy. Oranbo, Pasig, and its transmitter is located at Nuestra Señora Dela Paz Subdivision, Sumulong Highway, Brgy. Santa Cruz, Antipolo (sharing facilities with sister station ALIW 23).

== History ==
=== 1994–2014: First easy listening era ===
Home Radio began test broadcasts on September 28, 1994 as Q97. It established itself as the "#1 Easy Listening Station" in Metro Manila with a soft adult contemporary format. Following its early success— gaining a strong listener base within just six months— the format was gradually adopted across its provincial stations. While the station primarily featured easy listening music from Mondays to Saturdays, it featured a variety hits format on Sundays through its Home Radio VHS block, offering listeners a broader musical selection to end the week.

In 2006, Home Radio introduced its first 24-hour fully automated DJ, known as DJ Jackie, voiced by Lannie Chan, who was also known for her work as one of the female voice talents for RPN. This innovation marked a shift in the station’s programming strategy. By 2009, Home Radio began recruiting female DJs, and later male DJs, embracing a "less talk, more music" approach to enhance the listening experience.

On February 28, 2014, the Home Radio network dropped its original format.

=== 2014–2015: Masa era ===
On March 17, 2014, following a two-week transition period, the Home Radio network was relaunched with a mass-based format and adapted the slogan "Natural!". Under the management of Bryan "Idol T-Bone" Quitoriano, the station retained its existing air team, albeit carrying fruit-inspired on-air monikers. Adding to the lineup, well-known OPM artists Jimmy Bondoc and Duncan Ramos, celebrated for their work with the Sabado Boys, hosted a special program titled "The R&B (Ramos & Bondoc) Show" from July through December of that year. By November 2014, the network reverted to its original Home Radio branding

=== 2015–2017: Top 40 era ===
On April 5, 2015, the station began a gradual shift toward a Top 40 format with a strong emphasis on Original Pilipino Music (OPM), dubbed as CHR Local, and adapted the slogan "Be You". By this time, Migz Anzures (formerly of RT) took over as station manager.

By the end of 2015, Home Radio fully transitioned into a Top 40 station, with Braggy Braganza stepping in as the new station manager. The station adapted a more contemporary slogan "The Music of Now", complemented by the catchphrase "The Home of the Millennials".

That year also saw the launch of the innovative Aircheck 979, a student DJ search program that scouted and showcased talented student DJs from various schools and universities across the country.

=== 2017–present: Second easy listening era ===
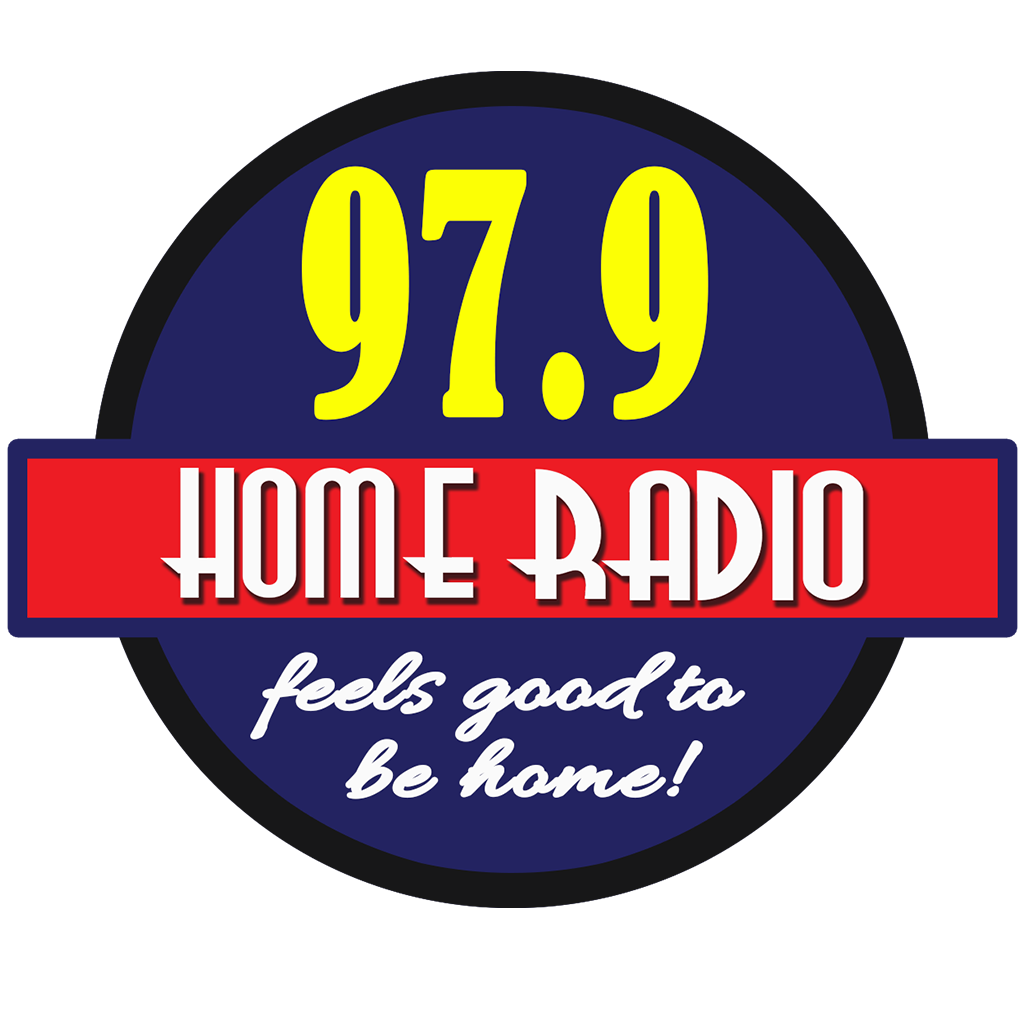
97.9 Home Radio logo from 2017 until 2026

On June 30, 2017, at 9:00 AM PHT, Home Radio abruptly discontinued its current programming and reverted back to its original Soft Adult Contemporary format. This rebranding came with a refreshed slogan, "It Feels Good to be Home", and featured a newly recorded jingle performed by Chi Bocobo, formerly known as Ces Datu. Station manager Braggy Braganza later explained that this abrupt reformat aimed to broaden the station’s audience reach and boost sales performance.

In January 2023, all Home Radio provincial stations were relaunched under the DWIZ branding, leaving this station as the remaining Home Radio outlet.

On May 1, 2026, the Home Radio branding was temporarily dropped as part of the transition under new management. Its live DJs had their final broadcast a day prior. On May 8, the branding was restored with the slogan "Always Be Home". At the same day, its provincial stations were relaunched under the Home Radio branding and original format.
