= DWLD =

Radio station in Batangas, Philippines

DCG FM (DWLD)
- Batangas City; Philippines
- Broadcast area: Batangas and surrounding areas
- Frequency: 88.7 MHz
- Branding: 88.7 DCG FM

Programming
- Language: Filipino
- Format: OPM

Ownership
- Owner: DCG Radio-TV Network; (Katigbak Enterprises, Inc.)
- Sister stations: 107.9 QFM

History
- First air date: October 2010
- Former call signs: DZUN (October 2010-September 2020)
- Former names: Majic 88.7 (October 2010-September 2020)

Technical information
- Licensing authority: NTC
- Class: BCDE
- Power: 10,000 watts
- Transmitter coordinates: 13°42′28″N 121°10′21″E

DWLD (88.7 FM), broadcasting as 88.7 DCG FM, is a radio station owned and operated by DCG Radio-TV Network. The station's studio is located in Batangas City, and its transmitter is located at Mt. Banoy, Talumpok Silangan, Batangas City.

== History ==
The station was established in October 2010 as Majic 88.7. At that time, it was operated by BPS Broadcasting Media Services, with studios located at the 3rd Floor, Zen's Building, Ayala Highway, Brgy. Balintawak, Lipa, Batangas. In September 2020, DCG took over the station's operations. It rebranded as 88.7 DCG FM and switched to an all-OPM format.
