= DXQS =

Radio station in General Santos, Philippines

Home Radio General Santos (DXQS)
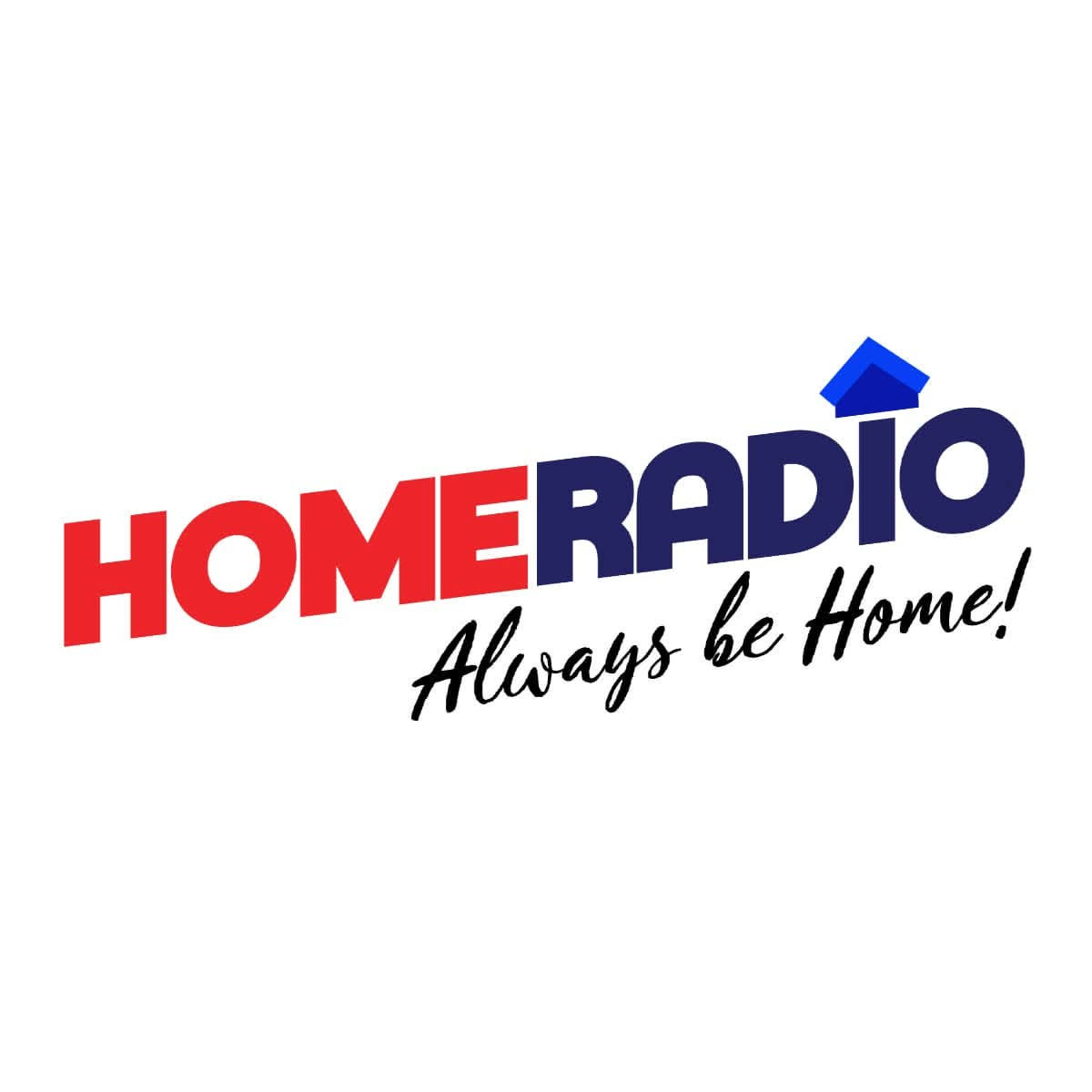
- General Santos; Philippines
- Broadcast area: South Cotabato, Sarangani and surrounding areas
- Frequency: 98.3 MHz
- Branding: 98.3 Home Radio

Programming
- Language: English
- Format: Soft adult contemporary
- Network: Home Radio

Ownership
- Owner: Aliw Broadcasting Corporation

History
- First air date: 2000
- Former names: DWIZ (2023–26)

Technical information
- Licensing authority: NTC
- Power: 10,000 watts
- ERP: 25,000 watts

Links
- Website: 983 Home Radio Official Website

DXQS (98.3 FM), broadcasting as 98.3 Home Radio, is a radio station owned and operated by Aliw Broadcasting Corporation. The station's studio and transmitter are located at Unit 2026, Second Floor, Colossian Bldg., C.M Recto cor. Daproza Ave., General Santos.

== History ==
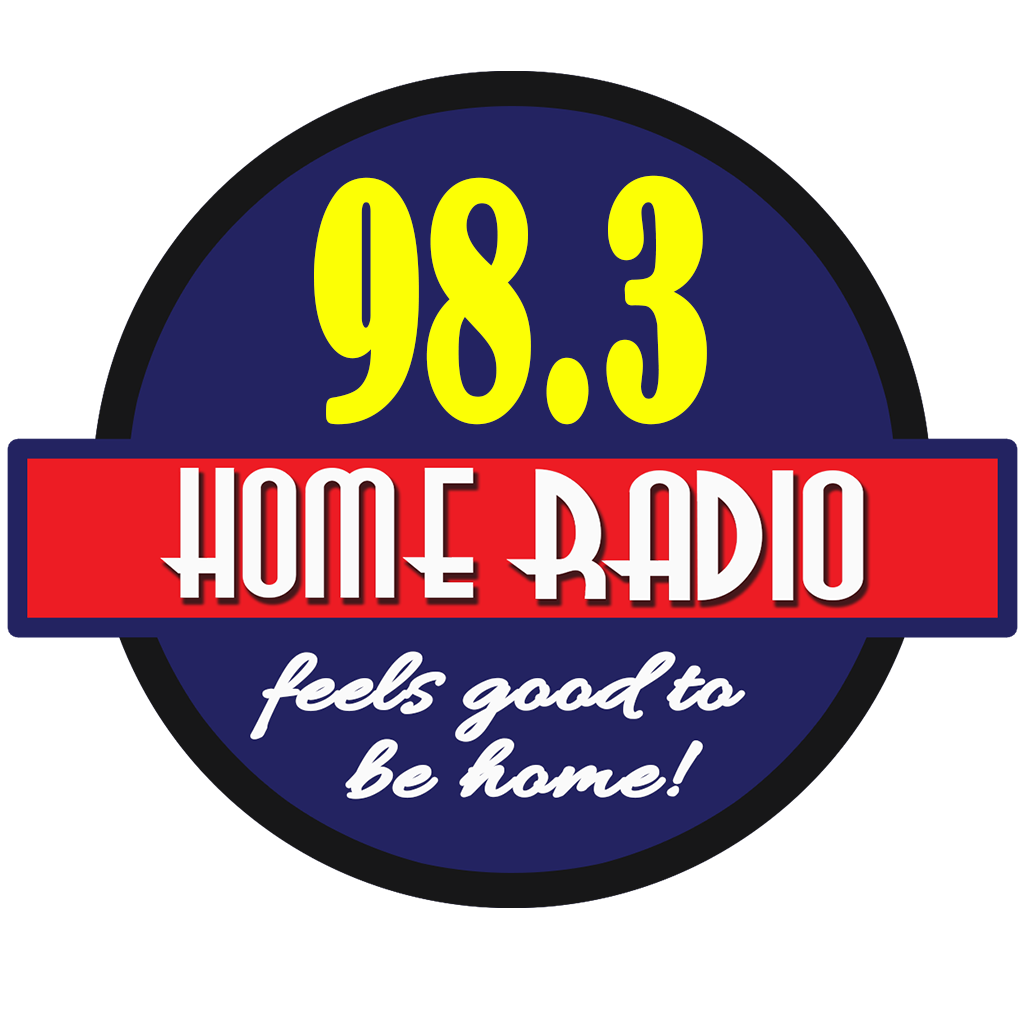
Home Radio GenSan logo from July 2017 to January 2023.

The station was formerly under the Home Radio network from its inception in 2000 to January 16, 2023. It was initially located in Sleepbest Hotel along Pioneer Ave. until 2016, when it transferred to Atasha Hotel & Dormitory in Dadiangas East. On January 30, 2023, it was relaunched under the DWIZ network. It transferred to its present home at Colossian Bldg. On April 30, 2026, DWIZ News FM made its final broadcast. On May 8, after a week of music automation, it was relaunched under the Home Radio network.
