= DXFJ =

Radyo Bandera Tandag (DXFJ)
- Tandag; Philippines
- Broadcast area: Northern Surigao del Sur, parts of Agusan del Sur
- Frequency: 100.7 MHz
- Branding: 100.7 Radyo Bandera

Programming
- Languages: Surigaonon, Filipino
- Format: Contemporary MOR, News, Talk
- Network: Radyo Bandera

Ownership
- Owner: Bandera News Philippines; (Palawan Broadcasting Corporation)

History
- First air date: 2018

Technical information
- Licensing authority: NTC
- Power: 5,000 watts
- ERP: 10,000 watts

DXFJ (100.7 FM), on-air as 100.7 Radyo Bandera, is a radio station owned and operated by Bandera News Philippines. Its studios and transmitter are located at the 2nd Floor, Dr. Santos Yu Bldg., Donasco St., Brgy. Bag-ong Lungsod, Tandag.
