= Wolfgang Pfeifer (etymologist) =

German etymologist (1922–2020)

Wolfgang Pfeifer (3 December 1922 in Leipzig – 9 July 2020 in Berlin) was a German scholar and linguist.

== Life ==
Wolfgang Pfeifer studied German, Scandinavian studies, English, historical linguistics and history. After completing his doctorate at the University of Leipzig in 1950, he worked as a researcher at the German Academy of Sciences at Berlin, where he worked on the German Dictionary of the Grimm Brothers from 1949 to 1960. In 1961, together with other collaborators, he received the I. Class National Prize of the GDR for the completion of the German Dictionary.

Pfeifer published numerous contributions to linguistics, linguistic and word history and lexicography. Of particular scientific importance is the Etymological Dictionary of German, which was compiled under his direction by a collective of eight to ten authors at the Berlin Academy. The first edition was published in May 1989 and has been updated ever since, most recently online as a component in the Digital Dictionary of the German Language.

Wolfgang Pfeifer, father of two daughters by his first marriage and widowed, was married in the 1980s to Gerlinde Pfeifer, who was also a member of the authors' collective of the Etymological Dictionary. He lived in Berlin.

Hans Magnus Enzensberger considered him the most important German etymologist after the Grimm Brothers, Hermann Paul and Friedrich Kluge.

== Important publications ==
=== Dictionaries ===
- Wörterbuch der deutschen Tiernamen. Insekten. Lfg. 1–6. Akademie-Verlag, Berlin 1963–1968.
- Wörterbuch der deutschen Tiernamen. Beiheft 1: Käfer. Akademie-Verlag, Berlin 1963.
- Wörterbuch der deutschen Tiernamen: Beiheft 2: Schabe. Akademie-Verlag, Berlin 1965.
- Wörterbuch der deutschen Tiernamen. Beiheft 4: Spanische Fliegen und Maiwürmer: Akademie-Verlag, Berlin 1966.
- Etymologisches Wörterbuch des Deutschen (publisher)
  - 3 volumes: Akademie Verlag, Berlin. 1st edition 1989, 2nd edition 1993.
  - one volume: dtv, 1665 pages. 1st edition 1995, 2nd edition 1997, 6th edition, München 2003 (= dtv. Band 32511).
  - one volume: Akzente Verlagshaus, 2010, 1665 pages, ISBN 978-3-941960-03-9.
  - Digital: Part of DWDS, based on the 2nd edition of the three-volume version of 1993.
- with Heinrich Marzell and Wilhelm Wissmann: Wörterbuch der deutschen Pflanzennamen. 1943–1979.

=== Contributions ===
- Das Deutsche Wörterbuch. In: Deutsches Jahrbuch für Volkskunde 9 (1963), S. 190–213 (= Jacob Grimm zur 100. Wiederkehr seines Todestages. Festschrift des Instituts für deutsche Volkskunde).
- Geschichtliches und Kritisches zur Lexikographie an der Akademie. In: Erbe, Vermächtnis und Verpflichtung. Zur sprachwissenschaftlichen Forschung in der Geschichte der AdW der DDR (=Sprache und Gesellschaft 10). Akademie-Verlag, Berlin 1978, S. 119–131.
- Mittellateinisches Wörterbuch und deutsche Etymologie. In: Philologus 123 (1979), S. 170–173.
- Adelungs Stellung zur Etymologie in seinem Wörterbuch. In: Werner Bahner (Hrsg.): Sprache und Kulturentwicklung im Blickfeld der deutschen Spätaufklärung. Der Beitrag Johann Christoph Adelungs. (= Abhandlungen der Sächsischen Akademie der Wissenschaften. Philologisch-historische Klasse, Jg. 70, Nr. 4). Akademie-Verlag, Berlin 1984, S. 233–238.
- Bericht über das Etymologische Wörterbuch des Deutschen. In: Current Trends in West Germanic Etymological Lexicography 1993, S. 77–89.
