= DZPA-FM =

Radio station in the Philippines

Radyo Bandera Palawan (DZPA)
- Puerto Princesa; Philippines
- Broadcast area: Palawan
- Frequency: 89.5 MHz
- Branding: 89.5 Radyo Bandera

Programming
- Language: Filipino
- Format: Contemporary MOR, News, Talk
- Network: Radyo Bandera

Ownership
- Owner: Bandera News Philippines; (Palawan Broadcasting Corporation)

History
- First air date: November 25, 2014
- Former call signs: DWDW (November 25, 2014-May 15, 2022)
- Former frequencies: 88.7 MHz (November 25, 2014-May 15, 2022)
- Call sign meaning: Palawan

Technical information
- Licensing authority: NTC
- Power: 10,000 watts

DZPA (89.5 FM), broadcasting as 89.5 Radyo Bandera, is a radio station owned and operated by Bandera News Philippines. It serves as the flagship station of the Radyo Bandera network. The station's studio is located in Macasaet Business Complex, Roxas St., Puerto Princesa. The station spans its broadcast throughout Palawan.

== History ==
Radyo Bandera was launched on November 25, 2014 on 88.7 FM owned by Prime Broadcasting Network. It became the nucleus of what would become Bandera News Philippines, which was launched on June 1, 2015. On May 16, 2022, it transferred to its current frequency.
