= DZIP =

Radio station in Puerto Princesa, Philippines

Radyo Palaweño (DZIP)
Puerto Princesa; Philippines
- Broadcast area: Palawan
- Frequency: 864 kHz
- Branding: DZIP Radyo Palaweño

Programming
- Language: Filipino
- Format: News, Public Affairs, Talk, Community Radio

Ownership
- Owner: iTransmission, Inc.

History
- First air date: December 12, 2011
- Call sign meaning: iTransmission Palawan

Technical information
- Licensing authority: NTC
- Power: 10,000 watts

DZIP (864 AM) Radyo Palaweño is a radio station owned and operated by iTransmission, Inc. The station's studio and transmitter are located at the 2nd Floor, Dimalanta Bldg., 84 Rizal Ave., Brgy. Magkakaibigan, Puerto Princesa.

The station is staffed by broadcasters of the defunct DYPR, Palawan's pioneer station which was acquired by ABS-CBN from Palawan Broadcasting Corporation & relaunched as Radyo Patrol in October 2011.
