= DWAD =

Radio station in Metro Manila, Philippines

Now Radio (DWAD)
- Mandaluyong; Philippines
- Broadcast area: Metro Manila and surrounding areas
- Frequency: 1098 kHz
- Branding: DWAD 1098 Now Radio

Programming
- Languages: Filipino, English
- Format: Blocktime (Religious, Talk)

Ownership
- Owner: Crusaders Broadcasting System

History
- First air date: July 22, 1973
- Former frequencies: 1080 kHz (1973–1978)

Technical information
- Licensing authority: NTC
- Power: 10,000 watts

Links
- Website: DWAD on Facebook; DWAD Official Website

DWAD (1098 AM) Now Radio is a radio station owned and operated by Crusaders Broadcasting System, a media outlet owned by Cesar A. Dumlao, a government official during the martial law era under Ferdinand Marcos. Its studios are located at the Ground Floor, Dumlao Sports Center, 304 Shaw Blvd., Mandaluyong, while its transmitter located at 209 E. Dela Paz St., Mandaluyong.

== History ==
DWAD was a music station during the Martial Law era. Among its notable personalities were Lito Gorospe, Rino Basilio, Rene Jose, Mely Factoran and Manolo Favis. Currently, the station broadcasts brokered programming, consisting of mostly religious programs (Christian and Islamic), with music fillers playing Classic Hits. On December 1, 2018, the station adopted the Now Radio brand.

== See also ==
- DWCD-FM
