= Cathedral of Praise =

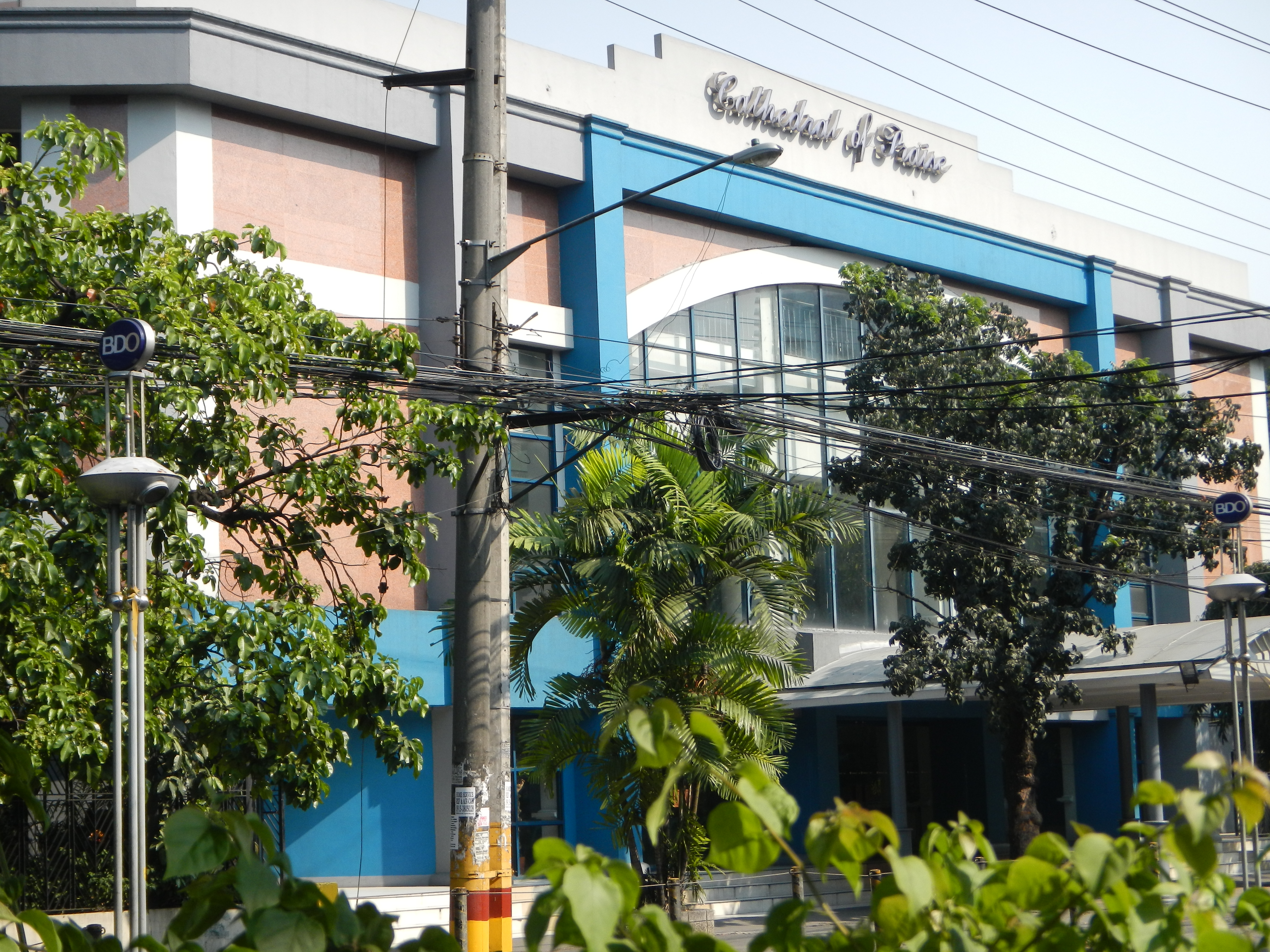
- COP Main Campus as seen from across the street on Taft Avenue in Ermita, Manila
- Cathedral of Praise
- 14°34′53″N 120°59′09″E
- Location: Ermita, Manila
- Country: Philippines
- Denomination: Protestant
- Churchmanship: Pentecostal
- Website: cathedralofpraisemanila.com.ph

History
- Former name: Manila Bethel Temple
- Status: Church
- Founded: July 1954 (72 years ago)
- Founder: Dr. Lester Sumrall

Architecture
- Style: Contemporary modern

The Cathedral of Praise (COP) is a Full Gospel, Christ-centered megachurch based in Manila, Philippines. COP is headed by Pastors David and Beverley Sumrall.

Founded in 1954, formerly Manila Bethel Temple, The Cathedral of Praise is a Christian church founded in 1954 by Ptr. Lester Sumrall. COP operates a Main Campus along Taft Avenue, Manila, an East Campus in Pioneer Centre, Pasig, a South Campus at Versailles, Las Piñas and a North Campus along Commonwealth Ave., Quezon City.

== History ==
The Cathedral of Praise, formerly Manila Bethel Temple, was founded in 1954 by Dr. Lester Sumrall. Under the leadership of Dr. David Sumrall and his wife Bev, who moved to Manila in 1989, the Church had grown to a membership of 15,000, with a large staff including 90 full-time, paid, evangelists engaged in attracting others in the predominantly Roman Catholic Philippines to evangelical Christianity.

Cathedral of Praise is currently expanding. In their website, they mentioned their plan to plant 200 churches in 20 years.

After nearly three decades of building and finishing the construction costs of the 8,000-seat auditorium, the COP complex and congregational facilities continue to expand not only in the main campus but also in key areas of the metro. Aside from the Manila Campus, the COP East Campus over at the Pioneer Centre in Mandaluyong, South Campus located at the Versailles Place in Las Piñas, and the newly built North Campus in Commonwealth, Quezon City, serve members residing in those areas. In the works are the plans to build for the South Campus its own facilities and over-all maintenance and specific upgrades of portions of the Main Campus are also underway.

Cathedral of Praise have aired in different TV Networks. Cathedral of Praise with David Sumrall started its airing at ABS-CBN Channel 2 from the year 1986 to 1992. Then it was later moved to the reopened ABC Channel 5 (now TV5) from 1992 to 1995 GMA Channel 7 year 1995 and ended its airing in the year 2002. Followed by its airing at RPN Channel 9 from the same year until 2005 and on DZRH TV from 2022 to present.

On January 29, 2017, Cathedral of Praise formally launched its own radio station, COP, DZBR 531 kHz on the AM band, from Tanauan, Batangas. DZBR broadcasts gospel-related programs from 5:00 AM to 12:00 MN. daily on traditional AM radio and 24/7 via internet streaming. The station can be heard in the whole Batangas, and some parts of Calabarzon and Metro Manila. On February 23, DZBR started its test broadcast.

== Campuses ==
Cathedral of Praise is a multisite church and currently has ten main worship services located throughout the Mega Manila but will expand around 20 campuses by the end of 2025 or first half of 2026.

=== Main Campus ===
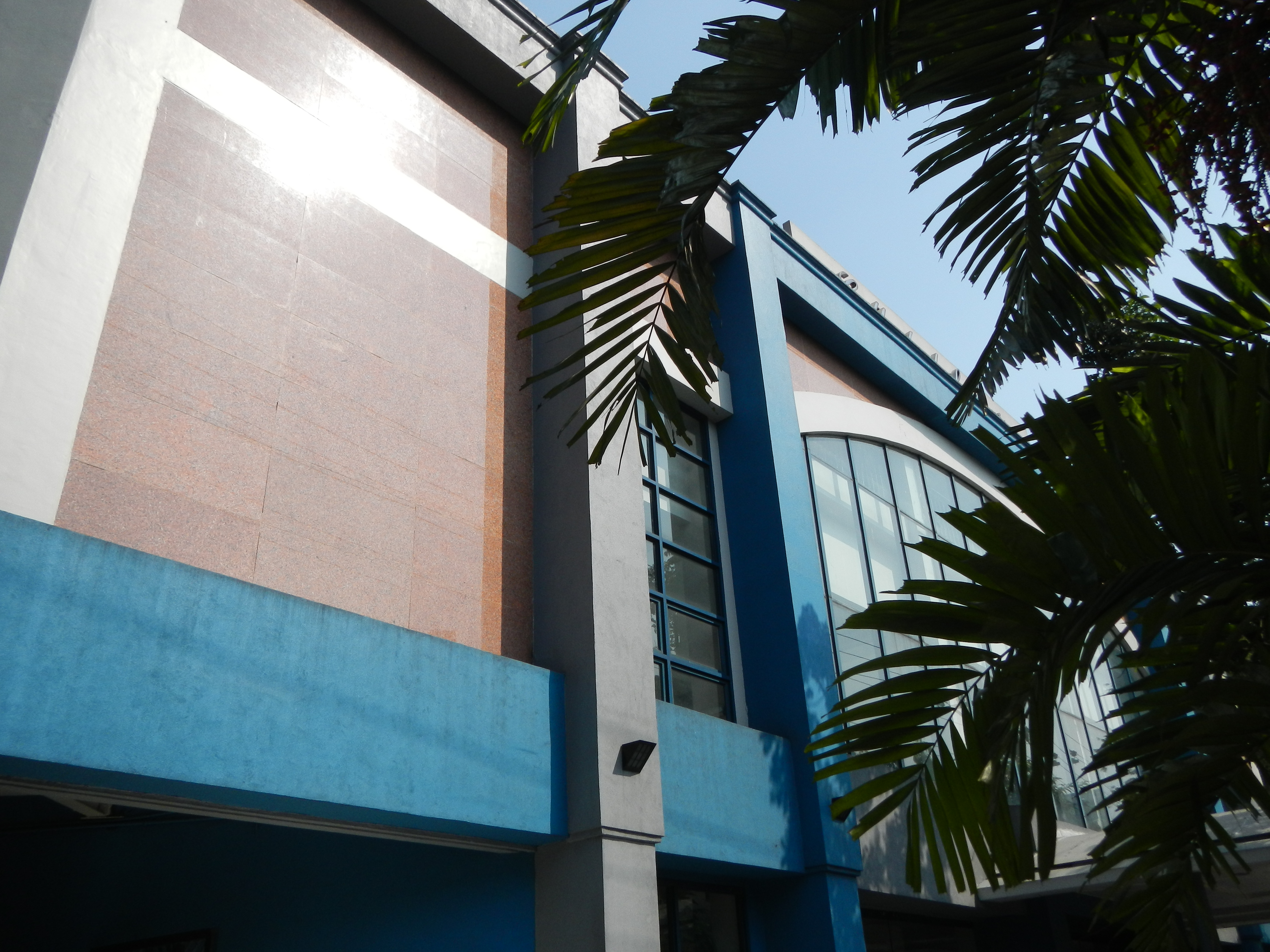
A view of the facade of the COP Main Campus.

The Main Campus of COP is located in Taft Avenue, Ermita, Manila. It serves as the headquarters of the church. It contains the Kid's Tower, Serenity Columbarium, the Bible/Music College, Connect Central, a cry room, a medical clinic, a bookstore, an audio-visual room, the COP Cafe, several prayer rooms and church offices. The residing Campus Pastors for COP Main Campus are Pastora Rose Delos Reyes and Pastor Oyin Galvan.

=== East Campus ===
COP East Campus is located in Pioneer Center along Pioneer street in Pasig. It previously held its Sunday worship services in Shangri-La Mall until July 2014. The current residing Campus Pastor and Speaker is Pastora Melissa Mercano.

=== North Campus ===
COP North Campus is located in 2nd Floor of Shopking, Doña Carmen at the Commonwealth Ave, Quezon City, Metro Manila. The residing Campus Pastor and speaker for COP North Campus is Pastora Melisa Mercano.

=== South Campus ===
The COP South Campus is located along Versailles-Daang Hari Road in Las Piñas. It previously held its services on Bellevue Hotel in Alabang, Muntinlupa until 2007. In November 2010, it was announced that the South Campus will transfer to the Festival Mall, but the transfer was cancelled. They also announced another transfer on April 15, 2012, to the West Service Road in Muntinlupa. However, COP South Campus transferred at its present site on its own building. The current residing Campus Pastor is Pastora Tin Gatchalian and Pastora Alisha Sumrall-Lozano as Campus Speaker.

=== Bulacan Campus ===
The COP Bulacan Campus is located in 8002 MacArthur Highway, Barangay Ilang-ilang, Guiguinto, Bulacan. The residing Campus Pastor and speaker for COP Bulacan Campus is Pastor Bong Soriano and Pastora Juvy Soriano.

=== Pampanga Campus ===
The COP Pampanga Campus is located in MacArthur Highway, Barangay Baliti, City of San Fernando, Pampanga. The residing Campus Pastor and speaker for COP Pampanga Campus is Pastora Louise Reyes.

=== Cainta Campus ===
The COP Cainta Campus is located in 766 A. Bonifacio Ave., Barangay San Juan, Cainta, Rizal. The residing Campus Pastor and speaker for COP Cainta Campus is Pastor Isaac Ferrer.

=== Kawit Campus ===
The COP Kawit Campus is located in 463 EPZA Diversion Road, Putol, Kawit, Cavite. The residing Campus Pastor and speaker for COP Kawit Campus is Pastora Ruth Garcia.

=== Naic Campus ===
The COP Kawit Campus is located in Governor Drive, Barangay Malainen Bago, Naic, Cavite. The residing Campus Pastor and speaker for COP Naic Campus is Pastora Joan Cuaresma.

=== Santa Rosa Campus ===
The COP Santa Rosa Campus is located in 52 Santa Rosa-Tagaytay Road, Pulong, Santa Rosa, Laguna. The residing Campus Pastor and speaker for COP Santa Rosa Campus is Pastora Oyin Galvan.

=== Future campuses ===
- Angeles Campus (Angeles City)
- Antipolo Campus (Antipolo City, Rizal)
- Binangonan Campus (Binangonan, Rizal)
- Dasmariñas Campus (Dasmariñas City, Cavite)
- General Trias Campus (General Trias City, Cavite)
- Mexico Campus (Mexico, Pampanga)
- North Caloocan Campus (Caloocan City)
- Pandi Campus (Pandi, Bulacan)
- Rodriguez-San Mateo Campus (Rodriguez or San Mateo, Rizal)
- San Jose Del Monte Campus (San Jose del Monte, Bulacan)
- Tagaytay Campus (Tagaytay City, Cavite)

== Branches ==
Cathedral of Praise Branch Churches
Location	Pastor(s)	Established	Image
Luzon
Albay	Pastora Ia Enate		
Bataan	Pastor Reuel Ruperto and Pastora Lolit Ruperto		
Batangas	Pastora Cheska Angor		
Isabela	Pastora Tessa Paulo		
La Union	Pastora Pat Landayao		
Laoag	Pastora Eydrich Alameda		
Lipa	Pastora Ric-cie Ann Miguel		
Olongapo	Pastor Jeremy Martija		
Romblon	Pastora Helen Luzarita		
San Narciso	Pastora Rina Babao		
San Pablo	Pastora Rain Pagarigan		
Visayas
Cebu City	Pastora Gene Ubalde		
Mindanao
Davao City	Pastor Duke Alba		
Zamboanga City	Pastor Ezekiel Cadion		
The Americas (North, Central, and South America)
Calgary, Canada	Pastor Alder De Dios		
Vancouver, Canada	Pastor Alder De Dios		
Hawaii, USA	Pastora Josie Casten		
Asia Pacific (Asia, Oceania, and The Middle East)
Melbourne, Australia	Pastor Joey Pagadora		
Sydney, Australia	Pastor Joey Pagadora		
Singapore	Pastora Yam Salem		
Abu Dhabi, United Arab Emirates	Pastora Joy Baylon		
Dubai, United Arab Emirates	Pastor JohnMatt Catiltil (Matt)		

== See also ==
- DZBR 531 Bible Radio
