= DWSU =

Green FM
- Dasmariñas; Philippines
- Broadcast area: Dasmariñas
- Frequency: 95.9 MHz
- Branding: 95.9 Green FM

Programming
- Languages: English, Filipino
- Format: College radio

Ownership
- Owner: De La Salle University – Dasmariñas

History
- First air date: 2005

Technical information
- Licensing authority: NTC
- Power: 20 watts

Links
- Website: www.dlsud.edu.ph/greenfm.htm

95.9 Green FM (DWSU 95.9 MHz) is an FM station owned and operated by De La Salle University - Dasmariñas. Its studios and transmitter are located inside the DLSU-D Campus, West Ave., Dasmariñas.
