= DWAW-AM =

DWAW
Batangas City; Philippines
- Broadcast area: Southern Luzon and surrounding areas
- Frequency: 999 kHz

Programming
- Format: Silent

Ownership
- Owner: ConAmor Broadcasting Systems

History
- First air date: February 2008
- Last air date: July 2013

Technical information
- Licensing authority: NTC

DWAW (999 AM) was a radio station owned by ConAmor Broadcasting System. Its studios and transmitter were located at Brgy. Sampaga Centro, Batangas City.

== History ==
=== 2008-2011: Operations and inactivity ===
DWAW went on the air in February 2008 with regional staples syndicated by ConAmor Broadcasting System such as Bagong Bayo in the morning drive-time hours and music fillers in the afternoon and on weekends. During its existence, it was the sole operating AM station in Batangas after the closure of DWAM 1080 kHz in 2002.

However, in mid-2011, the station temporarily closed down due to financial constraints and alleged poor management.

=== 2012-2013: Return of operations and second closure ===
The station returned operations by the latter part of 2012 as a joint operation by ConAmor and the Batangas City Public Information Office. With the resurrected format, the Quezon-based network shoehorned its syndicated material with the PIO's during the weekdays with room for local unaffiliated content within the broadcast day.

It covered the 2013 midterm elections. In July 2013, the station closed down for good due to financial constraints and signal interference with DZIQ 990 in Manila. This left Batangas without an AM station until 2017, when DZBR 531 went on air.

== Area of coverage ==
DWAW's signal covered all Batangas province and neighboring areas to the north and east. It had a northward directional antenna angle in order to protect the nighttime signal of DYSS, a Cebu-based station broadcasting on the same frequency with 10 kW of power. However, DWAW's proximity to Cebu's full-power operation on its frequency and DZIQ 990 heavily affect the signal of the station due to the latter's 50,000 watt maximum signal strength, hastening DWAW's closure in 2013.
