= DZCT =

Super Tunog Pinoy (DZCT)
- Tayabas; Philippines
- Broadcast area: Quezon and surrounding areas
- Frequency: 105.3 MHz
- Branding: 105.3 Super Tunog Pinoy; The Big 30K

Programming
- Language: Filipino
- Format: OPM, Talk

Ownership
- Owner: DCG Radio-TV Network; (Katigbak Enterprises, Inc.)
- Sister stations: DWTI, 95.1 Kiss FM

History
- First air date: 2009
- Former names: Radio City (2009-2014); DWLA relay (2014-2017)
- Call sign meaning: Radio City (former branding)

Technical information
- Licensing authority: NTC
- Power: 5 kW

105.3 Super Tunog Pinoy (DZCT 105.3 MHz) is an FM station owned and operated by DCG Radio-TV Network. Its studios and transmitter are located at 1022 DCG Tower 1, Maharlika Hi-Way, Brgy. Isabang, Tayabas.

== History ==
- 2009 - Radio City was inaugurated. It was formerly owned by Kaissar Broadcasting Network and operated by Southern Tagalog Sweet Life.
- September 2014 - Katigbak Enterprises acquired the station and became a relay of Retro 105.9 in Manila. Radio City moved to 97.5 a week later.
- June 2017 - It went off the air.
- January 2018 - Super Tunog Pinoy was launched with an all-OPM format.
