= DZRT =

Radio station in Puerto Princesa, Philippines

Palawan Wave FM (DZRT)
- Puerto Princesa; Philippines
- Broadcast area: Palawan
- Frequency: 91.9 MHz
- Branding: 91.9 Wave FM

Programming
- Language: Filipino
- Format: Contemporary MOR, News, Talk

Ownership
- Owner: Puerto Princesa Broadcasting Corporation
- Sister stations: DWEC Environment Radio

History
- First air date: April 12, 2010
- Former names: Radyo Tandikan
- Former frequencies: 102.3 MHz
- Call sign meaning: Radyo Tandikan (former branding)

Technical information
- Licensing authority: NTC
- Power: 10 kW

Links
- Website: palawanwavefm.com

DZRT (91.9 FM), on-air as 91.9 Wave FM, is a radio station owned and operated by Puerto Princesa Broadcasting Corporation. Its studios and transmitter are located at Brgy. San Miguel, Puerto Princesa.
