= DWIZ-FM =

Radio station in Dagupan, Philippines

Home Radio Dagupan (DWIZ)
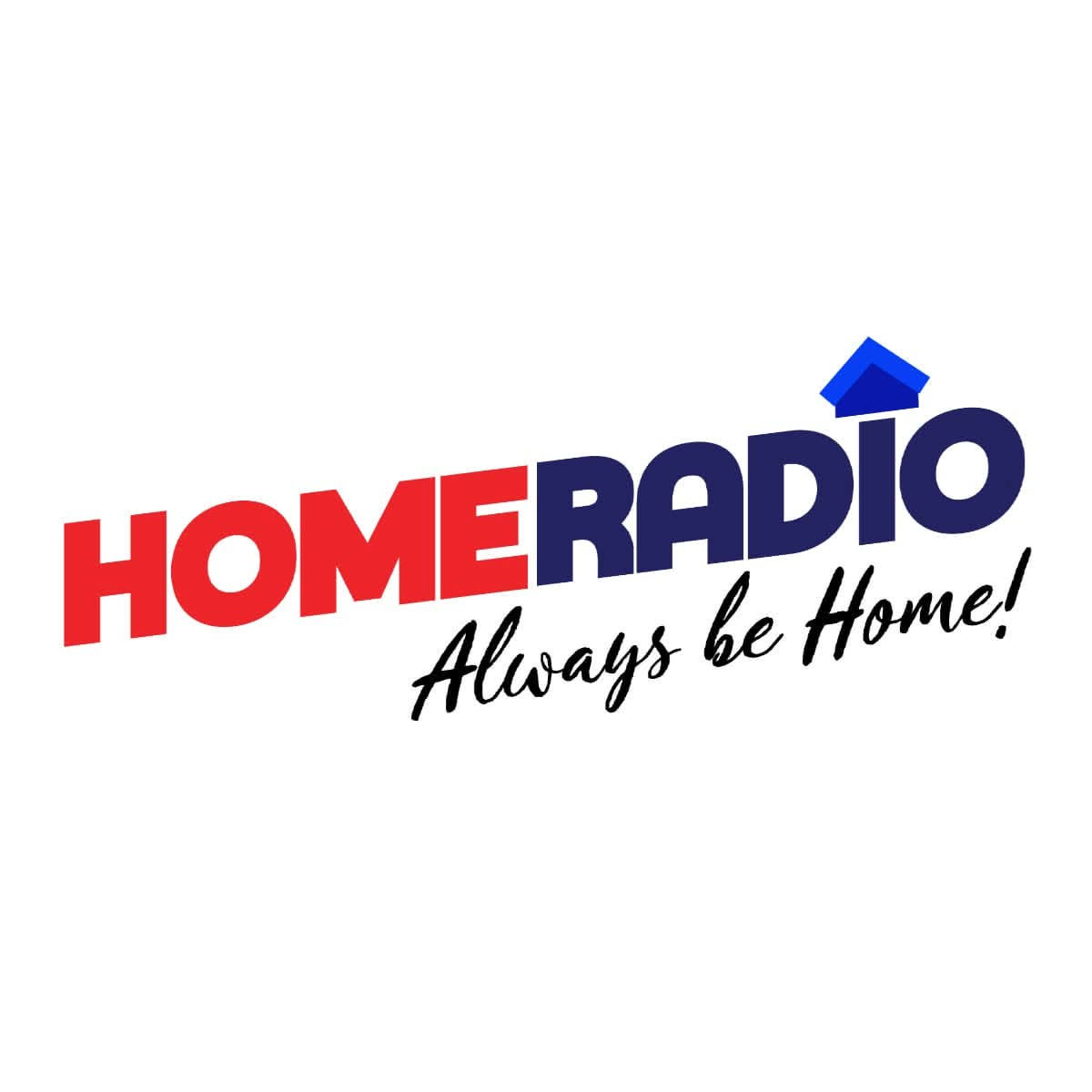
- Dagupan; Philippines
- Broadcast area: Pangasinan and surrounding areas
- Frequency: 89.3 MHz
- Branding: 89.3 Home Radio

Programming
- Language: English
- Format: Soft adult contemporary
- Network: Home Radio

Ownership
- Owner: Aliw Broadcasting Corporation

History
- First air date: 2009
- Former call signs: DWQT (2009–13)
- Former names: DWIZ (2013–26)

Technical information
- Licensing authority: NTC
- Power: 10,000 watts

Links
- Website: 893 Home Radio Official Website

DWIZ (89.3 FM), broadcasting as 89.3 Home Radio, is a radio station owned and operated by Aliw Broadcasting Corporation. The station's studio and transmitter are located at the 4/F, Bedbox Hotel Bldg., Rizal St., Dagupan.

== History ==
The station was established in 2009 as 89dot3 Home Radio under the call letters DWQT. It carried an easy listening format. On July 15, 2013, it switched to a news and talk format under the DWIZ branding, the first provincial station to do so, having its official launch on July 25. It was headed by former DZRH anchor Andy Vital. On April 30, 2026, DWIZ News FM made its final broadcast. On May 8, after a week of music automation, it was relaunched under the Home Radio network.
