= DWKI =

Kiss FM (DWKI)
- Tayabas; Philippines
- Broadcast area: Southern Luzon and surrounding areas
- Frequency: 95.1 MHz
- Branding: 95.1 Kiss FM

Programming
- Language: Filipino
- Format: Classic Hits, Talk

Ownership
- Owner: DCG Radio-TV Network; (Katigbak Enterprises, Inc.)
- Sister stations: DWTI, 105.3 Pakakak Ng Bayan

History
- First air date: 1989
- Call sign meaning: Kiss

Technical information
- Licensing authority: NTC
- Power: 5,000 watts
- ERP: 20,000 watts
- HAAT: 145 m (475 ft)
- Transmitter coordinates: 13°42′19″N 121°10′21″E

Links
- Webcast: Listen Live

DWKI (95.1 FM), broadcasting as 95.1 Kiss FM, is a radio station owned and operated by DCG Radio-TV Network (formerly known as ConAmor Broadcasting Systems). The station's studio is located at 1022 DCG Tower 1, Maharlika Hi-Way, Brgy. Isabang, Tayabas. Its transmission facilities are located at Mount Banoy, Talumpok Silangan, Batangas City.

== History ==
The station was signed on in 1989 as 95.1 KI FM, with an Adult Contemporary format. In the early 2000s, it rebranded as 95.1 Kiss FM, with a Classic hits format. In July 2015, the station transferred from its long-time former studios in Broadcast Village, Brgy. Ibabang Dupay, Lucena, to the newly inaugurated 1022 DCG Tower 1 in Tayabas. Over the recent years, it has evolved into a Full service station, airing talk during mornings & parts of the afternoon, but retaining its music format throughout the rest of the day.

95.1 Kiss FM is known to broadcast at a very powerful 20kW ERP that reach its signal even extends to Makati and Quezon City in the north, Romblon, and Boracay in the south and Naga City, Camarines Sur in the southeast via unclear signal and due to same conflict frequency of RW 95.1 FM (an FM radio station in Pampanga). Thus, it is also called as "South Luzon's FM station" by some. It is also the only FM station broadcasting out of Lucena City to reach the entire Quezon province, given the latter's vast territory.
