= DWKE =

Love FM (DWKE)
- Lopez, Quezon; Philippines
- Broadcast area: Eastern Quezon
- Frequency: 98.9 MHz
- Branding: Love FM 98.9

Programming
- Language: Filipino
- Format: Contemporary MOR, OPM
- Affiliations: Presidential Broadcast Service

Ownership
- Owner: Lopez Municipal Government

History
- First air date: 2012

Technical information
- Licensing authority: NTC
- Power: 1 kW

Links
- Website: lovefmlopez.weebly.com

Love FM 98.9 (DWKE 98.9 MHz) is an FM station owned and operated by the Municipal Government of Lopez. Its studios and transmitter are located at Brgy. Danlagan, Lopez, Quezon.
