= DWSJ =

Philippine radio station

DWSJ (Bambi FM)
San Jose; Philippines
- Broadcast area: Southern Mindoro
- Frequency: 97.7 MHz
- Branding: 97.7 Bambi FM

Programming
- Language: Filipino
- Format: Contemporary MOR, News, Talk

Ownership
- Owner: Tamaraw Broadcasting Network

History
- First air date: 1998
- Call sign meaning: San Jose

Technical information
- Licensing authority: NTC
- Power: 1,000 watts
- ERP: 5,000 watts

Links
- Website: http://www.bambiradio.com/

DWSJ (97.7 FM), broadcasting as 97.7 Bambi FM, is a radio station owned and operated by Tamaraw Broadcasting Network. The station's studio and transmitter are located along National Highway, Brgy. Labangan, San Jose, Occidental Mindoro.
