= DWTI =

- Lucena; Philippines
- Broadcast area: Southern Luzon and surrounding areas
- Frequency: 972 kHz
- Branding: DWTI 972

Programming
- Language: Filipino
- Format: News, Public Affairs, Talk

Ownership
- Owner: DCG Radio-TV Network; (Katigbak Enterprises, Inc.)
- Sister stations: 95.1 Kiss FM, 105.3 Super Tunog Pinoy

History
- First air date: 1986
- Call sign meaning: Tito Ojeda

Technical information
- Licensing authority: NTC
- Power: 5 kW

DWTI (972 AM) Kasamang TI is a radio station owned and operated by DCG Radio-TV Network. The station's studio is located at Broadcast Village, Brgy. Ibabang Dupay, Lucena.
