= DWMR =

Radio station in Puerto Princesa, Philippines

Radyo Pilipinas Palawan (DWMR)
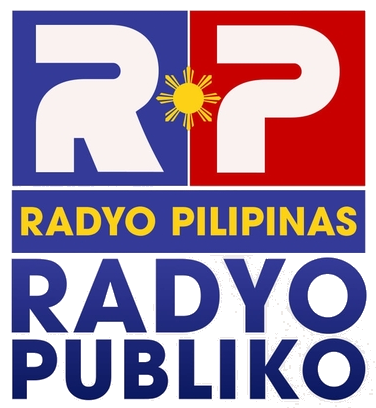
- Puerto Princesa; Philippines
- Broadcast area: Palawan
- Frequency: 648 kHz
- Branding: Radyo Pilipinas

Programming
- Language: Filipino
- Format: News, Public Affairs, Talk, Government Radio
- Network: Radyo Pilipinas

Ownership
- Owner: Presidential Broadcast Service

History
- First air date: June 8, 1991
- Former frequencies: 684 kHz
- Call sign meaning: Inverted as Ramon Mitra

Technical information
- Licensing authority: NTC
- Power: 10,000 watts

Links
- Webcast: LIVE Audio
- Website: PBS

DWMR (648 AM) Radyo Pilipinas is a radio station owned and operated by the Presidential Broadcast Service. Its studio and transmitter are located along National Highway, Bgy. Sta Monica, Puerto Princesa.

== History ==
The station was established on June 8, 1991 through the initiative of then House Speaker Ramon V. Mitra Jr., who represented the 2nd district of Palawan. Its goal was to bring government services and information to remote areas of the province through radio broadcasting.
