= DYAP-AM =

Defunct radio station in Puerto Princesa, Philippines

DYAP
- Puerto Princesa; Philippines
- Broadcast area: Palawan
- Frequency: 765 kHz

Programming
- Format: Silent

Ownership
- Owner: ABS-CBN Corporation
- Sister stations: DYCU-FM; DYPR-TV; TV-23

History
- First air date: 1965
- Last air date: May 5, 2020 (broadcast franchise lapsed/expired)
- Former call signs: DYPR (1965–2011)
- Former names: DYPR (1965-2011); DYAP (2011-2020)

Technical information
- Licensing authority: NTC

DYAP Radyo Patrol 765 logo before May 5 shutdown

DYAP (765 AM) was a radio station formerly owned and operated by ABS-CBN Corporation. The station's studio and transmitter were located at the ABS-CBN Broadcast Center, Mabini St. cor. Valencia St., Brgy. Masipag, Puerto Princesa.

Established in 1965 as DYPR, it is the pioneer station in Palawan. It was formerly owned by Palawan Broadcasting Corporation until 2011 with affiliations from RMN Networks, when it was acquired by ABS-CBN and rebranded as Radyo Patrol. Since then, the former staff of DYPR established DZIP.

On May 5, 2020, the station suspended its broadcasting activities, following the cease-and-desist order issued by the National Telecommunications Commission due to the expiration of ABS-CBN's legislative license to operate. On May 8, 2020, most of its programming resumed via online feed. On August 28, 2020, it signed off for the last time due to the House of Representatives' 70-11 vote to deny ABS-CBN's franchise renewal.
