= DZWI =

- Laurel; Philippines
- Broadcast area: Batangas, Cavite and southern Metro Manila
- Frequency: 107.9 MHz

Programming
- Format: Silent

Ownership
- Owner: Conamor Broadcasting System; (Katigbak Enterprises, Inc.)

History
- First air date: April 15, 2001
- Last air date: August 31, 2003
- Former names: Power 108 (2001-2003)

Technical information
- Licensing authority: NTC
- Power: 1,000 watts

DZWI (107.9 FM) was a radio station owned by Conamor Broadcasting System.

== History ==
Established in 2001 as Power 108, the station was managed by 713 Productions, owned by Marcelle John “H-Town” Marcelino. It holds the distinction of being the first station in the Philippines, and across Asia, to adopt an urban contemporary format. Throughout its history, the station’s studios have been based in Mandaluyong. Both the station name and logo were inspired by Los Angeles–based Power 106. Shortly after its debut, Power 108 quickly gained popularity among hip hop enthusiasts throughout Metro Manila.

Initially operating as an automated station, Power 108 introduced live DJs and special programs just months after its launch. Beyond Marcelino, the station featured several notable personalities, collectively known as the Power Jocks, including the late rapper Francis Magalona (under his on-air moniker The Mouth), T-Bone (now known as Tony Toni on Magic 89.9's primetime show Boys Night Out) and former MTV Philippines VJ and supermodel Sarah Meier.

On August 31, 2003, Power 108 signed off abruptly without any official announcement. Despite its strong signal reaching as far as the northern parts of Metro Manila, rumors circulated that the shutdown was related to licensing issues. Just a month later, Marcelino partnered with Noveleta mayor Dino Reyes Chua to form Empire Entertainment, which took over operations of 105.9 FM, The station was relaunched on October 20, 2003, as Blazin' 105.9, featuring many of Power 108’s original Power Jocks.

Since then, Marcelino has taken over Wave 89.1 and evolved into a serial entrepreneur. He founded Innovasia, a holding company with diverse ventures including Lino Electronics, H-Audio Technologies, Italyumm, Times Education Group Australia, and even an animal shelter called Homebound PH. Additionally, Marcelino is pioneering the future of radio broadcasting through a new initiative called Frequency.
