= DCG Radio-TV Network =

TV and radio network

Katigbak Enterprises, Inc. (DCG Radio-TV Network)
- Type: Private company
- Industry: Broadcasting
- Founded: 1986
- Founder: Joselito Ojeda
- Headquarters: Quezon, Philippines
- Key people: Joselito Ojeda; Domingo Garcia, Jr.

Katigbak Enterprises, Inc., doing business as DCG Radio-TV Network, is a Philippine media network owned and majority-controlled by the Ojeda family led by Mulanay politician Joselito Ojeda. Its corporate headquarters are located at 1022 DCG Tower 1, Maharlika Hi-Way, Brgy. Isabang, Tayabas.

DCG stands for Domingo C. Garcia, Jr., a stakeholder of this company. It is formerly known as ConAmor Broadcasting Systems, Inc. prior to Garcia's acquisition of part of the company.

== Radio stations ==
=== AM stations ===
| Callsign | Frequency | Location |
|---|---|---|
| DWTI | 972 kHz | Lucena |

=== FM stations ===
| Branding | Callsign | Frequency | Location | Operator |
|---|---|---|---|---|
| Kiss FM | DWKI | 95.1 MHz | Lucena | —N/a |
| Super Tunog Pinoy | DZCT | 105.3 MHz | Lucena | —N/a |
| DCG FM San Pablo | DZGF | 93.5 MHz | San Pablo | —N/a |
| DCG FM Batangas | DWLD | 88.7 MHz | Batangas City | —N/a |
| QFM | DZWI | 107.9 MHz | Lipa | —N/a |
| Zagitsit News FM | DWKP | 101.9 MHz | Legazpi | Jun Alegre |
| Solid FM Palawan | DWJI | 95.9 MHz | Puerto Princesa | Y2H Broadcasting Network |
| XFM Kalibo | DYKB | 96.5 MHz | Kalibo | Y2H Broadcasting Network |
| XFM Bacolod | DYKR | 96.7 MHz | Bacolod | Y2H Broadcasting Network |
| Strong Radio | DXKI | 90.3 MHz | Cagayan de Oro | Saturn Media Advertisement and Digital Marketing Corporation |

=== Former stations ===
| Callsign | Frequency | Location | Status |
|---|---|---|---|
| DWLA | 105.9 MHz | Metro Manila | Operated under an airtime lease agreement from 2014 to 2018. Currently operated by TV5 Network. |
| DWAW | 999 kHz | Batangas City | Off the air. |
| DWNG | 97.5 MHz | Lucena | Operated under an airtime lease agreement from 2014 to 2021. Currently off the air. |
| DWEI | 94.5 MHz | Mulanay | Off the air. |
| DYER | 828 kHz | Puerto Princesa | Off the air. |
