= DWAN-FM =

Radio station in Puerto Princesa, Philippines

Home Radio Palawan (DWAN)
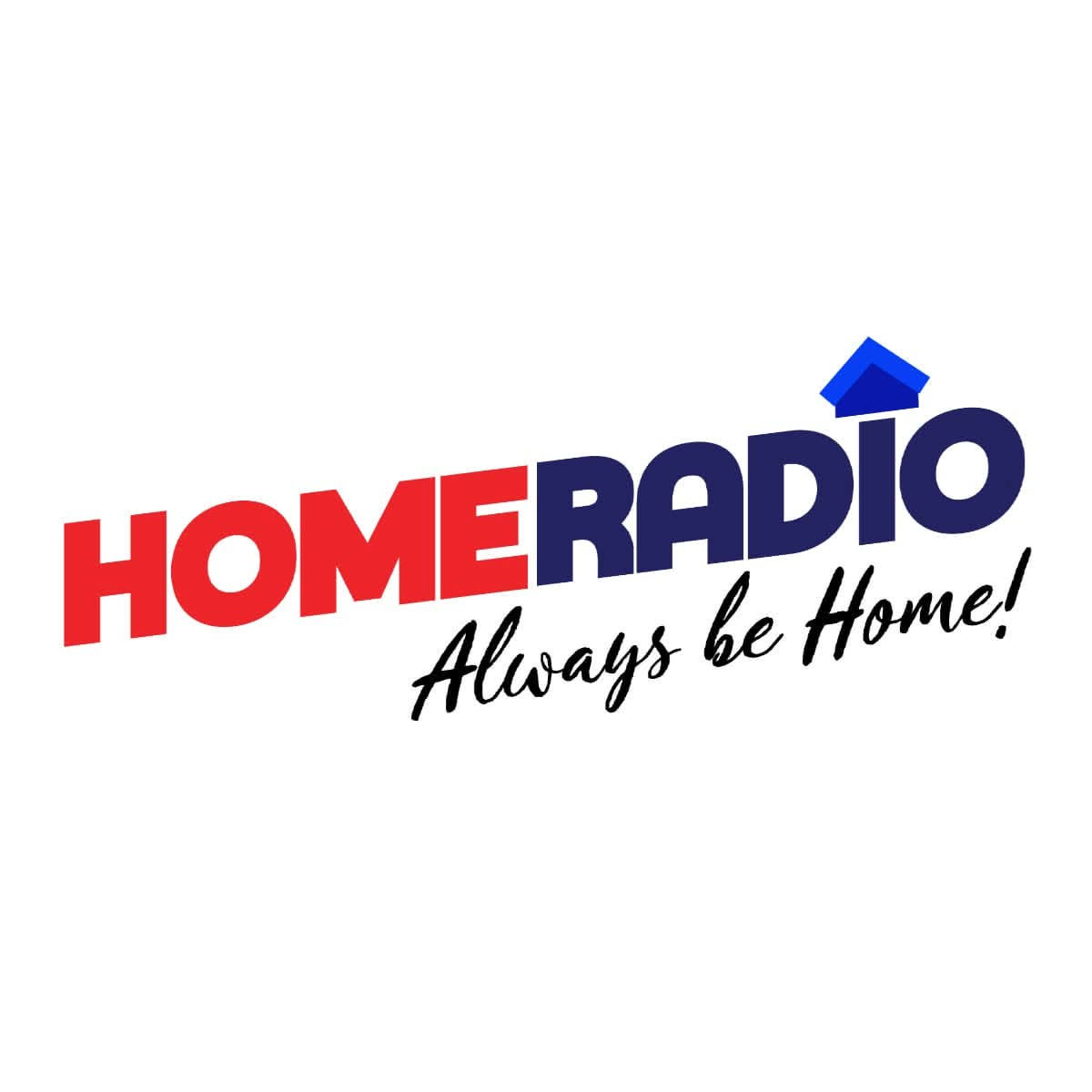
- Puerto Princesa; Philippines
- Broadcast area: Palawan
- Frequency: 94.3 MHz
- Branding: 94.3 Home Radio

Programming
- Language: English
- Format: Soft adult contemporary
- Network: Home Radio

Ownership
- Owner: Aliw Broadcasting Corporation

History
- First air date: November 28, 2014
- Former call signs: DWQP (2014–15)
- Former names: DWIZ (2015–26)
- Call sign meaning: Antonio Cabangon (founder)

Technical information
- Licensing authority: NTC
- Power: 10,000 watts
- ERP: 20,000 watts

Links
- Website: Official Website

DWAN (94.3 FM), broadcasting as 94.3 Home Radio, is a radio station owned and operated by Aliw Broadcasting Corporation. The station's studio and transmitter are located at the Citystate Asturias Hotel, Puerto Princesa South Road, Brgy. Tiniguiban, Puerto Princesa.

== History ==
Former logo.

The station was established on November 28, 2014 under the Home Radio network with call letters DWQP. In November 2015, it switched to a news and talk format under the DWIZ branding. On April 30, 2026, DWIZ News FM made its final broadcast. On May 8, after a week of music automation, it was relaunched under the Home Radio network.
