= DWEC-AM =

Radio station in Puerto Princesa, Philippines

Environment Radio (DWEC)
- Puerto Princesa; Philippines
- Broadcast area: Palawan
- Frequency: 1062 kHz
- Branding: DWEC 1062 Environment Radio

Programming
- Language: Filipino
- Format: News, Public Affairs, Talk

Ownership
- Owner: Puerto Princesa Broadcasting Corporation
- Sister stations: DZRT Radyo Tandikan

History
- First air date: 2004
- Former call signs: DYER (2004–2008); DYEC (2008–2016)
- Former frequencies: 828 kHz (2004–2008)
- Call sign meaning: Environment City

Technical information
- Licensing authority: NTC
- Power: 5 kW

DWEC (1062 AM) Environment Radio is a radio station owned and operated by Puerto Princesa Broadcasting Corporation. Its studios and transmitter are located along Mitra Rd., Brgy. Sta. Monica, Puerto Princesa.
