= DZDG =

Destiny Radio (DZDG)
- Tayabas; Philippines
- Broadcast area: Quezon and surrounding areas
- Frequency: 96.7 MHz
- Branding: 96.7 Destiny Radio

Programming
- Language: Filipino
- Format: Contemporary MOR, News, Talk

Ownership
- Owner: Caceres Broadcasting Corporation

History
- First air date: September 27, 1990
- Former call signs: DWLM (1990-2022)
- Former names: Sigaw (1990–2016); Gospel Radio (2016–2022)

Technical information
- Licensing authority: NTC
- Power: 5,000 watts

Links
- Webcast: Website

DZDG (96.7 FM), broadcasting as 96.7 Destiny Radio, is a radio station owned and operated by Caceres Broadcasting Corporation. Its studios and transmitter are located at Brgy. Calumpang, Tayabas.
