= DZBR =

Radio station in Tanauan, Batangas

Bible Radio (DZBR)
- Tanauan; Philippines
- Broadcast area: Southern Luzon, Metro Manila and surrounding areas
- Frequency: 531 kHz
- Branding: DZBR 531 Bible Radio

Programming
- Languages: English, Filipino
- Format: Religious Radio

Ownership
- Owner: Allied Broadcasting Center
- Operator: Cathedral of Praise

History
- First air date: 1981 (as Radyo Balisong); 2017 (as Bible Radio)
- Call sign meaning: Bible Radio

Technical information
- Licensing authority: NTC
- Class: B-Provincial
- Power: 10,000 watts
- ERP: 30 kW

Links
- Website: www.bible.radio

DZBR (531 AM) Bible Radio is a radio station in the Philippines owned by the Allied Broadcasting Center and operated by the Cathedral of Praise. Its studios are located at #350 Taft Avenue, Ermita, Manila, and its transmitter is located at the Angel One Tower, Tanauan, Batangas. DZBR operates daily from 5:00 AM to 12:00 MN on terrestrial radio, and 24/7 through mobile applications and website.

== History ==
=== 1981-2002: Radyo Balisong ===
DZBR was once known as Radyo Balisong of the Kumintang Broadcasting System and served as a full service station of Batangas from its launch in 1981. Veteran local radio personalities such as Danny Debolgado also known as Agila ng Batangas, Betting Mauhay, Erwin Aguilon and Dennis Datu were mainstays of the station, as well as neophytes Grace Beredo, Renz Belda and Larry Karangalan who had later successes in the field. Datu is currently with ABS-CBN, Aguilon left media industry after his stints in DWIZ and Radyo Inquirer and now working with the Commission on Elections, while Belda is with DZRH and DWAL-FM while Karangalan currently works with Radyo Natin Padre Garcia. It won in the 11th Golden Dove Awards as Best Provincial AM Radio Station, and its program Usapang Pangkababaihan as Best Provincial Radio Special. Radyo Balisong closed shop in 2002 as a part of cost-cutting measures and competition from FM stations.

=== 2017-present: Bible Radio ===
In mid 2016, DZBR secured its operations permit from the National Telecommunications Commission to return on the air under new ownership. Teasers of the new station were already posted as early as August 2016 while procuring its materials and assembling its hybrid feeds from Tanauan and Manila. DZBR returned on the air in January 2017 as a test broadcast before its full launch two months later. Programs of the Cathedral of Praise are fed on a hybrid pattern from Manila and Tanauan, respectively at different times of the day.

== See also ==
- Cathedral of Praise
