= DWDS =

Animo! FM (DWDS)
Lipa; Philippines
- Broadcast area: Lipa
- Frequency: 106.1 MHz
- Branding: 106.1 Animo! FM

Programming
- Languages: English, Filipino
- Format: College Radio

Ownership
- Owner: De La Salle Lipa

History
- First air date: June 2008
- Call sign meaning: De La Salle Lipa

Technical information
- Licensing authority: NTC
- Class: D (campus-educational)
- Power: 10 watts
- ERP: 30 watts

Links
- Website: De La Salle Lipa AB Communications Radio Guild

DWDS (106.1 FM), on air as 106.1 Animo! FM, is low-power radio station owned and operated by De La Salle Lipa through its AB Communications Radio Guild. Its studio is located at room MB 408, 4th Floor, Mabini Building, De La Salle Lipa, 1962 J.P. Laurel National Highway, Tambo, Lipa, Batangas, with transmitter located at the 7th floor.

== Station history ==
=== 2008-09: Launch and transmitter problems ===
DWDS was launched in June 2008 as a project of the Bachelor of Arts In Communication to gain an avenue for its students to test the radio medium for future employment. Plans for the station were already as early as 2007.

Its inaugural slogan that ran until February 2018 was The Best Campus Radio You Love!. Currently, it has been relegated as a secondary slogan.

In April 2009, however, technical problems caused the transmitter to bug down, causing the station to cease operations.

=== 2010–present: Relaunch and developments ===
The station was relaunched in August 2010 after a year of inactivity, However, problems still hound the station as it only employs one technical personnel and programming has become more irregular.

Typhoon Glenda (Rammasun)'s onslaught forced the station to cease operations until October 2014.

On February 8, 2017, 106.1 Animo! FM underwent technical maintenance, causing the station to go off-air until it returned on April 17, 2017. As part of its relaunch under new program manager April Rose Magpantay, it mirrored that of ALFM 95.9 Radyo Totoo by adding a religious programming block for its first 90 minutes after sign-on as The Daily Bread. Magpantay was succeeded in August 2017 by Rocelyn Fandiño.

Upon the change of leadership, infotainment shows hosted by undergraduates were added in the grid outside the religious programming block. This arrangement under the academics lasted for three months until Camille da Silva was appointed for the 2nd semester of academic year 2017–2018.

On February 26, 2018, the station discontinued its religious programming for undisclosed reasons. On March 9, 2018, it debuted its updated jingle and slogan, The Number One and Only One. Da Silva was succeeded as programming and Radio Guild head by CJ Andaya in July 2018.

On September 3, 2018, the station inaugurated an expanded Christmas radio programming block branded as 106.1 Animo! FM Christmas Service, broadcasting twice to thrice per week from September to November until expanding to a weekday basis in December. Prior to the expansion, the station only used the format - albeit informal, annually every December.

On February 15, 2019, the station underwent another phase of renovation with the procurement of a replacement antenna and new studio equipment as a part of the refurbishment of the AB Communications Laboratory. It resumed operations on August 6.

Upon the onset of the COVID-19 pandemic and the ensuing distance learning initiatives in March 2020, the station reduced its operations through twice a week broadcasts of music and pre-recorded "CommTapes" podcast series produced by the students with a possible return to pre-pandemic status quo in 2023.

== Area of coverage ==
DWDS covers the entire campus of De La Salle Lipa and the west-central portion of Lipa City. With a good radio receiver, listeners as far east as Barangay Talisay and as far south as the Ibaan, Batangas toll plaza of the STAR Tollway can pick up a grade B coverage from its 10-watt (ERP of 30 watt) signal, powered by a Harris in-studio switcher.
