= Bandera News Philippines =

Radio broadcasting company in the Philippines

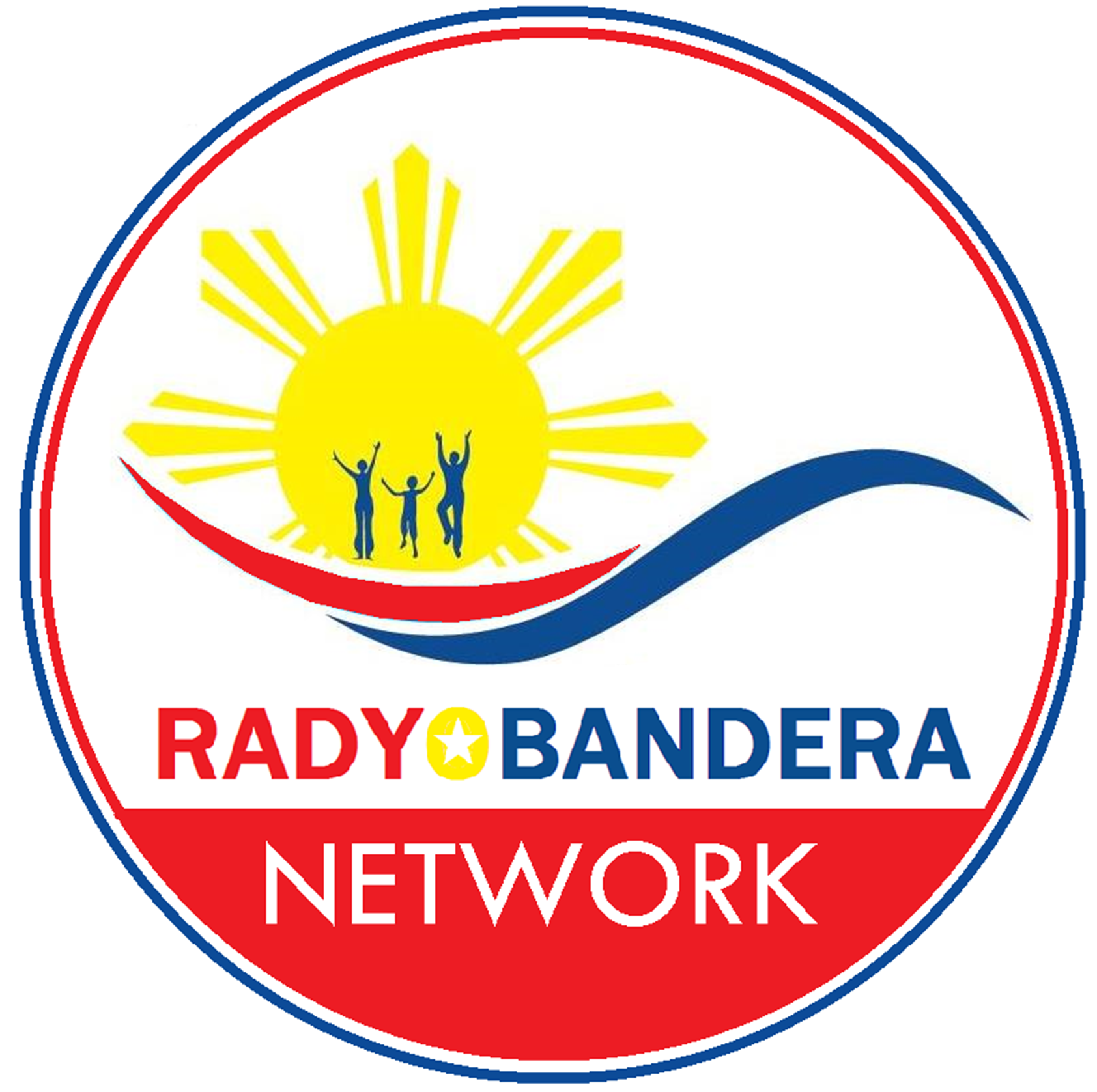
- Type: Private
- Industry: Mass media
- Founded: June 1, 2015
- Headquarters: Macasaet Business Complex, Roxas St., Puerto Princesa
- Key people: Elgin Robert Damasco; President

Bandera News Philippines is a regional broadcast company in the Philippines. Its main headquarters is located in Macasaet Business Complex, Roxas St., Puerto Princesa. Bandera News operates a number of stations across the country under the Radyo Bandera brand, with Palawan Broadcasting Corporation serving as licensee for most of its stations, as well as its own television station in Palawan named Bandera News TV.

== History ==
Bandera News Philippines was established in 2015 from Puerto Princesa, Palawan by former RMN Davao and Brigada News FM Palawan anchor Elgin Robert Damasco. After several months, the company expanded to different regional areas across the Philippines under the Radyo Bandera News FM brand, with Fairwaves Broadcasting Network as its original licensee.

In 2017, the network partnered with Ramel Uy's Xanthone Plus Broadcasting Services for stations in Western Visayas and Negros Oriental under the Radyo Bandera Sweet FM brand while maintaining separate operations from Bandera stations directly managed from Puerto Princesa. In November 2023, Uy ended partnership with Bandera News, with all Radyo Bandera Sweet FM stations rebranding as K5 News FM by December 1.

On November 27, 2023, the National Telecommunications Commission (NTC) issued a cease-and-desist order against radio stations licensed under Fairwaves Broadcasting Network, due to the expiry of its legislative broadcast franchise in 2020. Among the stations affected by the order were in Bukidnon, Villanueva, Misamis Oriental and Iligan, the latter which was never given a renewable broadcast license. Damasco contended that the Bandera stations under Fairwaves had their ownership transferred to Palawan Broadcasting Corporation after the latter's own broadcast franchise renewal was granted in 2021.

== Radio stations ==
The following is a list of radio stations owned and affiliated by Bandera News Philippines.

Name	Callsign	Frequency	Location
Radyo Bandera Palawan	DZPA	89.5 MHz	Puerto Princesa
Radyo Bandera Española	DYEA	99.7 MHz	Sofronio Española
Radyo Bandera Central Luzon	—N/a	90.3 MHz	Malolos
Radyo Bandera Olongapo	DWFJ	107.1 MHz	Olongapo
Radyo Bandera Polangui	—N/a	90.3 MHz	Polangui
Radyo Bandera Catarman	—N/a	99.5 MHz	Catarman
Radyo Bandera Bohol	—N/a	90.3 MHz	Talibon
Radyo Bandera Bayugan	DXFT	101.3 MHz	Bayugan
Radyo Bandera Tandag	DXFJ	100.7 MHz	Tandag
Radyo Bandera Cagwait	—N/a	95.1 MHz	Cagwait
Radyo Bandera Bislig	—N/a	103.3 MHz	Bislig
Radyo Bandera Mati	—N/a	95.1 MHz	Mati
Radyo Bandera Malaybalay	DXFP	88.1 MHz	Malaybalay
Radyo Bandera Valencia	DXFF	102.5 MHz	Valencia
Radyo Bandera General Santos	DXFQ	103.1 MHz	General Santos
Radyo Bandera Surallah	—N/a	98.1 MHz	Surallah
Radyo Bandera Tacurong	—N/a	97.3 MHz	Tacurong
Radyo Bandera Iligan	—N/a	100.9 MHz	Iligan
Radyo Bandera Cotabato	DXJN	105.3 MHz	Cotabato City
Radyo Bandera Midsayap	DXFU	100.5 MHz	Midsayap

== TV stations ==
Bandera News TV
- Type: Broadcast television network
- Country: Philippines
- Broadcast area: Regional
- Launch date: 2015
- Picture format: 480i (4:3 SDTV)
- Language: Filipino

Name	Callsign	Channel (UHF)	Type	Location
Bandera News TV	DWDW	39	Originating	Puerto Princesa

== See also ==
- 5K Broadcasting Network - Former affiliate of Bandera News in Western Visayas.
