= Aliw Broadcasting Corporation =

Philippine radio and television network

- Type: Private
- Industry: Mass Media; Broadcasting
- Founded: May 12, 1991
- Headquarters: Citystate Centre, 709 Shaw Boulevard, Brgy. Oranbo, Pasig, Metro Manila, Philippines
- Key people: J. Antonio A. Cabangon, Jr. (Chairman); Benjamin V. Ramos (President, Aliw Broadcasting Corporation, Broadreach Media Holdings and Nine Media Corporation and President and CEO, Radio Philippines Network); D. Adrian "Randy" Cabangon (President, Insular Broadcasting System); Atty. Mcneil Rante (Executive Vice President and General Manager)
- Brands: DWIZ; Home Radio; Aliw Channel 23
- Parent: ALC Group of Companies

Aliw Broadcasting Corporation (ABC) is a Philippine broadcasting company. Its corporate office and studios are located at the 20th floor of Citystate Centre, 709 Shaw Blvd., Brgy. Oranbo, Pasig. It is one of the broadcast media assets of the ALC Group of Companies, alongside RPN, NewsWatch Plus and Nine Media. Aliw operates a number of radio stations under the Home Radio, and DWIZ brands, as well as its only digital television and cable channel, ALIW Channel 23.

== History ==
Aliw was established on May 12, 1991, with the acquisition of DWIZ from Manila Broadcasting Company. The station would later on become among the top-rated news and talk stations in Metro Manila. A year later, it established a number of FM stations across the country. These stations would be later known as Home Radio.

On May 3, 2016, Philippine President Benigno S. Aquino III signed Republic Act No. 10790, an act amending the franchise of Aliw Broadcasting Corporation and Renewing/Extending the term thereof to another twenty-five (25) years that shall take effect on April 13, 2017.

On January 5, 2022, the National Telecommunications Commission awarded Channel 23 to Aliw Broadcasting Corporation under a provisional authority license. The channel was formerly used by Studio 23 and S+A of ABS-CBN Corporation. This marks Aliw's venture into television. On May 6, 2022, the channel launched its broadcast with a live video feed of DWIZ, in which it would be later known as IZTV. On January 30, 2023, it was relaunched as ALIW Channel 23. It was officially launched on June 23, 2023, with the tagline Reaching and Engaging More Filipinos Nationwide and Worldwide.

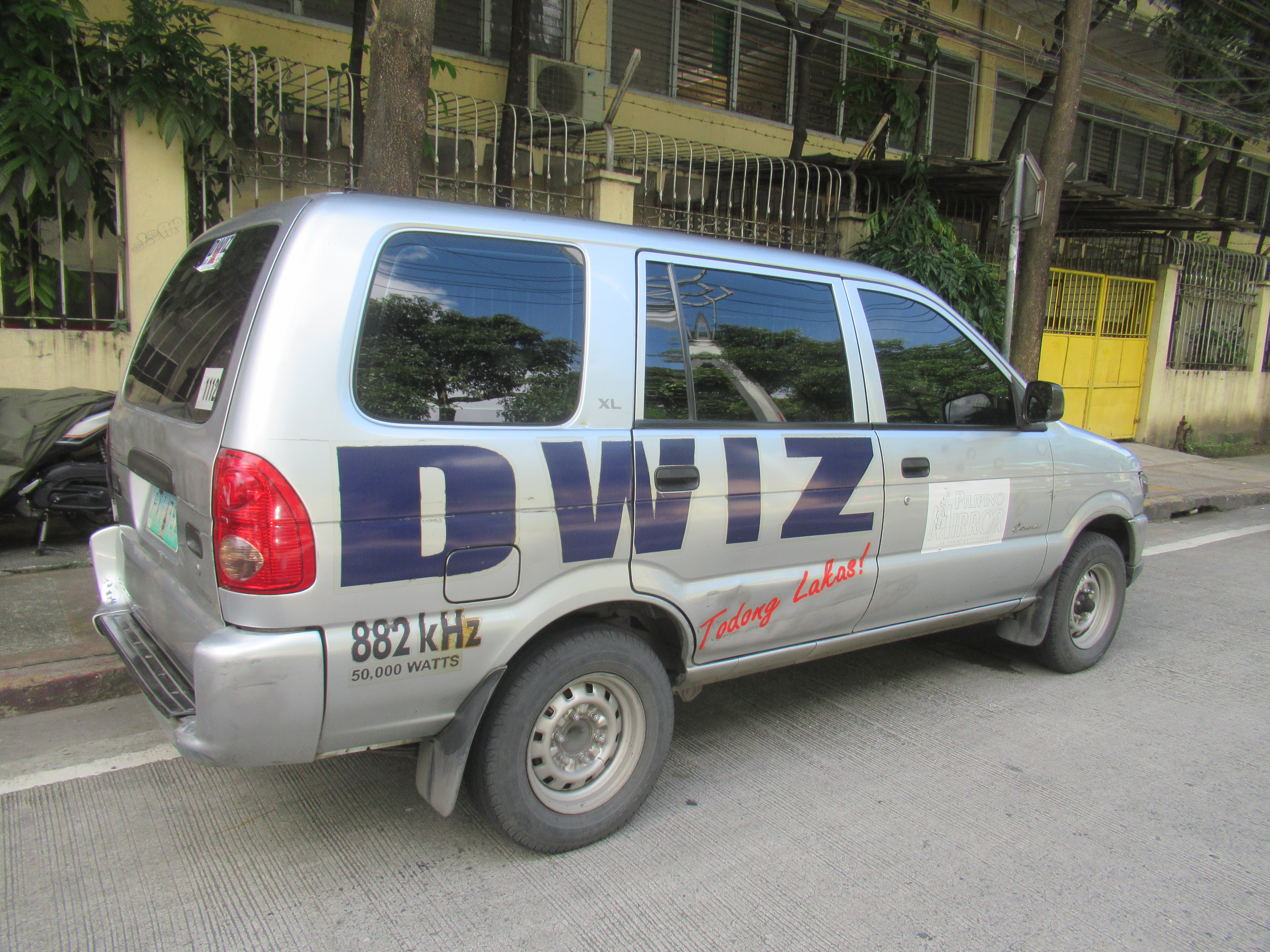
Broadcasting vehicle at Makati

On January 30, 2023, Home Radio's provincial stations were relaunched under the DWIZ network, collectively known as DWIZ News FM.

On May 1, 2026, all of its FM stations temporarily dropped their respective branding, citing changes in the management. On May 8, along with the restoration of the said branding in Manila, its provincial stations were relaunched under the Home Radio network.

== Awards and recognition ==
The year 2014 served as a milestone for the station as it received several recognitions:

- Most Outstanding Radio Station of the Year awarded by the Rotary Club of Manila
- Best Magazine Program awarded to Siyasat by the KBP Golden Dove Awards
- Citation in the Best AM Radio Station category in the KBP Golden Dove Awards

Awards and recognition for the first half of 2015:

- Best Station Radio Category by the Universal Peace Federation
- Gawad Ulat for Most Supportive Radio Station by the Department of Social Welfare and Development
- Best Documentary Program awarded to Siyasat by the KBP Golden Dove Awards
- Lifetime Achievement Award by the KBP Golden Dove Awards given to Ambassador Antonio Cabangon-Chua – founder and chairman emeritus of Aliw Broadcasting Corporation
- Journalism Awardee of the Year by the Rotary Club of Manila given to Ambassador Cabangon-Chua – founder and chairman emeritus

Awards and recognition for the second half of 2023:

- Best AM Radio station - DWIZ awarded by the 7th Outstanding Men and Women Awards 2023
- Best FM Radio station - 97.9 Home Radio awarded by the 7th Outstanding Men and Women Awards 2023
- Best Male Newscaster - Dennis Antenor Jr. awarded by the 7th Outstanding Men and Women Awards 2023

Awards and recognition for the final half of 2023:

- Outstanding Broadcasting Company of the Year awarded by the Southeast Asian Premier Business and Achievement Awards
- Outstanding AM Radio station - DWIZ awarded by the Southeast Asian Premier Business and Achievement Awards
- Outstanding FM Radio station - 97.9 Home Radio awarded by the Southeast Asian Premier Business and Achievement Awards
- Best Radio Newscaster - Dennis Antenor Jr. awarded by the Southeast Asian Premier Business and Achievement Awards
- Best FM Radio Personality - Braggy Braganza awarded by the Southeast Asian Premier Business and Achievement Awards

Awards and recognition for the first and second half of 2024:

- Most Outstanding Television Network - ALIW Channel 23 awarded by Sovereign Seal of Business Triumph & Remarkable Achievers Awards
- Most Outstanding AM Radio station - DWIZ awarded by the Southeast Asian Premier Business and Achievers Awards
- Most Outstanding FM Radio station - 97.9 Home Radio awarded by the Southeast Asian Premier Business and Achievers Awards
- Most Remarkable News Broadcaster - Dennis Antenor Jr. awarded by the Southeast Asian Premier Business and Achievers Awards
- Most Remarkable Radio and Television Host - Braggy Braganza awarded by the Southeast Asian Premier Business and Achievers Awards
- Trusted FM Radio Personality - Braggy Braganza awarded by the Southeast Asian Premier Business and Achievers Awards
- Most Trusted Television Network - ALIW Channel 23 awarded by the 2nd Philippines Finest Business and Outstanding Achievers Awards
- Most Trusted AM Radio station - DWIZ awarded by the 2nd Philippines Finest Business and Outstanding Achievers Awards
- Most Trusted FM Radio station - 97.9 Home Radio awarded by the 2nd Philippines Finest Business and Outstanding Achievers Awards
- Excellent Radio Host of the Year award - Dennis Antenor Jr. awarded by the 2nd Philippines Finest Business and Outstanding Achievers Awards
- Trusted FM Radio Personality award - Braggy Braganza awarded by the 2nd Philippines Finest Business and Outstanding Achievers Awards

== TV stations ==
=== Digital ===
Branding	Callsign	Channel	Frequency	Type	Power	Location (Transmitter Site)
ALIW Manila	DWBA	23	527.143 MHz	Originating	5 kW	Nuestra Senora de la Paz Subdivision, Barangay Santa Cruz, Antipolo

LCN	Video	Aspect	Name	Programming	Notes
23.01	1080i	16:9	ALIW CHANNEL 23	Aliw Channel 23	Commercial Broadcast
23.02	480i	16:9	DWIZ NEWS TV	DWIZ News TV	Commercial Broadcast

=== Cable ===
Provider	Channel	Coverage
Sky Cable	72	Metro Manila
Cignal	23	Nationwide
SatLite	24	Nationwide

== Radio stations ==
The following is a list of radio stations owned By Aliw.

=== AM Stations ===
Branding	Callsign	Frequency	Location
DWIZ	DWIZ	882 kHz	Metro Manila

=== FM Stations ===
==== Home Radio ====
Branding	Callsign	Frequency	Location
Home Radio Manila	DWQZ	97.9 MHz	Metro Manila
Home Radio Dagupan	DWIZ	89.3 MHz	Dagupan
Home Radio Palawan	DWAN	94.3 MHz	Puerto Princesa
Home Radio Naga	DWQJ	95.1 MHz	Naga
Home Radio Legaspi	DWQA	92.3 MHz	Legazpi
Home Radio Iloilo	DYQN	89.5 MHz	Iloilo City
Home Radio Cebu	DYQC	106.7 MHz	Cebu City
Home Radio Cagayan de Oro	DXQR	93.5 MHz	Cagayan de Oro
Home Radio Davao	DXQM	98.7 MHz	Davao City
Home Radio General Santos	DXQS	98.3 MHz	General Santos

==== Lamrag Radio ====
Branding	Callsign	Frequency	Location
Lamrag Radio Tacloban	DYAW	89.5 MHz	Tacloban
Lamrag Radio Catbalogan	—N/a	95.7 MHz	Catbalogan
Lamrag Radio Calbayog	—N/a	98.9 MHz	Calbayog

=== Defunct/Inactive ===
Callsign	Frequency	Location
DWIM	936 kHz	Calapan
