= Palawan Broadcasting Corporation =

Philippine media network

Palawan Broadcasting Corporation (PBC Palawan)
- Type: Subsidiary
- Industry: Broadcast Television network and radio network
- Founded: 1965
- Founder: Ramon "Ray Oliver" O. Decolongon
- Headquarters: Puerto Princesa, Palawan
- Key people: Lourdes Ilustre
- Website: DYPR

Palawan Broadcasting Corporation (PBC) is a Philippine media network. Its corporate office is located in Puerto Princesa.

== History ==
Founded in 1965 by Ramon Oliveros “Ray Oliver” Decolongon, PBC launched DYPR, Palawan’s first local radio station.

In its early years, the station faced many challenges. Radio ownership was low among Palawan’s 20,000 residents, and broadcasts from Manila and nearby Visayan islands were limited. The Tinio Electric Plant supplied power only from 6 a.m. to 6 p.m., reaching less than half the population. In 1966, founder Ramon Decolongon died in a plane crash, and his father, Emilio Decolongon, assumed leadership as company president.

When Martial Law was declared in September 1972, all broadcast stations were shut down, but DYPR quickly resumed operations by establishing its role as an essential service. It had become integral to island communications, airing urgent personal messages—Panawagans— as a free public service. In 2006, DYPR broadcast in Tagalog and Ilocano and was affiliated with Radio Mindanao Network (RMN).

In 1986, PBC launched television broadcasts and became affiliated with ABS-CBN Corporation, which supplied some of its programming. This partnership ended on May 5, 2020, when the National Telecommunications Commission issued a cease and desist order after ABS-CBN failed to secure a congressional franchise. PBC reactivated DYPR-TV 7 in 2025 and is currently affiliated by Advanced Media Broadcasting System to broadcast ALLTV2.

On March 9, 2021, PBC President Lourdes Ilustre, dubbed the “Mother of Broadcast in Palawan,” announced DYPR’s relaunch with a daily newscast on a local station. DYPR began producing weekday morning and afternoon news programs, initially airing on DWIZ Palawan (Aliw Broadcasting Corporation; now broadcasting as Home Radio Palawan) from April 2021 to January 2022, and later on One FM Palawan (Radio Corporation of the Philippines) from January 2022.

On May 18, 2021, President Rodrigo Duterte signed Republic Act No. 11541, granting Palawan Broadcasting Corporation a 25-year legislative franchise to construct, operate, and maintain commercial radio and television stations, including digital TV and relay facilities, nationwide. Shortly after, ownership of Radyo Bandera stations under Fairwaves Broadcasting Network, whose franchise expired in 2020, was transferred to PBC.

== PBC stations ==
=== TV ===
Branding	Callsign	Channel	Affiliation	Transmitter location
ALLTV Palawan	DYPR	7 (VHF)	Advanced Media Broadcasting System	Mabini cor. Valencia St., Brgy. Masipag, Puerto Princesa
TV5 Tacloban	PA	40 (UHF)	TV5 Network, Inc.	Lukban St. Downtown, Tacloban, Leyte

=== Radio ===
Radyo Bandera

K5 News FM

The following stations are operated by 5K Broadcasting Network.

Branding	Callsign	Frequency	Location
K5 News FM Bacolod	—N/a	101.5 MHz	Bacolod
K5 News FM Dumaguete	DWFH	97.7 MHz	Dumaguete
K5 News FM Tanjay	—N/a	99.3 MHz	Tanjay
K5 News FM Don Salvador Benedicto	—N/a	101.5 MHz	Don Salvador Benedicto
K5 News FM Guihulngan	—N/a	87.9 MHz	Guihulngan
K5 News FM Hinigaran	—N/a	104.7 MHz	Hinigaran
K5 News FM Jimalalud	—N/a	97.1 MHz	Jimalalud
K5 News FM Ayungon	—N/a	103.5 MHz	Ayungon

Other brands

Branding	Callsign	Frequency	Location
XFM Isabela	—N/a	104.9 MHz	Santiago
XFM Tuguegarao	—N/a	95.7 MHz	Tuguegarao
Radyo Peryodiko	DZBP	87.9 MHz	Virac
JU FM	DYUM	89.7 MHz	Mabinay
Star Radio	—N/a	106.1 MHz	Catbalogan

=== Former stations ===
Callsign	Frequency	Location	Notes
DYAP	765 kHz	Puerto Princesa	Acquired by ABS-CBN Corporation in 2011, currently inactive.
DYCU	99.9 MHz	Puerto Princesa	Acquired by ABS-CBN Corporation in 2011, currently inactive.
