= List of radio stations in Metro Manila =

The following is a list of NTC-licensed radio stations in Metro Manila, a region of the Philippines, current as of June 2025. The tables can be sorted by call sign, branding, frequency, location, owner, languages and radio format. Also included below are defunct radio stations and Internet-only stations.

== Radio stations ==
Below is a list of radio stations in Metro Manila, whose coverage is in part or whole Mega Manila area.

Frequency	Branding	Call sign	RDS ID	Power	Studio location	Owner	Languages	Format
558 AM	DZXL News 558	DZXL-AM			San Juan	Radio Mindanao Network	Filipino	news/talk
594 AM	Super Radyo DZBB	DZBB-AM			Quezon City	GMA Network	Filipino	news/talk
630 AM	DZMM Radyo Patrol	DWPM-AM			Quezon City	Philippine Collective Media Corporation (operated by Media Serbisyo Production Corporation, a joint venture of Prime Media and ABS-CBN Corporation)	Filipino	news/talk
666 AM	DZRH	DZRH-AM			Pasay	MBC Media Group	Filipino	news/talk
702 AM	702 DZAS	DZAS-AM			Quezon City	Far East Broadcasting Company	Filipino, English, Chinese	Evangelical religious broadcasting
738 AM	Radyo Pilipinas - Radyo Publiko	DZRB-AM			Quezon City	Presidential Broadcast Service	Filipino	news/talk
774 AM	DWWW 774	DWWW-AM			San Juan	Interactive Broadcast Network (Radio Mindanao Network affiliate)	Filipino	news/talk, oldies
810 AM	DZRJ Radyo Bandido	DZRJ-AM			Makati	Rajah Broadcasting Network (Free Air Broadcasting Network, Inc.)	Filipino, English	news/talk
846 AM	Veritas 846	DZRV-AM			Quezon City	Archdiocese of Manila (Radyo Veritas - Global Broadcasting System; Catholic Media Network affiliate)	Filipino	Catholic religious broadcasting
882 AM	DWIZ 882	DWIZ-AM			Pasig	Aliw Broadcasting Corporation	Filipino	news/talk
918 AM	Sports Radio	DZSR-AM			Quezon City	Presidential Broadcast Service	Filipino	sports radio
954 AM	INC Radio	DZEM-AM			Quezon City	Christian Era Broadcasting Service International	Filipino	religious broadcasting (Iglesia ni Cristo)
1062 AM	Radyo Agila	DZEC-AM			Quezon City	Eagle Broadcasting Corporation	Filipino	news/talk
1098 AM	Now Radio	DWAD-AM			Mandaluyong	Crusaders Broadcasting System	Filipino, English	religious broadcasting
1134 AM	AFP Radio	DWDD-AM			Quezon City	Armed Forces of the Philippines	Filipino	news/talk
1206 AM	DWAN 1206	DWAN-AM			Quezon City	Intercontinental Broadcasting Corporation	Filipino, English	full-service radio
1242 AM	DWBL 1242	DWBL-AM			Mandaluyong	FBS Radio Network	Filipino	news/talk
1278 AM	Radyo Magasin	DZRM-AM			Quezon City	Presidential Broadcast Service	Filipino	public radio
1314 AM	DWXI 1314	DWXI-AM			Makati	Delta Broadcasting System	Filipino	Catholic religious broadcasting (El Shaddai)
1350 AM	Radyo La Verdad	DZXQ-AM			Caloocan	Information Broadcast Unlimited (operated by Breakthrough and Milestones Productions International)	Filipino	religious broadcasting (Ang Dating Daan)
1494 AM	Abante News TV	DWSS-AM			Quezon City	Supreme Broadcasting System (operated by Prage Management Corporation)	Filipino	news/talk
1530 AM	ME Radio	DZME-AM			Pasig	Capitol Broadcasting Center	Filipino	news/talk
1602 AM	DZUP 1602	DZUP-AM			Quezon City	University of the Philippines Diliman	Filipino	campus radio
87.5 FM	Republika ni Juan 87.5	DWFO-FM			Quezon City	Presidential Broadcast Service	Filipino, English	masa/contemporary MOR, OPM
87.9 FM	Radyo Katipunan	N/A			Quezon City	Jesuit Communications Foundation and Ateneo de Manila University	Filipino, English	campus radio, Catholic religious broadcasting
88.3 FM	Jam 88.3	DWJM-FM	JAM 88.3		Mandaluyong	Raven Broadcasting Corporation (Tiger 22 Media Corporation affiliate)	English	modern rock
89.1 FM	Adventist World Radio (AWR 89.1)	DWAV-FM			Pasay	Blockbuster Broadcasting System (operated by Adventist Media)	Filipino, English	Seventh-day Adventist religious broadcasting
89.9 FM	Magic 89.9	DWTM-FM	MAGIC		Mandaluyong	Quest Broadcasting (Tiger 22 Media Corporation affiliate)	English	top 40/CHR, OPM
90.7 FM	90.7 Love Radio	DZMB-FM	1. LOVE; 2. RADIO		Pasay	MBC Media Group (Cebu Broadcasting Company)	Filipino	masa/contemporary MOR, OPM
91.5 FM	91.5 Win Radio	DWKY-FM	1. WINRADIO; 2. 91.5		Mandaluyong	Mabuhay Broadcasting System (operated by ZimZam Management Inc.)	Filipino	masa/contemporary MOR, OPM
92.3 FM	92.3 FMR	DWFM-FM	1. KA-VIBES; 2. FMR MNL; 3. 92.3		Quezon City	Nation Broadcasting Corporation (operated by Philippine Collective Media Corporation)	Filipino	masa/contemporary MOR, OPM
93.1 FM	Monster RX 93.1	DWRX-FM	1. Monster; 2. RX 93.1		Pasig	Audiovisual Communicators	English	top 40/CHR, OPM
93.9 FM	iFM 93.9	DWKC-FM	1. 93.9 iFM; 2. Ang iDol; 3. Kong FM		San Juan	Radio Mindanao Network	Filipino	masa/contemporary MOR, OPM
94.7 FM	Mellow 94.7 BFM	DWLL-FM			Mandaluyong	FBS Radio Network (operated by Prage Management Corporation)	English	soft AC
95.5 FM	Eagle FM 95.5	DWDM-FM	EAGLE FM		Quezon City	Eagle Broadcasting Corporation	English	adult hits, OPM
96.3 FM	96.3 Easy Rock	DWRK-FM	1. EASYROCK; 2. DWRK96.3		Pasay	MBC Media Group	English	soft AC, OPM
97.1 FM	Barangay LS 97.1	DWLS-FM	DWLS-FM		Quezon City	GMA Network	Filipino	masa/contemporary MOR, OPM
97.9 FM	97.9 Home Radio	DWQZ-FM	1. HOME; 2. RADIO		Pasig	Aliw Broadcasting Corporation (Insular Broadcasting System)	English	soft AC
98.7 FM	98.7 DZFE	DZFE-FM	98.7DZFE		Pasig	Far East Broadcasting Company	English	classical music, Evangelical religious broadcasting
99.5 FM	XFM 99.5	DWRT-FM			Mandaluyong	Real Radio Network Inc. (operated by Y2H Broadcasting Network)	Filipino	news/talk, masa/contemporary MOR
100.3 FM	RJ 100.3	DZRJ-FM	RJ 100		Makati	Rajah Broadcasting Network (Free Air Broadcasting Network, Inc.)	English	adult hits
101.1 FM	101.1 Yes FM	DWYS-FM	1. YESFM; 2. 101.1		Pasay	MBC Media Group (Pacific Broadcasting System)	Filipino	masa/contemporary MOR, OPM
102.7 FM	102.7 Star FM	DWSM-FM	1. STAR FM; 2. 102.7		Pasig	Bombo Radyo Philippines (People's Broadcasting Service)	Filipino	masa/contemporary MOR, OPM
103.5 FM	All Radio 103.5	DWOW-FM	1. ALLRADIO; 2. 103.5		Mandaluyong	Advanced Media Broadcasting System	English	adult contemporary
104.3 FM	Capital 104.3	DWFT-FM	1. FM2; 2. CAPITAL		Quezon City	Presidential Broadcast Service	English, Filipino	classic hits (1980s/1990s adult contemporary music), OPM, news/talk
105.1 FM	105.1 Brigada News FM	DWBM-FM			Makati	Mareco Broadcasting Network (operated by Brigada Mass Media Corporation)	Filipino	news/talk, masa/contemporary MOR
105.9 FM	105.9 True FM	DWLA-FM			Mandaluyong	Bright Star Broadcasting Network (operated by TV5 Network Inc.)	Filipino	full-service radio
106.7 FM	106.7 Energy FM	DWET-FM	ENERGYFM		San Juan	Ultrasonic Broadcasting System	Filipino	masa/contemporary MOR, OPM
107.5 FM	Wish 107.5	DWNU-FM	WISH FM		Caloocan	Progressive Broadcasting Corporation (operated by Breakthrough and Milestones Productions International)	English	soft AC, OPM
government-owned station.

== Defunct radio stations ==
- DZMM-AM
- DWBC-AM
- DWBC-FM
- DWCD-FM
- DWNU (as NU107)
- DWRK (as 96.3 WRock)
- DWRR-FM
- DWRT-AM
- DWXB
- DZAR
- DZCA
- DZHH-AM
- DZIQ
- DZTV-AM

=== American colonial era ===
- KZKZ
- KZMB
- KZRH
- KZSO/KZFM

== Internet radio stations ==
This list excludes online live simulcasts of existing radio stations listed above.

Station	Studio location	Owner	Language	Format	Notes
Crossover Online	Quezon City	Mareco Broadcasting Network	English	smooth jazz	Carries former programming of DWBM-FM before flipping to top 40 as Q Radio 105.1 (2019-2023) and news/MOR as Brigada 105.1 News FM Manila (2023–present)
Fresh FM Philippines	Parañaque	Dan Cabisada	Tagalog	masa/contemporary MOR, original Pilipino music	—N/a
Green Giant FM	Manila	De La Salle University (managed by Student Media Office)	English	Campus radio, Indie, Contemporary hit radio, original Pilipino music	—N/a
MOR Entertainment	Quezon City	ABS-CBN Corporation	Tagalog	masa/contemporary MOR, original Pilipino music	Formerly DWRR-FM
One FM	Manila	Radyo Pilipino Media Group	Tagalog	masa/contemporary MOR, original Pilipino music	—N/a
Radyo Pilipino	Manila	Radyo Pilipino Media Group	Tagalog	masa/contemporary MOR, adult contemporary, original Pilipino music, talk	—N/a
Saved Radio	Pasig	Far East Broadcasting Company	English	contemporary Christian music	Formerly blocktime programming with DWET-FM
UST Tiger Radio	Manila	University of Santo Tomas (managed by Tiger Media Network)	English	Campus radio, Indie, Contemporary hit radio, original Pilipino music	—N/a
WXB 102	Pasay	Sutton Records	English	new wave music	Formerly DWXB-FM (defunct 1987)
