= Tiger 22 Media Corporation =

Media management in the Philippines

- Type: Media management and broadcast radio network
- Country: Philippines
- Availability: Nationwide
- Headquarters: Makati
- Broadcast area: Philippines
- Key people: Rufia Dorothy Vera (CEO)
- Established: 2011
- Affiliations: Broadcast companies owned by the Vera Group: Raven Broadcasting Corporation; Quest Broadcasting Incorporated
- Former affiliations: Advanced Media Broadcasting System (2011–2021); Blockbuster Broadcasting System (2011–2024); Real Radio Network (2011-2025)
- Official website: www.tiger22mediacorp.com.ph

Tiger 22 Media Corporation is an integrated media agency-based radio network in the Philippines. As of 2025, it is an aggrupation of two-partner radio brands under the Vera family: Jam 88.3, and Magic 89.9 and its provincial network Magic Nationwide.

== Background ==
The aggrupation network started out in the early 2000s as The Radio Partners Inc.

In 2011, the group was later reformed as Tiger 22 Media Corporation, established by Rufia Dorothy Vera as CEO. Tiger 22 Media has been known for its campaign projects for their radio stations such as the Zapped DJ Club portal, the Style Origin fashion series with Ayala Malls, and through on-air promotions with brand and establishment partners.

From 2017, Tiger 22 Media's partner stations organized One Sound, a live on-air concert event series on radio featuring OPM artists.

Since 2020, amid the economic effects of the COVID-19 pandemic, and an increasing change in listenership from traditional to streaming media, the Vera-owned properties began layoffs on employees and on-air hosts, as well as selling off stations or leasing its portfolio to third-party providers. In 2021, the Veras transferred ownership of AMBS and its stations to Planet Cable, run by the family of businessman and former Senate president Manny Villar. Later, Magic Nationwide began winding down regional operations, with most being leased to 5K Broadcasting Network, and Y2H Broadcasting Network (which also began operating 99.5 FM in 2025). 89.1 FM, meanwhile, leased its programming to Adventist Media in mid-2024.

== Stations ==
The following is a list of radio stations owned and affiliated by Tiger 22 Media.

Note: Tiger 22 Media does not have its own station but is counted as owned-and-operated by their partner stations' owners related to the Vera Group. These stations credited their promotion as "part of" (and not "owned by") Tiger 22 Media through live broadcast events (such as the One Sound series), promotional sponsorship through radio and digital/social media, and on through their stations' websites.

=== Current ===
Branding	Callsign	Frequency	Location	Owner
Jam 88.3	DWJM-FM	88.3 MHz	Metro Manila	Raven Broadcasting Corporation
Magic 89.9	DWTM-FM	89.9 MHz	Metro Manila	Quest Broadcasting
Magic 95.5 Zamboanga	DXEL-FM	95.5 MHz	Zamboanga	GBPI, affiliated by Quest Broadcasting

=== Former ===
Callsign	Frequency	Location	Owner	Notes
DWAV-FM	89.1 MHz	Metro Manila	Blockbuster Broadcasting System	Currently operated by Adventist Media under airtime lease.
DWRT-FM	99.5 MHz	Metro Manila	Real Radio Network Inc.	Currently operated by Y2H Broadcasting Network under airtime lease.
DWOW-FM	103.5 MHz	Metro Manila	Advanced Media Broadcasting System	Acquired by the Villar-backed firm Planet Cable.
DYBN-FM	92.3 MHz	Cebu	Quest Broadcasting	Currently operated by Y2H Broadcasting Network under airtime lease.
DXBE-FM	89.1 MHz	Davao	Quest Broadcasting	Currently operated by Y2H Broadcasting Network under airtime lease.
DXKB-FM	89.3 MHz	Cagayan de Oro	Quest Broadcasting	Currently operated by 5K Broadcasting Network under airtime lease.
DYBE-FM	106.3 MHz	Bacolod	Quest Broadcasting	Currently operated by 5K Broadcasting Network under airtime lease.
DXKM-FM	106.3 MHz	General Santos	Advanced Media Broadcasting System	Currently off-air.
DXNS-FM	102.3 MHz	Butuan	Northern Mindanao Broadcasting System	Currently off-air.
DYII-FM	92.7 MHz	Tagbilaran	Vimcontu Broadcasting Corporation	Currently operated by Groove Deejayz Entertainment Solutions under airtime lease.
