= Killer bees =

Killer bees most often refers to Africanized bees, a hybrid of the African honey bee with various European honey bees.

Killer bees or Killer B's may also refer to:

== Film and television ==
- Killer Bees (1974 film), a television movie featuring Gloria Swanson
- Killer Bees! (2002 film), a film broadcast by Horror Channel
- Killer Bees (2008 film) (Die Bienen — Tödliche Bedrohung), a German horror film
- Killer Bees (2017 film), an American documentary film
- "Killer Bees" (Boy Meets World), a 1993 television episode
- Killer Bee (Naruto), a fictional character in the anime and manga series Naruto
- The Killer Bees (SNL), a recurring sketch on the American comedy program Saturday Night Live
- The Killer Bees (Ned's Declassified School Survival Guide characters), fictional characters in the TV series Ned's Declassified School Survival Guide

== Music ==
- Killer Bee (band), a Swedish-Canadian rock band formed by Anders Rönnblom and Brian Frank
- Wu-Tang Killa Beez, a collective nickname for affiliates of the Wu-Tang Clan rap group
- The Killer Bees, an American funk/soul/rock band co-founded by Papa Mali
- WXKB, a Top 40 music radio station in Cape Coral, Florida nicknamed "The Killer B"
- Killer Bee, a former branding of Quest Broadcasting's regional stations in the Philippines:
  - DYBN (92.3 Cebu)
  - DYBE (106.3 Bacolod)
  - DXKB (89.3 Cagayan de Oro)
  - DXKM (General Santos) (106.3 General Santos)

== Sports ==
- Bridgehampton School, nickname of a high school basketball team featured in the 2017 documentary film
- The Killer Bees (professional wrestling), a professional wrestling tag team
- Killer B's (Houston Astros), collective nickname for six Houston Astros players in the 1990s and early 2000s
- Killer B's (Miami), collective nickname for eight Miami Dolphins defensive players in the 1980s
- Rio Grande Valley Killer Bees (disambiguation)
  - Rio Grande Valley Killer Bees (NAHL), a former North American Hockey League team based in Hidalgo, Texas, US
  - Rio Grande Valley Killer Bees (CHL), a former Central Hockey League team based in Hidalgo, Texas, US
- Group B, a 1980s class of World Rally Championship cars nicknamed "Killer B's" due to their poor safety record
- Killer B's (Pittsburgh), a nickname for three players for the 2013–2017 Pittsburgh Steelers: Ben Roethlisberger, Antonio Brown, and Le'Veon Bell

== Video games ==
- Killer Bees!, a 1983 video game for the Magnavox Odyssey 2
- Cammy, a character in the Street Fighter video-game series sometimes called Killer Bee

== Other uses ==
- Killer bees (business), firms or individuals employed by a target company to fend off a takeover bid
- Killer Bees (Texas Senate), a group of Texas senators who in 1979 went into hiding to prevent a quorum
- Killer Beez, a gang in New Zealand

== See also ==
- Hidalgo, Texas, known as the World Capital of Killer Bees
- Killer Beaz (born 1953), American stand-up comedian
- Swift KillerBee, a type of unmanned aerial vehicle
- Killer Tweeker Bees, 1997 album by American guitarist Greg Ginn
