= Killerbee 106.3 =

Killerbee 106.3 is a radio branding of Quest Broadcasting Inc. in the Philippines. It may refer to:

- DYBE-FM, a radio station in Bacolod City
- DXKM, a radio station in General Santos City
