= EMedia Productions =

Media company in the Philippines

Alberei Advertising Corporation
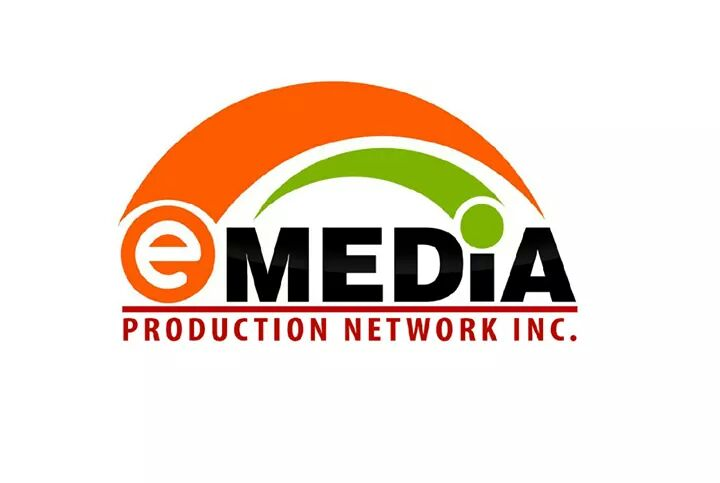
- Type: Private limited company
- Industry: Broadcast television and Radio network
- Founded: September 16, 2013; 12 years ago
- Headquarters: RBB Building, Villa Teresa Subdivision, Maria Clara L. Lobregat Highway, Divisoria, Zamboanga City
- Parent: Westwind Broadcasting Corporation

eMedia Production Network, Inc. (eMedia TV)
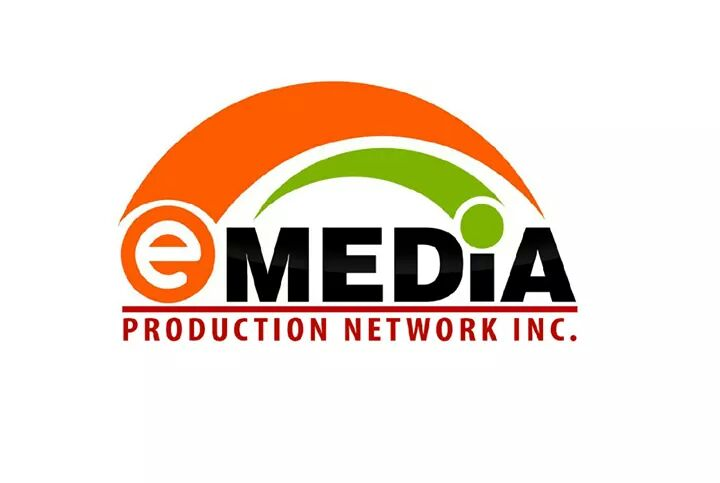
- Logo of eMedia Production Network, Inc.
- Country: Philippines
- Broadcast area: Zamboanga City, Zamboanga Sibugay, Basilan
- Affiliates: Westwind Broadcasting Corporation
- Headquarters: RBB Building, Villa Teresa Subdivision, Maria Clara L. Lobregat Highway, Divisoria, Zamboanga City

Ownership
- Owner: Radio Mindanao Network (2013-2014); Alberei Advertising Corporation (2014-present)

History
- Launched: September 16, 2013; 12 years ago
- Former names: RMN TV Zamboanga (2013-2014)

Availability

Terrestrial
- Digital (ISDB-Tb): Channel 40 (Zamboanga City)(LCN: 0.01)

Streaming media
- Facebook Live: Watch Live

DXAX-DTV
- Zamboanga City; Philippines
- Channels: Digital: 40 (UHF) (ISDB-T)
- Branding: eMedia Digital

Programming
- Affiliations: eMedia Production

Ownership
- Owner: Westwind Broadcasting Corporation

History
- Founded: September 16, 2013; 12 years ago
- Former call signs: DXAX-TV (2013-2018)
- Former channel numbers: Analog: 57 (UHF, 2013-2014); 37 (UHF, 2014-2018)
- Former affiliations: RMN (2013-2014)

Technical information
- Licensing authority: NTC
- Power: 1,000 watts
- ERP: 2,000 watts

105.9 eMedia Mo FM (DXWW)
- Zamboanga City; Philippines
- Broadcast area: Zamboanga
- Frequency: 105.9 MHz

Programming
- Languages: Chavacano, Filipino
- Format: News, Talk

Ownership
- Owner: Westwind Broadcasting Corporation; (Alberei Advertising Corporation)

History
- First air date: 2013
- Call sign meaning: WW for "Westwind"

Technical information
- Licensing authority: NTC
- Power: 10,000 watts
- ERP: 40,000 watts

eMedia Productions (branded as eMedia Mo!; lit. 'Your eMedia'!) is a Philippine radio and television production company based in Zamboanga City. It serves its home city as well as the provinces of Basilan and Zamboanga Sibugay.

eMedia Productions currently operates as a content provider for Westwind Broadcasting Corporation.

It is currently a local news affiliate of All TV, operated by the Advanced Media Broadcasting System.

== History ==
The network emerged as a result of the Zamboanga Siege. The ground zero of the siege was just a few blocks away from the Radio Mindanao Network (RMN) studios located at the ZAMEVECO Building, Pilar Street, Zamboanga City. The incident disrupted the regular programming of RMN's radio stations, DXRZ 900 AM and iFM 96.3. In response, the network focused on providing continuous coverage to keep Zamboangueños updated.

As days passed, the demand for coverage increased. The company decided to provide live streaming through public television. Using photos and footage from the siege, it established RMN TV Zamboanga via UStream, later broadcasting through public television on Channel 37. The initiative was led by broadcasters Bong Simbajon, Gil Climaco, Jimmy Villaflores, and Weng Dela Peña. Television broadcasting services were provided by eMedia Productions, a division of Alberei Advertising Corporation, while the studios were supplied by RMN Zamboanga.

Alberei Advertising Corporation is a Zamboanga City-based advertising company with divisions specializing in marketing and advertising. The company owns several billboards available for rent and offers various advertising services within the city.

On September 16, 2013, RMN Zamboanga announced its availability on television through Channel 57 and on cable TV via Mindanao Cable Television on Channel 98.

During their test broadcast, DXRZ 900 AM gained significant popularity, leading to public demand for its content to be accessible on FM radio. At that time, only a few listeners used AM radio, with most relying on mobile devices equipped with FM band applications. Although iFM 96.3 initially provided FM broadcasts, the company decided to formalize RMN FM Zamboanga on 105.9 MHz. This allowed iFM 96.3 to resume its regular programming while RMN FM Zamboanga served as the relay FM station for RMN's DXRZ 900 AM, particularly during live coverage of the Zamboanga Siege.

The siege ended in October 2013, but shortly after, the city was hit by the worst flash flood in its history. RMN's DXRZ 900 AM, along with its relays on RMN TV Zamboanga and RMN FM Zamboanga, provided extensive coverage of the incident. Their live broadcasts on both TV and radio during these two major events significantly increased their popularity among Zamboangueños.

The series of events popularized their first slogan, Grabe Man! Dwele Sa'yo? (lit. 'That was severe! Was that hurt you?'). This spoof slogan emerged during the rise of "Chagalog," a mix of Tagalog words like Grabe Man and Chavacano words like Dwele Sa'yo. The slogan gained accidental popularity when broadcaster Gil Climaco frequently reacted with the phrase "Grabe Man" during their daily programming.

After the series of events and the city's return to normalcy, they introduced a variety of programming, including religious shows from Victory Church Zamboanga. Soon after, they began relaying programming from Radio Mindanao Network in Cebu City, as part of their broadcasting agreement with their parent company. RMN's growing popularity on both TV and radio prompted their local competitor, GBPI TV 11, and its subsidiary Magic 95.5, to debut a similar program called "Dateline Teleradyo" as their counterpart.

However, the individuals behind RMN TV Zamboanga eventually went separate ways. Weng Dela Peña moved to Brigada News FM as a major anchor in Brigada News Manila, before transitioning to Radyo Pilipinas 1 and eventually Super Radyo DZBB 594. Meanwhile, Jimmy Villaflores, who was the barangay chairman of Sta. Catalina, focused on responding to the needs of his constituents, who had been devastated by the Zamboanga Siege.

The TV network then decided to part ways with Radio Mindanao Network and establish its own entity. eMedia Productions, a division of Alberei Advertising Corporation, launched its own TV network under the same branding, "eMedia Productions." Along with Alberei's eMedia, Bong Simbajon and Gil Climaco were key figures, while Jimmy Villaflores, who later became a city councilor of Zamboanga City, played a crucial role in the company's formation. The team moved to their own studios at the RBB Building, Villa Theresa Subdivision, Maria Clara L. Lobregat Highway, Zamboanga City. Simbajon, Climaco, and Villaflores became the lead anchors of their news programs, debuting with "Ronda De Noche" (Chavacano: Nightly Patrol) and "Report Del Pueblo" (Chavacano: Report of the City).

With their separation from RMN came the separation of their radio station, RMN FM Zamboanga, which was rebranded as eMedia 105.9 News FM. The radio station now serves as a relay of the television broadcast, with additional in-house programming exclusive to radio.

All of its programs are broadcast not only on radio and television but also through social media platforms like Facebook. On September 30, 2024, the Facebook pages of eMedia Mo and eMedia Sports TV (the network's sports division) were taken offline for violating Facebook's Community Standards. While no official statement has been released regarding the cause of the suspension, a new page has since been created.

== Areas of coverage ==
As of 2018, their area of coverage includes:

- Zamboanga City
- Zamboanga Sibugay
- Isabela, Basilan
- Lamitan, Basilan

== Means of broadcasting ==
eMedia Productions (DXAX-DTV) is broadcast on digital TV UHF 40 in both Zamboanga City and Basilan.

In addition to free TV in Zamboanga City and Basilan, eMedia can be accessed through other forms of media coverage:

=== Digital channels ===
UHF Channel 40 (629.143 MHz)

Channel	Video	Aspect	Short name	Programming	Note
01.01	480i	16:9	eMedia Digital TV	eMedia TV	Test Broadcast
01.02	480i	16:9	ALLTV	ALLTV2	Test Broadcast
01.03	480i	16:9	PTV	PTV	Test Broadcast
01.04	480i	16:9	TV5	TV5*	Test Broadcast
01.05	480i	16:9	One Sports	One Sports*	Test Broadcast

* - this is also broadcast in digital via GBPI TV 11.

=== Cable Television ===
- Mindanao Cable Television - Channel 98
- Sky Cable - Channel 54

=== Radio programming ===
- eMedia 105.9 News FM (DXWW-FM)

== Programs ==
The list below includes the major programs of eMedia Productions. eMedia also offers short-term air blocks for major events happening in Zamboanga, such as local festivities, religious observances, and political matters.

=== Current ===
- Levanta Zamboanga (Chavacano: Rise Zamboanga) is the network's early morning news and talk program, airing every Mondays to Saturdays from 5 AM to 6 AM. It is hosted by Rey Bayona Bayoging.
- RBB (Report Big Break) Live is the network's morning news, commentary, and talk program, airing from 6 AM to 8 AM. It is hosted by Rey Bayona Bayoging, the president and CEO of the company.
- G.I.L. (Give It Live) is the network's editorial-based commentary program, airing Weekdays from 8 AM to 9 AM. It is hosted by Gil Climaco.
- eSumbong is the hybrid public service program of eMedia, airing Weekdays from 9 AM to 10:30 AM. It is hosted by Gilbert Manuel and Belsie Agustin, with Marlon 'Basti' Sebastian substituting when needed.
- Barangay eMedia Action Center is the network's afternoon public service program, airing Weekdays from 3 PM to 4:30 PM. It is hosted by Roel Ramos and Vilma Rodriguez.
- Nutrition School on Air, in partnership with the National Nutrition Council, is an afternoon program discussing the importance of health and nutrition. It airs Mondays & Tuesdays from 4 PM to 4:30 PM. The program is hosted by Rowina Pagotaisidro and Mariz Gonzales.
- Aviso del Bumbero, in partnership with the Zamboanga City Fire Department, is an afternoon program focused on fire safety and hazards. It airs Wednesdays from 4 PM to 4:30 PM. The program is hosted by FO3 Shiela Domingo and FO3 Ciaranelle Tan.
- Report Del Pueblo (Chavacano: Report of the Town) is the network's flagship regional news program, airing Mondays to Saturdays from 4:30 PM to 5:30 PM, with a replay on the same day from 8 PM to 9 PM. It is hosted by various anchors of eMedia and Lenie Sanson.
- Ronda De Noche (Chavacano: Nightly Patrol) is their nightly news program, providing the latest updates from Zamboanga City airs Weeknights from 6:30 PM to 8 PM, with a weekend edition airs Saturdays from 7 PM to 8 PM. It is hosted by Pai Chu and Joe Rebollos.
- VezTV (Vale El Zamboanga) (Chavacano: How Great Zamboanga is) – VezTV, short for Vale El Zamboanga TV, is a weekly travel magazine show hosted by Karen Grafia. The program originally started as a counterpart to ABS-CBN's Mag TV: De Aton Este, with Karen Grafia as the pioneer host. Later, the staff and crew from Sky Cable Zamboanga, along with Grafia, split off to create their own magazine program, VezTV. They began programming on GBPI-TV 11 in 2013 and later moved to eMedia Productions in 2016.
- Life of Victory is a religious program by Victory Church Zamboanga, featuring live streaming of their Sunday service from Grand Astoria Hotel. It airs daily from 5:30 PM to 6:30 PM.
- Mas Claro, Mas Decente, at Your Service is the network's Saturday talk and public service program, airing every Saturday night from 8 PM to 9:30 PM. It is hosted by Marlon 'Basti' Sebastian.
- City Hall Session is a 2-hour live broadcast of the city council session at the Sangguniang Panglungsod of Zamboanga City.

=== Former ===
- Mission 2016: Boboto Ako! was a special news coverage by eMedia Productions during the 2016 Philippine General Elections.
- Campus Headturners was the first talent and reality search on local television, partnered with Mediabro Entertainment and hosted by Karen Grafia. The first season ended on October 30, 2016.
- eMedia Oke Mo was a variety show where eMedia invited everyone to visit their studios in Divisoria, Zamboanga City, and sing along with the eMedia hosts every day at 3:00 PM.
- On The Spot with Gil Climaco was a talk show hosted by Gil Climaco, where he invited guests to discuss issues that mattered in Zamboanga City.
- eSessions was a nightly music session featuring local performances by Zamboanga City artists.
- Asunto Legal (Chavacano: Legal Matters) was a weekly legal affairs program hosted by Atty. Eduardo Sanson, the Dean of the College of Law at Western Mindanao State University.
- El Negosyo (Chavacano: The Business) was a weekly program that highlighted businesses in Zamboanga City.
- Cosa Ba? Conversa! (Chavacano: What? Just talk!) was their morning talk show, hosted by JV Faustino and Liza Jocson.
- eAgri Ni Bay (Visayan: This is eAgri, my friend) was a weekly agricultural program that provided agricultural tips to farmers and highlighted the agricultural business in Zamboanga City.
- Servicio Todo-Todo (Chavacano: We Provide Service) was a public service program of eMedia, partnered with government agencies in Region 9.
- News Timeline was the network's weekend morning news and talk analysis program, airing every Saturday from 7 AM to 9 AM, with a replay on Sunday at the same time (7 AM to 9 AM). It was hosted by Arvie del Rosario, April Pantaleon Araneta, and Mark Alviar Saavedra. All of the hosts have since left the network, with April Araneta currently working in the City Government of Zamboanga, and Mark Saavedra serving as the Barangay Chairman of Culianan and as one of the proctors at Ateneo de Zamboanga University.

== Slogan ==
- 2013 to 2014 - Grabe Man! Dwele Sayo? (lit. 'That was severe! Was that hurt you?')
- 2015 - Serving local. Broadcasting Global.
- 2016 - Hinde lang este radyo, TV este! eMedia Mo! (lit. 'This is not just radio, this is TV! Your eMedia!')
- 2017* - Hinde lang este radyo, TV este! eMedia Mo! Solid! (lit. 'This is not just radio, this is TV! Your eMedia! Solid!')
- 2021* - Mas pa na 100%, 105.9, eMedia Mo, FM SOLID!
- 2023* - eMedia, SOLID @ 10!

*the word "solid" was added to their current slogan as their strong message for their loyal viewers.

== See also ==
- Golden Broadcast Professionals, Inc.
- GBPI-TV 11 Zamboanga
