= DXDE-TV =

DXDE-TV (One Sports 29 Zamboanga)

Zamboanga City; Philippines
- City: Zamboanga City
- Channels: Analog: 29 (UHF); Digital: 51 (UHF) (ISDB-T); Virtual: 11.01
- Branding: One Sports Channel 29 Zamboanga

Programming
- Affiliations: 11.01: GBPI TV11; 11.02: TV5; 11.03: One Sports; 11.04: RPTV; 11.05: Voice of America

Ownership
- Owner: TV5 Network, Inc.
- Sister stations: DXGB-TV (GBPI TV11/TV5); DXXX-TV (RPTV); DXEL

History
- Founded: 1995
- Former affiliations: ABC/TV5 (1995-2011); AksyonTV (February 21, 2011-January 12, 2019); 5 Plus (2019-2020)
- Call sign meaning: DX; Ciudad DE Zamboanga

Technical information
- Licensing authority: NTC
- Power: 5 kW
- ERP: 20 kW ERP

Links
- Website: www.onesports.ph

DXDE-TV (channel 29) is a television station in Zamboanga City, Philippines, affiliated with One Sports. It owned by TV5 Network, Inc., alongside TV5 affiliate and company flagship DXGB-TV (channel 11) and RPTV flagship DXXX-TV (channel 5) under an airtime lease agreement with station owner Radio Philippines Network. Both stations share studios and transmitter facilities at the GBPI Bldg., Campaner Street, Zamboanga City.

Currently, apart from the DXGB-TV subchannel, DXDE-TV is also simulcast via eMedia's DXAX-DTV.

== See also ==
- One Sports
- DWNB-TV
