= DXAL-TV =

DXAL-TV (ALLTV2 Cagayan de Oro)
Relay of DZMV-TV
- Cagayan de Oro; Philippines
- City: Cagayan de Oro
- Channels: Analog: 4 (VHF); Digital: 16 (UHF) (test broadcast); Virtual: 2.01
- Branding: ALLTV2 Cagayan de Oro

Programming
- Subchannels: 2.01: ALLTV HD

Ownership
- Owner: Advanced Media Broadcasting System
- Operator: ABS-CBN Corporation

History
- Founded: 1969
- Former call signs: DXEC-TV (1969-2019); DXCS-TV (2019-2020)
- Former affiliations: ABS-CBN (1969-1972; 1986-2020); Intercontinental Broadcasting Corporation (1973-1986); Silent (2020-2023)

Technical information
- Licensing authority: NTC
- Power: Analog: 10 kW; Digital: 10 kW

Links
- Website: https://alltv.ph/

DXAL-TV (TV-4 analog; DTV-16 digital) is a commercial television station of ALLTV2. It is owned by Advanced Media Broadcasting System and operated under license agreement by ABS-CBN Corporation to affiliates Kapamilya Channel. Its transmitter and master control are located at Macapagal Dr. (formerly Greenhills Rd.), Brgy. Bulua, Cagayan de Oro.

== Digital Television ==
=== Digital Channels ===
UHF Channel 16 (485.143 MHz)

LCN	Video	Aspect	Name	Programming	Notes
2.01	1080i	16:9	ALLTV HD	ALLTV2	Commercial Broadcast

== Coverage Areas ==
=== Primary Areas ===
- Cagayan de Oro
- Portion of Misamis Oriental

==== Secondary Areas ====
- Northern portion of Bukidnon
- Camiguin
- Portion of Misamis Occidental
