= DYSR =

Radio station in Dumaguete City, Philippines

DYSR (SR95)
- Dumaguete; Philippines
- Broadcast area: Southern Negros Oriental and surrounding areas
- Frequency: 95.1 MHz
- Branding: SR95

Programming
- Languages: English, Cebuano, Filipino
- Format: CHR/Top 40, College Radio

Ownership
- Owner: National Council of Churches in the Philippines

History
- First air date: DYSR-AM: August 26, 1950; DYSR-FM: 1992
- Last air date: DYSR-AM: 2006
- Former frequencies: 840 kHz (August 26, 1950 – 1979); 891 kHz (1979 – 2006)
- Call sign meaning: Silliman Radio

Technical information
- Licensing authority: NTC
- Class: ABC
- Power: 5,000 watts

DYSR (95.1 FM), broadcasting as SR95, is a radio station owned and operated by the National Council of Churches in the Philippines. It is part of the Magic Nationwide network. Its studio and transmitter are located at Camp SEA Site, Brgy. Banilad, Dumaguete.

== History ==
=== DYSR-AM ===
==== 1950-1975: Beginnings ====
The station began as DYSR-AM as a test broadcast on July 1, 1950, beginning only two hours of broadcasting time in the evening, following the approval of House Bill #896 to establish DYSR. At that time, the station was owned by Silliman University as a nonsectarian and non-profit educational station. Operating at 840 kilocycles, the station at that time also operates as a shortwave station, operating at 6055 kilocycles on the 49 meter band.

The station would continue test broadcasts following the initial July 1 broadcast, with the notable extension of broadcasting hours and additional programming, until it was inaugurated on August 26, 1950. (Note: The July 8 issue of The Weekly Sillimanian mentions August 27, 1950, the eve of Silliman's founding, the inaugural date, while it was moved to August 26.)

Its initial staff of DYSR-AM includes Roy Bell as the director of DYSR, Abby Jacobs as the program director and Eliseo Araneta leading the engineering department of DYSR. Silliman's faculty working as part-time staff of programming includes Mary Reese as music director, Boyd Bell as director of farm programming and Justice Venancio Aldecoa (1926–December 14, 2017) as assistant director of farm programming. The latter later became the president of Silliman University from 1983 to 1986.

DYSR-AM became one of the notable firsts in Dumaguete radio when the station was launched, having notable in the following:

- The first radio station to launch in Dumaguete. (Launched on August 26, 1950)
- The first to be broadcast in shortwave.
- The first to air a radio drama as part of the programming schedule.
- The first to air select programming in English and in Cebuano

DYSR studios and its AM and shortwave transmitters at launch were located at the Guy Hall at Silliman University, where the College of Mass Communication was also located before moving to the Emilio T. Yap Hall in 2011. It was then later moved to Camp SEA Site in Banilad.

==== 1975-2006: Later years ====
DYSR-AM was notable for relaying what's known to be the city's first night flight on March 29, 1975, that led a Fairchild C-123K Provider aircraft landing safely in Sibulan Airport. At that time, the airport did not have runway lights until it was installed 42 years later. The provincial Philippine Constabulary headquarters relayed announcements through this station to car owners to go to the airport and light the runway using headlights, which various car owners responded to the announcement. The announcement on this station gave pilot Eugene Malahay and co-pilot Antonio Paulin time to land the aircraft safely into the airport.

In 1979 or in 1980, when the Philippines switched from the North American Regional Broadcasting Agreement or NARBA-assigned 10 kHz to the Geneva Frequency Plan of 1975-assigned 9 kHz, DYSR-AM switched frequencies from 840 kHz to 891 kHz. It went off the air sometime in 2006.

=== DYSR-FM ===
==== 1992–2005: Early years ====
DYSR-FM, in the other hand, was launched in 1992, monikered as "Sweet Rhythms". Throughout its early years as DYSR-FM, various monikers including "Metro Radio" and the first tenure of "SR95", which was then re-used in 2014.

It would become the last FM station to launch in Dumaguete until in 2013, when DYMD began doing FM operations.

==== 2005–2007: Wild FM ====
In 2005, the University of Mindanao's broadcasting arm, UMBN, took over the station's operations and rebranded as 95.1 Wild FM. The agreement with UMBN ended in 2007.

==== 2007–present: Killerbee/Magic ====
In 2007, Quest Broadcasting took over the station's operations and rebranded as KillerBee 95.1. In 2013, as part of the rebranding of all Quest provincial stations to be aligned with its Manila station, the station was renamed as Magic 95.1.

In the first quarter of 2014, the station reverted its branding back to SR95. A few years later, it ended its affiliation with Quest.
