= Heart 103.5 =

Heart 103.5 may refer to:

- Heart Sussex, in Brighton and Worthing
- DWKX, as branded in 2007
