= Advanced Media Broadcasting System =

Philippine broadcast media company

- Type: Private
- Industry: Mass Media; Broadcasting
- Founded: 1994
- Founders: Jose Luis "Bobet" Vera; Jinji Buhain
- Headquarters: Worldwide Corporate Center, Shaw Boulevard, Mandaluyong, Metro Manila, Philippines
- Key people: Manuel "Manny" B. Villar Jr. (Chairman); Manuel "Paolo" A. Villar III (Vice-Chairman); Maribeth Tolentino (President); Cecille Bernardo (CFO)
- Brands: All Radio 103.5; All TV
- Owner: All Value Holdings Inc.
- Parent: Planet Cable (Streamtech)
- Website: alltv.ph

Advanced Media Broadcasting System (AMBS) is a broadcast media company in the Philippines. Its main offices and facilities are located at Worldwide Corporate Center, Shaw Boulevard, Mandaluyong, Metro Manila.

Founded in 1994 by the Vera family, it is owned by the Villar Group-backed All Value Holdings Incorporated.

== History ==
=== Early years ===
The Vera family, under the aegis of Quest Broadcasting head attorney Jose Luis Vera, established Advanced Media Broadcasting System in 1994, with its Congressional franchise granted the following year. With the help of Jinji Buhain (niece of then-Manila Auxiliary Bishop Teodoro Buhain), AMBS bought 103.5 DWCS from the Roman Catholic Archdiocese of Manila and changed its callsign to DWKX which gave birth to adult contemporary station K-Lite. The station, along with four other Vera-controlled Metro Manila stations (Jam 88.3, Wave 89.1, Magic 89.9 and 99.5 RT) and the Killerbee provincial network, formed The Radio Partners in the early 2000s before being reorganized in 2011 under the new Tiger 22 Media group.

=== Under Villar ownership ===
The Paragon Plaza building, home of Advanced Media Broadcasting System

In 2019, AMBS was granted a 25-year legislative franchise extension under Republic Act No. 11253, albeit without President Rodrigo Duterte's signature, as the bill lapsed into law after 30 days of inaction. Due the effects of the COVID-19 pandemic, the company, including the station, was sold to Planet Cable of real estate magnate and businessman-politician Manny Villar.

On January 5, 2022, the National Telecommunications Commission (NTC), under the leadership of Gamaliel Cordoba, awarded AMBS a provisional authority to operate for the digital Channel 16 frequency (previously assigned to ABS-CBN Corporation) for an eighteen-month test broadcast period, and the analog Channel 2 frequency under a temporary assignment for simulcast purposes until analog shut-off in 2023. The construction of AMBS's own digital terrestrial television network in Metro Manila was expected to be completed in July 2022.

AMBS Manila began its test broadcast in June 2022. On September 1, TV host Willie Revillame announced that the TV station of AMBS would be named as All TV. Initially targeted on October 1, 2022, All TV made its soft launch on September 13, 2022, with plans to expand it nationwide by the end of the year. On July 15, 2022, during his contract signing with AMBS, Revillame announced that his variety show Wowowin would air on All TV. In February 2023, all the original programs of All TV were canceled or put on hiatus due to various reasons.

In January 2024, management and control of AMBS and its stations were transferred from Paolo Villar's Prime Asset Ventures Inc. to Camille Villar's All Value Holdings Inc. AMBS entered into a content partnership (later brand licensing from December 17, 2025) agreement with ABS-CBN Corporation to broadcast a selected number of current and previous ABS-CBN programs on All TV that began to carry the Kapamilya Channel broadcast feed on All TV from April 15, 2024 that will be known as Kapamilya Channel sa ALLTV2 , ABS-CBN sa ALLTV2, or ABS-CBN | ALLTV2. The channel simulcasted the new version of Goin' Bulilit. On January 2, 2026, Kapamilya Channel extended its airtime on All TV, replacing its sister station block Jeepney TV. The first programs to be aired upon airtime extension are Umaganda, Kapamilya Gold, and post-TV Patrol Primetime Bida timeslot blocks, followed by the rest of Yes Weekend! from January 3 to 4, 2026.

== Radio stations ==
Branding	Callsign	Frequency	Power	Location
All Radio	DWOW	103.5 MHz	18 KW	Metro Manila

== Television stations ==
=== ALLTV2 ===
==== Digital ====
Branding	Callsign	Channel	Frequency	Power	Type	Location (Transmitter Site)
ALLTV2 Manila	DZMV	16	485.143 MHz	10 kW	Originating	Diliman, Quezon City
ALLTV2 Manila	DZMV	16	485.143 MHz	1 kW	SFN Relay	BSA Suites, Makati City
ALLTV2 Manila	DZMV	16	485.143 MHz	1 kW	SFN Relay	Summit One Tower, Mandaluyong City
ALLTV2 Manila	DZMV	16	485.143 MHz	1 kW	SFN Relay	MacArthur Hi-way, Guiguinto, Bulacan
ALLTV2 Manila	DZMV	16	485.143 MHz	1 kW	SFN Relay	Brgy. Magyuam, Silang, Cavite
ALLTV Baguio	DWAY	30	569.143 MHz	10 kW	Relay	Mt. Sto. Tomas, Tuba, Benguet
ALLTV Ilocos Norte	PA	16	485.143 MHz	1 kW	Relay	Brgy. San Lorenzo, San Nicolas, Ilocos Norte
ALLTV Isabela	PA	16	485.143 MHz	1 kW	Relay	Maharlika Highway, Brgy. Victory Norte, Santiago, Isabela
ALLTV Pampanga	DWAP	34	593.143 MHz	5 kW	Relay	Brgy. Lara, San Fernando, Pampanga
ALLTV Tarlac	DWAL	34	593.143 MHz	5 kW	Relay	Brgy. Sto. Cristo, McArthur Highway, Tarlac City
ALLTV Bulacan	DWAU	34	593.143 MHz	5 kW	Relay	Cagayan Valley Road, Brgy. Vicente, San Miguel, Bulacan
ALLTV Batangas	DWAD	46	665.143 MHz	10 kW	Relay	Mt. Banoy, Batangas
ALLTV San Pablo	DWAV	46	665.143 MHz	5 kW	Relay	San Pablo, Laguna
ALLTV Jalajala	PA	16	485.143 MHz	5 kW	Relay	Mt. Landing, Jalajala, Rizal
ALLTV Iloilo	PA	16	485.143 MHz	10 kW	Relay	Brgy. Alaguisoc, Jordan, Guimaras
ALLTV Bacolod	DYAG	16	485.143 MHz	5 kW	Relay	Mt. Kanlandog, Murcia, Negros Occidental
ALLTV Cebu	DYAE	16	485.143 MHz	10 kW	Relay	Brgy. Babag 1, Mt. Busay, Cebu City
ALLTV Cagayan de Oro	DXAL	16	485.143 MHz	10 kW	Relay	Macapagal Drive, Brgy. Bulua, Cagayan de Oro
ALLTV Davao	DXAK	16	485.143 MHz	10 kW	Relay	Broadcast Ave., Shrine Hills, Matina, Davao City

LCN	Video	Aspect	Name	Programming	Notes
2.01	1080i	16:9	ALLTV HD	ALLTV2	Commercial Broadcast

==== Analog ====
Branding	Callsign	Channel	Power	Type	Location (Transmitter Site)
ALLTV2 Manila	DZMV	2	50 kW	Originating	Diliman, Quezon City
ALLTV Baguio	DWAY	3	10 kW	Relay	Mt. Sto. Tomas, Tuba, Benguet
ALLTV Mt. Province	PA	11	5 kW	Relay	Mt. Amuyao, Mt. Province
ALLTV Ilocos Norte	PA	7	5 kW	Relay	Brgy. San Lorenzo, San Nicolas, Ilocos Norte
ALLTV Isabela	PA	2	1 kW	Relay	Maharlika Highway, Brgy. Victory Norte, Santiago, Isabela
ALLTV Zambales	PA	13	1 kW	Relay	Brgy. Binoclutan, Botolan, Zambales
ALLTV Batangas	DWAD	10	10 kW	Relay	Mt. Banoy, Batangas
ALLTV Puerto Princesa	DYPR	7	5 kW	Affiliate	Mabini cor. Valencia Streets, Brgy. Masipag, Puerto Princesa, Palawan
ALLTV Legazpi	PA	4	5 kW	Relay	Mt. Bariw, Estanza, Legazpi, Albay
ALLTV Naga	PA	11	10 kW	Relay	Panganiban Drive, Naga, Camarines Sur
ALLTV Iloilo	PA	10	10 kW	Relay	Brgy. Alaguisoc, Jordan, Guimaras
ALLTV Bacolod	DYAG	4	10 kW	Relay	Mt. Kanlandog, Murcia, Negros Occidental
ALLTV Dumaguete	PA	12	5 kW	Relay	Mt. Palinpinon, Valencia, Negros Oriental
ALLTV Cebu	DYAE	3	10 kW	Relay	Brgy. Babag 1, Mt. Busay, Cebu City
ALLTV Tacloban	PA	2	5 kW	Relay	Mt. Naga-Naga, Tacloban
ALLTV Zamboanga	PA	3	5 kW	Relay	San Jose Road, Zamboanga City
ALLTV Cagayan de Oro	DXAL	4	10 kW	Relay	Macapagal Drive, Brgy. Bulua, Cagayan de Oro
ALLTV Iligan	PA	4	5 kW	Relay	Elena Tower, Andres Bonifacio Ave. (Tibanga Highway), Iligan
ALLTV Bukidnon	PA	2	10 kW	Relay	Mt. Kitanglad, Bukidnon
ALLTV Davao	DXAK	4	10 kW	Relay	Broadcast Ave., Shrine Hills, Matina, Davao City
ALLTV General Santos	PA	3	5 kW	Relay	Brgy. City Heights, General Santos
ALLTV Cotabato	PA	5	5 kW	Relay	Brgy. Rosary Heights V, Cotabato City

ALLTV2 Manila conducted a test broadcast in Metro Manila from June 27 to September 12, 2022. The station began its broadcast through soft launch on September 13, 2022.

=== Cable ===
Site Name	Link
ALLTV2	Click to view

== See also ==
- ABS-CBN Corporation
