= Campus Radio Online =

- Metro Manila; Philippines

Programming
- Format: Top 40/CHR, OPM

History
- First air date: April 30, 1992
- Last air date: August 2008
- Former call signs: DWLS (1992–2007); DWRT-FM (2008)
- Former frequencies: 97.1 MHz (1992–2007); 99.5 MHz (2008)

Campus Radio Online was a Metro Manila Internet radio station created by former Campus Radio DJs John Hendrix and Milo Cavarlez ("The Triggerman"), in partnership with Pangasinan-based eRadioPortal powered by Bitstop Network Services. It featured a Top 40/CHR and OPM format.

The brand originally aired on DWLS-FM from 1992 to 2007 and briefly on DWRT-FM from.March–August 2008

== History ==
=== DWLS-FM (1992–2007) ===
The "Campus Radio" brand originally launched on GMA Network's owned-and-operated FM stations on January 6, 1992 following the network's repositioning as the Rainbow Satellite Network. Its flagship property 97.1 FM was reformatted as Campus Radio 97.1 WLS FM, adopting a Top 40 format aimed at teens and young adults. Standout programs included the long-running “Top 20 at 12”. a daily countdown hosted by Milo Cavarlez (The Triggerman), inspired by BBC Radio 1’s Official Chart Show, and “Campus Aircheck,” a pioneering on-air training ground for aspiring DJs.

In 1995, months after Mike Enriquez took over the leadership of GMA's radio division, Campus Radio shifted to a contemporary MOR format with the slogan "Forever!" Notable programs included Message Center, which featured non-greeting messages. By late 1999, the station returned to a Top 40 format. During the zenith of its success as a pop station, it used custom jingles produced by JAM Creative Productions that were originally made for Chicago-based WLS-AM. On February 14, 2007 the "Campus Radio" brand was dropped for DWLS as it rebranded to Barangay LS and reformatted as a contemporary MOR station. While initially retaning its existing on-air staff, they were abruptly dismissed on January 16, 2008.

Meanwhile, most of the provincial Campus Radio stations under GMA Network’s RGMA subsidiary remained active under the old brand as hot adult contemporary (“masa”) stations, until rebranding as Barangay FM on February 17, 2014, unifying all RGMA FM stations under one brand.

=== As Campus 99.5 (2008) ===
The Campus brand was revived within Metro Manila on March 23, 2008, as 99.5 Campus FM through Real Radio Network-owned DWRT-FM, led by the displaced Barangay LS 97.1 staff as well as DJ's carried over from 99.5's previous "Hit FM" identity. By May, it was renamed Campus 99.5, retaining the original Campus Radio ethos, format, and programs.

However, on August 14, 2008 at 4:00 PM, Campus 99.5 was abruptly discontinued due to management issues and weak sales. The station then switched to automated music, with only The BrewRats continuing until August 21. After a brief hiatus, 99.5 reverted to its previous identity, 99.5 RT, on September 1, 2008.

=== As an Internet station (2009–2012) ===
After several months off the air, Campus Radio made a comeback in March 2009, this time as an internet-based station under the auspices of former DJ's John Hendrix and Milo Cavarlez in partnership with eRadio Portal. Its official relaunch took place during the U.P. Fair at the University of the Philippines Diliman, marking its transition to digital broadcasting. However, the station became inactive by 2012 as both Cavarlez and Hendrix eventually ventured to Adult CHR stations in Metro Manila
