= Golden Broadcast Professionals =

Golden Broadcast Professionals, Inc. (GBP)
- Type: Statutory Corporation
- Industry: TV and radio network
- Founded: 1992
- Headquarters: GBPI Building, Campaner St., Zamboanga City, Philippines
- Key people: Eddie and Lolita Chua
- Website: http://www.gbpi-tv11.com.ph/

Golden Broadcast Professionals, Inc., is a broadcasting company based in Zamboanga City. It operates a radio and TV station affiliated with Quest Broadcasting and TV5 Network, Inc. The network was formerly affiliated with Intercontinental Broadcasting Corporation (DXZB-TV 13) and Radio Mindanao Network (DXBE-DTV CTV 31).

== History ==
The radio (DXEL-FM) and television station (DXGB-TV) were launched in August 1992 at its broadcasting hub located at Campaner St., Zamboanga City. The station originally affiliated with TV5 Network, Inc. (DXGB TV11) from November 1, 1992 – January 1, 1998, and 2004 to present. Its FM station, formerly known as 95.5 Gold FM, is an affiliate of Quest Broadcasting Inc., the network that brought Magic 89.9 in Manila and Killer Bee FM Stations to the Philippine airwaves, from May 1, 2000.

== Affiliations ==
- TV5 Network, Inc. (TV5) - November 1, 1992 – January 1, 1998; Mid-2004 to present
- Intercontinental Broadcasting Corporation (IBC 13) - November 1, 1998 to late 2005.
- BEAM (RMN) - April to October 1998 July 3, 2011 to September 1, 2014.
- One Sports - February 21, 2011 to present

== Programs ==
=== Current programs ===
- Dateline TeleRadyo (Morning Edition) - A three-hour television and radio news live programming, through GBPI TV11 and Magic 95.5 from 6 to 9 AM. Hosted by JV Francisco.
- Dateline TeleRadyo (Afternoon Edition) - A continuation for their morning block and simulcast as well through GBPI TV11 and Magic 95.5 from 6 to 9 AM. Hosted by JV Francisco and Noning Antonio.
- Dateline Zamboanga - the flagship Chavacano newscast anchored by Albert Luna.

=== Previous programs ===
- No Holds Barred - talkshow hosted by Ronnie Lledo (replacing "No Limit")
- BENG - talkshow program hosted by former Zamboanga City Mayor Maria Isabelle Climaco
- Dateline Zamboanga (English Broadcast) - Originally aired in English since 1993, it reformatted in local Chavacano language in 2001.
- Celso desde Limpapa hasta Licomo - Started in 1998, it aired during the first term as a Congressman of Cong. Celso Lobregat. The show ended when he was elected as the city mayor in 2004.
- 30 Minutes with Atty. Vic Solis - a 30-minute current affairs program by Atty. Vic Solis. It ended in 2008.
- S na S! - produced by Rikki Lim of Victory Studio, Zamboanga City
- Yahoo! - variety show hosted and produced by former City Councilor VP Elago
- Amor con Amor Se Paga - a public affairs programming hosted by the former Zamboanga City 2nd District Cong. Erbie Fabian. The show ended when Cong. Fabian ended his 3-year term as congressman.
- VEZ TV (Vale el Zamboanga) - local tele-magazine in cooperation with SkyCable Zamboanga. They transferred to EMedia Productions in early 2016.

Aside from these said programs and most of TV5's network programming, the station also airs blocktime movie programs as well as live telecast of local issues affecting Zamboanga.

== GBPI Radio stations ==
Branding	Callsign	Frequency	Power kW	Location
Magic 95.5 Zamboanga	DXEL	95.5 MHz	5 kW (20 kW ERP)	Zamboanga City

-Affiliated with Quest Broadcasting Inc.

== GBPI TV stations ==
=== Analog ===
Branding	Callsign	Ch. #	Power kW	Location
GBPI TV 11 Zamboanga	DXGB-TV	TV-11	5 kW (20 kW ERP)	Zamboanga City

=== Digital ===
Branding	Callsign	Ch.#	Frequency	Power kW	Location
GBPI TV 11 Zamboanga	DXGB-TV	51	695.143 (MHz)	5 kW (10 kW ERP)	Zamboanga City

-With several cable affiliates in Zamboanga Peninsula.

== One Sports stations ==
Branding	Callsign	Ch. #	Power kW	Location
One Sports Zamboanga	DXDE-TV	TV-29	5 kW (20 kW ERP)	Zamboanga City

== See also ==
- TV5 Network, Inc.
- MediaQuest Holdings
- Intercontinental Broadcasting Corporation
- List of television and radio stations in Zamboanga City
- Quest Broadcasting Inc.
- EMedia Productions
