= DXGB-TV =

- Zamboanga City; Philippines
- Channels: Analog: 11 (VHF); Digital: 51 (UHF) (ISDB-T); Virtual: 11.01
- Branding: GBPI TV-11 Zamboanga; TV5 Zamboanga (on TV5-related promos)

Programming
- Affiliations: 11.01: GBPI TV11; 11.02: TV5; 11.03: One Sports; 11.04: RPTV; 11.05: Voice of America

Ownership
- Owner: Golden Broadcast Professionals, Inc.
- Sister stations: DXDE-TV; DXEL

History
- Founded: March 17, 1992
- Former channel number: 5 (1960-1972)
- Former affiliations: ABC (1992-1998; 2004-2008); RMN/BEAM (E! Philippines/The Game Channel/CHASE/Jack City/BEAM TV) (April–October 1998; 2011-2014); IBC (November 1, 1998-2005)
- Call sign meaning: DX; Golden; Broadcasting Professionals

Technical information
- Licensing authority: NTC
- Power: Analog: 10 kW TPO; Digital:5 kW TPO
- ERP: Analog:20 kW ERP; Digital:10 kW ERP

Links
- Website: www.gbpi-tv11.com.ph www.tv5.com.ph

DXGB-TV (channel 11) is a television station in Zamboanga City, Philippines and the flagship television property of locally based Golden Broadcast Professionals, Inc., which owned the station since its inception. It is one of the two TV5-affiliated outlets in the Zamboanga Region, with channel 11 serving as local originating regional station; the second station is DTV UHF channel 18, owned by TV5's sister station Cignal TV and direct relay of TV5 Manila.

DXGB-TV is a sister station to One Sports affiliate DXDE-TV (channel 29), and radio station DXEL (95.5 MHz). The three stations share studios and transmitter facilities at the GBPI Bldg., Campaner Street, Zamboanga City.

== Background ==
With an authority from the NTC to use a 5-kilowatt transmitter granted on March 17, 1992, GBPI TV-11 operates using the city’s first solid-state BTSC stereo TV transmitter. A 4-bay panel TV antenna system coupled to a 260 ft. self-supporting broadcast tower blankets the entire Zamboanga Peninsula with a potential 20 kilowatts ERP signal.

Transmitting from the highest point at the center of downtown Zamboanga City, GBPI TV-11 has the best equipped ”Live-on-Air” studio, and has the capability for outside broadcast. This station is equipped with a 5-meter fiberglass TVRO system which can pull in any satellite signal within footprint view.

As an affiliate of TV5 Network Inc., GBPI TV11 carries most of TV5's national network programming, with local news and independent productions as breakaway from the Manila feed.

== Programming ==
=== Current Programs ===
- Dateline TeleRadyo - morning news and public service program, simulcasted on Magic 95.5 Zamboanga
- Dateline Zamboanga - the flagship Chavacano newscast patterned with News5's national newscast Frontline Pilipinas as they use the soundtrack of the former TV5 newscast Aksyon.

=== Previous aired programs ===
- No Holds Barred - a talk show hosted by Ronnie Lledo
- Beng
- Amor con Amor Se Paga
- 30 Minutes
- Celso desde Limpapa hasta Licomo
- No Limit - weekly talk show
- S na S!
- Yahoo!
- VEZ TV (Vale el Zamboanga)

== Digital television ==
=== Digital channels ===
DXGB-TV currently operates on UHF Channel 51 (695.143 MHz), and is multiplexed into the following subchannels:

Channel	Video	Aspect	Short name	Programming	Notes
11.1	1080i	16:9	GBPI TV11	Golden Broadcasting Professionals Inc. (Main DXGB-TV programming)	Commercial broadcast (5 kW)
11.2	1080i	16:9	TV5	TV5	Mirror feed from DTT-18
11.3	480i	16:9	One Sports	One Sports	Mirror feed from DTT-18
11.4	1080i	16:9	RPTV	RPTV	Mirror feed from DTT-18
11.5	1080i	16:9	VOA	Voice of America	Commercial broadcast (5 kW)
11.31	240p	16:9	GBPI TV11 1Seg	Golden Broadcasting Professionals Inc.	1Seg test broadcast

== Areas of coverage ==
=== Primary areas ===
- Zamboanga City
- Basilan

==== Secondary areas ====
- Portion of Zamboanga Sibugay
- Portion of Zamboanga del Norte

== See also ==
- TV5
- List of TV5 stations
- Magic 95.5 Zamboanga
- DXAX-DTV - TV5 digital affiated station in Zamboanga
- DWET-TV
- Golden Broadcast Professionals
