= Kapamilya Channel =

Philippine pay television network

- Type: Pay television channel
- Country: Philippines
- Network: ABS-CBN
- Affiliates: All TV (AMBS)
- Headquarters: ABS-CBN Broadcasting Center, Diliman, Quezon City, Metro Manila, Philippines

Programming
- Languages: Filipino (main); English (secondary)
- Picture format: 1080i HDTV (downscaled to 16:9 480i for the SDTV feed)

Ownership
- Owner: ABS-CBN Corporation
- Sister channels: A2Z (via ZOE TV); ANC; Cine Mo!; Cinema One; Favorite Music Radio (PCMC); 92.3 FM Radio Manila (via PCMC); Jeepney TV; Knowledge Channel; Metro Channel; Myx; DZMM Radyo Patrol 630 (via PCMC); DZMM TeleRadyo (via PCMC); TFC

History
- Launched: June 13, 2020; 6 years ago
- Replaced: ABS-CBN (2nd iteration, post-martial law, 1986–2020, pay-TV channel space)

Links
- Website: www.abs-cbn.com

Availability

Terrestrial
- See separate section

Kapamilya Channel (lit. 'Family member channel'; known on-air as ABS-CBN | Kapamilya Channel or ABS-CBN sa Kapamilya Channel), (Note: The ABS-CBN branding was initially shown at the channel's 2020–2026 silent break bumper during commercials from June 13, 2020 to March 16, 2026 as the 2013 ABS-CBN symbol just before the Kapamilya Channel logo that finishes the bumper upon it zooms in, before the horizontal version of the 2013 logo is used from March 16, 2026.) is a 24-hour Philippine pay television channel owned and operated by ABS-CBN Corporation, a subsidiary of Lopez Holdings Corporation. Its headquarters is located at the ABS-CBN Broadcasting Center in Quezon City and serves as the flagship television channel under the ABS-CBN media brand.

Kapamilya Channel launched on June 13, 2020, replacing the free-to-air ABS-CBN after its broadcast franchise expired on May 4, 2020 and shutdown on May 5, 2020, and the denial on July 10, 2020. The channel airs a mix of ABS-CBN programs, including those that aired before and after its launch.

== Overview ==
Kapamilya Channel is available through most cable providers affiliated with the Philippine Cable and Telecommunications Association (PCTA), including ABS-CBN's Sky Cable, Converge ICT's Vision, and Streamtech's Planet Cable. It is also accessible via direct broadcast satellite television service providers such as Sky Direct (until June 30, 2020, under Sky Cable due to franchise expiration; following Converge and Reliance Broadcasting Unlimited's acquisition and subsequent reactivation of Sky Direct, it eventually returned to its line-up in 2025), G Sat, and, since October 21, 2020, through Cignal and SatLite. Since April 15, 2024, Kapamilya Channel is also being carried by free-to-air television network AllTV2 initially through a content partnership (later brand licensing) agreement with Advanced Media Broadcasting System. Since March 16, 2026, the 2013 ABS-CBN logo was added on the channel's branding coinciding with the rebranding of its free-to-air simulcast on ALLTV2.

ABS-CBN Corporation continued to produce and distribute content during the congressional deliberations on its franchise renewal application. The cease-and-desist order issued by the National Telecommunications Commission applied specifically to ABS-CBN's free-to-air television and radio stations. On July 10, 2020, the House of Representatives voted 70–11 against renewing the franchise application.

The network streams live content and makes most of its shows available on the streaming service iWantTFC. On August 1, 2020, the network launched the Kapamilya Online Live service, which livestreams some content from Kapamilya Channel and Jeepney TV on Facebook and YouTube. While the network is available only in the Philippines, most local programs are accessible via ABS-CBN's international subscription service, The Filipino Channel, through cable, satellite, internet, and IPTV.

Similar to the pre-pandemic free-to-air operations of the former ABS-CBN, Kapamilya Channel operates 24/7 on pay TV. During Holy Week in the Philippines, the channel pauses broadcasting from 12:00 am to 06:00 am (UTC +8) on Maundy Thursday, Good Friday and Black Saturday. While for its free-to-air simulcast on All TV, it operates daily Mondays to Fridays from 5:30 am to 11:15 pm (PST), Saturdays from 5:30 am to 12:00 am of the next day (PST), and Sundays from 6:00 am to 12:45 am of the next day (PST). The Three O'Clock Prayer (Filipino: Panalangin sa Ikatlo ng Hapon) is also shown during afternoon time slots.

On March 16, 2026, the channel started to adapt the "ABS-CBN | Kapamilya Channel" or "ABS-CBN Kapamilya Channel" branding where the network's 2013 logo is now used together with the Kapamilya Channel logo. This also happened to Kapamilya Online Live. As such, its silent break bumper during commercials was changed where it has different animations and visuals from its previous 2020–2026 one from June 13, 2020, to March 16, 2026. This marked the first time where Kapamilya Channel changed its silent bumper, and the fifth bumper on ABS-CBN's main channel overall after the 1987, 2005 and 2014 bumpers on the main ABS-CBN terrestrial channel and 2020 Kapamilya Channel from March 1987, October 2005, February 2014, and June 2020, respectively.

== Availability ==
=== Terrestrial ===
- ABS-CBN sa ALLTV2
  - Metro Manila: Channel 2 (analog) and Channel 16 (digital)
  - Regional: Varies per location

=== Satellite ===
- Sky Direct (Nationwide): Channel 15
- Cignal (Nationwide): Channel 22 (SD) and Channel 257 (HD)
- SatLite (Nationwide): Channel 22
- G Sat (Nationwide): Channel 12

=== Cable ===
- Sky Cable (Metro Manila): Channel 8 (SD) and Channel 167 (HD)
- Cablelink (Metro Manila, Bulacan, Tarlac, Cavite, Laguna): Channel 8

=== IPTV ===
- Converge Vision / SkyTV (Metro Manila): Channel 15 (HD)

=== Online ===
- iWant (Philippines): Watch live

== Programming ==
Kapamilya Channel features programming that previously aired or was scheduled to air on ABS-CBN before the suspension of its operations, which followed the implementation of the enhanced community quarantine in Luzon and the issuance of a cease and desist order. Programs included the noontime variety shows It's Showtime and ASAP XP, the morning talk show Magandang Buhay, and drama series such as FPJ's Ang Probinsyano, Love Thy Woman, and A Soldier's Heart. Two original public service programs, Paano Kita Mapasasalamatan? hosted by Judy Ann Santos, and Iba 'Yan hosted by Angel Locsin, premiered on Kapamilya Channel and concluded in 2021.

Initially, TV Patrol and other news and current affairs programs were not broadcast on Kapamilya Channel, despite earlier reports. Until July 24, 2020, TV Patrol was available only on TeleRadyo (now as DZMM TeleRadyo), ANC, and Cine Mo!, and through online streaming on the ABS-CBN News Facebook page and YouTube channel. On July 27, 2020, The World Tonight, ANC's late-night English newscast, began airing on Kapamilya Channel, marking the first time since 1999 that both TV Patrol and The World Tonight were broadcast on the same channel.

On August 17, 2020, Ang sa Iyo ay Akin premiered as the first original drama series broadcast on Kapamilya Channel and Kapamilya Online Live during the COVID-19 pandemic. Some scenes were recorded at the Horizon IT Park in Bulacan.

On October 10, 2020, ABS-CBN programs began broadcasting on A2Z Channel 11, a free-to-air television channel partnership between ABS-CBN and ZOE Broadcasting Network under an airtime lease.

On October 21, 2020, Kapamilya Channel became available on Cignal, a direct-to-home satellite TV service owned by MediaQuest Holdings, to increase its viewership. On January 24, 2021, selected Kapamilya Channel programs began simulcasting on TV5, as part of an agreement between ABS-CBN Corporation, TV5 Network Inc., and Cignal TV.

On March 18, 2021, ABS-CBN announced a partnership with WeTV and iflix to stream ABS-CBN's prime-time programs on these platforms starting March 20, two days before their free-to-air broadcast, with early access for subscribed users.

In the following years, ABS-CBN partnered with several networks to air programs broadcast by Kapamilya Channel. GMA Network Inc. collaborated with ABS-CBN Corporation for the simulcast of It's Showtime on GMA and GTV, as well as Pinoy Big Brother starting in 2025.

Advanced Media Broadcasting System (AMBS) entered into an content partnership (later brand licensing from December 17, 2025) agreement with ABS-CBN Corporation to air the Kapamilya Channel broadcast feed on All TV to be known as Kapamilya Channel sa All TV, ABS-CBN sa All TV, or ABS-CBN | ALLTV alongside some Jeepney TV programs under Jeepney TV sa All TV block starting April 15, 2024. The comedy gag show Goin' Bulilit returned with a new cast and is also simulcast on All TV. The channel then extended its airtime on January 2, 2026 that replaced Jeepney TV with the whole channel now being the same as the main cable channel and another free TV channel A2Z if connected to the former counterparts albeit with its own silent break bumper that take the place of the Kapamilya Channel one (which was used on All TV from April 15, 2024 until January 1, 2026 on All TV and continued to be used on the Kapamilya Channel itself even after its All TV's airtime extension until March 16, 2026) but limited broadcast hours for All TV (airing around 18 hours a day). The extension followed TV5 Network's decision to make airing newly produced ABS-CBN contents on TV5 went on hiatus temporarily until June 22, 2026 due to financial disputes involving blocktime fees which was subsequently settled while retaining reruns of the latter's shows (Nag-aapoy Na Damdamin and Pira-Pirasong Paraiso) on the network. The first programming to be aired on All TV are Umaganda, Kapamilya Gold, and post-TV Patrol Primetime Bida timeslot blocks, followed by the rest of Yes Weekend! from January 3 to 4, 2026.

Online streaming on Kapamilya Channel's official website and Kapamilya Online Live, excluding iWant (formerly iWantTFC), does not include acquired programming (including Miss Universe of the year), Viu Original content, movie blocks (including foreign movies), and overnight programming. Livestreaming focuses primarily on local programming due to copyright restrictions.

== Kapamilya Online Live ==
Kapamilya Online Live
- Website type: Web-based channel
- Available in: Filipino (main); English (secondary)
- Headquarters: ABS-CBN Broadcasting Center, Sgt. Esguerra Avenue corner Mother Ignacia Street, Diliman, Quezon City, Metro Manila, Philippines
- Country of origin: Philippines
- Area served: Philippines (Nationwide); Asia; Europe; Australia; New Zealand; Latin America; Americas; Africa
- Owner: ABS-CBN Corporation
- Key people: Martin "Mark" L. López (Chairman); Carlo L. Katigbak (President and CEO); Cory Vidanes (COO for Broadcast); Jaime Lopez (Head of ABS-CBN Digital Media)
- Parent: ABS-CBN Digital Media
- Website: youtube.com/abscbnentertainment/live youtube.com/@iWant/live (November 29 – December 1, 2025; interim, due to hacking of ABS-CBN's main YouTube channel)
- Advertising: Yes
- Registration: Required
- Launched: August 1, 2020; 6 years ago
- Current status: Active

Known on-air as ABS-CBN | Kapamilya Online Live and ABS-CBN sa Kapamilya Online Live since March 16, 2026, launched on August 1, 2020, livestreaming on Facebook and YouTube. On Facebook, shows are streamed in regular time slots, with scheduled breaks. On YouTube, it streams throughout the day from 06:00 to 00:00 (except during special events) and has streamed 24/7 since May 6, 2024. Live streaming has been available exclusively in the Philippines since August 1, 2020; in Japan, Hong Kong, and Singapore since June 19, 2023; in South Korea, Malaysia, Taiwan, Thailand, Macau, Vietnam, China, and Indonesia since July 17, 2023; in Europe, Australia, Papua New Guinea, New Zealand, Israel, and other locations in Asia since September 25, 2023; and in Canada since December 1, 2023. Kapamilya Online Live streams a variety of ABS-CBN's classic shows, including those from Jeepney TV, and other exclusive online content.

On August 1, 2021, Kapamilya Online Live became accessible worldwide, streaming classic series on weekdays and Star Cinema movies and specials during weekend midnight programming. Kapamilya Online Live Global streams in the Middle East, Africa, Guam, Hawaii, Canada, United States, and several locations in South America. It streamed in Northeast Asia and Southeast Asia from August 1, 2021, until June 19, 2023, and until July 17, 2023, in South Korea, Malaysia, Taiwan, Thailand, Macau, Vietnam, China, and Indonesia, and until September 24, 2023, in Europe, Australia, New Zealand, and additional locations in Asia. It streamed daily from 12:00 a.m. to 8:00 a.m. in Thailand, Malaysia, South Korea, Taiwan, Vietnam, Mongolia, China, Indonesia, and Macau only. Kapamilya Online Live is available in the Philippines, Asia, Australia, Europe, and New Zealand; the word "Global" was dropped in April 2024.

Similar to its cable counterpart and All TV since January 2, 2026, it also air the Three O' Clock Prayer.

=== Streams ===
On February 23, 2021, Kapamilya Online Live began offering a video on demand service, making programming accessible for twenty one days (formerly seven) after its original streaming date.

== See also ==
- ABS-CBN
