= DWDD-AM =

Radio station in Metro Manila, Philippines

AFP Radio (DWDD)
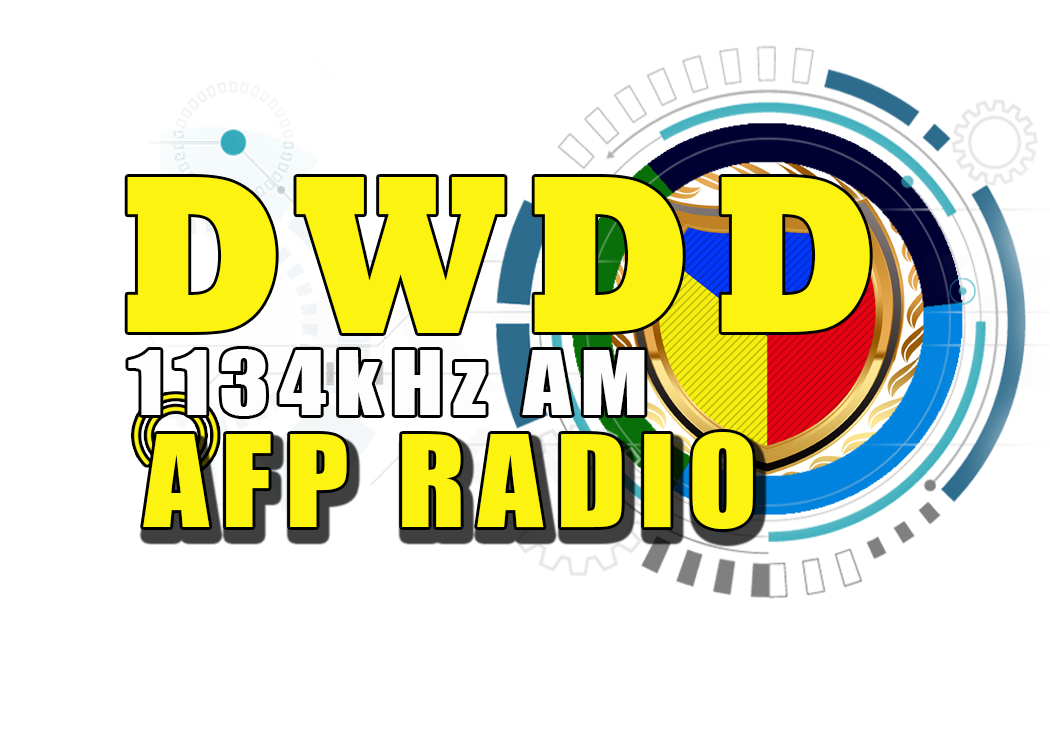
- Quezon City; Philippines
- Broadcast area: Metro Manila and surrounding areas
- Frequency: 1134 kHz
- Branding: AFP Radio 1134

Programming
- Languages: Filipino, English
- Format: News, Public Affairs, Talk

Ownership
- Owner: Department of National Defense and Armed Forces of the Philippines

History
- First air date: September 1, 1986
- Former call signs: DZAF (1986–1987)
- Call sign meaning: Department of National Defense

Technical information
- Power: 10,000 watts

Links
- Webcast: DWDD 1134 on Ustream
- Website: Website

DWDD (1134 AM) AFP Radio is a radio station owned and operated by the Department of National Defense and Armed Forces of the Philippines through its Civil Relations Service. Its radio transmitter and studios are located at PVAO Building, Camp Aguinaldo, EDSA, Quezon City. This is the radio station usually being listened to during emergencies like natural disasters.

== History ==
=== 1986-1987: DZAF ===
DWDD was established on July 10, 1986, as DZAF under the Ministry Order Number a-092. It began broadcasting on September 1, 1986, with 10 kW power from the Top Floor of the former 6th Brigade Headquarters. Despite its success, in August 1987, DZAF ceased its operations due to the exploitation by certain sectors in the military.

=== 1988-present: DWDD ===
The station revived on January 4, 1988, under the call sign DWDD "Ang Kabalikat Radyo" with a meager 1 kW power. On August 1, 1991, it was placed under the operational control of the Office of the Deputy Chief of Staff for Civil Military Operations, J7, Armed Forces of the Philippines. On July 1, 1994, Civil Relations Service, AFP took over the administrative and operational control of the station, months after DZCA closed shop.

Following the donation of 5 units 10 kW AM Radio transmitters from the Taiwan Ministry of National Defence in April 1993, DWDD was able to operate with a 10-kW power upon the successful installation of one of the main transmitting equipment.

Around October 2009, it ceased its operations again to upgrade its transmission facilities. In January 2010, it was launched once again.

In 2014, DWDD started carrying the Ka-Tropa Radio branding and later in 2020 was rebranded AFP Radio.

DWDD supports national goals and helps accomplish DND and AFP missions by serving as an effective medium of information for its military and civilian personnel and the general public, not just thru radio, but also on social media, with livestreams on its official FB page and YouTube channel.
