= DYII =

Bee 92.7 (DYII)
Tagbilaran; Philippines
- Broadcast area: Bohol, parts of Cebu
- Frequency: 92.7 MHz
- Branding: Bee 92.7

Programming
- Languages: English (primary); Cebuano (talk programs)
- Format: Top 40 (CHR), OPM, Talk

Ownership
- Owner: Vimcontu Broadcasting Corporation
- Operator: Groove Deejayz Entertainment Solutions

History
- First air date: February 8, 2016
- Former names: Magic (February 8, 2016–September 6, 2018)
- Call sign meaning: Roman numeral representation of 2

Technical information
- Licensing authority: NTC
- Class: A, B, C
- Power: 5,000 watts
- ERP: 10,000 watts
- HAAT: 847 ft (258.1656 meter)

Links
- Webcast: Listen Live

DYII (92.7 FM), broadcasting as Bee 92.7, is a radio station owned by Vimcontu Broadcasting Corporation and operated by Groove Deejayz Entertainment Solutions. The station's studio and transmitter are located along Cecilio Putong St. (formerly Maria Clara St.), Tagbilaran.

The station was launched on February 8, 2016 as Magic 92.7 under an affiliation of Quest Broadcasting, Inc.. It was later relaunched under its current brand on September 7, 2018.
