= DXKB =

Radio station in Cagayan de Oro, Philippines

K5 News FM Cagayan de Oro (DXKB)
Cagayan de Oro; Philippines
- Broadcast area: Misamis Oriental, Northern Bukidnon and surrounding areas
- Frequency: 89.3 MHz
- Branding: 89.3 K5 News FM

Programming
- Languages: Cebuano, Filipino
- Format: Contemporary MOR, News, Talk
- Network: K5 News FM
- Affiliations: Abante; Bilyonaryo News Channel

Ownership
- Owner: Quest Broadcasting Inc.
- Operator: 5K Broadcasting Network

History
- First air date: February 1, 1994
- Former names: Killerbee (February 1994–March 2013); Magic (May 2013–April 2023); Radyo Bandera Sweet FM (May-November 2023)
- Call sign meaning: Killerbee (former branding)

Technical information
- Licensing authority: NTC
- Power: 10,000 watts
- ERP: 30,000 watts

DXKB (89.3 FM), broadcasting as 89.3 K5 News FM, is a radio station owned by Quest Broadcasting Inc. and operated by 5K Broadcasting Network. Its studio and transmitter are located at the 10th Floor, One Providence Bldg., Lifestyle District, Corrales Ext., Cagayan de Oro.

== History ==
Magic (2013–2023)

The station was formerly known as Killerbee 89.3 from its inception in 1994 until March 27, 2013. This station, along with the other Killerbee stations, were relaunched under the Magic moniker (adopted from its then-parent station) by April 29, 2013. During its existence, it was located at MAM Bldg. along Abellanosa St.

On April 20, 2023, Magic 89.3 went off the air. It was at this time when 5K Broadcasting Network took over the station's operations. It was officially launched in May 1 under the Radyo Bandera Sweet FM network, which became K5 News FM on December 1.
