= DWVA =

Voice of America (DWVA)
Relay of Voice of America

San Fernando; Philippines
- Broadcast area: La Union and surrounding areas
- Frequency: 1170 kHz
- Branding: Voice of America

Programming
- Format: Silent

Ownership
- Owner: Voice of America

History
- First air date: June 1953
- Last air date: March 14, 2025
- Former frequencies: 1140 kHz (1953–1979)
- Call sign meaning: Voice of America

Technical information
- Licensing authority: NTC
- Power: 10,000 watts

Links
- Webcast: https://www.voanews.com/

DWVA (1170 AM) was a relay station of the Voice of America. The station's transmitter facilities were located in the Poro Point Freepoint Zone, Brgy. Poro, San Fernando, La Union. It went off the air on March 14, 2025.
