= Rio Grande Valley Killer Bees =

Rio Grande Valley Killer Bees may refer to:

- Rio Grande Valley Killer Bees (CHL), defunct professional ice hockey team that played in the Central Hockey League
- Rio Grande Valley Killer Bees (NAHL), defunct junior ice hockey team that played in the North American Hockey League
- Rio Grande Valley Killer Bees (USACHL), defunct junior ice hockey team that played in the USA Central Hockey League
