= All TV =

Philippine free-to-air television network

- Current logo since November 2024; as part of brand licensing agreement, 2013 ABS-CBN logo was added as ident in March 2026.
- Type: Free-to-air television network
- Country: Philippines
- Broadcast area: Nationwide; Worldwide (via TFC)
- Network: ABS-CBN (2024–present)
- Stations: List of All TV stations
- Affiliates: Kapamilya Channel (2026–present); Jeepney TV (2024–2026)
- Headquarters: For ABS-CBN: ABS-CBN Broadcasting Center, Sgt. Esguerra Avenue cor. Mother Ignacia St., Diliman, Quezon City; For AMBS: Worldwide Corporate Center, Shaw Boulevard, Mandaluyong City

Programming
- Languages: Filipino (main); English (secondary)
- Picture format: 1080i HDTV (downscaled to 16:9 480i for the SDTV feed)

Ownership
- Owner: ABS-CBN Corporation (Master Control, Broadcast Feed, or Content Scheduling); Advanced Media Broadcasting System (Broadcast Spectrum and License)
- Parent: Streamtech (Villar Group)
- Sister channels: Under AMBS/All TV; All Radio 103.5; Under ABS-CBN; A2Z (via ZOE TV); Knowledge Channel; Jeepney TV; DZMM TeleRadyo; DZMM Radyo Patrol 630; 92.3 FM Radio Manila; Metro Channel; Cine Mo! Cinema One; ANC; Myx; TFC

History
- Launched: September 13, 2022; 4 years ago (soft launch); May 13, 2024; 2 years ago (official launch)
- Replaced: ABS-CBN (second iteration on VHF 2 Manila channel space, post-martial law); Shop TV (Sky Cable channel space)

Links
- Website: www.abs-cbn.com alltv.ph

Availability

Terrestrial
- See separate section

All TV (stylized as ALLTV, known on-air as ABS-CBN | ALLTV2 or ABS-CBN sa ALLTV2 (Note: Since February 2026; formerly as Kapamilya Channel sa ALLTV2 from April 15, 2024 to March 16, 2026.)) is a Philippine free-to-air broadcast television network serving as the flagship property of Advanced Media Broadcasting System (AMBS), together with ABS-CBN Corporation serving as its main content provider through a brand licensing agreement. All TV's main broadcast facilities and studios originated at ABS-CBN Broadcasting Center, Sgt. Esguerra Avenue cor. Mother Ignacia St., Diliman, Quezon City, while its alternate broadcast facilities are located at Worldwide Corporate Center, Shaw Boulevard, Mandaluyong. The transmitter is located at Diliman, Quezon City.

The flagship television station for All TV is DZMV-TV, which carries VHF Channel 2 (analog broadcast) and UHF Channel 16 (digital broadcast). In addition to DZMV-TV, the network also operates sixteen provincial analog television stations and twelve digital television stations in the Philippines; both Channel 2 Manila and regional stations that were previously used by ABS-CBN until its broadcast franchise expired in 2020. All TV operates Weekdays from 5:30 to 23:15 (PST), Saturdays from 5:30 to 0:00 (PST) and Sundays from 6:00 to 0:45 of the next day (PST).

== History ==
=== 2019–2024: Soft launch ===
In 2019, Advanced Media Broadcasting System (AMBS) was granted a 25-year legislative franchise extension under Republic Act No. 11253 albeit without President Rodrigo Duterte's signature as the bill lapsed into law after 30 days of inaction. The Vera family and AMBS president Andrew Santiago sold AMBS to Planet Cable of real estate magnate and businessman-politician Manny Villar.

On January 5, 2022, the National Telecommunications Commission (NTC), under the leadership of Gamaliel Cordoba, awarded the frequencies of VHF analog channel 2 and digital channel 16 to AMBS. Furthermore, the channel 2 allocation was given a provisional authority to operate for 18 months until the analog shut-off of the country scheduled in 2023. These channels were previously used by ABS-CBN under the callsign DWWX-TV. ABS-CBN was shut down due to the cease and desist order by the National Telecommunications Commission and Solicitor General Jose Calida on May 5, 2020, and the Congress has denied the renewal of its broadcast franchise on July 10, 2020.

Logo used from June to September 2022, still used as their company logo.

AMBS Manila began its test broadcast on June 27, 2022. TV host Willie Revillame announced on September 1 that the TV station of AMBS would name as All TV (aligning with Villar's retail businesses). Initially slated for an October 1 debut, the station made its soft launch on September 13, 2022, at 12 noon, with plans of expanding it nationwide at the soonest possible time, as announced by Revillame. At the onset of All TV's soft launch, it initially ran an afternoon to late-night schedule from 2:30 to 11:00 pm (PHT) before expanding to a twelve hour schedule by February 2023.

Logo used from 2022 to 2023

During his contract signing with AMBS on July 15, 2022, Willie Revillame announced that his variety show Wowowin would air on All TV after its final broadcast on GMA Network on February 11. Weeks after, other personalities who signed their contracts with AMBS include actress and TV host Toni Gonzaga and her husband and director Paul Soriano, DZRH broadcaster and former ABS-CBN News anchor Anthony Taberna, singer and actress Ciara Sotto, and TV host Mariel Rodriguez. Gonzaga's special interview with President Bongbong Marcos inside the Malacañang Palace was aired on All TV, the same day the network was soft-launched.

Logo used from 2023 to 2024

Logo used from May to November 2024 and again on October 2026

AMBS also signed their partnership with CNN Philippines for the simultaneous airing of Filipino newscast News Night, which lasted until April 5, 2023. River Where the Moon Rises, Again My Life and From Now On, Showtime! were the first three Korean dramas that aired on All TV.

=== Since 2024: Return of ABS-CBN to former frequency ===
On April 15, 2024, AMBS entered into a content partnership (later brand licensing the following year from December 17, 2025) agreement with ABS-CBN Corporation to broadcast the latter's cable channel Jeepney TV under Jeepney TV sa All TV block, as well as the broadcast feed of Kapamilya Channel that will be known as Kapamilya Channel sa ALLTV2, ABS-CBN sa ALLTV2, or ABS-CBN | ALLTV2 (sharing content with its fellow affiliate ZOE Broadcasting Network's A2Z and brands were originally shown separately until January 1, 2026 with ALLTV2 as channel name and Kapamilya Channel for its 2020–2026 silent break bumper (which continued to be used until March 16, 2026) during commercials of the latter). All TV also involved in the co-production of the ninth season of Goin' Bulilit along with ABS-CBN Studios. Prior to the content partnership, the station has aired selected ABS-CBN drama series since its launch in 2022 through syndication. By this point, All TV had further expanded its broadcast to 16 hours daily from 07:30 to 11:15 pm and modified its station logo as ALLTV2 in November 2024 to reflect the network's flagship station.

On January 2, 2026, Kapamilya Channel extended its airtime on ALLTV, replacing its Jeepney TV simulcast; with the whole channel now being the same as the main cable and another free TV channel A2Z if connected to the former counterparts albeit with its own silent bumper that take the place of the cable one and limited broadcast hours (whereas Kapamilya Channel broadcasts 24 hours a day). The extension followed after TV5 Network went 5 months and 21 days of hiatus of airing newly-released ABS-CBN contents on TV5 that lasted until June 22, 2026 due to financial disputes involving blocktime fees which were subsequently settled while retaining reruns of the former's co-productions with the latter (Nag-aapoy Na Damdamin and Pira-Pirasong Paraiso) throughout 2026.

The first programming to be aired under the airtime extension is the Umaganda, Kapamilya Gold, and post-TV Patrol Primetime Bida timeslot blocks, followed by the rest of Yes Weekend!. The programming in All TV briefly included selected airtime of the cable channel's overnight Movie Central Presents block, prompting the station to extend broadcasting until 2:00AM, until quietly phased out on February 16.

On late February 2026, the ABS-CBN sa ALLTV2 name began to be adapted on-air through promoting its programs using the 2013 ABS-CBN logo, last seen before the May 2020 broadcast stoppage. It was then later used as an on-screen bug on March 16 coinciding with the revamp of its Primetime Bida block except What Lies Beneath, with the 2013 logo also being rolled out on its cable channel and livestreaming counterparts. As such, the channel's silent bumper during commercials was changed for the third time, after the 2020–2026 Kapamilya Channel from April 15, 2024 to January 1, 2026 (with it continued to be used on the said cable channel until March 16, 2026) and Kapamilya Channel sa ALLTV2 that was only used for 3 months from the latter's extension on January 2 to March 16, 2026.

All TV's Metro Manila affiliate, DZMV-TV, will shut down its analog signal on January 15, 2027, (originally on October 30, 2026, based on an announcement posted on September 1, 2026, but has been delayed to the official target date).

== Programming ==
On February 6, 2023, All TV's original programs have been cancelled.

Since April 15, 2024, as a part of a brand-licensing agreement between AMBS and ABS-CBN, All TV airs the Kapamilya Channel broadcast feed that was later extended on January 2, 2026.

=== Daily Schedule ===
Site Name	Link
ALLTV2	Click to view

== Broadcast stations ==
All TV operates its local owned and operated or affiliate television stations across twenty-seven key areas in the Philippines, including its flagship DZMV-TV (ALLTV2 Manila). The network has twenty-five owned and operated relay stations and one affiliate relay station in Puerto Princesa City in Palawan.

== Availability ==
=== Terrestrial ===
- Digital (Nationwide): Listings may vary
- Analog (Nationwide): Listings may vary

=== Satellite ===
- Sky Direct (Nationwide): Channel 2
- Cignal (Nationwide): Channel 16
- SatLite (Nationwide): Channel 16
- G Sat (Nationwide): Channel 2

=== Cable ===
- Sky Cable (Metro Manila): Channel 13
- Cablelink (Metro Manila, Bulacan, Tarlac, Cavite, Laguna): Channel 2
- Planet Cable (Metro Manila): Channel 2

=== IPTV ===
- Converge Vision / SkyTV (Metro Manila): Channel 4

== Free-to-air broadcast stations ==
Callsign	TV	Type	Transmitter location
DZMV	2 (analog); 16 (digital)	Originating	Quezon City
DWAY	3 (analog); 30 (digital)	Relay	Mt. Santo Tomas, Benguet
—N/a	11 (analog)	Relay	Mt. Amuyao, Mountain Province
—N/a	7 (analog); 16 (Note: on Test Broadcast) (digital)	Relay	San Nicolas, Ilocos Norte
—N/a	2 (analog); 16 (digital)	Relay	Santiago, Isabela
DWAP	34 (digital)	Relay	San Fernando, Pampanga
DWAL	34 (digital)	Relay	Tarlac City
DWAU	34 (digital)	Relay	San Miguel, Bulacan
—N/a	13 (analog)	Relay	Botolan, Zambales
DWAD	10 (analog); 46 (digital)	Relay	Mt. Banoy, Batangas
DWAV	46 (digital)	Relay	San Pablo, Laguna
—N/a	16 (digital)	Relay	Jalajala, Rizal
DYPR	7 (analog)	Affiliate (Note: Owned by Palawan Broadcasting Corporation)	Puerto Princesa
PA	4 (analog)	Relay	Legazpi, Albay
DWPV	11 (analog)	Relay	Naga, Camarines Sur
PA	10 (analog); 16 (digital)	Relay	Jordan, Guimaras
DYAG	4 (analog); 16 (digital)	Relay	Bacolod
PA	12 (analog)	Relay	Valencia, Negros Oriental
DYAE	3 (analog); 16 (digital)	Relay	Cebu City
PA	2 (analog)	Relay	Tacloban
PA	3 (analog)	Relay	Zamboanga City
DXAL	4 (analog); 16 (digital)	Relay	Cagayan de Oro
—N/a	4 (analog)	Relay	Iligan
—N/a	2 (analog)	Relay	Mt. Kitanglad, Bukidnon
DXAK	4 (analog); 16 (digital)	Relay	Davao City
PA	3 (analog)	Relay	General Santos
PA	5 (analog)	Relay	Cotabato City

== See also ==
- ABS-CBN Corporation
- A2Z
- ABS-CBN
- Advanced Media Broadcasting System
- DZMV-TV
- Kapamilya Channel
