= DZCA =

Quezon City; Philippines
- Broadcast area: Metro Manila and surrounding areas
- Frequency: 1170 kHz
- Branding: DZCA 1170

Programming
- Format: Silent

Ownership
- Owner: Office of Civil Defense

History
- First air date: 1960; 66 years ago
- Last air date: 1994; 32 years ago
- Former frequencies: 830 kHz (1960-1978)
- Call sign meaning: Civil Arms

Technical information
- Licensing authority: NTC

DZCA (1170 AM) was a radio station owned and operated by the Office of Civil Defense. Despite being inactive, the frequency receives live broadcast of Voice of America via DWVA in La Union.

It served as the official radio station of the Philippine Atmospheric Geophysical and Astronomical Services Administration (PAGASA), wherein it aired the latest weather information in the country at the top of the hour.

The station went off the air in 1994 due to lack of funding. In 2008, the Philippine National Police had plans to revive the frequency for effective communication in public, on-time reports, traffic updates and PAGASA weather updates. This never came to fruition.
