= DXKM (General Santos) =

Radio station in General Santos, Philippines

- General Santos; Philippines
- Broadcast area: South Cotabato, Sarangani and surrounding areas
- Frequency: 106.3 MHz

Programming
- Format: Silent

Ownership
- Owner: Advanced Media Broadcasting System

History
- First air date: August 1991
- Last air date: January 2023
- Former names: Killerbee (August 1991-April 2013); Magic (April 2013-January 2023)

Technical information
- Licensing authority: NTC

DXKM (106.3 FM) was a radio station owned and operated by Advanced Media Broadcasting System in General Santos, Philippines.

The station was formerly known as Killerbee 106.3 from August 1991 to April 2013. Along with the other Killerbee stations, it was relaunched under the Magic moniker (adopted from its parent station) by April 29, 2013. It went off the air in early 2023.
