= Streamtech =

Telecommunications company in the Philippines

Streamtech Systems Technologies, Inc. (Streamtech)
- Type: Private
- Industry: Telecommunications
- Predecessor: Planet Cable
- Founded: September 1, 2000
- Founder: Manuel "Paolo" A. Villar III
- Headquarters: Bacoor, Cavite, Philippines
- Area served: Cavite; Laguna; Rizal; Ilocos Norte; Bulacan
- Services: Cable television, Fiber broadband internet
- Owner: Prime Asset Ventures, Inc.
- Parent: Villar Group of Companies
- Subsidiaries: Advanced Media Broadcasting System; Planet Cable
- Website: streamtech.com.ph

Streamtech Systems Technologies, Inc. is a Philippine telecommunications company. Founded by Manuel Paolo A. Villar (son of real estate magnate and politician Manuel Villar Jr.), it offers communication services such as fiber to the home, internet and cable television bundles (through Planet Cable) and internet for small businesses and large enterprises.

== History ==
=== Early years ===
Planet Cable was founded in 2000 by Manuel Villar, Jr. It began its cable TV services in Cavite and Laguna.

=== Congressional franchise, formal launch ===
Paolo Villar founded the company in 2017. The following year in 2018, it obtained its 25-year Congressional franchise to operate telecommunication system under Republic Act No. 11089.

It was also interested to bid for the country's third major telecommunications provider, but were backed out after internal discussions.

In 2020, the Villar Group formally launched the fixed-line broadband internet business of Streamtech, including a peering partnership with Tier 1 for its global upstream services. The company also completed its acquisition of Planet Cable.

In 2021, Planet Cable acquired Advanced Media Broadcasting System, the company operating the radio station AllRadio 103.5 and TV network ALLTV from the Vera family.

== See also ==
- Telecommunications in the Philippines
- Vista Land
- Vista Malls
