= DWJM =

Radio station in Metro Manila, Philippines

Jam 88.3 (DWJM)
- Logo since 2026
- Mandaluyong; Philippines
- Broadcast area: Mega Manila and surrounding areas
- Frequency: 88.3 MHz
- RDS: JAM 88.3
- Branding: Jam 88.3

Programming
- Language: English
- Format: Modern rock
- Affiliations: Tiger 22 Media Corporation

Ownership
- Owner: Raven Broadcasting Corporation

History
- First air date: July 26, 1986
- Former call signs: DWFR-FM (1986–1988); DWCT-FM (1988–2003)
- Former names: Citylite (1986-2003)
- Call sign meaning: Jam

Technical information
- Licensing authority: NTC
- Power: 25,000 watts
- ERP: 62,500 watts

Links
- Webcast: Listen / Watch Live on Twitch

DWJM (88.3 FM), broadcasting as Jam 88.3, is a radio station owned and operated by Raven Broadcasting Corporation, one of the partner stations of Tiger 22 Media. The station's studio is located at Unit 906-B Paragon Plaza, EDSA cor. Reliance St., Mandaluyong, while its transmitter is located at Palos Verdes Executive Village, Sumulong Highway, Brgy. Sta. Cruz, Antipolo.

== History ==
=== 1986-2003: Citylite ===
Final Logo from 1998 to June 30, 2003

On July 26, 1986, the station was inaugurated as Citylite 88.3 with the call letters DWFR. It was owned by Francisco Ravina, along with 7 Board members at the launch of the station, namely Gerry Geronimo (host of Ating Alamin), Steve Salonga, Alex Limjuco, Kit Ravina, Francis Lumen, Bong Sierra and Mike Pedero, who was also the program director at the time.

Initially a Soft adult contemporary station, it played a smooth jazz track every hour. After several months, more jazz tracks were played than usual. In October 1988, it changed its call letters to DWCT, and became a fully fledged smooth jazz station, playing smooth jazz, contemporary pieces and rhythm and blues.

The station was initially manned by Pancho Alvarez, Pinky Aseron, Mike Taylor (Adam Kite), Ramon Cruz (Joey Pizza) and J. Zorrilla (Jlatin), with Eya Perdigon and Wickette handling the daily newscasts. It was also the official radio station of CNN and Asia Business News and was also affiliated with the American expats in the country. A few years later, 105.1 Crossover and Kiss Jazz 101.1 followed suit after the success of the station with the A and B crowd.

In October 1996, Citylite launched its live streaming on its website. After 2 years, Raven Broadcasting Corporation was acquired by the Vera family while Francis Lumen moved to Joey @ Rhythms 92.3. From March 2001 to June 2003, it was known as Smooth Jazz Citylite 88.3. On June 30, 2003, Citylite bid farewell with Eumir Deodato's "Love Island" as its swansong.

=== 2003–present: Jam ===
Logo from 2007 to 2011

On July 1, 2003, the station changed its call letters to DWJM and was relaunched as Jam 88.3 with a soft rock format to cater to a larger more advertiser-friendly audience. Ronaldo Sulit ("Joe D'Mango"), who was also responsible for managing sister station Wave 89.1, was the station manager until 2007, when he was replaced by Eric Perpetua. In 2005, it shifted to a modern adult contemporary format.

Logo from 2012 to 2014

In 2011, Jam gradually shifted to a modern rock format, after the demise of the two defunct rock stations NU 107 and UR 105.9. On September 11, 2012, it was relaunched as The New Jam, launching a few new programs, such as WRXP: Weekend Rock XPerience.

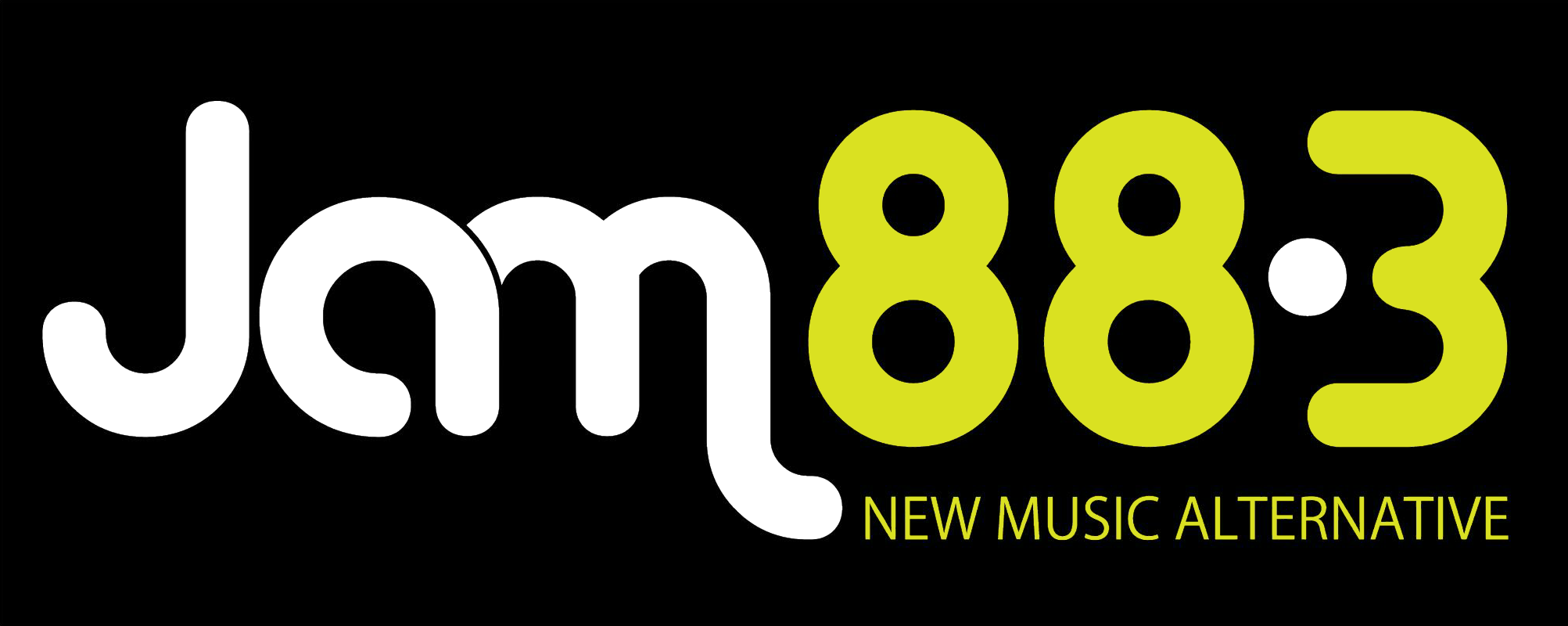
Logo from 2014 to 2023

In 2013, the station became the home of playing songs from local and unsigned Filipino independent artists/bands through its supplemental program Fresh Filter. Some indie acts became popular (and eventually rise into mainstream) such as Autotelic, Bullet Dumas, Yolanda Moon and others. The program ended in March 2017 and was replaced by Locals Only, a program similar to Fresh Filter.

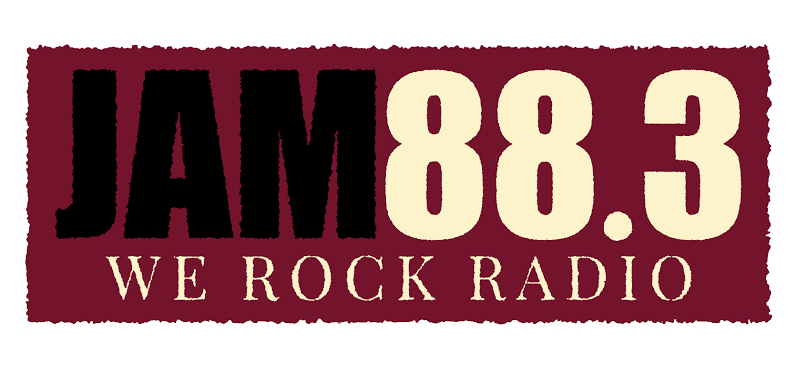
Logo from 2022 to 2026

In March 2021, Jam transferred from its longtime home in Strata 2000 to Paragon Plaza. Its booth in Unit 906-A was formerly used by K-Lite.

In June 2022, the Jam branding was dropped. By the end of August, its programs were axed.

On October 3, 2022, the Jam branding was brought back. Dubbed as The Awakening, it expanded its playlist timeline, focusing on music from the 1990s to the present. A month later, it launched a new set of programs, such as Lokal, a program similar to Republik.

On January 8, 2026, Jam transferred its booth to neighboring Unit 906-B, which was formerly used by XFM.

== Compilation albums ==
- Jam Sessions - Radio Live (2004)
- Jam 88.3's Not Another Christmas Album (2004)
- The Blend: a Jam-cappella album (Star Music, 2005)
- Doobie Nights (Independent Music, 2005)
- UltraelectromagneticJam: The Music of The Eraserheads (Sony Music Philippines, 2005)
- Not Another Christmas Album (PolyEast Records, 2006)
- Indiscreet: Fresh Music Exposed (PolyEast Records Philippines, 2010)
- Fresh Filter: Volume 1: a compilation album on vinyl consisting of 12 songs from different Filipino independent music acts, co-produced by Satchmi.
- Bigkas Pilipinas on Jam 88.3 (self-released, 2018)

== Awards ==
- 17th KBP Golden Dove Award for BEST FM RADIO STATION (2008)
- 16th KBP Golden Dove Award for Best Magazine Program Host (Patti, 2007)
- 16th KBP Golden Dove Award for Best Radio Documentary Program (Audiofiles, 2007)
- KBP Golden Dove Award for Outstanding Station Produced Radio Commercial (Team Asia Seminar, 2004)
- KBP Golden Dove Award for Outstanding Station Promotion Material - Radio (Info Jam, 2004)
- 7th Philippine Web Awards (2004)Best Web Site Media & Entertainment JAM 88.3 your kind of mix www.jam883.fm
- 8th Philippine Web Awards (2005)Best Web Site Entertainment Jam 88.3- Your Kind of Mix www.jam883.fm
