= DXEL =

Radio station in Zamboanga City, Philippines

Magic 95.5 (DXEL)
- Zamboanga City; Philippines
- Broadcast area: Zamboanga City, Basilan and surrounding areas
- Frequency: 95.5 MHz
- Branding: Magic 95.5

Programming
- Language: English
- Format: Top 40 (CHR), OPM
- Network: Magic Nationwide
- Affiliations: Tiger 22 Media Corporation

Ownership
- Owner: Golden Broadcast Professionals
- Operator: Quest Broadcasting Inc.
- Sister stations: DXGB-TV

History
- First air date: June 1993
- Call sign meaning: Eduardo and Lolita Chua (owners)

Technical information
- Licensing authority: NTC
- Power: 5,000 watts

DXEL (95.5 FM), broadcasting as Magic 95.5, is a radio station owned by Golden Broadcast Professionals Inc. and operated by Quest Broadcasting, Inc. It is the partner station of Tiger 22 Media Corporation as well as the sole regional station of Magic Nationwide. Its studios are located at GBPI Building, Campaner St., Zamboanga City.

== Profile ==
The station was launched in June 1993 as Gold FM. In 2000, Quest Broadcasting took over the station's operations and renamed it as Killerbee. On April 29, 2013, DXEL, along with other Killerbee stations, was relaunched under the Magic brand (adopted from Quest's parent station).

Aside from its regular programming, Magic 95.5 also airs the simulcast of Dateline TeleRadyo from sister TV station TV11.
