= DYBE =

Radio station in Bacolod, Philippines

Klick FM (DYBE)
- Bacolod; Philippines
- Broadcast area: Northern Negros Island, parts of Iloilo and Guimaras
- Frequency: 106.3 MHz
- Branding: Klick FM 106.3

Programming
- Languages: Hiligaynon, Filipino
- Format: Classic hits, OPM
- Network: Klick FM

Ownership
- Owner: Quest Broadcasting Inc.
- Operator: 5K Broadcasting Network
- Sister stations: through 5K: 101.5 K5 News FM

History
- First air date: 1993
- Former names: Killerbee (1993–2013); Magic (2013–2022); K-Five (2022–2023)
- Call sign meaning: Bee (former monicker)

Technical information
- Licensing authority: NTC
- Power: 10,000 watts
- ERP: 17,000 watts

DYBE (106.3 FM), broadcasting as Klick FM 106.3, is a radio station owned by Quest Broadcasting Inc. and operated by 5K Broadcasting Network. Its studios and transmitter are located at Puentebella Subd., Purok 5, Brgy. Taculing, Bacolod.

== History ==
DYBE first signed on the air in 1993 as Killerbee 106.3 with a Top 40 format. On April 29, 2013, this station, along with the other Killerbee stations, were relaunched under the Magic moniker (adopted from its then-parent station). It went off the air sometime in 2022.

In November 2022, the station returned to the airwaves as K-Five under the management of 5K Broadcasting Network, which operates 103.9 Radyo Bandera Sweet FM. It airs a classic hits format. In September 2023, it rebranded as Klick FM.
