= DWRT-FM =

Radio station in Metro Manila, Philippines

XFM Mega Manila (DWRT)
- Makati; Philippines
- Broadcast area: Mega Manila and surrounding areas
- Frequency: 99.5 MHz
- Branding: 99.5 XFM

Programming
- Language: Filipino
- Format: Contemporary MOR, News, Talk
- Network: XFM

Ownership
- Owner: Real Radio Network, Inc.
- Operator: Y2H Broadcasting Network, Inc.

History
- First air date: September 6, 1976
- Former names: RT (1976–2006, 2008–2012); Hit FM (2007–2008); Campus (2008); Play FM (2012–2025)
- Call sign meaning: Emilio Remedios Tuason (former owner)

Technical information
- Licensing authority: NTC
- Power: 25,000 watts
- ERP: 60,000 watts

Links
- Webcast: Watch Live via Facebook

DWRT (99.5 FM), broadcasting as 99.5 XFM, is a radio station owned by Real Radio Network, Inc. and operated under an airtime lease agreement by Y2H Broadcasting Network. Its studio is located at 4th Floor, Guadalupe Commercial Complex, EDSA, Brgy. Guadalupe Nuevo, Makati, while its transmitter is located at Palos Verdes Executive Village, Sumulong Highway, Brgy. Sta. Cruz, Antipolo.

== History ==
=== 1976–2006: The first 99.5 RT ===
Trans-Radio Broadcasting Corporation was founded in 1971 by Emilio Remedios Tuason after acquiring Transit Broadcasting Corporation, owner of 990 kHz. The station became DZTR Radyo Pilipino.

In September, 1976, Trans-Radio launched its FM station 99.5 RT, the Philippines' first Top 40 station. After a fire broke out in its first home along Quezon Avenue in Quezon City in 1978, the station relocated to Ayala Avenue in Makati.

Tuason, also known on-air as J.W. Christian and E.T., served as a DJ until his retirement in 1987. Mike Pedero, another DJ, was programming manager until 1980, when he left for RK96 Real Radio.

99.5 RT rose in popularity by introducing British and American acts, notably popularizing "More to Lose" by Seona Dancing in the early 1980s, disguised as "Medium" by "Fade".

Between 1983 and 1986, RT covered major political events, including the Aquino assassination, the 1986 snap elections, and the People Power Revolution.

In 1985, rival Kiss FM 101.1 was launched and, not long after, overtook RT in the ratings. In response, RT rebranded as Red Hot Radio, focusing on new wave music, but the format failed. It reverted to the original format a year later, then shifted briefly to modern rock in 1989, and reverted again to the original format by the early 1990s.

==== Programming ====
Over the years, 99.5 RT used various slogans, including "The Sound of the City" (1976–77), "The Rhythm of the City" (1980–1996, 2008–2012), and "The Most Hit Music" (2001–2006), among others.

RT aired syndicated shows like American Top 40 and Rick Dees Weekly Top 40, and in 1983–84, launched a music video program, Rhythm of the City, on MBS-4, featuring international artists before MTV reached Asia.

The station gained further popularity with 24K Friday, its oldies program featuring hits from the '70s, '80s, and '90s.

In 1995, RT became the first Philippine radio station to launch a presence on the Internet, starting with a bulletin board system.

==== New ownership ====
On June 14, 1996, RT was sold to a group led by Bobet Vera of Quest Broadcasting (owners of Magic 89.9) under Real Radio Network. Despite the change in ownership, RT maintained its upmarket format. During that time, the station aired Channel [V] program Asian Top 20 Countdown until it was renamed Channel [V] Countdown.

In April 1999, the station relocated to its longtime studios at unit 906-B of the Paragon Plaza Building in Mandaluyong.

By the early 2000s, RT's format shifted closer to mainstream Top 40, with many veteran DJs replaced by younger talent. New shows included Up and Coming, RT40, On the Decks, David's House, RT Sunday Sessions, The Get Up and Go Show, Dinner and Drive Show and The Playground. In 2004, RT launched the annual Ripe Tomatoes concert featuring local OPM bands.

In December 2006, management decided to rebrand the station. At midnight on December 18, RT signed off after 30 years. On January 1, 2007, it relaunched as HiT 99.5.

=== 2007–2008: Hit FM ===
On January 1, 2007, Hit 99.5 was launched, with its programs launched on January 8. Despite retaining RT's format, it was more content-driven and targeted high school and college youth, resembling its Davao counterpart, 105.9 Mix FM. By August, it was rebranded as 99.5 Hit FM.

Hit FM signed off on March 19, 2008 (Holy Wednesday), with "Nice to Know You" by Incubus as its final song. Some of its on-air staff later moved to Jam 88.3 and Magic 89.9.

=== 2008: Campus ===
Campus 99.5

On March 23, 2008 (Easter Sunday), the station returned on air as 99.5 Campus FM. It was led by DJs displaced from Barangay LS 97.1 a year after its shift to a mass-based format from its Top 40 format as Campus Radio 97.1 WLS-FM, alongside some of the former Hit FM jocks. In May 2008, it was renamed Campus 99.5, and its DJs were known as the Campus Air Force.

On August 14, 2008, Campus abruptly ended due to management issues and weak sales, and switched to an automated music format. The show BrewRats! continued briefly until August 21, followed by a one-week hiatus.

Campus Radio was later revived as an internet station on March 21, 2009. However, it ceased operations in 2012.

=== 2008–2012: The second 99.5 RT ===
99.5 RT logo used from September 1, 2008, to 2009. The modified 2003–06 logo with the slogan "Rhythm of The City" is set in Impact with the red line at the bottom.

On September 1, 2008, at 6 AM, the station was relaunched as 99.5 RT. Joshua Z was the first DJ on air, joined by others from the station's previous iteration of RT, HiT, and Campus. 99.5 revived its classic slogan, "The Rhythm of the City," and adopted a more eclectic playlist with DJs speaking in Taglish, aiming to recapture the spirit of RT's original era.

In 2009, RT adopted the slogan, "The Best Music on the Planet," shared with its sister station 105.9 Mix FM in Davao. Every summer (April to June), it used the classic "Red Hot Radio" slogan from the 1980s. In 2010, RT also launched The Farm, an on-air training program for aspiring student DJs.

In October 2010, RT shifted to a rock-leaning Top 40 format and adopted the slogan "The Drive", inspired by its Sunday night show. RT also began playing select '90s and early 2000s tracks (up to 3 per hour) to promote 24K Weekend.

By June 2011, RT shifted to an indie-leaning Adult Top 40 format and brought back its old slogan, "The Best Music on the Planet".

In mid-October 2012, 99.5 RT began a reformatting process, letting go of half its on-air staff and ending several shows. Although it retained the RT brand, new teasers — including a "station under construction" stinger — signaled changes. On December 9, 2012, 99.5 RT signed off for the last time, with Koji Moralez as the final DJ and "Kings and Queens" by Thirty Seconds to Mars as its last song.

=== 2012–2025: Play FM ===
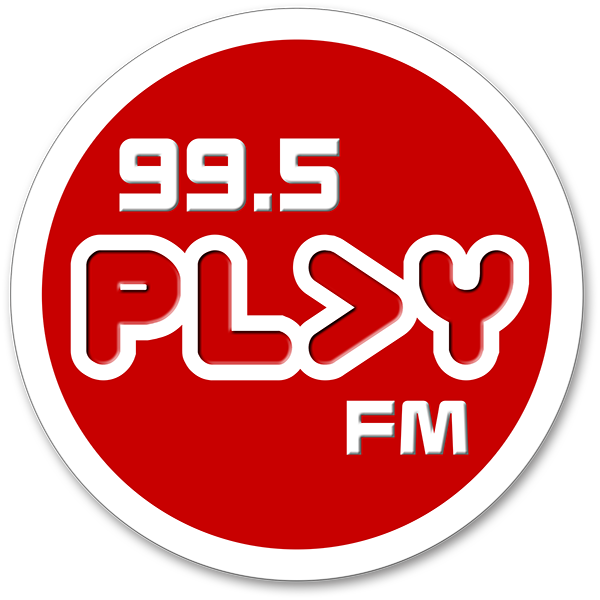
99.5 Play FM logo from 2016 until 2025.

On December 10, 2012, at 6 AM, 99.5 Play FM was launched. The first on-air team included socialite Tim Yap, Sam Oh (RT mainstay), and former Magic 89.9 DJ Nikko, followed by remaining RT staff and junior jocks laterally promoted from Magic. The first song played was "Play" by Jennifer Lopez. The station's programming and imaging mirrored that of Magic 89.9 and the defunct 99.5 Hit FM, albeit targeting a younger audience.

The official jingles and audio imaging for 99.5 Play FM were launched on September 15, 2014, months after Rizal "Sonny B" Aportadera joined the station. These jingles were produced by Sound Quadrat, a German audio imaging company, in collaboration with its US-based subsidiary Benztown Branding. Their clients include top European CHR stations like BBC Radio 1 (UK), Europa Plus (Russia), NRJ (France), and Play FM's former sister station, 103.5 K-Lite.

Before 2014, Play FM DJs had the freedom to ad-lib as they wished. However, after the revamp, on-air spiels were limited to 60 seconds (except during advertising commitments) to allow more songs to air. This restriction did not apply to specific shows like Club Play and Play It Live, where DJs had more time for artist interviews, guest interactions, and live performances.

After the Rodrigo Duterte administration took office in 2016, Aportadera and Carlo Jose left 99.5 Play FM to join the Philippine Broadcasting Service under then-PCOO Secretary Martin Andanar for its revitalization. In January 2017, Lil' Joey was appointed station manager. The station updated its stingers while retaining its jingles, which were created by Sound Quadrat and Benztown Branding. It also relaunched with the tagline "Just Press Play" and the slogan "Number 1 for New Music and All the Hits."

In 2018, CJ Rivera (CJ the DJ), the music and program director of Magic 89.9, was appointed station manager, a role he held until his retirement in 2023. Under his leadership, the station revamped its jingles once again, featuring the voice of DJ Renzo from The Home Run. The Playback music block, showcasing hits from the 2000s and early 2010s, was moved to Thursdays. Rivera died on August 20, 2024 after battling cancer.

At the onset of the COVID-19 pandemic, Play FM reduced its transmitting power, limited its broadcast hours, and shifted to an all-music format. Despite financial struggles and a significant layoff of on-air staff, the station continued to update its music catalog.

On May 1, 2025 at 12:00 AM, Play FM quietly signed off for the last time. This marked the end of the station's CHR/Top 40 format after 49 years since the station's inception.

=== 2025–present: XFM ===
On March 19, 2025, Y2H Broadcasting Network signed an airtime lease agreement with Real Radio Network Inc., in which it would lease the station's airtime. Prior to this, Y2H secured similar arrangements for 92.3 FM in Cebu and 89.1 FM in Davao, both owned by RRNI's sister company Quest Broadcasting.

On May 1, 2025, the station began a series of test broadcast airing automated music with stingers voiced by Jupiter Torres.

On June 8, 2025, 99.5 XFM was officially launched with a news and music format. In the interim, the new management continued to use the former Play FM studios for its operations.

On June 28, 2025, XFM launched its weekend programming with The Gospel Hour while its first phase of news and public affairs programming began three days later with a 6:30 am newscast anchored by Torres, as well as the commentary program Bullseye, hosted by former DZXL anchors Buddy Oberas (also from Abante Radyo) and Deo de Guzman. Two days later, XFM News Nationwide was transferred to Manila from 104.7 XFM Palawan, with Oberas and Kim Mangunay replacing Gilbert Basio, Aizy Pacaldo, and Pedy Bautista-Sabando. Additionally, Bryan de Paz from UNTV 37 and Earl Saludar from Net 25 were recruited as the station's first field reporting team.

On August 11, 2025, XFM rolled out its second phase of programs with Torres moving to the 4:30 am slot as host of Xcitingg Pilipinas, and XPress Balita adjusted 30 minutes earlier to 6:00 am. This coincided with the transfer of ex-News5 and DWWW anchorman Joel Gorospe to the station as anchor of an expanded three-hour Bullseye while de Guzman was named as anchor of Sentro (later renamed as Xentro) at 10 am. Two weeks later, XFM Mega Manila's third phase of expansion saw the premiere of its afternoon love-advice program X-Rated, hosted by Viva artist Erika Balagtas. On August 31, XFM added a new weekly news review program, XPress The News hosted by de Paz.

On September 24, 2025, XFM relocated to the Guadalupe Commercial Complex in Makati, which used to house RMN's DZXL and iFM before both stations consolidated operations to Atlanta Centre in San Juan.

On May 5, 2026, Joel Gorospe departed from XFM after just nine months to become station manager of Aliw Broadcasting Corporation's DWIZ 882. Former DZME and D8TV anchor Jorge Bandola became his permanent replacement as host of Bullseye after three weeks of music filler for the weekday 6:30 AM slot.

Further personnel changes occurred in September 2026 with Deo de Guzman leaving XFM to concentrate on his new automotive business and DZME news writer Melanie Ocampo joining the network as anchor and reporter. Bryan de Paz's nephew Eric also joined the station as a field reporter in October, a few months after graduating from college.

== Compilation CDs of DWRT-FM ==
- 24K Friday (MCA Music Philippines, 2006)
- 24K Friday 2 (MCA Music Philippines, 2007)
- Freestyle: "Playlist" (Viva Records, 2009)

== See also ==
- Y101 Cebu
- Solid FM Cebu
- XFM Davao
