= DWOW =

Radio station in Metro Manila, Philippines

All Radio (DWOW)
- Mandaluyong; Philippines
- Broadcast area: Mega Manila and surrounding areas
- Frequency: 103.5 MHz
- Branding: All Radio 103.5

Programming
- Languages: English, Filipino
- Format: Adult contemporary, OPM

Ownership
- Owner: Advanced Media Broadcasting System
- Sister stations: DZMV-TV (All TV)

History
- First air date: December 18, 1979
- Former call signs: DWIM (1979–1986); DWCS (1986–1995); DWKX (1995–2010)
- Former names: DPI Radio 1 (1979–1986); DWCS (1986–1995); Heart FM (2007); Max FM (2007–2010); Wow FM (2010–2013); K-Lite (1995–2006, 2013–2023)
- Call sign meaning: Wow FM (former branding)

Technical information
- Licensing authority: NTC
- Class: ABC
- Power: 18,000 watts
- ERP: 60,000 watts

Links
- Webcast: Listen Live
- Website: allradio1035.com.ph

DWOW (103.5 FM), broadcasting as All Radio 103.5, is a radio station owned and operated by the Advanced Media Broadcasting System. Its studios are located at the Worldwide Corporate Center, Shaw Boulevard, Mandaluyong, and its transmitter is located at Unit 906A, Paragon Plaza Building, EDSA cor. Reliance St., Mandaluyong.

== History ==
=== 1979–1986: DPI Radio ===
The frequency was originally owned by the government of the Philippines through the Department of Public Information. It began its broadcast on December 18, 1979, under the call letters DWIM-FM. It was then a simulcast station of DPI Radio 1 710 kHz, which aired music and news.

=== 1986–1995: DWCS ===
In 1986, when DPI Radio 1 moved to 104.3 MHz, the frequency was sold to the Archdiocese of Manila through Global Broadcasting System (which would acquire Radyo Veritas from Philippine Radio Educational and Information Center, Inc. five years later) via a government-sponsored bidding. The call letters were changed to DWCS and aired a standards format.

=== 1995–2006: The first K-Lite ===
K-Lite logo from 2005 to 2006.

In 1995, the station was sold to the Vera Group through the then-newly established Advanced Media Broadcasting System under the helm of Jinji Buhain (a niece of then-Manila Auxiliary Bishop Teodoro Buhain). It changed its call letters to DWKX and moved to the Philcomcen Building in Pasig.

K-Lite started airing on October 23, 1995. Joe Schmoe was the first to go on board with his first song "Pride (In the Name of Love)" by U2, followed by Paul Reno, Jay Latin, Dick Reese, Joshua, Martin Gill and Little David. It was dubbed as Manila's "First Interactive Radio Station" as it aired an adult contemporary format with daring, thought provoking talk. Within a few months, it became one of the favorite radio stations of young professionals and hip listeners.

Through the years, K-Lite aired quality talk shows, including the groundbreaking program, Talk Back with Joshua and Jinji (replaced by Vince Faner and Amy Godniez in 1998), as well as Nitelite with Li'l David, Monica and The Blade, Girl Talk with Monica and Jinji, Sportslite with Anthony Suntay and Twisted with Jessica Zafra and Li'l David. K-Lite started the trend of talk shows becoming a staple on the FM band.

The station later changed its format to attract more audiences from different demographics. From "The Right Kind of Lite" format in the late 1990s, to "Best Music of the 80s, 90s & Today" at the turn of the century, to "Manila's Lite Alternative" from 2003 to 2006. By then, K-Lite has switched its format to Modern AC.

103.5 K-Lite created promotional events that were more than just listener parties. The station brought their loyal listeners to front row seats at the Grammy Awards, international concert tours and celebrity events, and later on, serving free Starbucks Coffee to the call center agents. K-Lite also made its milestone as the first radio station that covered The Dodgeball Cup on The Morning Brew.

Disc jockeys of K-Lite made their final broadcast all together on November 30, 2006, to give thanks to their loyal listeners.

Its lite alternative format has since been carried over to sister station Jam 88.3.

=== 2007: Heart FM ===
On January 1, 2007, Heart 103.5 debuted on the airwaves as "Easy Listening the Way it Should Be". The format was easy listening (a mix of contemporary alternative & R&B). They later switched their slogan to "Easy Listening. Redefined."

Heart 1035 had a number of promotional events in the span of six months (Heart Cinemania Premieres, Drives & Jives Stickering, Heart on Air & Ice, Voices for Albay, and others). But in May 2007, Heart 1035 sponsored "The Best Damn Thing Contest" where they sent one of their loyal listeners to Hong Kong to meet Avril Lavigne in person for a special Asian Launch of her album The Best Damn Thing at the Hong Kong Convention Center.

Also in May 2007, Heart 1035 won the award for Caltex Fastbreak to the NBA Promo as "The Best Radio Station in Execution of a Promo" beating out other competing radio stations (Jam 88.3, Wave 89.1, Magic 89.9, Monster RX 93.1, Hit 99.5, and 105.1 Crossover).

On June 18, 2007, the Heart personalities made their final broadcast as a group.

=== 2007–2010: Max FM ===
At exactly 9:00 PM of June 19, 2007 (originally planned 12:00 MN of July 2, 2007), 103.5 presented a new format that sounded more mature akin to Top 40. The music covers both old and new hits with a new station name: 103.5 (initially read on air as one-oh-three and-a-half) MAX FM. Their slogan was "In Tune with Manila". The format resembles that of the first iteration of 99.5 RT, which at that time was known as 99.5 Hit FM.

Max FM logo from 2009 to 2010.

In mid-2009, the station's sound shifted to a predominantly dance format, with new slogans "Move To It!" and "Manila's Leading Dance Source", introduced to emphasize as such. DWKX's flip to dance put them in competition with DZUR, whose direction focuses mostly on pure underground club content, as opposed to DWKX's straight-ahead broader approach. In addition, DWKX also became the first fully licensed commercial dance radio outlet to cover Metro Manila since the demise of 89 DMZ, whose frequency is currently occupied by rhythmic contemporary sister station Wave 891.

On June 19, 2010, right on the third anniversary of the station, and prior to that, it underwent some minor changes, among others the line-up of DJs and their shows, the revision of how they identify themselves on-air (they dropped the "one-oh-three and-a-half Max FM" in favor of "one-oh-three point five Max FM", as the former is said to be not that much suitable for radio), and the dropping of some of its long-running local programs and foreign syndicated dance programs.

On August 5, 2010, the jocks of Maxville made their final broadcast to give thanks to their listeners. Max FM resurfaced as an Internet radio station now called Global Max Radio, which was launched on October 1, 2010.

=== 2010–2013: Wow FM ===
Wow FM logo from 2010 to 2013.

On August 23, 2010, the station rebranded as 103.5 Wow FM and changed to its current call letters, DWOW. This marked TRPI's (and now Tiger 22's) first and only venture into the mainstream, mass-based market. Laila Chikadora was the first DJ to go on board that morning, followed by Mister Fu & other top-rated DJs. The station's tagline is "Lahveet!", which is the Tagalog bastardization of "Love it!" which was later replaced by "Labas Dila... Weeeh!".

Following the resignation of Mr. Fu (who returned to his originating radio station Energy FM) and Francine Prieto, the remaining DJs had their final broadcast on July 17.

=== 2013–2023: The second K-Lite ===
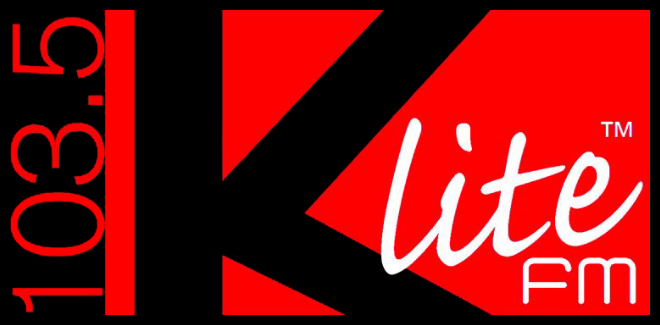
K-Lite's 2nd Iteration logo from 2013 to 2016

On July 22, 2013, at 6:00 AM, the station brought back its K-Lite branding with the new slogan, "The Hits and Lite Favorites". It carried a Hot Adult Contemporary format, playing hits from the mid-90s up to today. EJ Electric was the first DJ to go on board, followed by other jocks, mostly from the Max FM/Wow FM roster & other stations. The official launch was made on August 1, 2013. During its first weeks of operation, the stations studios remained inside the Jollibee Plaza building, before it was transferred back to Paragon Plaza. Among its special programs were Classic Lite, Faster than Lite and Lite Wave.

On April 21, 2014, K-Lite reformatted as a Top 40 station, similar to the ones of sister stations 99.5 Play FM and Magic 89.9. It carried the slogan The Beat of Manila (similar to the summer slogan of Magic).

On August 18, 2014, K-Lite reformatted once more as a Classic Hits station, focusing on music from the 1990s to mid 2000s. It carried the slogan "Metro Manila's Official Take Me Back Station". This time, it introduced new DJs.

On November 24, 2014, K-Lite reformatted back its original Adult Contemporary format, this time emphasizing more on the music from the 1990s up to 5 years behind the current year. On the same year, it launched a separate show entitled Past Forward, a Wednesday program which airs music from the 1980s.

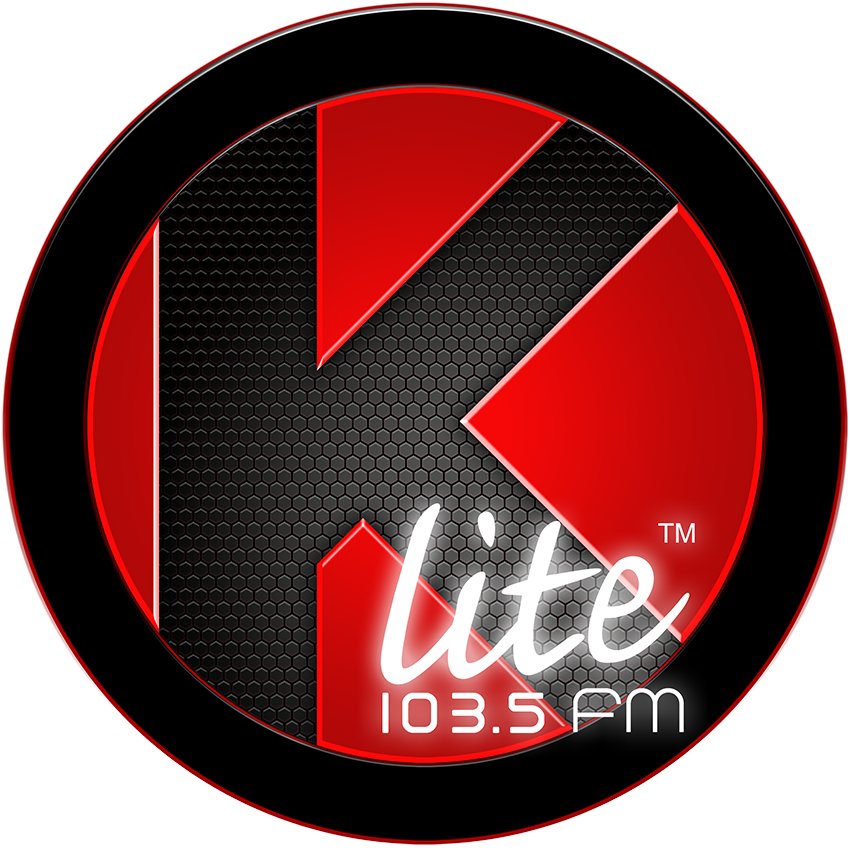
K-Lite logo from 2016 to 2022

In 2016, K-Lite added its new slogan "The Hits of the 90s and 2K, Today", a reflection of its old slogan. This would later become its primary slogan beginning 2017.

On April 26, 2020, K-Lite temporarily went off the air amid the community quarantine imposed in Metro Manila due to COVID-19.

On January 5, 2021, it returned on air, albeit on automation mode and limited broadcast hours. On May 15, 2021, the station laid off all of its employees due to the economic effects of the pandemic.

In September 2021, Advanced Media Broadcasting System was acquired by the Villar-backed firm Planet Cable.

K-Lite logo from 2022 to 2023

In May 2022, K-Lite launched its TV simulcast channel on Planet Cable; it later became available as a digital subchannel of ALLTV. It also marked the return of one of its original jocks, Jaybee Jariol.

On July 28, 2022, K-Lite transferred to its new home in Starmall EDSA-Shaw in Mandaluyong.

In September 2022, K-Lite's TV counterpart was simulcast on ALLTV's first week of broadcast during nighttime.

On December 1, 2023, the station dropped the K-Lite branding and changed to its interim name 103.5 FM.

=== 2024–present: All Radio ===
On January 1, 2024, the station became All Radio with a soft adult contemporary format.

By early 2026, it shifted to a mainstream adult contemporary format. On April 25, it relaunched its TV counterpart All Radio TV on Planet Cable Channel 3, along with new weekend programs.

On September 21, All Radio and ALLTV transferred to the former facilities of the now-defunct CNN Philippines in Worldwide Corporate Center.

== Compilation CDs ==
=== As 103.5 Max FM ===
- Party On Weekends 5 (Galaxy Records, 2007)
- Pink Party (Galaxy Records, 2007)
- Tunog Kalye (Universal Records, 2007)
- Bagong Tunog, Bagong Banda (Dyna Music, 2008)

=== As Wow FM ===
- Wow Lahveet! (Sony Music, 2010)
