= Quest Broadcasting =

Filipino radio broadcast company

Quest Broadcasting Inc.
- Formerly: SBS Radio Network (1986–1992)
- Type: Private
- Industry: Mass media Radio broadcasting
- Founded: January 1986; 40 years ago
- Founder: Leonardo S. Sarao; Leonida Laki-Vera; Luis Vera
- Headquarters: Unit 907, 9th Floor, Paragon Plaza Building, EDSA corner Reliance Street in Barangay Barangka Ilaya, Mandaluyong, Metro Manila, Philippines
- Area served: Worldwide (online)
- Key people: Atty. Jose Luis "Bobet" Vera (President)
- Brands: Magic 89.9
- Parent: The Vera Group
- Divisions: Magic Nationwide
- Website: www.magic899.com

Quest Broadcasting Inc. (QBI) is a Filipino media company based in Mandaluyong, Philippines. It primarily operates a network of radio stations under the Magic Nationwide brands. Its corporate office is located at the Unit 907, 9th floor, Paragon Plaza, EDSA cor. Reliance St., Mandaluyong.

== History ==
The company was established in 1986 as the SBS Radio Network Inc. (Sarao Broadcasting Systems), co-owned by the Sarao family (owner of Las Piñas-based Sarao Motors) and the Vera family (original owners of FBS Radio Network). In 1992, Luis and Leonida Vera's eldest son, Atty. Jose Luis Vera, took full control of the company and renamed it as Quest Broadcasting Inc.

On December 12, 2012, Philippine President Benigno Aquino III signed Republic Act No. 10342 grants Quest Broadcasting, Inc.'s legislative franchise for another 25 years. The law granted QBI hereunder referred to as the grantee, its successors or assigns, a franchise to construct, install, establish, operate and maintain for commercial purposes and/ in the public interest, radio broadcasting stations and television broadcasting stations, including digital television system in the Philippines, where frequencies and/or channels are still available for radio broadcasting, through microwave, satellite or whatever means, including the use of any new technologies in radio systems, with the corresponding technological auxiliaries and facilities, special broadcast and other program and distribution services and relay stations in the Philippines.

In April 2013, all Killerbee stations in regional areas started carrying the Magic branding (adopted from its Manila flagship station).

By 2022, its regional stations were leased to different management, leaving DXEL in Zamboanga as the sole regional station of Magic Nationwide.

== Radio stations ==
=== Magic Nationwide stations ===
Branding	Callsign	Frequency	Location
Magic 89.9	DWTM	89.9 MHz	Metro Manila
Magic Zamboanga (Note: Owned by Golden Broadcast Professionals. Operated by Quest under a local marketing agreement.)	DXEL	95.5 MHz	Zamboanga City

=== Other stations ===
Branding	Callsign	Frequency	Location	Operator
Solid FM Cebu	DYBN	92.3 MHz	Cebu City	Y2H Broadcasting Network
XFM Davao	DXBE	89.1 MHz	Davao City	Y2H Broadcasting Network
Klick FM Bacolod	DYBE	106.3 MHz	Bacolod	5K Broadcasting Network
K5 News FM Cagayan de Oro	DXKB	89.3 MHz	Cagayan de Oro	5K Broadcasting Network

=== Former stations ===
Callsign	Frequency	Location	Notes
DZKX	103.1 MHz	Lucena	Currently owned by Y2H Broadcasting Network.
DYII	92.7 MHz	Tagbilaran	Owned by Vimcontu Broadcasting Corporation. Operations taken over by Groove Deejayz Entertainment Solutions.
DYSR	95.1 MHz	Dumaguete	Currently independent as SR95.
DXKM	106.3 MHz	General Santos	Owned by Advanced Media Broadcasting System. Currently off the air.
