= DWTM =

Radio station in Metro Manila, Philippines

Magic 89.9 (DWTM)
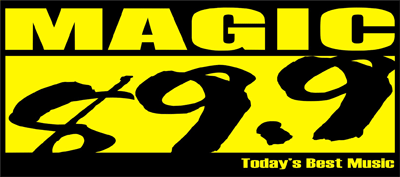
- Mandaluyong; Philippines
- Broadcast area: Mega Manila and surrounding areas
- Frequency: 89.9 MHz
- RDS: MAGIC 89.9
- Branding: Magic 89.9

Programming
- Language: English
- Format: Top 40 (CHR), OPM
- Network: Magic Nationwide
- Affiliations: Tiger 22 Media Corporation

Ownership
- Owner: Quest Broadcasting Inc.

History
- First air date: February 14, 1986; 40 years ago
- Call sign meaning: We're The Magic

Technical information
- Licensing authority: NTC
- Class: A, B, C, D, E
- Power: 25,000 watts
- ERP: 60,000 watts

Links
- Webcast: Listen Live (via Zeno); Watch Live; Listen live (via TuneIn)
- Website: magic899.com

DWTM (89.9 FM), broadcasting as Magic 89.9, is a radio station owned and operated by Quest Broadcasting Inc. It serves as the flagship station of Magic Nationwide and the flagship partner station of Tiger 22 Media. The station's studios and transmitter are located at Unit 907, 9th floor, Paragon Plaza, EDSA cor. Reliance St., Mandaluyong.

== History ==
=== 1980s: Early programming and "The Battle of the Radios" trend ===
The station began its regular operations on February 14, 1986, under the ownership of the CDC Radio Network, Inc. (also known as Central Development Communications), and broadcasting from the now-demolished Philippine Communications Center building (PHILCOMCEN) in Pasig, starting with a 10 on-air crew led by Bernie Buenaseda, known on-air as "Burning Bernie". It became a witness to history unfolding before the Filipinos as the station was also started 11 days before the late Corazon "Cory" Aquino became president and 7 months exactly before ABS-CBN was reopened. At that time, DWTM operated 21 hours a day, starting its broadcast day at 5 am until signing off the following morning at 2 am.

Between 1988 and 1989, the station started broadcasting 24 hours a day, which turned out to be a huge success. "The Battle of the Radios" during that era, was supported by a wide variety of spoofs and gimmicks not to mention sidekicks, (no computers, no hard drives; just a bunch of wires and switches) which made broadcasting ultra-creative as compared to that done with the digital technology of today.

=== 1990s: The emergence of Love Notes ===
Magic 89.9 became the first home of "Love Notes" that started in 1988, which was initially conceptualized as a gimmick. The 15 minute counseling program hosted by Joe D'Mango became an instant hit with office workers every Friday morning. Love Notes is also aired on ABC-5 (now TV5) from 1993 to 1998 and became an eponymous movie that produced by VIVA Films in 1995. It transferred to its sister station Wave 89.1 in 2001. The show returned on DZMM in 2011, but moved to Radyo Singko (now FM Radio Manila) in 2012, and lasted until 2013.

On November 29, 1999, Magic 89.9 transferred its studios from PHILCOMCEN Building in Pasig to the Paragon Plaza Building in Mandaluyong to share facilities with sister stations 99.5 RT (now 99.5 XFM) and 103.5 K-Lite (now AllRadio), DWBL 1242, and Mellow Touch 94.7 (now Mellow 94.7 BFM) and DWSS 1494 (now Abante).

=== 2000s: Good Times and Boys Night Out popularity ===
Since its inception, the station started a trend on FM radio of making Fridays nostalgia days with the Friday Magic Madness program (now Friday Madness), that plays music from the 1980s hit music all day. On the other hand, weekend program Saturday Slam plays the 1990s music.

In 2000, Magic 89.9 changed its present-logo, designed by artist Ferdinand "Mac" Antonio that year, it was part of a logo design competition hosted from the station itself, to create a new identity, as the station rolled through 21st century. Around 1999, a DJ friend asked if he (the artist) could create a logo for the competition. The logo and design would eventually become part of Philippine radio history.

Mo Twister, after four years in hiatus, returned to Magic 89.9, with Good Times With Mo (Limited Edition). He returned again in February 2006 with Good Times With Mo, along with Mojo Jojo, then a late night show. In June 2006, it was transferred to the morning slot (6-9 AM) with a third co-host, Andi. She, however resigned in February 2007, and was replaced by Maui Taylor. Maui retired on May 30, 2007, so Andi9 returned in June 2007, only to leave again in November 2007. The third co-host was Noelle Bonus.

On July 17, 2007, The Magic website was in operation once more to serve the net surfing Magic 89.9 listeners here and especially abroad. Recent additions to the Magic list of programs include the American Top 40 (AT40) which is hosted by American Idol presenter and American radio and TV personality Ryan Seacrest, as well as BigFish Radio hosted by Johnboy Lee of BigFish Manila every Saturday nights which features exclusive programs by international club DJs such as Paul Van Dyk, David Guetta, Armin van Buuren and others.

=== 2010s: The Magic's 30th Anniversary Celebration ===
In January 2014, Mo Twister returned on his morning show Good Times with his new co-host Sam Oh (from its previous timeslot First Thing in the Morning while Good Times was under a 5-month suspension) and Filipino-Canadian internet sensation Mikey Bustos.

On May 31, 2014, the station brought back its Saturday night club timeslot with the debut of Saturday Night Takeover mixed by the country's popular club DJs such as Ace Ramos, Mars Miranda, Marc Marasigan, Deuce Manila, Katsy Lee, Travis Monsod, Ron Poe among others.

After 27 year, Lovenotes returned on air on November 6, 2015. On December 26, 2015, Saturday Slam aired for the last time. Super Hit Sunday, consists of mornings with the Junior Jocks to afternoons with selected weekend/fill-in DJs, extended to Saturdays, becoming Super Hit Weekend.

On February 28, 2016, Magic celebrated its 30th anniversary with major changes in the programming. The station brought back its usual Sunday night slow jam program Sunday Slowdown, after a decade of being replaced by another re-titled program Slow Flow, and later, Nothing Noisy. It also shifted the timeframe of Friday Madness from the original 1980s to the 1990s and 2000s. In November the same year, the station held its 30th anniversary concert featuring OPM icons Ely Buendia and Rico Blanco at Eastwood City.

In July 2017, Delamar Arias from Monster RX 93.1 joined the station, Andi Manzano also returned and co-host the weekly family-oriented program The Mother Show along with Rikiflo.

=== 2020s: Post-pandemic ===
On March 17, 2020, as a result of the community quarantine lockdown measures posed by the COVID-19 pandemic in the Philippines, the station went on full music automation, its air staff told to stay-at-home, and its broadcast reduced drastically. As the country gradually returns to normalcy, the station began reinstating its now-reduced airstaff, and allows livestreaming overnight; as of 2024, overnight radio broadcasts remain off-the-air.

On August 5, 2022, the station brought back Retro in the Metro, this time as a segment of Friday Madness, featuring music from the 1980s in the morning and afternoon for one hour each.

On February 14, 2024, after few months of hiatus, Good Times with Mo returned on air with Mo Twister and Sam Oh as hosts.

On February 17, 2024, the station brought back Saturday Slam, this time featuring music from the 1980s to the early 1990s. Retro in the Metro moved to Saturday afternoons, this time featuring music from the late 1970s. By November 23, it was revamped as a music block featuring hip-hop and R&B music.

On December 6, 2024, the 1980s music was added back to the Friday Madness playlist, with most of the 2000s music transferred to the Saturday program Y2K Vibes. The station also brought back Sunday Slowdown two days later, this time as an all-day program.

On January 3, 2025, Love Notes aired again for the third time, after years of being hiatus.

On May 19, 2025, Boys Night Out moved back to the 9-12 mn slot, occupying for more weekly lifestyle and talk block every Mondays to Fridays at 6-9 pm, featuring the Junior Jocks and Tina Ryan. However, on October 2, Boys Night Out was abruptly cancelled due to tensions between the hosts and the station's management.

On November 15, 2025, both Y2K Vibes and Saturday Slam were replaced by a new program called All Hits Saturday, featuring music from the 2000s and the 2010s.

On May 16, 2026, the station brought back its Saturday night club/EDM program Party on Weekends after 2 decades of absence.

== Notable DJs ==
- Bam Aquino
- Mohan "Mo Twister" Gumatay
- Sam Oh
- Karylle Tatlonghari-Yuzon

== CD compilations ==
- Magic Urban Flow (MCA Music Philippines, 2005)
- Party on Weekends (EMI Music Philippines, 2005)
- Club Myx (EMI Music Philippines, 2006)
- Kami nAPO Muna (Universal Records, 2006)
- Party On Weekends (House Edition) (EMI Music Philippines, 2006)
- The Best Of Manila Sound: Hopia Mani Popcorn (Viva Records, 2006)
- Friday Madness OPM Edition/Retro In The Metro (Vicor Music, 2007)
- Kami nAPO Muna Ulit (Universal Records, 2007)
- Remember The OPM In The 80s (Vicor Music, 2007)
- The Best Of Manila Sound 2: Hopia Mani Popcorn (Viva Records, 2007)
- The Nicest Of The 90s (Viva Records, 2007)
- Friday Madness (MCA Music Philippines, 2009)
