= List of radio stations in Zamboanga Peninsula =

This is the list of radio stations in the Zamboanga Peninsula region in the Philippines.

== Sulu ==
=== AM stations ===
Frequency	Name	Company	Format	Call Sign	Power	Location Covered
774 AM	Radyo Pilipinas Jolo	Presidential Broadcast Service	news, public affairs, talk	DXSM	5 KW	Jolo
927 AM	DXMM	Sulu-Tawi Tawi Broadcasting Foundation	news, public affairs, talk, islamic radio	DXMM	5 KW	Jolo

=== FM stations ===
Frequency	Name	Company	Format	Call Sign	Power	Location Covered
87.9 FM	Radio Lupah Sug	—N/a	community radio	—N/a	5 KW	Jolo
98.8 FM	My Radio Heartbeat	—N/a	community radio	—N/a	5 KW	Luuk
99.3 FM	DXJT 99.3	Joint Task Force Sulu	community radio	DXJT	5 KW	Jolo

== Zamboanga City ==
=== AM stations ===
Frequency	Name	Company	Format	Call Sign	Power	Location Covered
855 AM	DZRH Zamboanga (relay from Manila)	Cebu Broadcasting Company (MBC Media Group)	Drama, News, Public Affairs, Talk,	DXZH	10 KW	Zamboanga City
900 AM	RMN Zamboanga	Radio Mindanao Network	Drama, News, Public Affairs, Talk	DXRZ	10 KW	Zamboanga City
1008 AM	Radyo Ronda Zamboanga	Radio Philippines Network	Drama, News, Public Affairs, Talk	DXXX	10 KW	Zamboanga City
1116 AM	1116 DXAS	Far East Broadcasting Company	News, Public Affairs, Religious, Talk	DXAS	10 KW	Zamboanga City
1170 AM	Radyo Pilipinas Zamboanga	Presidential Broadcast Service	Government Radio, News, Public Affairs, Talk	DXMR	10 KW	Zamboanga City
1287 AM	Super Radyo Zamboanga (relay from Manila)	GMA Network, Inc.	news, public affairs, talk	DXRC	10 KW	Zamboanga City
1467 AM	El Radyo Verdadero	Catholic Bishops Conference of the Philippines (Catholic Media Network), operated by the Archdiocese of Zamboanga	News, Public Affairs, Catholic radio, Talk	DXVP	10 KW	Zamboanga City

=== FM stations ===
Frequency	Name	Company	Format	Call Sign	Power	RDS ID	Location Covered
88.3 FM	Peace 88.3	AFP Western Mindanao Command	news, public affairs, talk	DXWC	10 KW		Zamboanga City
89.9 FM	Brigada News FM Zamboanga	Baycomms Broadcasting Corporation (Brigada Mass Media Corporation)	Contemporary MOR, OPM, News, Talk	DXZB	10 KW	BRIGADA	Zamboanga City
91.5 FM	Mango Radio Zamboanga (relay from Metro Davao)	RT Broadcast Specialist Philippines	Christian Contemporary	DXKZ	5 KW		Zamboanga City
93.1 FM	Radyo Sincero Zamboanga	Audiovisual Communicators (operated by Herbz Med Pharma Corporation)	Contemporary MOR, OPM	DXRX	5 KW		Zamboanga City
93.9 FM	Star FM Zamboanga	People's Broadcasting Service (Bombo Radyo Philippines)	contemporary MOR, News, OPM	DXCB	5 KW	1. It's All; 2. For You	Zamboanga City
95.5 FM	Magic 95.5	Golden Broadcast Professionals, Inc. (Quest Broadcasting)	Contemporary Hits, OPM, News, Public Affairs	DXEL	5 KW	1. Magic; 2. 95.5	Zamboanga City
96.3 FM	iFM Zamboanga	Radio Mindanao Network	Contemporary MOR, News, Talk	DXWR	5 KW	iFM IDOL	Zamboanga City
97.9 FM	Love Radio Zamboanga	MBC Media Group	Contemporary MOR, OPM	DXCM	10 KW		Zamboanga City
99.5 FM	XFM Zamboanga	Global Satellite Technology Services (operated by Yes2Health Advertising Inc.)	Contemporary MOR, News, Talk	DXLA	10 KW	99.5 XFM	Zamboanga City
102.7 FM	Yes FM Zamboanga	Cebu Broadcasting Company (MBC Media Group)	contemporary MOR, OPM	DXHT	10 KW		Zamboanga City
103.5 FM	Halo-Halo Radio Zamboanga	Ultimate Entertainment (Viva Communications)	OPM	DXUE	10 KW		Zamboanga City
105.1 FM	Juander Radyo Zamboanga	Rizal Memorial Colleges Broadcasting Corporation (operated by RSV Broadcasting Network)	Contemporary MOR, News, Talk	DXCZ	10 KW		Zamboanga City
105.9 FM	eMedia News FM	Westwind Broadcasting Corporation (operated by eMedia Production Network)	News, Public Affairs, Talk	DXWW	10 KW		Zamboanga City
106.7 FM	Marino News FM	Zamboanga State College of Marine Sciences and Technology (Philippine Broadcasting Service)	Campus radio, News, Public Affairs, Talk	DXCP	10 KW	ZSCMST	Zamboanga City
107.5 FM	Max FM Zamboanga	Rizal Memorial Colleges Broadcasting Corporation (operated by Christian Media Management)	Contemporary MOR, News, Talk	DXCZ	10 KW		Zamboanga City

== Zamboanga del Norte ==
=== AM stations ===
Frequency	Name	Company	Format	Call Sign	Power	Location Covered
981 AM	RMN Dipolog	Radio Mindanao Network	News, Talk, Public Affairs	DXDR	5 KW	Dipolog, Dapitan
1053 AM	Radyo Ronda Dipolog	Radio Philippines Network	News, Public Affairs, Talk	DXKD	1 KW	Dipolog, Dapitan

=== FM stations ===
Frequency	Name	Company	Format	Call Sign	Power	Location Covered
88.1 FM	Unbox Radio	Subic Broadcasting Corporation	Adult Top 40, OPM	DXDA	5 KW	Dipolog
88.9 FM	First Love Radio	First Love Broadcasting Network, Inc.	Community radio, Adult Contemporary, OPM, Pop	DXFL	5 KW	Dipolog
89.9 FM	Jose Rizal Radio	Mindanao Broadcasting Network	Contemporary MOR, OPM	DXJR	5 KW	Dapitan
90.7 FM	Energy FM Sindangan	Ultrasonic Broadcasting System	Contemporary MOR, OPM	—N/a	5 KW	Sindangan
90.9 FM	Magik FM Dipolog	Century Broadcasting Network	Contemporary MOR, OPM, News	DXKW	5 KW	Dipolog
91.7 FM	Radyo Rapido Dipolog	Kalayaan Broadcasting System, Inc.	News, Talk, Public Affairs	DXRG	5 kW	Dipolog
92.5 FM	DXAA	Andres Bonifacio College Broadcasting System	College radio	DXAA	5 KW	Dipolog
93.3 FM	Star FM Dipolog	People's Broadcasting Service (Bombo Radyo Philippines)	Adult Contemporary, OPM, Pop, News	DXFB	5 KW	Dipolog
94.1 FM	RMN Dipolog	Radio Mindanao Network	News/Talk	DXZZ	5 KW	Dipolog
94.5 FM	Radyo Natin Sindangan	Radyo Natin Network (MBC Media Group)	community radio	DXXE	1 KW	Sindangan
95.3 FM	Triple Singko Sindangan	Triple Singko Network and Data Solution Corp.	Contemporary MOR, OPM	DXPR	5 KW	Sindangan
95.9 FM	Radyo Sincero Dipolog	Times Broadcasting Network Corporation (operated by Bisdak Media Group)	Contemporary MOR, News, Talk	DXAQ	5 KW	Dipolog
96.5 FM	B 96.5	PEC Broadcasting Corporation	Contemporary MOR, News, Talk	DXEB	5 KW	Labason
96.7 FM	Gold FM Sindangan	Kalayaan Broadcasting System, Inc.	Contemporary MOR, OPM	DXSR	5 kW	Sindangan
96.9 FM	Radyo Kahupayan	National Nutrition Council (Nutriskwela Community Radio), operated by the Municipal Government of Siayan	Community radio	DXNK	0.5 KW	Siayan
97.5 FM	Juander Radyo Dipolog	Malindang Broadcasting Network Corporation (operated by RSV Broadcasting Network)	Contemporary MOR, News, Talk	—N/a	5 kW	Dipolog
97.7 FM	RCFM Radyo Alerto Sindangan	Mindanao Broadcasting Network	Contemporary MOR, OPM	DXSZ	5 KW	Sindangan
98.1 FM	Infinite Radio Dipolog	St. Jude Thaddeus Institute of Technology	Contemporary MOR, News, Talk	DXEW	5 kW	Dipolog
99.7 FM	Chat Radio	Feelcon Mass Media Broadcasting Services	Contemporary MOR, News, Talk		5 KW	Dipolog
100.5 FM	Radyo Natin Dipolog	Radyo Natin Network (MBC Media Group)	Community radio, Music	DXBD	5 KW	Dipolog
101.1 FM	Barangay Radio	Barangay Radio Information Center	Contemporary MOR, OPM, News/Talk	—N/a	5 KW	Dipolog
102.1 FM	RJ Super FM Liloy	First Love Broadcasting Network, Inc.	Community radio, Adult Contemporary, OPM, Pop	DXRJ	5 kW	Liloy
102.5 FM	Like Radio Sindangan	Capitol Broadcasting Center	Contemporary MOR, News, Talk	—N/a	5 KW	Sindangan
103.7 FM	Energy FM Dipolog	Ultrasonic Broadcasting System	Contemporary MOR, OPM	DXLJ	5 KW	Dipolog
104.5 FM	Radyo Bibo	Sagay Broadcasting Corporation	Contemporary MOR, News, Talk	—N/a	5 KW	Dapitan
105.3 FM	XFM Dipolog	Rizal Memorial Colleges Broadcasting Corporation (operated by Y2H Broadcasting Network)	Contemporary MOR, News, Talk	DXWY	5 kW	Dipolog
106.1 FM	Babe Radio (FMR Dipolog)	Philippine Collective Media Corporation	Contemporary MOR, News, Talk	—N/a	5 kW	Dipolog
107.7 FM	Brigada News FM Dipolog	Baycomms Broadcasting Corporation (Brigada Mass Media Corporation)	Contemporary MOR, OPM, News, Talk	DXIO	5 kW	Dipolog

== Zamboanga del Sur ==
=== AM stations ===
Frequency	Name	Company	Format	Call Sign	Power	Location Covered
603 AM	RMN Pagadian	Radio Mindanao Network	Drama, News, Public Affairs, Talk	DXPR	5 KW	Pagadian
756 AM	Radyo Bagting	Baganian Broadcasting Corporation	Drama, News, Public Affairs, Talk	DXBZ	5 KW	Pagadian
1377 AM	Radyo Ronda Pagadian	Radio Philippines Network	drama, news, public affairs, talk	DXKP	5 KW	Pagadian

=== FM stations ===
Frequency	Name	Company	Format	Call Sign	Power	Location Covered
88.1 FM	Infinite Radio Aurora	St. Jude Thaddeus Institute of Technology	Contemporary MOR, News, Talk	DXAC-FM	5 KW	Aurora
88.7 FM	Nonglading Radio Molave	Nonglading Broadcasting Services	Contemporary MOR, News, Talk		5 KW	Molave
89.5 FM	XFM Pagadian	Rizal Memorial Colleges Broadcasting Corporation (operated by Y2H Broadcasting Network)	Contemporary MOR, News, Talk	—N/a	5 KW	Pagadian
90.3 FM	Nonglading Radio Pagadian	Nonglading Broadcasting Services (operated by Kalayaan Broadcasting System)	Contemporary MOR, News, Talk		5 KW	Pagadian
91.1 FM	Voice Radio	Kaissar Broadcasting Network	Contemporary MOR, OPM	DXKV	1 KW	Pagadian
91.3 FM	Radyo Natin Margosatubig	MBC Media Group	community radio	DXRH	1 KW	Margosatubig
91.9 FM	Radyo Natin Pagadian	MBC Media Group	community radio	DXMD	5 KW	Pagadian
94.1 FM	Radio One Pagadian	MIT Radio-TV Network	Contemporary MOR, News, Talk	DXLN	5 KW	Pagadian
95.7 FM	Radyo Natin Molave	Pacific Broadcasting System (MBC Media Group)	Community radio	DXWE	0.5 KW	Molave
96.7 FM	iFM Pagadian	Radio Mindanao Network	Contemporary MOR, OPM	DXWD	5 KW	Pagadian
98.3 FM	Energy FM Pagadian	Ultrasonic Broadcasting System	Contemporary MOR, OPM	DXUA	5 KW	Pagadian
99.9 FM	Radyo Sincero Pagadian	Times Broadcasting Network Corporation (operated by ABJ Broadcasting Services)	Contemporary MOR, News, Talk	DXWO	5 KW	Pagadian
101.5 FM	DXID 101.5	Association for Islamic Development Service Cooperative	Islam, Community radio, Talk	DXID	5 kW	Pagadian
102.1 FM	Like Radio Molave	Capitol Broadcasting Center	Contemporary MOR, News, Talk	DXJV	1 KW	Molave
103.1 FM	Radyo Kidlat Zamsureco-I	Zamboanga del Sur I Electric Cooperative (Presidential Broadcast Service)	Music, News, Public Affairs, Talk,	DXPY	1 KW	Pagadian
103.9 FM	LCM FM Pagadian	Subic Broadcasting Corporation	Religious	DXLP	5 KW	Pagadian
104.5 FM	Radyo Kaugmaran	National Nutrition Council (Nutriskwela Community Radio), operated by the Municipal Government of Aurora	community radio	DXNJ	0.5 KW	Aurora
104.7 FM	Juander Radyo Pagadian	Malindang Broadcasting Network Corporation (operated by RSV Broadcasting Network)	Contemporary MOR, OPM, News, Talk	DXMB-FM	5 kW	Pagadian
105.3 FM	Radyo Sincero Molave	ABJ Broadcasting Services	Contemporary MOR, News, Talk		5 KW	Molave
105.7 FM	Brigada News FM Pagadian	Baycomms Broadcasting Corporation (Brigada Mass Media Corporation)	Contemporary MOR, OPM, News, Talk	DXVV	5 KW	Pagadian
106.3 FM	Bell FM	Baganian Broadcasting Corporation	Contemporary MOR, News, Talk	DXCA	5 KW	Pagadian
106.9 FM	MRadio Radyo Pilipinas	Municipal Government of Molave (Presidential Broadcast Service)	News, Public Affairs, Talk	DXPB	1 KW	Molave

== Zamboanga Sibugay ==
=== FM stations ===
Frequency	Name	Company	Format	Call Sign	Power	Location Covered
88.7 FM	Radyo Sincero Ipil	Times Broadcasting Network Corporation (operated by ABJ Broadcasting Services)	contemporary MOR, news, talk	DXMG	5 kW	Ipil
92.7 FM	XFM Ipil	Y2H Broadcasting Network, Inc.	Contemporary MOR, News, Talk	DXCW	5 KW	Ipil
93.5 FM	Juander Radyo Ipil	Malindang Broadcasting Network Corporation (operated by RSV Broadcasting Network)	contemporary MOR, news, talk	—N/a	5 kW	Ipil
95.3 FM	Radyo Natin Ipil	Radyo Natin Network (MBC Media Group)	Community radio, Music	DXDS	5 kW	Ipil
96.7 FM	Easy Radio	S and J Primier Company	Contemporary MOR, OPM	DXER	—N/a	[Alicia, Zamboanga Sibugay]
98.5 FM	Radyo Kasuhnan	National Nutrition Council (Nutriskwela Community Radio)	Community radio	DXNC	1 kW	Siay
99.3 FM	FMR Zamboanga Sibugay	Philippine Collective Media Corporation	contemporary MOR, news, talk	—N/a	5 kW	Ipil
100.9 FM	Brigada News FM Ipil	Brigada Mass Media Corporation (Baycomms Broadcasting Corporation)	Contemporary MOR, OPM, News, Talk	—N/a	5 kW	Ipil
103.1 FM	Magic 103	Westwind Broadcasting Corporation (operated by eMedia Production Network)	Contemporary MOR, OPM, News, Talk	DXKT	5 kW	Titay
