= Media in Zamboanga City =

Zamboanga City media outlets

This is a list of notable media outlets in Zamboanga City, a city in the Zamboanga Peninsula administrative region of the Philippines. Although geographically separated, and an independent and chartered city, Zamboanga City is grouped with the province of Zamboanga del Sur for statistical purposes, yet governed independently from it.

== Television and cable stations ==
=== Analog ===
- (PA) – Channel 3 (ABS CBN SA ALLTV2 Zamboanga; operated by Advanced Media Broadcasting System (AMBS), formerly operated by GMA Network from 1976 to 1995 and ABS-CBN Corporation from 1995 to 2020)
- DXXX-TV – Channel 5 (RPN Zamboanga/Nine Media Corporation-RPTV Zamboanga)
- DXVC-TV – Channel 7 (People's Television Zamboanga)
- DXLA-TV – Channel 9 (GMA Zamboanga; formerly operated by First United Broadcasting Corporation, a former ABS-CBN affiliate)
- DXGB-TV - Channel 11 (Golden Broadcast Professionals, Inc., also an affiliated with TV5 Zamboanga & DXDE-TV 29 Zamboanga)
- DXZB-TV – Channel 13 (affiliate station of IBC Zamboanga (Defunct)
- Mindanao Examiner TV Zamboanga – Channel 19 in Zamboanga and Pagadian cities
- DXVB-TV – Channel 21 (GTV Zamboanga; operated by Citynet Network Marketing and Productions, Inc.)
- DXGA-TV – Channel 25 Hope Channel Zamboanga (Defunct)
- DXJP-TV – Channel 27 SolarFlix Zamboanga (Defunct)
- DXDE-TV – Channel 29 One Sports
- DXBE-TV – Channel 31 BEAM TV Zamboanga (Defunct)
- DXMZ-TV - Channel 33 TV5 Zamboanga (Defunct)
- DXNZ-TV – Channel 37 UNTV Zamboanga (Defunct)
- SMNI Zamboanga – Channel 39 (relay of SMNI-43 Davao) (Defunct)
- DXNJ-TV – Channel 41 (RJTV Zamboanga) (Defunct) now used by GMA Zamboanga DTT-41 (635.143 MHz).
- GNN Western Mindanao – Channel 43 (Defunct)
- DXGP-TV – Channel 45 (GMA Zamboanga)
- DXMR-TV – Channel 53 (Islam TV Zamboanga)

=== Digital ===
- DXMZ-DTV - Channel 18 (497.143 MHz) TV5 Zamboanga (Pending)
- DXZM-DTV - Channel 20 (509.143 MHz) A2Z Zamboanga (Pending)
- DXHT-DTV - Channel 24 (533.143 MHz) DZRH News Television Zamboanga (Pending)
- DXJP-DTV - Channel 27 (551.143 MHz) SolarFlix Zamboanga (Pending)
- DXBE-DTV – Channel 31 (575.143 MHz) (BEAM TV Zamboanga)
- DXAX-DTV – Channel 40 (629.143 MHz) (eMedia Digital TV) (now migrated and became the first digital TV channel in Zamboanga Region)
- DXLA-DTV – Channel 41 (635.143 MHz) (GMA Zamboanga)
- DXNJ-DTV – Channel 42 (641.143 MHz) (RJ DigiTV Zamboanga) (Pending)
- DXGB-DTV – Channel 51 (695.143 MHz) Golden Broadcast Professionals, Inc. also an affiliated with TV5 Zamboanga

=== Cable and satellite providers ===
- Sky Cable Zamboanga
- Mindanao Cable TV
- Margos Cable Vision
- Cignal TV
- G Sat
- Converge FiberX
- GoWiser Fiber

== Production houses ==
- Mindanao Examiner – Regional Newspaper / Video Productions / Internet Broadcast News / News Podcast (Also provides photography services, private and corporate media consultancy)

== Radio stations ==
- MBC Media Group
  - DXZH-855 DZRH Zamboanga (relay station from Manila)
  - DXCM-97.9 Love Radio
  - DXHT-102.7 Yes! FM
- Brigada Mass Media Corporation
  - DXZB-89.9 Brigada News FM
- Bombo Radyo Philippines (People's Broadcasting Service, Inc.)
  - DXCB-93.9 Star FM
- Golden Broadcast Professionals, Inc.
  - DXEL Magic 95.5 (affiliate station of Quest Broadcasting Inc., on air since May 1, 2000)
- Radio Mindanao Network
  - DXRZ-900 RMN Zamboanga
  - DXWR-96.3 Radyo iFM
- Radio Philippines Network
  - DXXX-1008 Radyo Ronda
- RT Broadcast Specialists
  - DXLL-1044/DXKZ-91.5 Mango Radio Zamboanga (relay stations from Davao)
- Far East Broadcasting Company
  - DXAS-1116 Your Community Radio
- Presidential Broadcast Service
  - DXMR-1170 Radyo Pilipinas
- Catholic Media Network
  - DXVP-1467 El Radyo Verdadero
- Viva Entertainment
  - DXUE-103.5 Halo-Halo Radio
- eMedia Productions / Westwind Broadcasting Corporation
  - DXWW-105.9 eMedia News FM
- Zamboanga State College of Marine Sciences and Technology
  - DXCP-106.7 Marino News FM
- Armed Forces of the Philippines - Civil Relations Service
  - DXWC-88.3 Peace FM
- Global Satellite Technology Services / Yes2Health Advertising, Inc. (Y2H Broadcasting Network, Inc.)
  - DXLA-99.5 XFM Zamboanga
- Rizal Memorial Colleges Broadcasting Corporation / RSV Broadcasting Network
  - 105.1 Juander Radyo Zamboanga
- 5K Broadcasting Network, Inc. / Fairwaves Broadcasting Network
  - 89.1 K5 News FM Zamboanga

== News programs ==
- TV Patrol Chavacano (first broadcast started in 1995 as TV Patrol Zamboanga until 2000 when the newscast changed its current name and final broadcast aired in 2020)
- Buenos Días Zamboanga (Zamboanga morning show opt-out of Umagang Kay Ganda from 2019 until 2020)
- One Mindanao (simulcast on GMA 5 Davao)
- At Home with GMA Regional TV (simulcast on GMA 5 Davao; first broadcast started in 2020 and final broadcast aired in 2024)
