= List of programs broadcast by DZRH/DZRH News Television =

These are the programs that have been currently aired on DZRH and through its TeleRadyo channel DZRH News Television.

== Current programs ==
=== News ===
- ACS Balita (2013)
- Balitang Promdi (2018)
- DZRH Flash Report (up-to-the-minute breaking news, 1991)
- DZRH Boom Balita (2006–13, 2024)
- DZRH Special Coverage (live/special coverages, 1991)
- For Tonight Only (2018)
- MBC TV Network News (2024)
- Mega Balita Linggo (2021)
- RH Balita (2011)
  - RH Balita Hourly Updates
  - RH Balita (Weekday afternoon edition)
  - RH Balita @ 4 am (Saturday edition)
  - RH Balita Weekend @ 12 nn
- Sunday Updates (2018)
- TNT: Tomorrow's News Tonight (2006–07, 2017)

=== General commentary ===
- Damdaming Bayan (1991)
- DZRH Balansyado (2022)
- DZRH Breaktime (2014)
  - DILG sa DZRH Breaktime (2022–23, 2023)
- Dos por Dos (2020)
- Executive Session (2014)
- Isyung Pambayan (2019)
- Magandang Umaga Pilipinas (2011)
- Maynila, ito ang Pilipinas (2000–02, 2011)
- SOS: Special on Saturday (2012)
  - #ECCWorkRelated sa Special on Saturday (2019–21, 2023)
- Usapang Legal (2024)

=== Talk ===
- DZRH Stories: Pinoy Documentaries (2022)
- Huntahan (2019)
- Kaya mo Yan! (2019)
- KKK (2018, 2021 as Kaalaman at Kabuhayan)
- May Trabaho (2014)
- Radyo Henyo (2012)
- Sapol Sabado (2018)
- Tambayan (2015)

=== Public service ===
- Adbokasiya (2013–16, 2021)
- Aksyon Kababaihan (2016)
- Agri Asenso (2021)
- Diskarte (With CCP) (2015)
- DZRH Operation Tulong (1978)
- Radyo Balintataw: Talakayan (1967)
- Public Service Hour (2021)

=== Health ===
- Ang Galing Mo, Doc! (2007)
- DZRH Health Check Plus (2020)
- Lunas (2007)
  - Lunas Extension (2007)
  - Lunas Sunday Edition (2007)
- The Secret of Health (2024)

=== Infotainment and Lifestyle ===
- Art2Art (2007–21, 2023)
- Bisaya Time (2018)
- Dear Ate Raquel (2018)
- Gabi ng Bading (2016)
- Gabi ng Misteryo (2022)
- Hanap Buhay Diaries (2025)
- Spotlight with Sister L (2025)
- Showbiz Talk with Morly Alinio (2003)
- Showbiz Talk Ganern (2016)
- Tita EM's Magazine (2016)

=== Music ===
- Music automation (2025)

=== Drama ===
These programs can only be heard on DZRH radio.

- Gabi ng Lagim (1957)
- Hukumang Pantahanan (2021)
- Ikaw Lamang sa Buhay Ko: Love Story (2022)
- Ito ang Aking Buhay (2021)
- Kuwento and Awit (2023)
- Mga Ginintuang Kasaysayan (2021)
- May Pangako Ang Bukas (2000)
- Radyo Balintataw (1967)
- Sa Kanyang Panahon... (2016)

=== Religious ===
- Ang Banal na Orasyon (2018)
- ACS Sunday Mass (2020)
- Kapanalig sa DZRH (2013)
- Panalangin Para sa Dakilang Awa (2018)
- Tinig ng Pagasa (Voice of Prophecy) (2000s)

=== DZRH News Television-produced ===
- Alamin na This (2021)
- EO: Experts Opinion (2013–19, 2019–21, 2023)
- Hoy Bawal Yan (2024)
- Match Point (2023)
- SceneZone (2023)
- Sa Likod ng Kontrobersya (2023)
- The Better News (2019–20, 2021)
- TNVS: Trending 'N Viral Show (2018–19, 2021)
- WPS: West Philippine Sea (2024)

=== Non-produced ===
- MX3 Prayer Watch: Oras ng Panalangin (produced by DMI-MX3)
- NHK World-Japan on DZRH-TV (2013–20; 2022, DZRH News Television only)

== Previous programs ==
=== DZRH ===
- 24 Oras[1973−2004](radio drama)
- A Better Life (2012)
- Abot Kamay (2008–11)
- Adventures of Zimatar[1973−1999](radio drama)
- Agritech (1996–2012)
- Aksyon, Tulong, Solusyon (2023)
- Ala-ala Kita with Mr. Romantiko (2020–23)
- Alas-6 En Punto (2016–17)
- Angelo Palmones Live (2018–19)
- Ani at Kita (2019–20)
- Ano ang Katotohanan? (2019–23)
- Ang Bagong Bituin/Showbiz Balita/Ooola, Chika! Now Na! (1997–2013)
- Ang Dating Daan (1998–2013)
- Ang Lahat ay May Pag-Asa[1973−2015](radio drama) (2004–2008)
- Ang Taong Di Ko Malilimot (radio drama)
- Atras-Abante (radio drama)
- Arangkada Balita (Mondays–Fridays) (2012–15)
- Arangkada Balita Weekend (Saturdays–Sundays) (2012–15)
- Ask my Pope (2019)
- Atin-Atin Lamang
- Balita RH Agad (2017)
- Balitang Bayan Numero Uno (1987–2011)
  - Balitang Bayan Numero Uno Saturday Edition (2000–2012)
  - Balitang Bayan Numero Uno Sunday Edition (2000–2012)
  - Balitang Bayan in Action (2000–02)
- Bangon Balita (2011–12)
- Barangay RH
- Barangay Numero Uno (2000–02)
- Bata, Bida Ka (2013–14)
- Batas 101 (2012–14)
- Batas Barangay (2008–11)
- Bayan Kontra Droga (2010–11)
- Bayan Kontra Smuggling (2011)
- Big News
- Big News Nightly
- Big News sa Tanghali
- Big News sa Umaga
- Bimbo (radio drama)
- Bisalog (2008–11)
- Bisaya Time: Saturday Edition (2020)
- Biyaheng Bukid sa DZRH (2015–19)
- Biyaheng RH (2013–19)
- Boses ng Kabataan (2016–20)
- Boses ng Masa (2008–11)
- Cine Parade (5-minute previews of local movie releases)
- Cinema News (5-minute entertainment news summary)
- Coffee Break (2018–20)
- COVID-19 Special Coverage: The DZRH Special Coverage (2020)
- Daily Balita (2000–02)
- Damdaming Bayan Linggo (2000–02)
- Damdaming Bayan Sabado (2008–13)
- Dear PhilHealth (2004–11)
- Defense Corner (2008–14)
- Doc Willie and Liza Live (2011)
- DZRH Alas-Kuwarto Balita (2018–19)
- DZRH Balita (2004–08)
- DZRH Balita Alas-Kwatro (2011)
- DZRH Balita Alas-Sais (2008–11)
- DZRH COMELEC Hour (2021–22)
- DZRH Concierto (2010–12)
- DZRH Community Hotline (2020–23)
- DZRH Evening News (2018–20)
- DZRH Hataw (2011)
- DZRH Headlines (2004–11)
- DZRH Headline Balita (2004–11)
- DZRH Love Chat (2002–07, 2011–12)
- DZRH Nationwide Balita (2008–11)
- DZRH Network News (2018–20)
- DZRH Newscenter Balita (2000–08)
- DZRH News Headlines (2018)
- DZRH Radioke (2008–10)
- DZRH Senior Moments (2019–22)
- DZRH Unang Balita
- DZRH with Love (2017–25)
- Doctors on Call (2012–14)
- Doktor ng Masa (2013–14)
- DOH Health Agenda (2018–19)
- DOST: Agham Para sa Bayan (2017–18)
- Dolorosa 1973−2015 (radio drama)
- Dr. Ramon Selga (radio drama)
- Dulaan ng Darigold (radio drama)
- Espesyal na Balita (2000–08)
- Espesyal na Balita ang Karugtong (2000–02)
- Eveready News (2000–02)
- expreSSS sa Breaktime (2021–22)
- Eye in the Sky (2000–02)
- Familia Tikoy (1960) (radio drama)
- Farm to Market (2020–21)
- For Lovers Only with Manny Bal (1986–2013)
- Gabay ng Kalusugan (2012)
- Gerry De Leon Presents....
- Get Up Lahat
- Go Negosyo sa DZRH (2013–19)
- Gulong ng Palad (1949–56) (radio drama)
- Gumising Sa Pagsikat ng Araw
- Gloco Hollywood Jamboree
- Happy Hour (2019–20)
- Haranang Pilipino (2000–02)
- Health Station DZRH (2008–11, 2018–20)
- Higit na Dakila (radio drama)
- Hinding Hindi Ko Malilimutan (radio drama)
- I-Push Natin! (2015)
- Ipaalam Kay GM (2019–21)
- Ireklamo kay Greco (2017–19)
- Isinakdal Ko Ang Aking Ina (1967-1991) (radio drama)
- Isigaw Sa Langit (radio drama)
- Iskor Ko ‘To (2004–08)
- Isyu (2011–19)
- Ito ang Inyong Lingkod, Tiya Dely (2000–02)
- Ito ang Palad Ko!(Classic series) (1967–2020)
- Jesus Miracle Crusade
- Jeep ni Erap (1998–2001)
- Juan on Juan (2000–02)
- KNAT: Karinderya ni Aling Terya (radio comedy)
- Ka-Kwentuhan Karen (2020)
- Ka-Vendor (2023–24)
- Kaligtasan (2012)
- Kalikasan, Kaunlaran (2008–11)
- Kalinga at Patnubay (2004–08)
- Kambal Kamao (radio drama)
- Kanya Kanyang Problema (2023–25)
- Kapag Langit ang Humatol (radio drama)
- Kasangga (2000–02)
- Kasaysayan sa Mga Liham kay Tiya Dely (radio drama) (1953–2008)
- Kapitang Pinoy (radio drama)
- Katumbas ay Biyaya (radio drama) (2013–20)
- Katuwaan sa DZRH
- Kiyeme Kiyemeng Balita (2015)
- Kontra Smuggling (2008–10)
- Kulang sa Pito[1973−1991](radio drama)
- Laging Tagumpay (2004–08)
- Landbank (2008–11)
- Lola Sela Bunggangera (radio drama) (2010–11)
- Lolo Jose[1967−2015](radio drama)
- Lingkod Bayan ni Mang Porong (2000–08)
- Lingkod Bayan (2007–20)
- Liberty in Action (1985–91)
- LPK: Laban Para sa Karapatan (2015)
- Luhang Tagumpay[1967−2015](radio drama)
- Lunas sa Hapon (2008–09)
- LVN Perla Musikal
- Macho Papa: Ang Super Herong Bonggang Bongga1980−1991(radio drama)
- Magandang Umaga, Pilipinas Sabado (2012–14)
- Mag-Usap Tayo! (2012–20)
- Makabagong Bayanihan (2017–19)
- Mang Kiko (radio drama)
- Maria Gracia (radio drama)
- Matud Nila (radio drama)
- Manila Afternoon Delight (2012–15)
- Mandirigma sa Kawang Gawa (2018–19)
- May Bagong Pag-asa (2012–14, 2017)
- MBC Musicale
- MBC Network Center (2014)
- MBC Sports Center (1999–2016)
- Metro Manila Ngayon (2016, 2021–22)
- Meralco Hour
- Mga Alaala at Paalaala ni Mr. Senior Citizen (2015–18)
- Mga Balita Ngayon (2000–02)
- Mga Kwento ni Lola Basyang (radio drama)
- Midnight Special (2017)
- Midnight Trio (2017)
- Misa sa Veritas on DZRH (2020)
- Misteryo (2008–11)
- Modern Romances (radio drama)
- Mr. Recordman
- Mr. Romantiko (1999–2022)
- Mundo Man ay Magunaw[1973−2015](radio drama)
- Musika, Atbp. (2014)
- National Radio Pulpit
- Negra Bandida
- Negosyo Atbp. (2013–23)
- Night Life with Sister L (2021–25)
- Obra Maestra (radio drama)
- One on One with Milky Rigonan and Raymond Dadpaas (2018–19)
- One on One with Mar Roxas (2000–02)
- Operation Tulong News (2000–08)
- Operation Tulong: Saturday Edition (2013–14)
- Operation Tulong: Sunday Edition (2012–14)
- Pangga Ruth Abao Live! (2008–12)
- Pangunahing Balita (2008–22)
- Panalo ang Mamamayan!
- Parada Balita Linggo (2011–12)
- Paradang Pang-almusal
- Parada ng Sikat
- PBA on DZRH (1994–2002)
- PCSO Panalo sa Kawang Gawa (2018–19)
- PCSO Hour Kawanggawa (2019)
- Peace on Air (2014)
- Pimentel Hour (2016–19)
- Pira-pirasong Pangarap (radio drama) (1982–97)
- Pulso Balita Sabado (2015)
- Pulso ng Pilipino (2004–11)
- Radyo Clinica (2010–11)
- Radyo Harana (2011–12)
- Radyo Harana at Iba Pa (2012)
- Radyo Hataw (the TV Adaptation of the radio program DZRH Hataw) (1999–2011)
- Rapido Hataw Alas-6 (2015)
- Rekta: Agenda ng Masa (2024)
- Review (2014–22)
- Reyna ng Vicks
- RH Balita @ 3 pm (2012–18)
- RH Balita @ 4 am (2018–22)
- RH Balita @ 4 pm (2012–17)
- RH Balita @ 5 am (2017–18, 2018–20)
- RH Balita @ 5 pm (2015)
- RH Balita @ 5:30 pm (2013)
- RH Balita @ 6 pm (2011–13)
- RH Balita @ 6:30 am (2017–18)
- RH Balita @ 7 pm (2014–15)
- RH Balita @ 9 pm (2011–16)
- RH Balita @ 9:30 am (2014)
- RH Balita @ 11 pm (2013)
- RH Balita @ 11:30 am (2012)
- RH Balita @ 12 nn (2012–17)
- RH Balita: Saturday Edition (2018–20, 2021–22, 2024)
- RH Ratsada Balita (2014)
- Sa Ngalan ng Pag-Ibig[1973 2015](radio drama)
- Sagot sa Bayan (2011–12, 2014)
- Sampagita's Stardust Show
- Saturday Updates (2018–21)
- Sementadong Gubat (1973–2009)
- Serbisyong Bayan (2008–12)
- Sesyon (2010–11)
- Serenata Filipina (2008–12)
- Serenata with Didi Magpayo (2008–10)
- Serenatang Kumbidahan (2004–08)
- SEX: Showbiz and Entertainment Xpress (2012–14)
- Shortime (2000–02, 2013–17)
- Showbiz with Julie Fe Navarro (1987–2003)
- Showbiz Tsismis (1998–2000)
- Sigaw ng Budhi[1966—1992](radio drama)
- Sonny in the Morning with Kisses (2011–13)
- Straight from the Shoulder (1966–94)
- Sugpuin ang Korupsyon (radio drama) (1967–2015)
- Sulong Pilipinas (2019–20)
- Sunday Good Vibes (2017)
- Sunday Light Moment (2015–17)
- Sunday Love Chill (2014)
- Sunday Vibes (2018)
- Tambalang Balasubas at Balahura sa DZRH (2012–15)
- Tambalang KJ (2018–20)
- Tambayan Extension (2018–20)
- Tambayan Sessions (2018–20)
- Tapatan ni Jay Sonza (2000–02)
- Tara Peeps (2021–23)
- Tayo'y Mag-aliw
- Teenage Rage
- The Situation Report (2025)
- Tinig ng Bayani (2008–10)
- Tinig ng Mamayanan (2004–08, 2010–11)
- To Saudi with Love (1967–91) (radio drama)
- Todo Balita Ngayon
- Tonight with Sonny Casulla and Liezel Once (2016–18)
- Tuloy-Tuloy Pinoy (2008–11)
- Ukay-Ukay ni Manang Kikay (radio drama)
- Unilab Balita (2008–11)
- Urbi et Orbi Blessing from the Pope (2020)
- Usapang Batas/Batas at Balita (2011–14)
- Usapang Maritime (2011)
- Usapang OFW (2000–08)
- Usapang SSS (2022–23)
- Veronica (radio drama)
- Walang Kukurap (radio drama) (1967–2015)
- Yan ang DZRH News (2017–19)

=== RHTV/DZRH News Television/DZRH TV ===
- #ALCUGames2019: Laro ng Pag-asa ng Bayan
- Aksyon Bantay OFW (2018–19)
- Beauty and the Best (2018–19)
- Biyahe TV (2008–15)
- BFF: Beauty, Fun & Fashion (2008–11, 2020–21)
- Desisyon 2019: DZRH Election Education (2018–19)
- DOH: Department of Help (2009–17)
- DZRH Correspondents (2021)
- DZRH Icons (2008–15)
- DZRH Showbiz Spotted (2020–21)
- Game Now (2008–15)
- HR: Highly Recommended (2008–15)
- I-Report: DZRH Interviews (2019)
- Kumpletos Rekados: Pera Pera lang yan (2008–15)
- Kumpletos Rekados: Usapang Batas (2008–15)
- Legally Yours (2008–15)
- LM: Legal Minds (2013–18, 2019–21)
- MBC Network News (2013–18, 2020–24)
- MIB: Mga Imbentor ng Bayan (2008–15)
- Mocha Uson Blog: Boses Ng Ordinaryong Pilipino (2017)
- NYK: Now You Know! (2008–11)
- Operation Tulong sa RHTV (2008–12)
- PCSO Lottery Draw
- Pasikatin Na Yan (2020–21)
- Pinoy Health and Wellness (2013–19, 2020–21)
- Point of View (2008–15)
- Pricetag (2008–15)
- RHTV Balita Express (2008–12)
- RH Balita: Sunday Edition (2018–19)
- Riding in Tandem: Malayang Pananaw (2008–15)
- Sales Ladies (2008–15)
- Sagot sa Bayan: The DZRH Campaign Promise Tracker
- Sari Sari Show (2008–15)
- Seminar School Plus (2012)
- Spotted!: DZRH Showbiz News (2019)
- SMS: Social Media Stories (2018–19)
- ST: Showbiz Tsismis (2008–14)
- STL: Showbiz Tsismis Live! (2014–17)
- Secret of Success (2018–19)
- Success Secrets (2008–18)
- Success TV (2008–11)
- Tambalang Balasubas at Balahura sa RHTV (2008–12)
- Tagumpay sa Kalusugan (2008–15)
- Tipid Trip (2008–15)
- Thinking Out Loud (2008–15)
- TNT: Tips N Tricks (2021–23)
- Tsissmaxx (2008–15)
- Usapang Lalaki (2008–15)

=== Non-produced programs simulcast on DZRH News Television ===
- Panata Sa Bayan 2022: The KBP Presidential Candidates Forum (February 4, 2022)
- Pantawid ng Pag-ibig: At Home Together Concert (March 22, 2020)
- Panahon.TV (2013–19)
- Power to Unite with Elvira (2013–19, 2019–20)
- Public Briefing: #LagingHandaPH (2020–23)
- This New Life (2012–19)

== See also ==
- DZRH
- DZRH News Television
- MBC Media Group
