= DXX =

DXX may refer to:

- 520 (number), DXX in Roman numerals, a number in the 500s range
- 520 AD (DXX), a year of the Common Era
- Lac qui Parle County Airport (FAA airport code DXX), Lac qui Parle County, Minnesota, USA
- State Security Service (Uzbekistan) (DXX, Uzbek: Davlat Xavfsizlik Xizmati)
- DXX, a variant, a fork of the videogame Descent (video game)

== See also ==
- 520 (disambiguation), where "DXX" is '520' in Roman numerals
- D20 (disambiguation), where "XX" is '20' in Roman numerals
- DX10 (disambiguation), where "X" is '10' in Roman numerals
- DXXX (disambiguation)
- DX (disambiguation)
- DDX (disambiguation)
