= DXSY =

DXSY is the callsign of Times Broadcasting Network Corporation's two flagship stations in Ozamiz, Philippines:

- DXSY-AM, branded as Radyo Bantay
- DXSY-FM, branded as Radyo Bisdak
- DXSY-FM, branded as Infinite Radio Kidapawan
