= Tita Swarding =

Filipino radio broadcaster and columnist (1952–2013)

- Born: Romulo Barrameda Espeña; November 22, 1952; Manila, Philippines
- Died: May 12, 2013 (aged 60); Quezon City, Philippines
- Other names: Tita Swarding
- Occupations: Radio broadcaster, Broadcast journalist
- Known for: Ooola, Chika!

Romulo Barrameda Espeña (November 22, 1952 – May 12, 2013), known as Tita Swarding (lit. 'Aunt Swarding'), was a Filipino radio broadcaster and columnist who worked for the Manila Broadcasting Company-owned DZRH.

== Life and career ==
Tita Swarding was born on November 22, 1952, as Romulo Espeña. Swarding joined Manila Broadcasting Company-owned DZRH before it was shut down after the imposition of Martial Law on September 21, 1972.

After Martial Law, Swarding returned to DZRH and resumed his broadcasting career. Tita Swarding became the showbiz segment anchor of Balitang Bayan Numero Uno during the time of Joe Taruc and Rey Langit (later replaced by Tiya Dely Magpayo in 1992).

Tita Swarding had a Sunday afternoon program entitled DZRH Showbiz Balita, which was aired after the station moved to Pasay. Tita Swarding was also the Columnist of Pinoy Parazzi.

== Death ==
Tita Swarding died of emphysema on May 12, 2013 at the Quezon City General Hospital. He was 60. His grave was at Eternal Gardens Memorial Park in Caloocan.

== Filmography ==
=== Radio ===
- Operetang Tagpi-Tagpi (first radio appearance in defunct DZOA 1160khz owned by ABS-CBN in 1972)
- Balitang Bayan Numero Uno (Showbiz segment)
- DZRH Showbiz Balita

=== Television ===
- Seeing Stars with Joe Quirino (IBC-13)
- Actually, Yun Na! (RPN-9)
- Beauty School Plus (RPN-9)
- Magandang Umaga Po (ABS-CBN-2)
- Teysi ng Tahanan (ABS-CBN-2)
- Inside Showbiz (GMA-7)
