= Balitang Bayan Numero Uno =

Philippine weekday morning news program

- Genre: Newscast
- Running time: 2 hours (including commercials)
- Country of origin: Philippines
- Home station: DZRH
- TV adaptations: Balitang Bayan Numero Uno (RHTV)
- Hosted by: Weekday anchors Joe Taruc; Rey Sibayan; Sunday Edition anchors Andy Vital; Milky Rigonan
- Created by: Manila Broadcasting Company
- Original release: March 2, 1987 – April 20, 2011
- No. of episodes: 17,630+ estimated

Balitang Bayan Numero Uno (National News: Number One) was the flagship newscast of AM station DZRH in the Philippines. It was anchored mainly by Joe Taruc. The program was also simulcast over Radyo Natin, several Hot FM stations and RHTV nationwide.

== Anchors ==
=== Main anchor ===
- Joe Taruc (1987–2011)

=== Co-anchors ===
- Rey Langit (5am edition, 1987–1991)
- Jennifer Postigo (5am edition, 1987–1992)
- Deo Macalma (In Action edition, 1987–1992)
- Fidela "Tiya Dely" Magpayo (5am edition, 1987–1997)
- Ali Sotto (5am edition, 1997–1998)
- Jay Sonza (In Action edition, 1999–2004)
- Rey Sibayan (5am edition, 2004–2011)
- Jun Legaspi (Weekend edition, 1991–2000)
- Ruth Abao-Espinosa (Weekend edition, 2001–2004)
- Henry Uri (Weekend edition, 2004–2006)
- Milky Rigonan (5am edition, 2007–2011)
- Andy Vital (In Action edition 1996–1998; 5am edition, 1999–2004; 6am edition 2004–2011)

=== Segment anchors ===
- Nino Padilla – Ratsada Probinsya (1995–2011)
- Chino Trinidad – Sports Ngayon (1991–1998)
- Julie Fe Navarro – Balitang Bayan Showbiz Chika (1987-1991)
- Julie Bonifacio – Balitang Bayan Showbiz Chika (1991-1998)
- Tita Swarding – Balitang Bayan Showbiz Chika (1991–2011)
- Gorgy Rula – Balitang Bayan Showbiz Chika (1998–2011)
- Morly Alinio – Balitang Bayan Showbiz Chika (1998–2011)

== See also ==
- DZRH
