= MBC TV Network News =

- Title card
- Also known as: MBC Network News (2013–2018, 2020–2024); DZRH Network News (2018–2020)
- Genre: Newscast; Live action
- Created by: MBC Media Group
- Developed by: DZRH News Television
- Presented by: Karen Ow-yong; Yuel Reyes
- Narrated by: Yuel Reyes
- Country of origin: Philippines
- Original language: Tagalog
- No. of episodes: N/A (airs daily)

Production
- Executive producers: Yuel Reyes; Millie Borja; Arnold Herrera
- Production locations: MBC Studios, CCP Complex, Pasay; Design Center of the Philippines, CCP Complex, Pasay
- Running time: 60 minutes
- Production company: MBC Media Group

Original release
- Network: RHTV/DZRH News Television/DZRH TV
- Release: October 7, 2013 – present

MBC TV Network News (formerly The Network NewsBreak, MBC Network News and DZRH Network News) is a Philippine television news broadcasting show broadcast by RHTV/DZRH News Television/DZRH TV. Originally anchored by Samantha Nazario, Bea Oranga and Nino Padilla, it premiered on October 7, 2013. Karen Ow-yong and Yuel Reyes currently serve as the anchors. The newscast is being simulcast on 666 kHz in Manila and DZRH provincial relay stations if the station has special coverage.

== History ==
=== The Network NewsBreak and MBC Network News (2013–2018) ===
The newscast was launched in October 2013 at the rebrand of RHTV to DZRH News Television with Samantha Nazario, Bea Oranga and Nino Padilla as an 11:00 AM newscast under the name The Network NewsBreak. They were later replaced with the quartet of the main anchor Dennis Antenor, Jr., segment anchors Sonny Casulla, Rocky and primary relief anchor Vien Dacles under the MBC Network News banner in 2014. Initially, Dacles doubled duty as a weather reporter until MBC outsourced weather forecasters from Panahon.TV in 2017.

Initially, the newscast aired on weekdays at 11:00 am and Saturdays at 10:30 am on cable as MBC Network News: Special Edition, both having an 11:30 pm audio-only encore on DZRH-AM and running a half-hour until June 16, 2017, when the weekday edition moved to the prime noon slot and expanded to an hour as a part of daytime revamps. However, the Saturday edition wasn't affected until it was axed by November 25 of that same year in favor of expanding the top-of-the-hour bulletin to Saturdays. The cable-exclusive bulletins continued until June 2019.

=== DZRH Network News (2018–2020) ===
On January 8, 2018, coinciding with programming changes on radio, the newscast was reformatted as DZRH Network News and began its simulcast on radio, replacing Rapido Hataw Balita: Alas Dose. Dennis Antenor, Jr. remained at the anchor chair with an expanded involvement from its radio reporters. He presented the headlines with emphasis on a "timeline" format, wherein each story carried timepieces depicting the time the news was announced by the station. Network promotional material tagged the newscast as having a different approach from its predecessor. Initially, DZRH-AM simulcast the full hour of the program until March 2018 when it was scaled down to a half-hour to accommodate the radio station's slate of radio dramas; the program itself reduced its run to a half-hour by July 2019.

Changes occurred in April 2018 with Vien Dacles and Sonny Casulla (who later retired and transferred to 87.9 Radyo Biñan) ending on-camera roles and adding in the new segment and relief anchors.

In October 2018, Regi Espiritu replaced Antenor, Jr., as the new anchor as the latter concentrated on his duties as continuity announcer and host of Byaheng RH.

==== MBC fire and aftermath ====
On October 2, 2019, the MBC broadcast facilities were affected by a significant fire that originated at the Star City Complex, including the studios utilized by DZRH News Television. Upon the station's temporary relocation to the BSA Twin Towers on October 4, the newscast utilized the DZRH radio booth to ensure the continuation of the broadcast until new studios for the TV simulcast would be finished. However, the programming decision opted for the arrangement to become permanent, reducing its format to a straightforward newscast when DZRH was relocated to the Design Center of the Philippines near the MBC Building on November 11, 2019.

=== MBC Network News (revival, 2020–2024) ===
On January 27, 2020, MBC revived MBC Network News albeit as a spun-off, separate newscast exclusively for DZRH News Television, while DZRH Network News remained on the air on both platforms. The former was anchored by the station's international diplomatic reporter Karen Ow-Yong and aired at 11:30-12:00 noon as a lead into the latter until March when DZRH expanded news coverage given the enhanced community quarantine in response to COVID-19. As a part of adjustments, DZRH Network News re-expanded to an hour-long noontime newscast while MBC Network News moved to a late-evening broadcast. Both editions continued airing under this arrangement until August 28, 2020.

==== Unified branding ====
On August 31, 2020, MBC Network News was relaunched and returned as DZRH's noontime news program while retiring the "DZRH Network News" brand. Its original anchor, Dennis Antenor, Jr. returned as the main presenter with Atty. Cherryl Adami-Molina, who formerly served as co-anchor for DZRH Happy Hour in the same capacity. The reformat is a result of the move of Dos por Dos and its hosts Anthony Taberna and Gerry Baja to DZRH and replacing Happy Hour at the 5:00 pm timeslot. On the same day, MBC Network News expanded to include an evening edition, anchored by Rey Sibayan and DZRH Evening News holdover Raymond Dadpaas at 6:30 pm. The late-night edition was also carried over but reformatted to concentrate exclusively on provincial reports.

Under this format, the noontime edition is broadcast from the DZRH News Television TV studio as an hour-long newscast on cable with its first half-hour simulcast on the radio (similar to its predecessor). In contrast, its evening edition is broadcast hour-long on all platforms and produced from the DZRH radio studio. The late-night edition is broadcast on all platforms in full from the RHTV studio.

==== Reverted as Noontime Newscast ====
On May 3, 2021, the late-night edition of the newscast was retitled DZRH Correspondents, still presented by Karen Ow-Yong and retained on provincial reports, even though the "MBC Network News" brand is still utilized on its headlines. Meanwhile, the evening edition was replaced by the new radio program Dos Kumpanyeras, where Atty. Cherryl Adami-Molina is one of the hosts, leaving Dennis Antenor, Jr. as the sole anchor of the noontime edition.

On January 10, 2022, the news program went on hiatus on DZRH TV due to the implementation of health protocols caused by COVID-19. It was temporarily replaced by the replay of Metro Manila Ngayon, also hosted by Antenor, Jr. The news program later resumed its broadcast a week after.

Dennis Antenor, Jr. silently left the newscast, as well as the entire network, Manila Broadcasting Company on May 24, 2022. He was replaced by Edniel Parrosa as the main anchor of the newscast.

=== MBC TV Network News (since 2024) ===
Following the rebranding of Manila Broadcasting Company as MBC Media Group on February 6, 2024, the newscast has once again been revamped and rebranded on March 4, 2024, as MBC TV Network News with Edniel Parrosa and Pamela Adriano anchoring the program.

On May 6, 2024, Karen Ow-yong and Yuel Reyes replaced Parrosa and Adriano as the main anchors of the program.

== Segments ==
- Alamin Na This – tips about anything about public documents
- MBC TV Correspondents – provincial news
- MBC TV Showbiz Spotted – entertainment news
- MBC TV Sports – sports news
- MBC TV Weather – weather forecasts
- Price Watch – market prices
- Today in Metro –Metro Manila news

== Current presenter ==
=== Main anchors ===
- RH 04 – Karen Ow-Yong
- Yuel Reyes

=== Segment anchors ===
- Millie Borja (MBC TV Sports) (also a substitute anchor for Ow-Yong)
- Angelica Cosme (MBC TV Showbiz Spotted) (also a substitute anchor for Reyes)
- Arnold Herrera (MBC TV Weather)
- Rovhic Manuel

=== Field unit reporters ===
- RH 04 – Karen Ow-Yong (Foreign Affairs beat)
- RH 05 – Val Gonzales (Police beat)
- RH 06 – Sherwin Alfaro (Southern Metro Manila)
- RH 07 – Henry Uri (Education and Office of the Vice President beat)
- RH 09 – Tina Nolasco
- RH 11 – Rey Sibayan
- RH 12 – Milky Rigonan (Congress beat)
- RH 13 – Mae Binauhan (Operation Tulong)
- RH 14 – Leth Narciso (Malacañang Palace beat)
- RH 17 – Nicole Lopez
- RH 18 – Ruel Saldico (Bicol Region)
- RH 19 – Jun Dimacutac (Central Mindanao)
- RH 23 – Edwin Duque (CAMANAVA and Quezon City)
- RH 25 – Grace Vera-Sansano (Central Luzon stringer)
- RH 27 – Noche Cacas
- RH 28 – Raymond Dadpaas (Senate beat)
- RH 30 – Eric Dastas (Batangas)
- RH 31 – Gary Libunao (Cagayan Valley reporter)
- RH 32 – Jimmy Angay-angay (Tacloban City)
- RH 33 – Benjamin Antioquia (Lucena City)
- RH 34 – Jayne Galit-Bantayan (Catarman, Northern Samar)
- RH 35 – Renz Belda (Batangas)
- RH 36 – Dennis Alipio (Laoag)
- RH 37 – Danny Cumilang (Bataan)
- RH 38 – Freddie Fajardo (Pangasinan)
- RH 39 – Aine Grace Bañaria-Bravo (Iloilo City)
- RH 40 – Jhun Suter (Deputy Davao City - also with Aksyon Radyo Davao)
- RH 41 – Romy Gonzales (Baguio)
- RH 46 – Rex Cantong (Bacolod - also with Aksyon Radyo Bacolod)
- RH 47 – Morly Alino
- RH 52 – Jun Alegre (Deputy Bicol reporter - Legazpi, Albay)
- RH 55 – Edniel Parrosa (Operation Tulong)

== Former personalities ==
=== Inaugural ===
- Niño "Bonito" Padilla
- Bea Oranga
- Samantha Nazario

=== Post-2014 ===
- Vien Dacles
- Sonny Casulla (d. January 2022)
- Shiela Edubas
- Rita Salonga
- Kristine dela Cruz
- Florante Rosales
- Victor de Guzman
- RH 03 – Regi Espiritu

=== 2020 unified branding ===
- Atty. Cherryl Adami-Molina (Noontime edition)
- RH 11 – Rey Sibayan (Evening edition)
- RH 28 – Raymond Dadpaas (Evening edition)
- RH 04 – Karen Ow-Yong (Late-night edition)
- RH 08 – Christian Maño
- RH 42 – Dennis Antenor, Jr. (Noontime edition) (now with Aliw Broadcasting Corporation)
- RH 43 – Rocky (Showbiz)
- Peache Gonzales (general assignments)
- Christhel Cuazon (weather)
- CD Argarin (former Expert's Opinion and Match Point segment presenter)
- Jecelle Fulgencio-Ricafort (general assignments)
- Elaine Apit (The Better News)
- Thea Pecho Corpuz (Mother Knows Best)
- Atty. Cherryl Adami-Molina (Hoy, Bawal 'Yan!)
- RH 54 – Mavel Arive (Operation Tulong)
- RH 55 – Edniel Parrosa
- Pamela Adriano

=== MBC TV Network News ===
- RH 54 – Mavel Arive
- RH 55 – Edniel Parrosa
- Pamela Adriano
- Rose Babiera (also a substitute anchor for Ow-Yong)
- RH 29 – Boy Gonzales (d. May 2026)

== See also ==
- DZRH News Television
- List of programs broadcast by DZRH/DZRH News Television
