= DXZB =

DXZB is the callsign used in Zamboanga City:

- DXZB-FM, an FM radio station branded as Brigada News FM
- DXZB-TV, a TV radio station branded as TV13
