= Andres Fernando =

Filipino politician and former mayor of Polo, Bulacan

Mayor of Polo, Bulacan
- In office 1940–1942
- Preceded by: Leopoldo Santiago
- Succeeded by: Feliciano Ponciano
- In office 1931–1937
- Preceded by: Barcenico Espiritu
- Succeeded by: Leopoldo Santiago

Personal details
- Occupation: Politician

Andres Fernando was a Filipino politician who served three terms as municipal mayor of Polo, Bulacan, from 1931 to 1937 and again from 1940 to 1942. Polo was the municipality from which present-day Valenzuela developed. The Andres Fernando Elementary School in Malanday, Valenzuela, bears his name.

== Political career ==
Fernando became mayor of Polo in 1931, succeeding Barcenico Espiritu. He served two consecutive terms before Leopoldo Santiago succeeded him in 1937. Fernando returned to office in 1940 and served a third term until 1942, when he was succeeded by Feliciano Ponciano.

Following Santiago's election, Fernando filed an election protest in the Court of First Instance of Bulacan on January 5, 1938. He alleged that irregularities and violations of election law had occurred in several voting precincts. Fernando later attempted to amend the protest to include additional precincts, but the trial judge admitted the amendment only as it related to a precinct already included in the original protest.

Fernando petitioned the Supreme Court of the Philippines for a writ of mandamus that would require the judge to admit the entire amended protest. On August 30, 1938, the Supreme Court denied the petition. It held that introducing additional contested precincts after the statutory filing period would delay the resolution of election disputes and disadvantage the opposing candidate. The decision addressed the procedural amendment and did not determine the merits of Fernando's allegations concerning the election.

== Legacy ==
A public elementary school in Barangay Malanday, Valenzuela, is named Andres Fernando Elementary School. The city government identifies the school as one of Malanday's landmarks.
