= DXSY-AM =

Philippine radio station

DXSY
- Ozamiz; Philippines
- Broadcast area: Misamis Occidental and surrounding areas
- Frequency: 1242 kHz
- Branding: DXSY 1242

Programming
- Languages: Cebuano, Filipino
- Format: News, Public Affairs, Talk

Ownership
- Owner: Times Broadcasting Network Corporation
- Sister stations: 96.1 Radyo Sincero

History
- First air date: 1965
- Former frequencies: 1210 kHz (1965-1978)
- Call sign meaning: Alex Velayo Sy (former owner)

Technical information
- Licensing authority: NTC
- Power: 5,000 watts

DXSY (1242 AM) is a radio station owned and operated by Times Broadcasting Network Corporation. The station's studio is located along Don Anselmo Bernad Avenue, Ozamiz.
