= DXDA =

DXDA may refer to:

- DXDA-AM, an AM radio station broadcasting in Prosperidad, branded as Radyo Agusan
- DXDA-FM, an FM radio station broadcasting in Digos, branded as Charm Radio
