= DXMG-FM =

Radyo Sincero Ipil (DXMG)
- Ipil; Philippines
- Broadcast area: Zamboanga Sibugay, parts of Zamboanga del Norte
- Frequency: 88.7 MHz
- Branding: 88.7 Radyo Sincero

Programming
- Languages: Cebuano, Filipino
- Format: Contemporary MOR, News, Talk
- Network: Radyo Sincero

Ownership
- Owner: Ipil Broadcasting News Network
- Operator: ABJ Broadcasting Services

History
- First air date: 1995
- Former names: DXMG (1995-2016); Radyo Bisdak (2016-2026)
- Call sign meaning: Mayor Generoso Sucgang (former mayor)

Technical information
- Licensing authority: NTC
- Power: 5,000 watts

DXMG (88.7 FM), broadcasting as 88.7 Radyo Sincero, is a radio station owned by Ipil Broadcasting News Network, a media outlet run by former Mayor Francisco Pontanar, and operated by ABJ Broadcasting Services. The station's studio is located in Brgy. Poblacion, Ipil, Zamboanga Sibugay.

== History ==
It was formerly a community radio station from its inception in the late 90s. On March 4, 2016, Bisdak Media Group took over the station's operations and relaunched it under the Radyo BisDak network.

On May 3, 2026, ABJ Broadcasting Services took over the station's operations and relaunched it under the Radyo Sincero network. Radyo Sincero used to broadcast on 94.3 FM owned by St. Jude Thaddeus Institute of Technology.
