= DXXX =

DXXX is the roman numeral of 530. It may also refer to:

== Aviation ==
- Lomé–Tokoin International Airport (ICAO code)

== Media ==
- DXXX-AM, an AM radio station broadcasting in Zamboanga City, branded as Radyo Ronda
- DXXX-FM, an FM radio station broadcasting in Butuan City, branded as iFM
- DXXX-TV, a TV station broadcasting in Zamboanga City, branded as RPTV
