= DX10 (disambiguation) =

DX10 is an operating system for the Texas Instruments TI-990 CPU.

DX10 or DX-10 may refer to:

- DirectX 10
  - Direct3D 10, a part of Microsoft's DirectX application programming interface
- Fujifilm DX-10, an early digital camera made by Fujifilm

== See also ==
- DX9
- DX11
