= Damdaming Bayan =

Philippine weekday public affairs show

- Genre: News, Commentary, Public service
- Running time: 2 hours (including commercials)
- Country of origin: Philippines
- Home station: DZRH (1991–present)
- Starring: Deo Macalma; Elaine Apit (See list)
- Created by: MBC Media Group
- Narrated by: Nick de Guzman
- Original release: 1991 – present
- No. of episodes: n/a (airs daily)

Damdaming Bayan is a socio-commentary public service program of AM station DZRH in the Philippines, aired every weekdays at 8:00–10:00 am. The program is also simulcast over DZRH News Television nationwide.

== History ==
The format of the program has been the tackling of latest issues. In the early years, the program, while interviewing government officials in the station, allowed listeners to join the discussion through a phone call. At present, the opinions or reactions from the listeners and viewers are shared.

Since 2011, Damdaming Bayan added a new commentary segment called "Punto Bonito" with Nino Padilla as segment host.

In 2012, Karen Golfo was replaced by the station's Malacañang-assigned reporter Milky Rigonan. The same year changed its schedule to weekdays.

In October 2017, following the death of Taruc, the show was anchored by Angelo Palmones. It was until January 8, 2018, when former Department of Transportation Undersecretary for Railways Dr. Cesar Chavez became the anchor of the show until June 28, 2019.

In July 2019, Deo Macalma replaced Dr. Cesar Chavez and became the new permanent anchor of the show. He was joined a year after by Elaine Apit, also known as 'Sister L.'

== Hosts ==
Current hosts

- Deo Macalma (c. 1996, 2019–present)
- Robin Sienna (also with Love Radio Manila) (2023–present; fill-in anchor)
- DJ Nick (also with 96.3 Easy Rock) (2020–present; fill-in anchor)
- Cheska San Diego-Bobadilla (also with Radyo Natin Nationwide) (2023–present; fill-in anchor)
- Elaine Apit (2020–present)
- Lyka Barista (also with 101.1 Yes The Best) (2022–present; fill-in anchor)
- Rey Sibayan (2016–present; fill-in anchor every Friday)

Former hosts

- Joe Taruc (1991–2017)
- Lulu Pascual (1991–1993)
- Angelique Lazo (1993–1996)
- Nick de Guzman (c. 1996)
- Ali Sotto (c. 1996–1998)
- Jay Sonza (2000–2004)
- Milky Rigonan (2016–2018)
- Angelo Palmones (2017–2018)
- Cesar Chavez (2018–2019)
- Regi Espiritu (2014–2023; fill-in anchor every Friday)
- Dennis Antenor, Jr. (1998–2022; fill-in anchor every Friday) (now with ALIW Channel 23 and Aliw Broadcasting Corporation)
- Nino Padilla (2011–2016)
- Karen Golfo (2012–2016)

== Awards ==
- Best Public Affairs Program (16th KBP Golden Dove Awards, 2007)
- Best Public Affairs Program (28th KBP Golden Dove Awards, 2025)

== See also ==
- DZRH
