= DXFL =

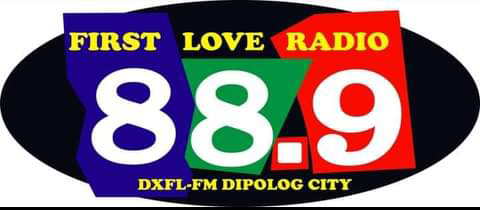
- Dipolog; Philippines
- Broadcast area: Eastern Zamboanga del Norte and surrounding areas
- Frequency: 88.9 MHz
- Branding: DXFL 88.9

Programming
- Languages: Cebuano, Filipino, English
- Format: Contemporary MOR, News, Talk

Ownership
- Owner: First Love Broadcasting Network

History
- First air date: June 24, 1993
- Call sign meaning: Franklin Lim (station owner)

Technical information
- Licensing authority: NTC
- Power: 5,000 watts
- ERP: 16,000 watts

DXFL (88.9 FM) First Love Radio is a radio station owned and operated by First Love Broadcasting Network. The station's studio is located along Jose P. Rizal Ave. cor. Arellano St., Dipolog, while its transmitter is located at Brgy. Gulayon, Dipolog.

== Incidents and controversies ==
- On the early morning of May 31, 2013, gunshots were fired piercing the announcer's booth of the station. No one was hurt or killed at that time.
- Nick Carbonel, a well-known radio personality in DXFL, was sued by Congressman Rosendo Labadlabad for libel in 2017. Claims on misinformation alleging the representative at the time were unclear.
