= DXCM-FM =

Radio station in Zamboanga City, Philippines

Love Radio Zamboanga (DXCM)
- Zamboanga City; Philippines
- Broadcast area: Zamboanga City, Basilan and surrounding areas
- Frequency: 97.9 MHz
- Branding: 97.9 Love Radio

Programming
- Languages: Chavacano, Filipino
- Format: Contemporary MOR, OPM
- Network: Love Radio

Ownership
- Owner: MBC Media Group
- Sister stations: DZRH Zamboanga, 102.7 Yes FM

History
- First air date: October 12, 1990
- Former names: Easy Rock (July 8, 2009-February 25, 2014)
- Call sign meaning: Inverted as Manila Broadcasting Company

Technical information
- Licensing authority: NTC
- Power: 10,000 watts
- ERP: 25,000 watts

Links
- Webcast: Listen Live
- Website: Love Radio Zamboanga

DXCM (97.9 FM), broadcasting as 97.9 Love Radio, is a radio station owned and operated by MBC Media Group. The station's studio and transmitter are located at the 4th Floor, Jose Go Huilo Bldg., Tomas Claudio St., Zamboanga City.

== History ==
DXCM was inaugurated on October 12, 1990, as Love Radio, carrying an easy listening format. In the early years, DXCM carried live news broadcast from DZRH and plays classic, OPM and pop music. It also aired "Love Radio Top 30 Countdown" and the "Afternoon Radio Show" in the mid-1990s. In 2000, it switched to a mass-based format.

In late 2008, lack of resources and financial challenges led to Love Radio's closure of air-time operations. On July 8, 2009, DXCM returned on air, this time as Easy Rock. Shai Tisai, who is currently part of Easy Rock Manila, started her career in the station as Bea.

On February 26, 2014, the station was rebranded back to Love Radio, coinciding with the rebranding of its sister station as Yes FM.
