= Mindanao Examiner =

- Format: Journal
- Publisher: Maritess Fernandez
- Editor-in-chief: Al Jacinto
- Founded: 2006
- Language: English, Tagalog
- Headquarters: Zamboanga City
- Circulation: Zamboanga City, Zamboanga Peninsula, ARMM, Davao City, Cebu, Manila
- Price: P 10.00
- Website: www.mindanaoexaminer.com

The Mindanao Examiner is an independent regional newspaper published and edited every week with general circulation in Mindanao, Philippines.

It is located at the Unit 15, 3F Fairland Bldg., Mayor Vitaliano Agan Avenue, Zamboanga City. It offers video productions and has a cable channel in Pagadian City in Zamboanga del Sur province (KISMET Cable TV).
