= DXWO =

Radyo Sincero Pagadian (DXWO)
- Pagadian; Philippines
- Broadcast area: Zamboanga del Sur
- Frequency: 99.9 MHz
- Branding: 99.9 Radyo Sincero

Programming
- Languages: Filipino, Cebuano
- Format: Contemporary MOR, News, Talk
- Network: Radyo Sincero

Ownership
- Owner: Times Broadcasting Network Corporation
- Operator: ABJ Broadcasting Services

History
- First air date: 1992
- Former names: Power 99 (1992-2016); Radyo BisDak (2016-2026)

Technical information
- Licensing authority: NTC
- Power: 5,000 watts

DXWO (99.9 FM), broadcasting as 99.9 Radyo Sincero, is a radio station owned by Times Broadcasting Network Corporation and operated by ABJ Broadcasting Services. The station's studio is located at the 2nd Floor., Bajamunde Bldg, Warlito Palmones St, Barangay. Santiago, Pagadian.

Radyo Sincero used to broadcast on 95.5 FM from its inception in February 2025 to May 10, 2026. It transferred to its current frequency the following day.

== Incidents ==
On September 13, 2000, at around 7:00 p.m., an explosion, apparently caused by an improvised bomb, occurred near the door of the station, which was then located on the fourth floor of the Aderico Optical Building.
