= DXJP-TV =

DXJP-DTV (Solar Flix TV-27 Zamboanga)
- Sagot ka namin!

Zamboanga City; Philippines
- Channels: Digital: 27 (UHF) (ISDB-Tb) (test broadcast); Virtual: 27.02
- Branding: Solar Flix TV-27 Zamboanga

Programming
- Subchannels: See list
- Affiliations: 27.2: SolarFlix; 27.3: Shop TV

Ownership
- Owner: Southern Broadcasting Network (a subsidiary of Solar Entertainment Corporation)

History
- Founded: 2008
- Former call signs: DXJP-TV (2008-2019)
- Former channel numbers: Analog: 27 (UHF) (2008-2019)

Technical information
- ERP: 1 kilowatts

DXJP-DTV, known as Solar Flix TV-27 Zamboanga, is an affiliate/relay television station of SolarFlix. The studios & transmitter located at Zamboanga City.

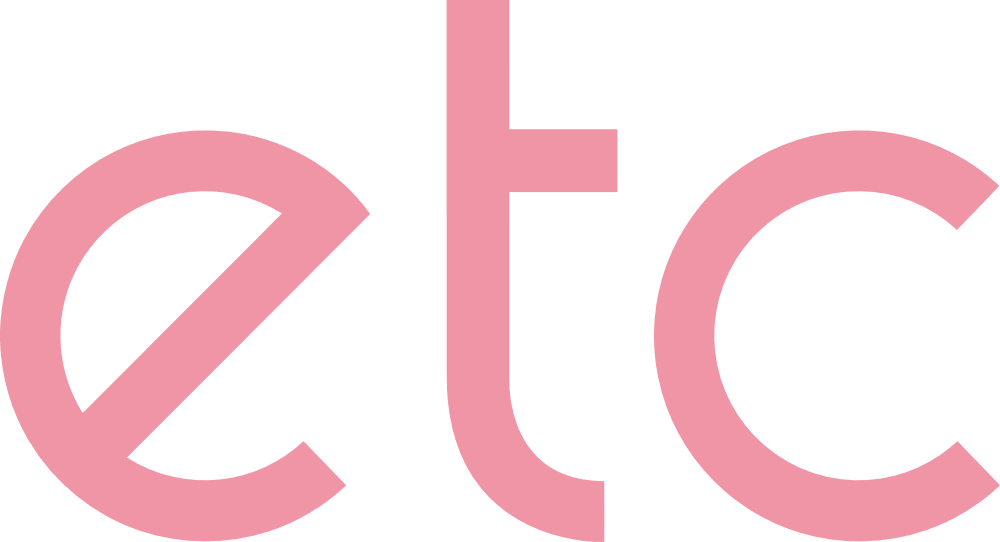
ETC Zamboanga (2019–2022)

== Areas of coverage ==
=== Primary areas ===
- Zamboanga Peninsula
- Zamboanga del Norte
- Zamboanga del Sur
- Zamboanga Sibugay

=== Secondary areas ===
- Portion of Bukidnon
- Portion of Lanao del Norte
- Portion of Lanao del Sur
- Portion of Misamis Occidental
- Portion of Misamis Oriental

== Digital television ==
=== Subchannels ===
DXJP-TV operates on UHF Channel 27 (551.143 MHz), and is multiplexed into the following subchannels:

Channel	Video	Aspect	Short name	Programming	Note
27.02	480i	16:9	SolarFlix	SolarFlix	Test Broadcast
27.03	480i	16:9	Shop TV	Shop TV	Test Broadcast
27.04	480i	16:9	DepEd ALS	Solar Learning (DepEd TV ALS)	Test Broadcast
27.05	480i	16:9	Reserved Channel	Reserved	Test Broadcast
27.06	480i	16:9	Reserved Channel	Reserved	Test Broadcast

== See also ==
- DWCP-DTV
- Southern Broadcasting Network
