= DXSY-FM =

Radio station in Misamis Occidental, Philippines

Radyo Sincero Ozamiz (DXSY)
- Ozamiz; Philippines
- Broadcast area: Misamis Occidental
- Frequency: 96.1 MHz
- Branding: 96.1 Radyo Sincero

Programming
- Languages: Filipino, Cebuano
- Format: Contemporary MOR, News, Talk
- Network: Radyo Sincero

Ownership
- Owner: Times Broadcasting Network Corporation
- Operator: ABJ Broadcasting Services
- Sister stations: DXSY 1242

History
- Former names: Y96 (1990-2016); Radyo BisDak (2016-2026)
- Call sign meaning: Alex Velayo Sy (former owner)

Technical information
- Licensing authority: NTC
- Class: CDE
- Power: 5,000 watts

DXSY (96.1 FM), broadcasting as 96.1 Radyo Sincero, is a radio station owned by Times Broadcasting Network Corporation and operated by ABJ Broadcasting Services. The station's studio is located at 2/F Paguito Yu Bldg., Mabini Extension, Brgy. Carmen Annex, Ozamiz.
