= Malanday =

Barangay in Valenzuela City, Metro Manila, Philippines

- Barangay
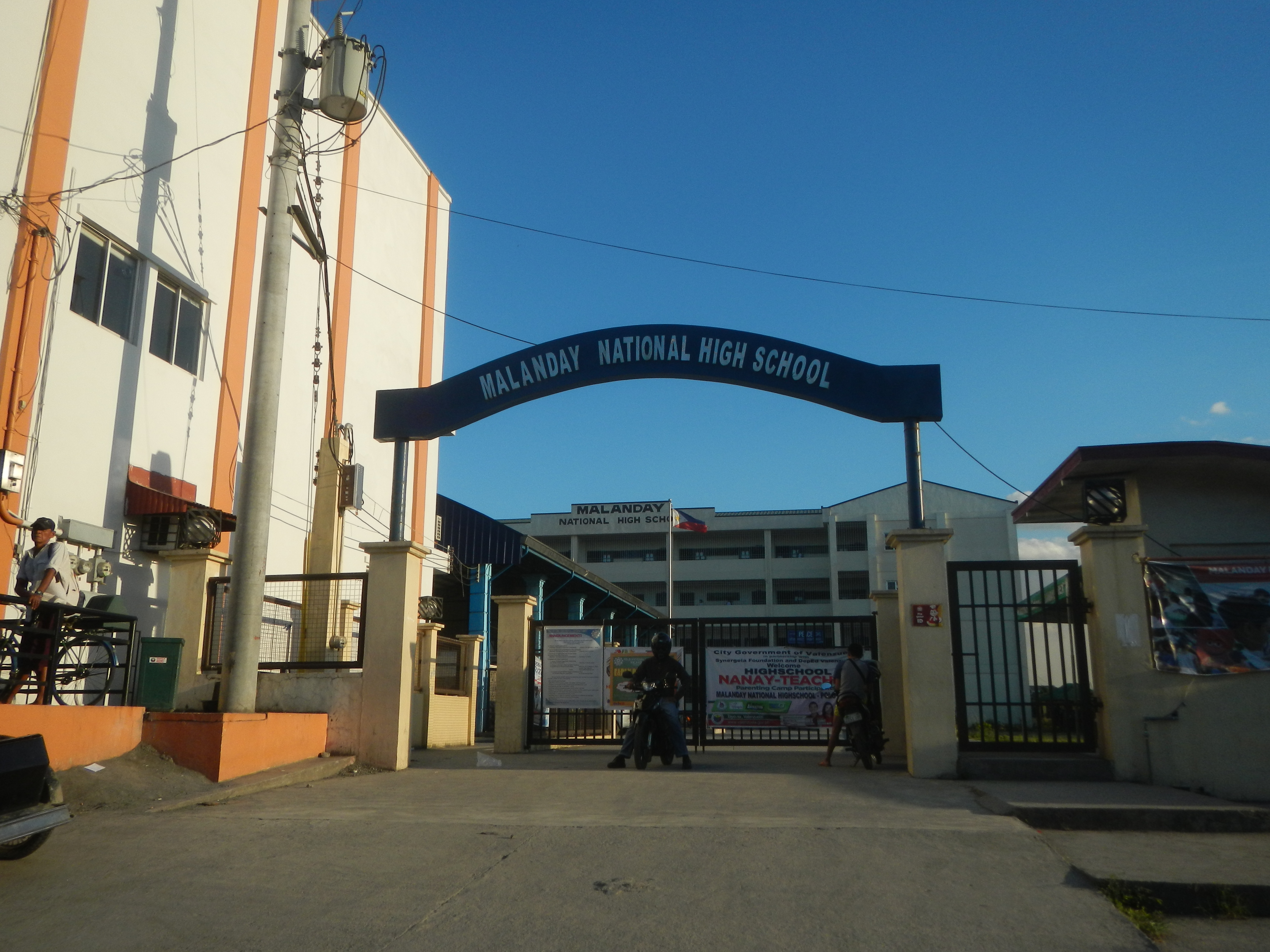
- Malanday National High School

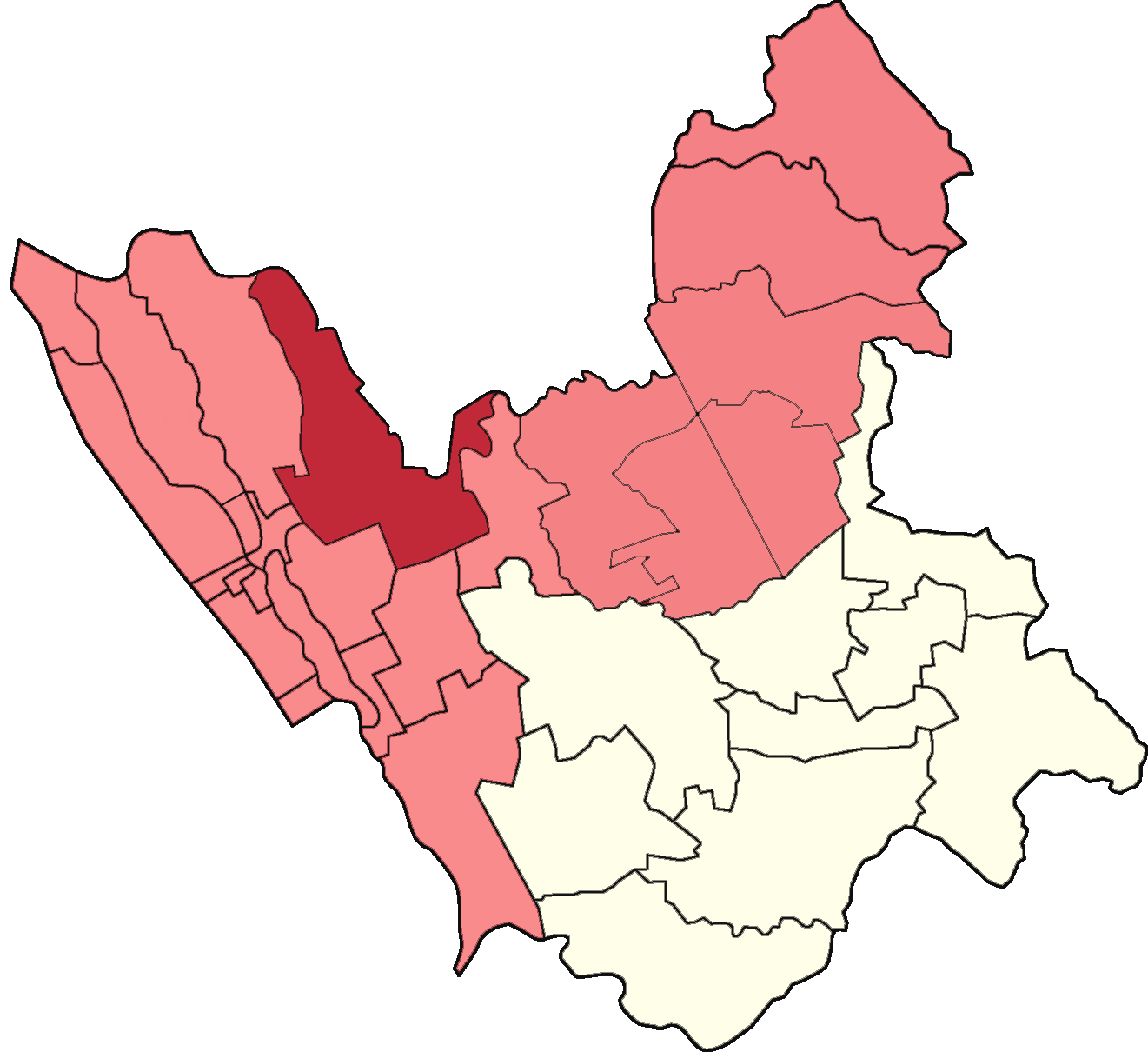
- Location of Malanday in the 1st legislative district of Valenzuela
- Interactive map of Malanday
- Coordinates: 14°43′10″N 120°57′17″E
- Country: Philippines
- Region: National Capital Region
- City: Valenzuela
- Congressional districts: Part of the 1st district of Valenzuela

Government
  - Type: Barangay
  - Barangay Chairman: Efren Santiago
  - SK Chairwoman: Kristine Gaile T. Gregorio

Area
  - Total: 295.60 km^{2} (114.13 sq mi)

Population (2020 Census)
  - Total: 19,060
  - Density: 64.48/km^{2} (167.0/sq mi)
- Time zone: UTC+8 (PST)
- ZIP code: 1444
- Area code: 2

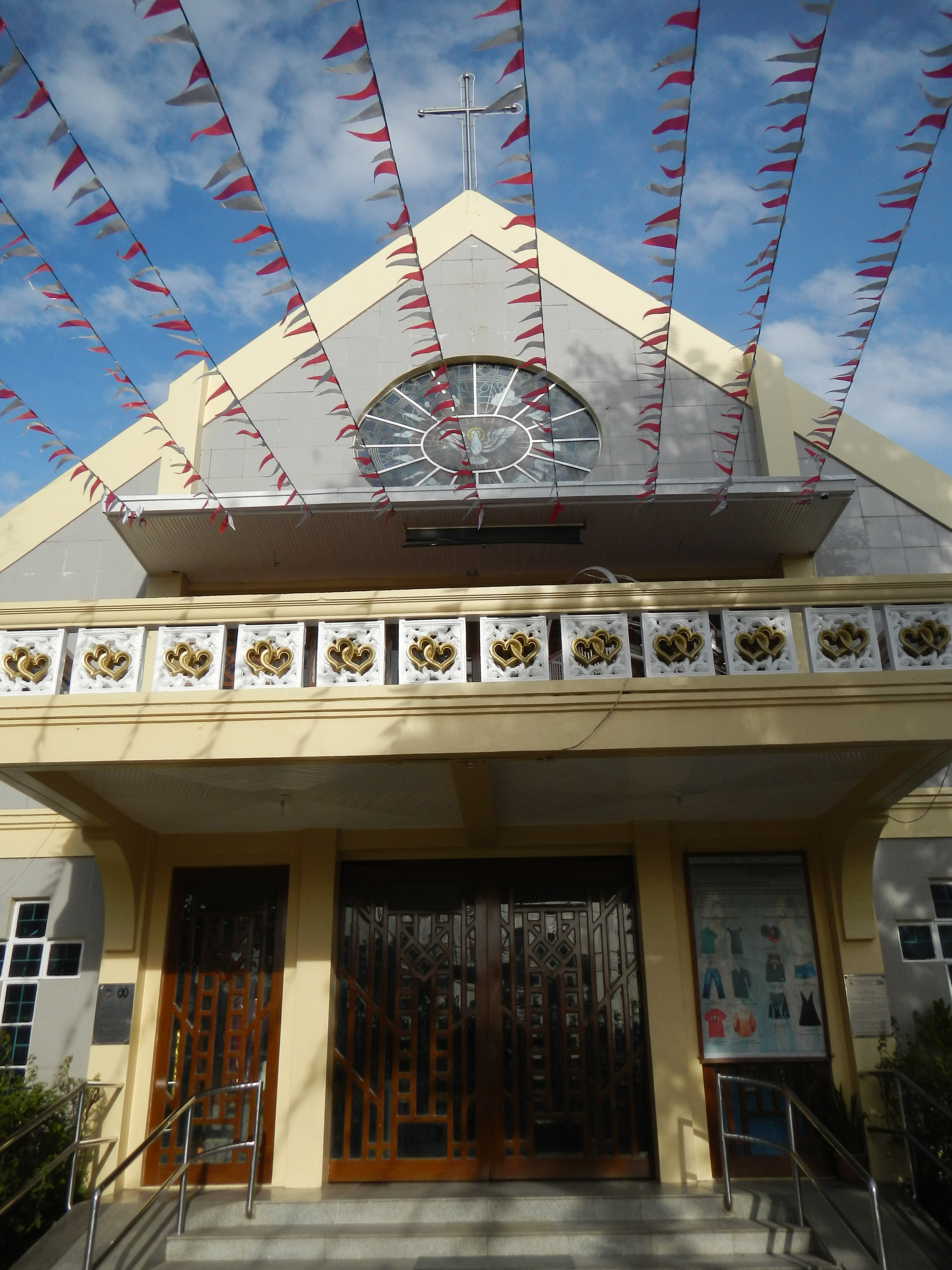
Hearts of Jesus and Mary Parish Church of Malanday.

Malanday (Tagalog pronunciation: [mɐlɐnˈdaj]) is a settlement and one of the constituent barangays in the city of Valenzuela, Metro Manila, Philippines. It is located in the northern section of the city bordering Meycauayan in the province of Bulacan.

== Etymology ==
The name Malanday is said to derive from a Filipino phrase meaning "a bowl plate", a reference to the area's terrain.

== Demographics ==
The area is 295.60 square kilometers (114.13 sq mi) with a population of 19,060 and density of 61 inhabitants per square kilometer (160/sq mi) as of 2020.

=== Sitio(s) ===
There are a total of five Sitios in the Barangay of Malanday

- Sitio Hulo
- Sitio Libo (divided into two: Libo I and Libo II)
- Sitio Lingahan
- Sitio Umboy

== Education ==
There are a total of four schools located in Barangay Malanday.

=== Public schools ===
These are the schools operated by the Government of Valenzuela:

- Andres Fernando Elementary School
- Malanday National Highschool

=== Private schools ===
These are the schools which is not operated by the Government of Valenzuela:

- Emmaus Christian School
- High Horizons Learning Center

Some residential parts of the barangay have Tutorial Centers or offers Tutor to the students.

== Festivals ==
Residents celebrate the annual fiesta of Santo Kristo on the last Sunday of April.

Major events in the fiesta is managed and organized by Hearts of Jesus and Mary Parish with the cooperation of the Church members in every Sitio. Events includes Contest like Best Arch Design and Streetdance Competition. The Church also organizes the Morning Procession and Evening Procession or the Sagala offered to Señor Santo Kristo and the Pontifical High Mass every morning and evening.

Meanwhile, other events like games and parties in some Sitio are voluntarily organized by the residents of every Sitio or specific compounds.

== Landmarks ==
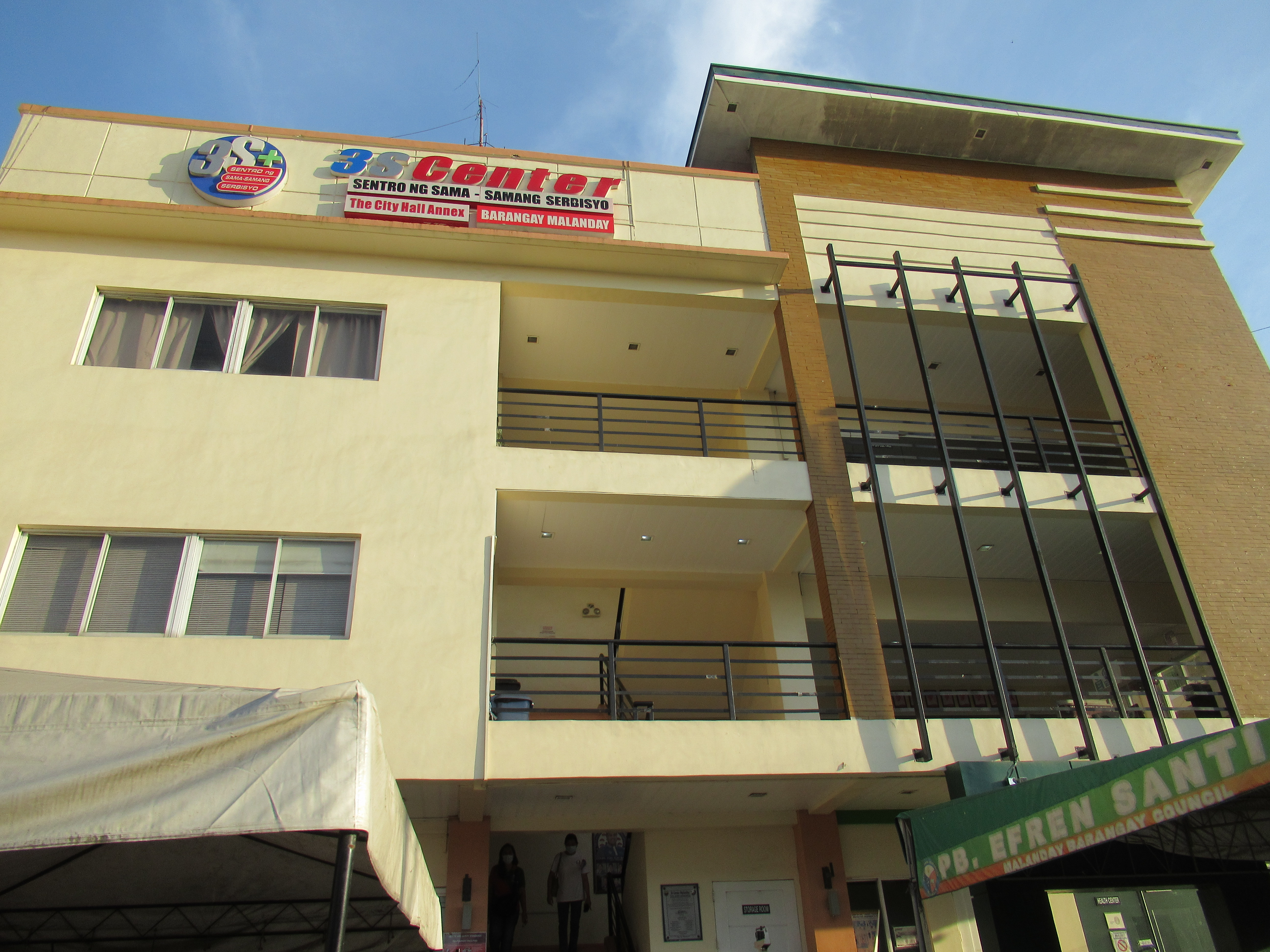
3S Center Malanday

Andres Fernando Elementary School (AFES) Malanday National High School and a 3S Center are located on M.H. Del Pilar Street. Other known landmarks in Malanday include the Andres Fernando Elementary School, Malanday Market, the Malanday Bus Terminal, the VSCA Cock Fighting Arena and the Hearts of Jesus and Mary Parish. The transmitter facility of radio station DZRH (one of the Philippines' oldest radio stations owned by MBC Media Group) is also located in Malanday.

=== Notable events ===
==== 2012 floodings ====
In 2012, Malanday experienced intense flooding brought by heavy rains. Malanday is one of the 20 barangays under state of calamity declared by the Local Government. As of August 5, 2012, about 200 families were residing in city evacuation centers.

==== Lingahan fire ====
On December 11, 2015, at 11 pm PHT (UTC+8), a fire occurred on the roads of Sitio Lingahan, Malanday. The fire blazed through more than 200 houses. One man was found dead in a nearby pond after the fire. The families first evacuated to the Hearts of Jesus and Mary Parish, but they moved to Malanday National High School after finding relief there.
