= Fujifilm DX-10 =

Overview
- Type: Digital Point-and-shoot

Lens
- Lens: Fixed focus Fujinon lens

Sensor/medium
- Maximum resolution: 0.80 megapixels
- Film speed: ISO 150
- Storage media: SmartMedia cards

Focusing
- Focus areas: 0.7 m (28") to ∞ (Normal); 10 cm (3.9") (Macro)

Exposure/metering
- Exposure modes: "Synchro" Mode; Continuous Shot Mode; Manual Mode; Automatic Mode
- Exposure metering: 64 zone TTL (through-the-lens) exposure metering

Flash
- Flash: 0.7 to 3.0 m (2.3 to 9.8 ft); On, Off, Auto, Auto Red Eye Reduce

Shutter
- Shutter speed range: 1/4 to 1/1000 of a second
- Continuous shooting: Yes, 9 shots in 2 seconds

Viewfinder
- Viewfinder: Yes

General
- LCD screen: 1.8", 70K Pixel
- Battery: Alkaline, Lithium, NiMH (Recommended, NiCd
- Dimensions: 110 x 77 x 33 mm (4.3 x 3.0 x 1.3 in)
- Weight: 200 g (7 oz., without batteries)

The DX-10 was an entry-level Fujifilm digital camera featuring an 810,000 pixel sensor (1024x768 or 640x480 image size) and a fixed-focus lens. It was introduced in 1999.
