= DXGP =

Agusan Radio (DXGP)
- Prosperidad; Philippines
- Broadcast area: Agusan del Sur, Agusan del Norte and Surigao del Sur
- Frequency: 89.7 MHz
- Branding: DXGP Agusan Radio

Programming
- Languages: Cebuano, Filipino
- Format: News, Public Affairs, Talk, Government Radio

Ownership
- Owner: Agusan Del Sur Broadcasting Service

History
- First air date: 1996
- Former call signs: DXDA
- Former frequencies: 927 kHz

Technical information
- Licensing authority: NTC
- Power: 10,000 watts

DXGP (89.7 FM) Agusan Radio is a radio station owned and operated by Agusan Del Sur Broadcasting Service, the media arm of the Government of Agusan del Sur. Its studio is located in DOP Government Center, Brgy. Patin-ay, Prosperidad.
