= Joe Taruc =

Filipino radio broadcaster (1947-2017)

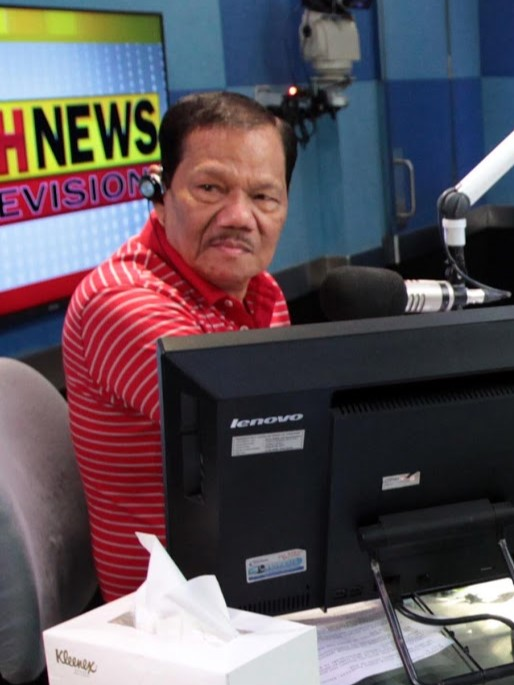
- Taruc in 2016
- Born: Jose Malgapo Taruc Jr. September 18, 1947; Gapan, Nueva Ecija, Philippines
- Died: September 30, 2017 (aged 70); Quezon City, Philippines
- Children: 4, including Jay Taruc
- Presenting career
- Show: DZRH Pangunahing Balita, Damdaming Bayan
- Station: DZRH
- Network: Manila Broadcasting Company

Jose Malgapo Taruc Jr. (Tagalog pronunciation: [tɐˈɾuk]; September 18, 1947 – September 30, 2017), also known as Joe Taruc, was a Filipino news anchor who worked at DZRH in the Philippines. He was one of the top-rating news anchors on radio. Aside from being a news anchor, Taruc was also the Senior-Vice President of the station.

== Career ==
He was the news anchor of the 7:00 am newscast DZRH Pangunahing Balita as well as Damdaming Bayan, one of the longest-running public affairs programs on the station. Taruc interviewed people about politics, mostly the president. He was also the pioneer of ABS-CBN DZAQ Radyo Patrol (predecessor of DZMM) before the Martial Law regime. Then in the 1980s, Taruc transferred to DWWW 630 of the Kanlaon Broadcasting System (now DZMM) where he teamed up with Tiya Dely Magpayo and Noli de Castro in a morning program. He also worked on DZBB Bisig Bayan 594 (later rebranded as Super Radyo) before his transfer to DZRH in 1991, which he became the station manager and newscaster.

Aside from radio, Taruc also worked in films with Phillip Salvador during the 1980s.

== Personal life ==
Taruc had 3 sons and a daughter, including former i-Witness host and documentarian, One Balita Pilipinas news anchor, and Ride Radio TV and radio show host Jay Taruc.

== Death ==
He died on September 30, 2017, 12 days after his 70th birthday on September 18, 2017.

== Filmography ==
=== Film ===
- Bayan Ko: Kapit sa Patalim (1985)
- Orapronobis (1989)
- Alab ng Lahi (2003)

=== TV/Radio ===
- Liberty Live with Joe Taruc (GMA) (1994-1996)
- Balitang Bayan Numero Uno (1987-2011)
- Todo Balita (1992-2008)
- Unilab Newscast
- Pangunahing Balita (2008-2017)
- Damdaming Bayan (1991-2017)

== Awards ==
- Broadcast Journalist of the Year for Radio—Hall of Fame Awardee (Rotary Club of Manila Journalism Awards for 2005)
- Ka Doroy Valencia Broadcaster of the Year (16th KBP Golden Dove Awards, 2007)

== See also ==
- DZRH
- Manila Broadcasting Company
