= Don Anselmo Bernad Avenue =

Road in the Ozamiz, Philippines

Don Anselmo Bernad Avenue
- DABA
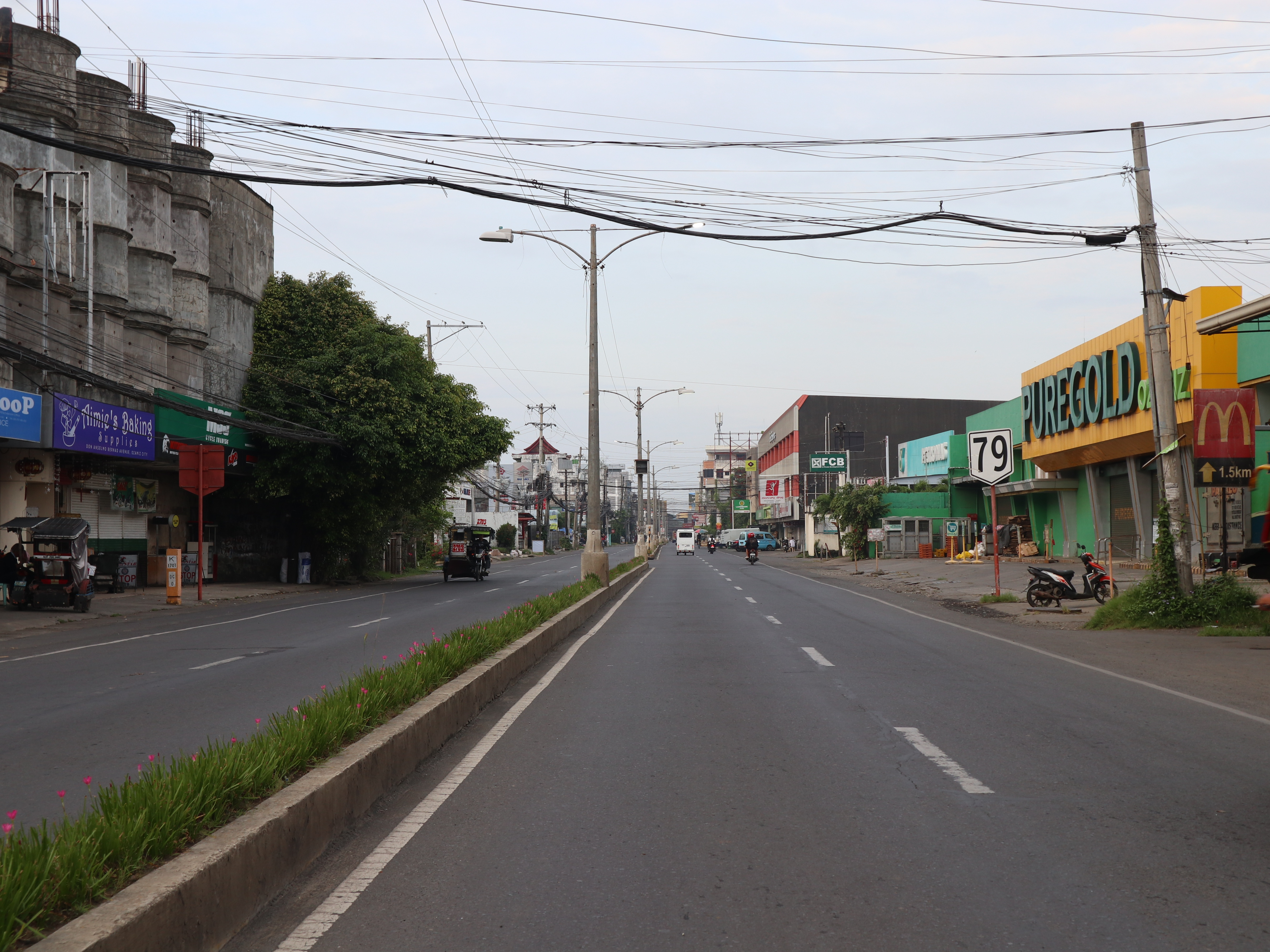
- Ozamiz City Proper

Location
- Country: Philippines
- Provinces: Misamis Occidental
- Major cities: Ozamiz

Highway system
- Roads in the Philippines; Highways; Expressways; List

Don Anselmo Bernad Avenue (Cebuano: Dalan Don Anselmo Bernad, Tagalog: Abenida Don Anselmo Bernad), commonly referred to by its acronym DABA, is a major road in Ozamiz City, Misamis Occidental. Several banks and commercial establishments are located along this avenue, making this road one of the busiest in Ozamiz. It is part of the Ozamiz–Oroquieta Road, which intersects with Ozamiz–Pagadian Road.

It is named after Don Anselmo Bernad, former mayor of Misamis town and former governor of Misamis Occidental. It was also formerly known as the Don Mariano Marcos Avenue.

== Landmarks ==
=== Banks ===
- 1st Valley Bank Ozamiz-Bernad
- Banco Dipolog Ozamiz
- Eastwest Bank Ozamiz
- First Consolidated Bank Ozamiz
- Land Bank of the Philippines Ozamiz
- Panguil Bay Rural Bank of Ozamiz
- PenBank Ozamiz
- Philippine Business Bank Ozamiz
- Rizal Commercial Banking Corporation Ozamiz
- Robinson's Bank Ozamiz
- Rural Bank of Rizal Ozamiz

=== Government centers ===
- Ozamiz City Hall / Mayor Fernando T. Bernad Memorial Hall
- Social Security System Ozamiz

=== Parks ===
- Prospera Park

=== Restaurants/fast food and hotels ===
- Chowking Drive-Thru Ozamiz Bernad
- Greenwich Ozamiz
- Jollibee Drive-Thru Ozamiz Bernad
- New Central Restaurant
- McDonald's Drive-Thru Ozamiz Bernad
- Gat's Bar and Restaurant
- KFC Ozamiz
- Shakey's Ozamiz

=== Other notable buildings ===
- PLDT Ozamiz
- Insular Building
- Gloria Bazaar
- St. Peter's Chapel
- Gov. Angel N. Medina, Sr. Gymnatorium
- TE Petron Service Center
- Suzuki Auto Ozamiz
- Toyota Ozamiz Satellite Office
- Kia Motors Ozamiz
- Sony Service Center Office Ozamiz
- Goldsquare Ozamiz
- PUREGOLD Ozamiz
