= D20 =

D20, D-20 or d20 may refer to:

== Arts, entertainment, and media ==
- d20, a 20-sided die commonly used in role-playing games
- d20 System, a role-playing game system published by Wizards of the Coast
- Arriflex D-20, a film-style digital high definition movie camera
- D-20, a version of the Roland D-50 synthesizer
- Dimension 20, a tabletop role-playing game show made by CollegeHumor/Dropout
- Queen's Gambit Accepted, Encyclopaedia of Chess Openings code

== Military ==
- 152 mm gun-howitzer D-20, a Soviet artillery piece
- ARA Almirante Brown (D-20), a destroyer that served with the Argentine Navy between 1961 and 1982
- Brazilian destroyer escort Baependi (D20), a destroyer escort that served with the Brazilian Navy between 1944 and 1975
- Greek destroyer Doxa (D20), a destroyer that served with the Royal Hellenic Navy between 1951 and 1972
- HMS Fife (D20), a Royal Navy guided missile destroyer launched in 1964 and decommissioned in 1987

== Science ==
- D20, a diffractometer located at Institut Laue–Langevin used in neutron research
- Heavy water, or deuterium oxide (D_{2}O or ^{2}H_{2}O)

== Vehicles and transport ==
- D20 road (Croatia), a state road
- Aero Synergie Jodel D20, a French ultralight
- Chevrolet D-20, a pick-up truck made in Brazil and Argentina
- H Street Line, a Washington DC Metrobus route, designated D20
- LNER D20, a class of British steam locomotives
- Senova D20, a subcompact car made by SAIC in China
- Soloviev D-20, a Soviet turbofan engine

== Other ==
- Dublin 20, a Dublin, Ireland postal district
- 2020 Democratic National Convention, American political convention, branded as "D20"
