= DXAQ-FM =

Radyo Sincero Dipolog (DXAQ)
- Dipolog; Philippines
- Broadcast area: Eastern Zamboanga del Norte and surrounding areas
- Frequency: 95.9 MHz
- Branding: 95.9 Radyo Sincero

Programming
- Languages: Cebuano, Filipino
- Format: Contemporary MOR, News, Talk
- Network: Radyo Sincero

Ownership
- Owner: Times Broadcasting Network Corporation
- Operator: ABJ Broadcasting Services

History
- First air date: 1990s
- Former names: Q95 (1990s-2016); Radyo BisDak (2016-2026)

Technical information
- Licensing authority: NTC
- Power: 5 kW

Radyo Bisdak logo.

95.9 Radyo Sincero (DXAQ 95.9 MHz) is an FM station owned and operated by Times Broadcasting Network Corporation. Its studios and transmitter are located at the 2nd Floor, JM Building, Bonifacio St., Brgy. Central, Dipolog.
