= DXHT =

Radio station in Zamboanga City, Philippines

Yes FM Zamboanga (DXHT)
- Zamboanga City; Philippines
- Broadcast area: Zamboanga City, Basilan and surrounding areas
- Frequency: 102.7 MHz
- Branding: 102.7 Yes FM

Programming
- Languages: Chavacano, Filipino
- Format: Contemporary MOR, OPM
- Network: Yes FM

Ownership
- Owner: MBC Media Group; (Cebu Broadcasting Company)
- Sister stations: DZRH Zamboanga, 97.9 Love Radio

History
- First air date: 1998
- Former call signs: DXRM (1998–2005)
- Former names: Magic 102.7 (1998); Hot FM (January 1, 1999-February 23, 2014)
- Call sign meaning: Hot FM (former branding)

Technical information
- Licensing authority: NTC
- Power: 10,000 watts
- ERP: 20,000 watts
- Transmitter coordinates: 6°54′28.91″N 122°4′46.44″E

Links
- Webcast: Listen Live
- Website: Yes FM Zamboanga

DXHT (102.7 FM), broadcasting as 102.7 Yes FM, is a radio station owned and operated by MBC Media Group through its licensee Cebu Broadcasting Company. The station's studio and transmitter are located at the 4th Floor, Jose Go Huilo Bldg., Tomas Claudio St., Zamboanga City.

== History ==
- In 1998, the station was launched as Magic 102.7 under the call letters DXRM with a Top 40 format. This is the only time Quest Broadcasting made its provincial Magic stations as other stations carried the Killerbee name.
- On January 1, 1999, Manila Broadcasting Company acquired the station while the next year the frequency moved to 95.5 MHz. As a result, it was rebranded as 102.7 Hot FM and switched to a mass-based format.
- In 2005, the station changed its call letters to DXHT.
- In 2011, it was ranked #1 in the city, based on the Nielsen Media Research Survey held in that year.
- On February 24, 2014, the station, along with the O&O Hot FM stations was rebranded as Yes FM.
- On May 1, 2017, the station started carrying the Yes The Best branding.
- On February 5, 2024, it reverted back as Yes FM.
