= DXZB-TV =

Defunct television station in Zamboanga City

- Zamboanga; Philippines
- Channels: Analog: 13 (VHF); Digital: TBA (UHF)
- Branding: TV13 Zamboanga

Programming
- Affiliations: independent

Ownership
- Owner: TV13 Cooperative for Service of Zamboanga

History
- Founded: 1986
- Former affiliations: CBN/ABS-CBN (1962-1972); Intercontinental Broadcasting Corporation (1986-1991, 1996-1998, & 2005-2014)
- Call sign meaning: DX; ZamBoanga

Technical information
- Licensing authority: NTC
- Power: 100 watts

DXZB-TV, channel 13, is a low powered Television station owned and managed by TV-13 Cooperative for Service of Zamboanga under Atty. Gerasimo Acuña and Atty. Susan de los Reyes. Its studios and transmitter are located at JV Bldg., San Jose Panigayan St., Zamboanga City. It was a former affiliated station of Philippine television network Intercontinental Broadcasting Corporation from 1986 to 1991, 1996 to 1998, and 2005 to 2014. Today, the station airs movies and local programs such as news program Accion na Trese and Visia Zamboanga.

== Notable former personalities (as IBC Zamboanga) ==
- Julie Alipala-Inot

== See also ==
- Intercontinental Broadcasting Corporation
