= DXCB =

Radio station in Zamboanga City, Philippines

Star FM Zamboanga (DXCB)
- Zamboanga City; Philippines
- Broadcast area: Zamboanga City, Basilan and surrounding areas
- Frequency: 93.9 MHz
- Branding: 93.9 Star FM

Programming
- Languages: English, Chavacano, Filipino
- Format: Contemporary MOR, OPM, News
- Network: Star FM

Ownership
- Owner: Bombo Radyo Philippines; (People's Broadcasting Service, Inc.)

History
- First air date: May 17, 1995
- Call sign meaning: Consolidated Broadcasting (former licensee)

Technical information
- Licensing authority: NTC
- Power: 10,000 watts
- ERP: 20,000 watts
- Transmitter coordinates: 06°54′13″N 122°04′39″E

Links
- Webcast: Listen Live
- Website: Star FM Zamboanga

DXCB (93.9 FM), broadcasting as 93.9 Star FM, is a radio station owned and operated by Bombo Radyo Philippines through its licensee People's Broadcasting Service, Inc. Its studio, offices and transmitter are located at the 4th floor AJS Bldg., Concuera cor. Valderosa St., Zamboanga City.

It is one of the Star FM stations formerly licensed to Consolidated Broadcasting System from its inception in 1995 to 2018, when their licensee was transferred to People's Broadcasting Service.
