= Tiya Dely =

Filipino broadcaster (1920–2008)

- Born: Fidela Magpayo; October 29, 1920; Malate, Manila, Insular Government of the Philippine Islands
- Died: September 1, 2008 (aged 87); Manila Doctors Hospital; Ermita, Manila, Philippines
- Other name: First Lady of Philippine Radio
- Occupation: Radio broadcaster
- Known for: Radio broadcasting

Fidela Magpayo Reyes (October 29, 1920 – September 1, 2008), commonly known as Tiya Dely ("Aunt Dely"), was a Filipino radio broadcaster known for her counseling programs. She debuted in the 1950s and was among the first wave of broadcasters who popularized Filipino music. In contrast, American music still dominated the Philippine airwaves following the country's liberation from the United States.

Magpayo was also a newscaster, commentator, radio dramatist, writer, and producer during her time. She came to be recognized as the "First Lady of Philippine Radio" due to her prominence in the broadcasting industry.

== Education ==
After World War II, Magpayo supported the presidential campaign of Manuel Roxas. When Roxas won the elections, he made her the confidential secretary to then-Vice President Elpidio Quirino. During his term as President after Roxas' death, Quirino encouraged Magpayo to study and get a college degree. She thus entered Far Eastern University and took up Foreign Service, but later shifted to another course. Magpayo graduated from FEU in 1950 with a degree in Political Science.

== Career ==
Magpayo worked in theater, radio, film, and television. Her career in broadcasting started when she was about 18 years old after she joined radio comedians Andoy Balunbalunan and Dely Atay-Atayan as a group singer. She got her first counseling program on the radio station DZRH on October 6, 1953. She eventually transferred to the López family-owned DZMM. Magpayo was the last radio presenter heard on-air before DZXL was shut down after the imposition of Martial Law in 1972, however, she soon after continued to host her program, but this time over RPN's DWWW 630 kHz (later known as DWPM and now reverted again into DZMM). During the Marcos Era, she also become one of the network's anchors.

After Martial Law, Magpayo became the first-ever anchor of the then-reopened DZMM 630, but after a few years, she transferred to DZRH. There, she continued radio shows until she had total airtime of nearly seven decades, earning the title "First Lady of Philippine Radio". Even as an octogenarian, she maintained a full work schedule at the station, hosting a nightly show Ang Inyong Tiya Dely ("Your Aunt Dely") apart from her usual weekend program.

=== Acting ===
Magpayo also acted professionally and was a leading lady to Ángel Esmeralda, Pugo and Togo in several shows at the Manila Grand Opera House. She also acted in movies, most of which were produced by Sampaguita Pictures, LVN Pictures and Larry Santiago Productions. Among the films she appeared in were Basahang Ginto ("Rag of Gold") and Hinihintay Kita ("I await you").

=== Singing ===
She was also a singer, having recorded songs for Villar Records such as Pamaypay ng Maynila ("Hand fan of Manila"), Sa ilalim ng Ilang-Ilang ("Beneath the Ylang-ylang"), Pandanggo ni Neneng ("Neneng's fandango"), "Paru-Parong Bukid" ("Butterfly from the Field") and Nabasag ang Banga ("The jar is broken").

=== Advocacy ===
Throughout her career, Magpayo pushed to educate people on usage of the Filipino language. She also worked for the preservation of traditional Filipino values of respect, honour, and love.

== Death ==
At the age of 87, Magpayo was still a regular anchor of the DZRH radio program Serenata Kolektibista (now Serenata Filipina), in a segment that featured her longtime passions: kundiman and rondalla music. While anchoring said radio show on the evening of August 30, 2008, she suffered a stroke and was rushed to the Manila Doctors' Hospital. She died two days later on September 1, 2008, two months short of her 88th birthday.

== Awards ==
The awards Magpayo received for her contributions to the Philippine broadcast industry include the Pama-As Gintong Bai award from the National Commission for Culture and the Arts, and a Lifetime Achievement Award from the Kapisanan ng mga Brodkaster ng Pilipinas (KBP). In 2006, Magpayo was presented with the Gawad Plaridel Award by the University of the Philippines for keeping her "dedication, integrity, and professionalism". She was supposed to receive the Gawad Saguisag Quezon award; instead, her relatives accepted the award in her place. The award acknowledges her 60+ years in Philippine broadcasting.

== Personal life ==
Magpayo was married to Colonel Leonor Reyes Sr., a veteran of the Battle of Bataan and the Korean War. They had two daughters, Violeta and Delia, and a son, Leonor Jr.

== Broadcasts ==
=== Radio ===
- Serenata Kolektibista
- Dear Tiya Dely
- Kasaysayan sa mga Liham kay Tiya Dely
