= Times Broadcasting Network Corporation =

Philippine radio network

- Type: Private
- Industry: Broadcast
- Founded: 1975
- Founder: Emilio Sy
- Headquarters: Ozamiz, Philippines
- Key people: Alex Velayo Sy
- Owner: Bisdak Media Group

Times Broadcasting Network Corporation is a Philippine radio network. Its main headquarters is on the 2nd Floor, Paguito Yu Bldg., Mabini Ext., Brgy. Carmen Annex, Ozamiz.

== Profile ==
Times Broadcasting Network Corporation was founded in the 1970s by Emilio Sy with DXSY. In 1990, it expanded into FM, with its stations in Ozamiz, Dipolog, and Pagadian carrying a Top 40 format with unique branding for each. In 2010, after the death of Alex Velayo Sy, its stations started losing steam. In 2016, Bisdak Media Group acquired the company and rebranded its stations as Radyo BisDak, which since carried a music and news format. It also opened a few more stations in Zamboanga and Central Visayas. By May 2026, most of its stations became part of the Radyo Sincero network.

== TBNC stations ==
=== AM stations ===
Branding	Callsign	Frequency	Location
Radyo Bantay	DXSY	1242 kHz	Ozamiz

=== FM stations ===
Branding	Callsign	Frequency	Location
Radyo Sincero Ozamiz	DXSY	96.1 MHz	Ozamiz
Radyo Sincero Pagadian	DXWO	99.9 MHz	Pagadian
Radyo Sincero Dipolog	DXAQ	95.9 MHz	Dipolog
K5 News FM Siquijor	—N/a	105.7 MHz	Siquijor
Radyo Sincero Canlaon	—N/a	106.1 MHz	Canlaon
Radyo BisDak Bogo	—N/a	97.3 MHz	Bogo
Radyo BisDak Balamban	—N/a	100.7 MHz	Balamban
