= DXXX-AM =

Radio station in Zamboanga City, Philippines

Radyo Ronda Zamboanga (DXXX)
- Zamboanga City; Philippines
- Broadcast area: Zamboanga City, Basilan and surrounding areas
- Frequency: 1008 kHz
- Branding: RPN DXXX Radyo Ronda

Programming
- Languages: Chavacano, Filipino
- Format: News, Public Affairs, Talk, Drama
- Network: Radyo Ronda

Ownership
- Owner: Radio Philippines Network

History
- First air date: 1959
- Former call signs: DXJW (1959–1972)
- Former frequencies: 1010 kHz (1959–1978)
- Call sign meaning: Roman numeral of 30

Technical information
- Licensing authority: NTC
- Power: 10,000 watts (5,000 watts operational)

Links
- Website: www.rpnradio.com/dxxx-zamboanga

DXXX (1008 AM) Radyo Ronda is a radio station owned and operated by the Radio Philippines Network. The station's studios are located at the 3rd floor, Fairland Property Bldg., Mayor Vitaliano Agan St. (Nuñez Ext.), Zamboanga City.

== History ==
The station was established in 1959 as DXJW under 1010 kHz. It was owned by Alto Broadcasting System of Antonio Quirino and James Lindenberg, which became ABS-CBN in 1967. On September 23, 1972, it was among the stations closed down by the government. The following year, it returned on air, this time under its current call letters and current ownership.
