= DZRH News Television =

Television news channel in the Philippines

DZRH TV
- Una Sa Pilipinas, Una Sa Pilipino!
- Country: Philippines
- Broadcast area: Nationwide, Worldwide
- Network: DZRH
- Headquarters: Pasay, Metro Manila, Philippines

Programming
- Picture format: 720p/1080i HDTV (downscaled to 16:9 480i for the SDTV feed); 4K UHDTV (source feed and livestream)

Ownership
- Owner: MBC Media Group

History
- Launched: October 1, 2007; 19 years ago
- Former names: TV Natin (2007–2008); RHTV (2008–2013)

Links
- Website: dzrh.com.ph

Availability

Terrestrial
- Digital terrestrial television: Channel 43.1 (Cebu); Channel 39.1 (Bacolod); Channel 43.1 (Iloilo); Channel 26.1 (Manila)
- SkyCable (Metro Manila): Channel 129
- Converge Vision / SkyTV (Metro Manila): Channel 26
- Sky Direct (Metro Manila): Channel 12
- Cablelink (Metro Manila): Channel 4
- Cignal TV (Nationwide): Channel 18
- G Sat (Nationwide): Channel 36
- SatLite (Nationwide): Channel 140

Streaming media
- DZRHNews.com.ph: Watch Live

DZRH News Television (stylized as DZRHTV or RHTV in capital letters) is a Philippine pay television news channel owned by MBC Media Group. Its programs are primarily from MBC Media Group's flagship radio station DZRH and station-produced programs, occupied by the timeslots of radio dramas.

DZRH News Television is the second free-to-air channel that re-broadcasts news from a radio station, after DZMM launched its own TV channel, while other stations in Metro Manila and other parts of the country soon followed. The channel is also livestreaming on YouTube.

== History ==
The old logo of RHTV from 2009 to 2013.

On October 1, 2007, DZRH-TV was originally launched as a pay television channel known as "TV Natin". Back then, its original programming consisted of archived DZRH programs (including radio dramas). In 2008 however, TV Natin evolved into a RadyoVision format, simulcasting most of DZRH's live programming schedule, and was eventually rebranded as RHTV. In October 2013, the network was rebranded again as "DZRH News Television" as part of the radio station's integration of its news and public affairs division.

DZRH News Television logo from 2013 to 2021.

Between October 2 and November 10, 2019, DZRH News Television went off the air after its studios, along with its sister MBC Manila radio stations, were affected by a major fire that originated in the nearby Star City theme park. While DZRH radio resumed regular programming at the following day (October 3) at 4 am from its backup studios at BSA Twin Towers, the station's video feed for DZRH News Television was temporarily replaced by the station's live audio feed; however, the live video streaming of DZRH's programming is available on Facebook live on the station's FB page. The channel returned on air on November 26, when DZRH has moved again to the Design Center of the Philippines within CCP Complex on November 11 and its satellite feed was restored.

Prior to the 82nd anniversary of its radio counterpart, on June 30, 2021, the station launched a new simplified logo and branding as DZRH TV, but the channel is still known as DZRH News Television. On November 15, 2021, the channel updated its new on-screen graphic presentation and slogan "Sama-Sama Tayo, Pilipino!" (lit Let's Be Together, Filipinos!) along with the new logos of all MBC radio stations. Most of its programs also launched their new title card.

On December 17, 2021, DZRH News Television and its sister station DZRH returned to the MBC Building with new brand new studios for both radio and TV operations.

== Programming ==
DZRH News Television airs the live video feed of DZRH programs, except selected radio dramas, the religious radio program Tinig ng Pagasa and during sign-off. It signs off every Sunday from 12:00 am to 4:00 am PHT and during Holy Week from Maundy Thursday to Black Saturday, thus showing its logo without audio instead. However, in 2022, it began simulcasting NHK World-Japan during the sign-off hours of its radio counterpart every week 4 hours on Sundays. On November 16, 2025, DZRH TV operates from 3:00 AM to 11:00 PM on Weekdays, from 2:00 AM to 11:00 PM on Saturdays and from 4:00 AM to 11:00 PM on Sundays.

== DZRH News TV stations ==
In addition to its current TV stations in Bacolod, Cebu, and Iloilo, MBC has announced plans to expand the reach of digital television broadcasting for DZRH News Television to other major areas nationwide, including Mega Manila.

== See also ==
- MBC Media Group
- DZRH
- Radyo Natin
- Pacific Broadcasting System
