= DZRH =

Radio station in Metro Manila, Philippines

- Logo of DZRH since 2021
- Pasay; Philippines
- Broadcast area: Mega Manila and surrounding areas
- Frequency: 666 kHz
- Branding: DZRH

Programming
- Language: Filipino
- Format: News, Public Affairs, Talk, Drama
- Affiliations: DZRH News Television

Ownership
- Owner: MBC Media Group
- Sister stations: DZRH TV; 90.7 Love Radio; 96.3 Easy Rock; 101.1 Yes FM

History
- First air date: July 15, 1939
- Former call signs: KZRH (1939–1948)
- Former frequencies: 650 kHz (1939–1978)
- Call sign meaning: Radio Heacock (former branding)

Technical information
- Licensing authority: NTC
- Class: A (clear frequency)
- Power: 50,000 watts
- Transmitter coordinates: 14°43′25″N 120°57′06″E
- Repeaters: See DZRH stations

Links
- Webcast: Live Stream
- Website: www.dzrh.com.ph

DZRH (666 AM) is a radio station owned and operated by MBC Media Group. The station’s studios are in the first floor, MMG Building, Star City, V. Sotto Street, CCP Complex, Roxas Boulevard, Pasay City, with its transmitter along I. Marcelo Street, Barangay Malanday, Valenzuela City. The station broadcasts nationwide via relay stations across the Philippines.

Established on July 15, 1939, DZRH is the oldest privately owned radio station, and the second-oldest radio station in the Philippines after state-owned DZRB.

== History ==
=== Early years: The Heacock era (1939–41) ===
DZRH began operations as KZRH (Voice of the Philippines) on July 15, 1939, at 6:00 a.m., from the top of the H.E. Heacock Building in Escolta, Manila, with Hal Bowie as its first announcer. It had been established by American businessman Samuel "Sam" Gaches, president of H. E. Heacock Company, one of the largest department store chains in the Pacific region. Aside from Gaches, an all-American staff was also led by Bertrand "Bert" Silen, station manager; and Johnny Harris, program director; both who formerly worked at KZRM.

It was the city's fourth commercial radio station and the company bought Cebu-based KZRC in 1940. Both were among the six Philippine-based stations operating prior to the Japanese occupation. (Note: Other pre-war radio stations in the Philippines in operation were: KZRM Radio Manila (Established by Radio Corporation of the Philippines [RCP] in Sept. 1927; ownership later transferred to Erlanger and Galinger Inc. in 1931 and to Far Eastern Radio Broadcasting Corporation in 1938.); KZRF Radio Filipinas (Established by Erlanger and Galinger in June 1932 as KZEG; owned by Far Eastern since 1938 and was renamed in 1939.); KZIB (Established by Isaac Beck Inc. in Nov. 1925.); KZRC Radio Cebu, then the only commercial station in Cebu City (Established by RCP in 1929 as a relay of KZRM; owned by Erlanger and Galinger since 1931.); KZND – National Defense, then the only government station.)

Beginning as the company's mouthpiece in its early years, KZRH broadcast musical variety shows, comedy skits, and brief newscasts, as well as jazz and ballad music. Also, a quarter-hour blocktime was given to advertisers. The station was later improved with transition from English to Filipino while its facilities were modernized and enlarged as its transmitting power later increased from one to ten kilowatts. KZRH eventually became the city’s leading radio station.

KZRH was used by the Americans to inform the listeners of steps to prepare for the impending Japanese invasion. It was the first to break news of the Japanese attack on Pearl Harbor in Honolulu, Hawaii, on December 7, 1941 (December 8 in the Philippines). It also gave updates on the ongoing Second World War in Europe reaching the Far East.

=== During the Japanese occupation (1942–45) ===
At the outbreak of the Japanese invasion of the country during the Second World War, the radio station was separately operated by the resistance group and by the invading forces who later eventually took over it. The station, being the only one remained and survived the war, became the country's oldest existing.

==== Voice of Freedom (1942) ====
With the possible Japanese invasion of Manila, at the end of 1941 Gen. Douglas MacArthur, Commander of the United States Army Forces in the Far East (USAFFE), ordered the destruction of radio equipment to avoid being used by the invaders. KZRH's remaining equipment were brought to Corregidor and a makeshift station built; it resumed broadcasts on January 5, 1942 as the resistance station Voice of Freedom.

Its announcers included: Carlos P. Romulo, journalist and former general manager of the KZRM–KZRF network; Leon Ma. Guerrero and Army Lt. Norman Reyes, both formerly with KZRM; and Army Lt. Francisco Isidoro, who acted as a translator. Guerrero and then-ambassador Salvador P. Lopez worked as writers. On the other hand, pre-war KZRH Chinese technician (naturalized Filipino, postwar) Simeon Cheng, and American chief engineer, United States Army Capt. Ted Ince, managed the station, with Cheng occasionally smuggling transmitter parts from Manila.

The station, anchored by former KZRM announcer Reyes, continued solo with its pro-Allied programming. It reportedly broadcast MacArthur's "I shall return" message from Australia. Its final broadcast was on April 9 via shortwave transmitter, with the "Bataan has fallen" announcement written by Lopez and its translation in Tagalog by Isidoro, both announced by Reyes.

Its operations ultimately ceased in May with the surrender of Allied Forces. Ince, who was also an announcer, and Reyes were later forced by the Japanese occupiers to work for Radio Tokyo overseas, and Guerrero was sent to Japanese-seized KZRH. The remaining staff were later killed, joined resistance guerrilla forces, or brought to Bataan and internment camps at the University of Santo Tomas and Los Baños.

==== Under Japanese control and as PIAM (1942–45) ====
The Imperial Japanese Army, upon entering Manila on January 2, 1942, immediately rebuilt those what was left by KZRH. On January 14, they went on the air, keeping the call letters but with different programming. Its power was reverted to 1 kW. Relay stations were later installed in Cebu, Baguio, Davao and Legazpi. The Japanese Military Administration ordered in July the prohibition of listening to broadcasts other than those from Japan and of KZRH which, by year-end and throughout the remaining years of the Japanese invasion, became the only operating Philippine-based station. (Note: Stations operating during the Second World War were Japanese-controlled KZRH/PIAM and resistance stations Voice of Freedom and Voice of Juan dela Cruz, both existed only in 1942. The first two were remnants of pre-war KZRH.)

It was on May 25, 1942, when USAFFE commander, Lt. Gen. Jonathan Wainwright, announced the fall of Corregidor and surrendered to the Japanese Imperial Forces through the station.

On October 14, 1943, it was rebranded PIAM (Note: PIAM stood for either Philippine Islands A Manila or Philippine Islands AM. Meanwhile, PIBC is Philippine Islands B Cebu; PICD, Philippine Islands C Davao; and PIDI, Philippine Islands D Iloilo.) by the Imperial army, being operated by the Department of Information through the newly-renamed Philippine Broadcasting Management Bureau, and becoming a tool for the Second Republic's propaganda. It had relay stations in Cebu, Iloilo, and Davao; the first two produced their own programming.

Majority of Filipinos there were forcibly recruited by the Japanese; some were later able to continue gathering intelligence for the guerillas. Among those journalists, aside from Guerrero, were former KZND manager Vero Perfecto, Fidela Magpayo, Filipino–American Yay Panlilio, and (future National Artist) Hernando R. Ocampo.

The station was used for promotion of both the Filipino and Japanese languages and cultures; however, did not gain much listeners. After almost three years of existence, its facilities were later destroyed by the Americans prior to the liberation of the Philippines.

=== The birth of MBC; expansion of DZRH ===
After the liberation, Silen, upon his release, sought help from the National Broadcasting Company in New York, United States, for transmitters, making the station the first to have a link with the company to the Far East. Meanwhile, it took forty days to erect a new studio on the top floor of the Insular Life Building in Plaza Cervantes. The Elizalde family, through brothers who were managing the Manila Broadcasting Company—its founder Manolo and Joaquin Miguel, acquired KZRH and then financed its operations.

KZRH, along with what would be DZPI, its sister station since 1949, had its operations revived on July 1, 1946; and covered the July 4 inaugural ceremonies for the new Republic and for Manuel Roxas as its first president.

In 1949, coinciding with its 10th anniversary, the station, bearing the pre-war tagline, was relaunched at 650 kHz and with 10-kW power. It was the country's first to broadcast simultaneously at AM and shortwave frequencies, almost nationwide.

Prior to the end of the decade, the International Telecommunication Union passed an act that changing the call signs for the Philippine stations, replacing the first letter with "D" to avoid confusion with those from United States; "DZ" stands for Luzon-based stations. With such order adopted by the government, KZRH became DZRH.

Station logo from 2003 to 2021

In the first post-war years, DZRH initiated first local shows sponsored by Philippine Manufacturing Company, which later boosted advertising, one was Kuwentong Kapitbahay (lit. transl. "Neighborhood Stories") — the first Tagalog soap opera. The station first used live programming.

The station further developed in the following decades which was the golden years of radio. Radio dramas debuted in 1949 with Lina Flor's Gulong ng Palad (lit. transl. "Wheel of Fortune"). The station held distinctions being the first to air a live quiz contest (Spell to Win) and to produce a Balagtasan program. It also produced variety programs.

DZRH produced some known personalities including sportscaster Willie Hernandez and commentator Rafael Yabut. Meanwhile, Magpayo became known as Tiya Dely, and was with the station at the time of her death in 2008.

Radio drama is one of the traditions of Philippine radio before the rise of television industry and continues until today this time on the FM band (only Ito ang Palad Ko!; "This is my fate", one of the longest-running drama anthology series from 1973-2020).

=== Martial Law era ===
In 1972, when then-President Ferdinand Marcos declared Martial Law, DZRH was temporarily closed for a few months; it was reopened but only under strict government censorship. It was the only other time in DZRH's history since the Second World War that the station's broadcast operations were interrupted. Upon resumption of broadcasts, DZRH (along with sister stations DZMB and DWIZ) gained a new studio complex at North Bay Boulevard, Navotas and San Francisco del Monte, Quezon City.

In November 1978, DZRH migrated from 650 kHz to the current frequency of 666 kHz due to the switch of the Philippine AM bandplans from the NARBA-mandated 10 kHz spacing to the 9 kHz rule implemented by the Geneva Frequency Plan of 1975. (Note: Despite its assignment to its permanent frequency by the National Telecommunications Commission, DZRH deliberately avoids mentioning the 666 kHz frequency during the station's broadcast day (except sign-on and sign-off notices) and on their official branding as the frequency number is associated with the mark of the beast, as written in the book of Revelation 13:18.) In the same year, DZRH launched Operation Tulong ("Help"), a socio-civic organization that helps the people in time of need.

By late 1970s, DZRH, competing with other stations, aired eighteen radio drama programs over nine hours daily.

In February 1986, the station covered the controversial snap elections and the ensuing People Power Revolution that peacefully deposed President Marcos and President Corazon Aquino's eventual accession.

=== Post-People Power Revolution ===
Following the 1986 revolution, commentators in the station rose into prominence, among them Orly Mercado, Jarius Bondoc, Alvin Capino, and Ka Louie Beltran.

During the series of coup attempts against the administration of Corazon Aquino; then news director Rey Langit played a key role in the on-air mediation with rebel soldiers.

In 1988, DZRH moved from the former studio in Navotas and Quezon City to its new studio location at FJE Building, Esteban Street, Legazpi Village, Makati.

In 1989, DZRH celebrated its 50th (golden) anniversary by launching "50 Taon ng Radyo" (lit. transl. "50 Years of Radio") on July 23; ceremonies and events were held at Rizal Memorial Stadium and Araneta Coliseum included parades, games, concerts, as well as outdoor and indoor fireworks displays.

In 1991, radio veteran Joe Taruc joined the station, where he hosted Damdaming Bayan which is now the longest-running public affairs program, as well as a morning newscast. Aside from being a newscaster, he was also station manager, and later, Senior Vice-President until his death in September 2017.

In October 1991, DZRH once launched a contest with fifty pairs of shoes as a prize to listeners who could correctly predict the date of return of former First Lady Imelda Marcos, whose ban had been lifted by president Corazon Aquino. Within three days, more than a hundred entries were personally delivered through letters; as the station also received calls, even from as far as Alaska and England, asking about the contest.

In the 1990s, upon the initiative of MBC chairman Fred Elizalde, DZRH, through a "One Nation, One Station" initiative, expanded its coverage to 97% of the entire country through satellite Palapa B4 which sending signals to twenty relay stations nationwide. It has now the widest reach; and held the distinction being the country's only station airing 24/7 on stereo-quality.

In July 2002, DZRH, along with other MBC stations, transferred from FJE Building in Makati, to its current studios at MBC Building, Vicente Sotto Street, CCP Complex on Roxas Boulevard, Pasay.

In October 2007, DZRH once again ventured into television broadcasting with the launch of TV Natin which renamed DZRH RadyoVision in 2008 (which is not related to the now-defunct VHF TV station DZRH-TV Channel 11), which was renamed RHTV in 2009 and DZRH News Television in 2013. It is also the first cable channel to broadcast via Facebook Live by mirroring the live stream of DZRH News Television to the Facebook servers.

In 2009, DZRH celebrated its 70th anniversary by launching "Fiesta Sitenta" as well as the launch of its first-ever theme song commissioned for the station. In the final quarter of 2011, DZRH did changes in their programming line-up as well as the adoption of the new slogan "RH Agad!" (transl. "RH right now"). In 2012, DZRH launched its new slogan, "Ang Makabagong Bayanihan" (transl. "The New Spirit of Cooperation") and also includes the station's current theme song (still heard in the station IDs of the station up to this day).

DZRH celebrated its Diamond Jubilee on July 15, 2014, at the Manila Hotel with the launching of the coffee-table book and the special commemorative stamp courtesy of PhilPost. In 2015, DZRH celebrated its 76th anniversary with the theme 76 Taon ng Balita at Serbisyo (lit. transl. "76 years of News and Service"). In 2016, DZRH celebrated its 77th anniversary with the theme "77 Years: Serbisyong tapat sa inyo" (lit. transl. "Service Loyal to You"). In 2017, DZRH celebrated its 78th anniversary with the theme "78 taon ng Tamang Balita at Tamang Serbisyo sa Bawat Pilipino" (lit. transl. "78 Years of Right News and Right Service to Every Filipino"). In 2018, DZRH celebrated its 79th anniversary with the theme "Walong Dekada ng Tamang Pagbabalita at Tamang Paglilingkod" (lit. transl. "Eight Decades of Right News and Right Service").

In October 2018, DZRH again aired its classic top-of-the-hour ID (which was launched on January 1, 1999, featuring the voice of Nick de Guzman) on a one-off airing basis, although the 2012 "Ang Makabagong Bayanihan" station ID continues to air on a regular basis. On the same month, DZRH reused its old slogan, "DZRH: Ang Kaunaunahan sa Pilipinas" (lit. transl. "DZRH: The First in the Philippines") in preparations for the 80th anniversary of the station in 2019. The said classic top-of-the-hour ID was re-introduced and became permanent in 2022, during the 83rd anniversary of the station.

On October 2, 2019, the studios of DZRH in the MBC Building, along with its sister MBC Manila radio stations, were affected by a major fire that originated in the nearby Star City theme park, prompting the station to suspend regular programming. In the interim, DZRH broadcasts from its backup studio in BSA Twin Towers, where the transmitters of its FM counterparts are located, where it played automated music throughout the day. Regular programming resumed the following day (October 3) at 4 am PHT, with video streaming for the station's social media accounts and simulcast nationwide satellite relay feed restored later; but the audio live streaming and DZRH News Television channel for cable, DTH and regional digital TV remained off air until November 26 only on TV. On November 11, DZRH moved its studio at Design Center of the Philippines, situated near the MBC Building across Vicente Sotto Street.

In March 2020, DZRH temporarily suspended its regular programming, especially radio dramas and DZRH News Television programs, in line with the enhanced community quarantine imposed by President Rodrigo Duterte due to the COVID-19 pandemic, which replaced them with news updates; radio dramas would again return to the station after a few months of hiatus.

On November 15, 2021, DZRH, alongside sister stations, launched their new logos and its new corporate slogan, Sama-Sama Tayo, Pilipino! (lit. transl. Let's Be Together, Filipinos!). On December 17, 2021, DZRH returned to the MBC Building with brand new studios for both radio and TV operations.

On February 6, 2024, coinciding the renaming to MBC Media Group, DZRH received a new ident based on old 1970s ident before albeit modified and digitized.

== Incidents ==
On November 23, 2009, DZRH correspondent Henry Araneta was among 32 media workers killed in the Maguindanao Massacre while covering an election event. Members of the Ampatuan family were convicted in 2019 for the killings.

On June 10, 2024, one of its radio reporters, Val Gonzales, was allegedly attacked by jeepney drivers associated with transportation group Manibela while covering a protest outside the Land Transportation Franchising and Regulatory Board (LTFRB) office in Quezon City. Gonzales claimed that he was punched on the side and the drivers rushed towards him because he was reporting the truth. DZRH station manager Rudolph Steve Jularbal stated that the network will file charges against individuals engaged in the punching of their reporter. He referred to the incident as "harassment."

During campaigning for the 2025 Philippine general election in April, Joseph Bernos, the mayor of La Paz, Abra, was accused of threatening DZRH correspondent Romeo Gonzales for his reporting on a shooting incident between local candidates in Abra.

== Notable on-air personalities ==
- Anthony Taberna
- Cesar Chavez
- Cory Quirino
- Jesus Crispin Remulla
- JV Ejercito
- Lisa Macuja-Elizalde
- Teodoro Locsin Jr.

== Ratings ==
As of the fourth quarter of 2022, DZRH is the most-listened-to AM radio station in Metro Manila, ranking number one among news radio stations. This data is based on a survey commissioned by Kantar Media Philippines, Nielsen, and Kapisanan ng mga Brodkaster ng Pilipinas.

As of the third quarter of 2025, DZRH is the most-listened-to AM radio station in Metro Manila, ranking number one among news radio stations. This data is based on a survey commissioned by Kantar Media Philippines, Nielsen, and Kapisanan ng mga Brodkaster ng Pilipinas.

== See also ==
- DZRH News Television
