= Inquirer Group of Companies =

Filipino media company

- Type: Private
- Industry: Mass media
- Founded: 1985
- Headquarters: Makati, Philippines
- Key people: Marixi Rufino-Prieto (chairperson)
- Services: Print publication, Digital media, Broadcasting, Radio, Television
- Owner: Pinnacle Printers Corporation (68.9%); Excel Pacific Holding Corporation (25%); Mercedes Rufino-Prieto (6.1%)
- Website: inquirer.com.ph

Inquirer Holdings Incorporated (also known as the Inquirer Group of Companies) is a mass media conglomerate based in Makati, Philippines with the Philippine Daily Inquirer as its flagship brand. The company is majority-owned by Pinnacle Printers Corporation, the holding investment arm of the Rufino-Prieto matriarch.

== List of properties owned by the Inquirer Group ==
=== Newspapers ===
- Philippine Daily Inquirer
- Inquirer Bandera
- Cebu Daily News (Cebu; ceased print publication on December 30, 2018, but continues to publish news online as CDN Digital)
- Inquirer Libre
- Tumbok (now defunct since 2007 - 2008)
- Junior Inquirer (defunct since 2018)
- Inquirer Compact (defunct since 2007)

=== Magazines ===
Hinge Inquirer Publications (HIP), formerly Hinge Media Inc. (HMI), was established in 2003.

- F&B World
- MultiSport
- Cocoon
- Look
- Baking Press
- Turista
- Game!
- Scout
- PBA Life
- Baby
- Northern Living
- Southern Living
- Cebu Living
- Makati Leads
- Soul BGC
- Inquirer RED

=== Inquirer.net ===
Inquirer Interactive Inc., better known as Inquirer.net, is the official website of the Philippine Daily Inquirer. It provides comprehensive coverage of both local and international news throughout the site's channels: News, Entertainment, Lifestyle, Technology, Business, Global Nation, and its recently relaunched Sports channel, which includes the official homepage of the Philippine Basketball Association.

=== Broadcasting ===
Trans-Radio Broadcasting Corporation
- Type: Subsidiary
- Country: Philippines
- Founded: 1971 by Emilio Tuason
- TV stations: Inquirer 990 Television
- Radio stations: DZIQ 990
- Headquarters: Makati
- Broadcast area: Mega Manila, surrounding areas
- Owner: JCMWell Radio Holdings Corporation
- Parent: Inquirer Group of Companies
- Key people: Paolo Rufino Prieto (president)
- Official website: radyo.inquirer.net

Trans-Radio Broadcasting Corporation is a radio company based in Makati. Founded in 1971 by Emilio Tuason, TRBC is the broadcasting arm of the Inquirer Group.

Radyo Inquirer (DZIQ 990 kHz Manila) is the radio station of the Philippine Daily Inquirer, with its broadcast team semi-independent of the main paper editorial team as it is mostly composed of career radio people. Its first terrestrial test broadcast on radio was on August 16, 2010, with Inquirer columnist Ramon Tulfo and broadcasting veteran Jay Sonza headlining the list of broadcasters for the new station.

Inquirer 990 Television is a teleradyo-formatted news channel of the Philippine Daily Inquirer currently broadcasting on digital terrestrial television. Programs from the main radio feed are simultaneously aired on the television channel. Inquirer 990 TV is also airing TV programs simulcast on the radio feed such as "Arlyn Dela Cruz Reports", "Radyo Inquirer 990 Special Report" and "Raw Talk".

Trans Radio used to operate DWRT-FM 99.5 in Manila as 99.5 RT from its launch in 1976 until 1996, and DYIO 101.1 in Cebu as Y101 from 1980 to the early 1990s.

In December 2020, the Inquirer Group announced the transition of Radyo Inquirer into a digital news site. DZIQ had already gone off-air in March 2020, and its television counterpart shut down on December 31, 2020. The closures were driven by pandemic-induced lockdown losses, poor ratings, and the expiration of the station's legislative franchise.

=== Megamobile ===
Founded in 2005, Megamobile is the online, mobile and outdoor solutions company of the Inquirer Group. Among its services are mobile application development, digital advertising, mobile value-added service and voice service.

Megamobile is the developer of the following mobile applications:

- Inquirer Mobile
- Bandera Mobile
- Inquirer Libre Mobile
- Cebu Daily News Mobile
- Inquirer 2BU
- Radyo Inquirer Mobile
- The Mind Museum Mobile (with Bonifacio Arts Foundation Inc.)
- Friend Trip (with MMDA)
- #popeselfie
- Ad Summit PH (with Association of Accredited Advertising Agencies of the Philippines (4As))
- APEC 2015
- PDS Skin (with the Philippine Dermatological Society)
- AgriBiz
- Viu Philippines (with PCCW Global)
