= DZIQ =

Defunct radio station in Metro Manila, Philippines

- Makati; Philippines
- Broadcast area: Mega Manila and surrounding areas
- Frequency: 990 kHz

Programming
- Format: Silent (formerly News and Talk)

Ownership
- Owner: Trans-Radio Broadcasting Corporation
- Sister stations: Inquirer 990 Television

History
- First air date: 1971
- Last air date: December 31, 2020
- Former call signs: DZTR (1960s-1976); DWWJ (1977-1985); DWRT-AM (1985–2010)
- Former names: Radyo Pilipino (1971-1976); DWWJ (1977-1985); 99 Rock (1985-1994); DWRT (1994-2002); Rock 990 (2006); Nueve Noventa (2008-2009); Radyo Inquirer (2010-2020)
- Former frequencies: 980 kHz (1971-1978)
- Call sign meaning: Inquirer

Technical information
- Licensing authority: NTC

Links
- Website: radyo.inquirer.net

DZIQ (990 AM) was a radio station owned and operated by Trans-Radio Broadcasting Corporation, the radio arm of the Philippine Daily Inquirer. It was formerly owned by the Tuazons under various incarnations from 1971 to 2010, when the Inquirer Group of Companies acquired the station.

== History ==
=== 1971-2009: Under the Tuazons ===
DZTR was acquired by Trans-Radio Broadcasting Corporation, a company newly established by the Tuazon family, from Transit Broadcasting Corporation in 1971. It was known as Radyo Pilipino with a music format. DZTR featured celebrities such as Vilma Santos, Tirso Cruz III, and German Moreno. On September 6, 1976, the station migrated to FM via 99.5 MHz.

In 1977, the frequency was utilized, this time under the call letters DWWJ. It was a full service station which aired oldies. In November 1978, DWWJ moved from 980 kHz to 990 kHz, in response to the adoption of the 9 kHz spacing on AM radio stations in the Philippines under the Geneva Frequency Plan of 1975.

In 1985, it changed its call letters to DWRT-AM and was relaunched as 99 Rock with an album rock format. A few years later, it shifted to a gospel format. In 1994, it was relaunched as simply DWRT with a news and talk format. It transferred to Caloocan. It went off the air in 2002.

In March 2006, the station went back on air as Rock 990 with a classic rock format. At that time, the studios were relocated to Makati. Its music formula started off as an experimental program on its Cebu's sister radio station Y101 as an inspiration by Martha Tuason, and eventually led into the decision to re-open this station. The station utilized a computer backed programming.

In the first week of November 2006, Rock 990 went off the air due to problems in its transmitter facilities.

In December 2008, the station went back on air as Nueve Noventa (Spanish for "nine-ninety"). It went on the air daily from 9:30 am – 5:00 pm, playing oldies and Original Pilipino Music, accompanied by a pre-recorded stinger saying, "Ito ang Trans-Radio Broadcasting Corporation ... Nueve Noventa!". During Christmas 2008, it aired information plugs about Christmas traditions in the Philippines, accompanied by a certain Christmas song. In April 2009, Nueve Noventa went off the air. It resumed broadcast briefly in July 2009 before going off the air again a couple of months later.

=== 2010-2020: Under the Inquirer Group ===
Former logo of Radyo Inquirer

In early 2010, the Inquirer Group of Companies acquired the frequency, as well as its owner, and changed its call letters to DZIQ. It was launched on May 10, 2010 online as Radyo Inquirer with a news and talk format, serving as the radio arm of the Philippine Daily Inquirer. It was located at the 2nd floor, Media Resources Plaza Building in Brgy. La Paz, Makati. Ciro Songco was the first station manager of Radio Inquirer during the early years. On August 16, Radyo Inquirer commenced transmissions on terrestrial radio by switching from an old 10,000-watt transmitter in Sta. Maria, Bulacan to its newly acquired 50,000-watt AM transmitter (imported from Canada) in Obando, Bulacan. It was officially launched on September 9.

In 2013, it underwent experimenting with the use of the English language in all of the programs of the station, similar to the current format of DZRJ 810 AM. The move was abandoned after about a year.

In May 2015, following the appointment of former ABS-CBN News veteran Jake Maderazo as Station Manager and former Eagle News Service anchor Arlyn dela Cruz as the station's News Manager, Radyo Inquirer adapted the taglines "Bayang Nagtatanong, Mamamayang Naguusisa" and "Balanseng Pagbabalita, Walang Takot na Pamamahayag".

Radyo Inquirer celebrated its 5th anniversary at the Resorts World Manila on September 9, 2015.

In March 2016, Radyo Inquirer launched their smartphone application. In May 2016, the "TeleRadyo"-formatted videostreaming channel of Radyo Inquirer began its broadcast via BEAM TV's digital subchannel, coinciding with the 2016 Philippine elections. In April 2018, the station gradually phased out the Radyo Inquirer brand after 8 years of usage.

In August 2018, the station launched its first station ID anthem Bayang Nagtatanong, Mamamayang Nag-uusisa. The lyrics of the anthem was composed by the station's news director Arlyn Dela Cruz and performed by the band Por Da Lab.

Sometime in 2020, during the community quarantine and after its legislative franchise to operate the station had lapsed, Radyo Inquirer went off terrestrial air. It continued its broadcasts online. The television counterpart ceased its broadcast at the end of 2020. The following year, Radyo Inquirer was relaunched as Radyo Inquirer On-Line, with some of its programs migrated to digital platforms.

== Notable on-air personalities ==
- Ramon Tulfo

== Awards and recognition ==
- Best AM Radio Station (Metro Manila) - 25th KBP Golden Dove Awards (2017)
