= DYAP =

DYAP may refer to the following Philippine radio stations:

- DYAP-FM, a radio station in Cebu City, Philippines. Branded as XFM.
- DYAP-AM, a defunct radio station in Puerto Princesa, Philippines.
