= DXDE =

DXDE may refer to:

- DXDE-FM, an FM radio station broadcasting in Tagum, branded as Juander Radyo
- DXDE-TV, a television station broadcasting in Zamboanga City, branded as One Sports
