= DWGE =

Radio station in Puerto Princesa, Philippines

XFM Palawan (DWGE)
- Puerto Princesa; Philippines
- Broadcast area: Palawan
- Frequency: 104.7 MHz
- Branding: 104.7 XFM

Programming
- Language: Filipino
- Format: Contemporary MOR, News, Talk
- Network: XFM

Ownership
- Owner: Subic Broadcasting Corporation
- Operator: Y2H Broadcasting Network

History
- First air date: October 2023

Technical information
- Licensing authority: NTC
- Power: 10 kW
- Repeaters: Roxas: 97.1 MHz; Cuyo: 97.9 MHz; El Nido: 91.5 MHz; San Vicente: 103.5 MHz; Coron: 89.9 MHz; Taytay: 98.5 MHz, 105.1 MHz; Roxas: 97.9 MHz, 98.5 MHz; Narra: 105.6 MHz; Brooke's Point: 93.5 MHz; Bataraza: 91.8 MHz; Quezon: 93.6 MHz; Rizal: 103.5 MHz

104.7 XFM (DWGE 104.7 MHz) is an FM station owned by Subic Broadcasting Corporation and operated by Y2H Broadcasting Network. Its studios and transmitter are located in Libis Rd., Brgy. San Pedro, Puerto Princesa, with repeaters located in various places in Palawan. Prior to moving to 104.7 in 2023, Subic Broadcasting formerly operated on 107.9.
