= Yes2Health Broadcasting Network =

Philippine broadcasting company

- Formerly: Yes2Health Advertising
- Type: Private
- Industry: Mass media
- Founded: February 28, 2022
- Headquarters: Tagum, Davao del Norte
- Key people: Remelito Y. Uy (President and CEO); Edwin S. Garing (General Manager)

Yes2Health Broadcasting Network (Y2HBN) is a Philippine media company with headquarters at Tagum. Y2H operates FM radio stations in the country under the XFM and Solid FM brands.

== History ==
The company began operations in 2021 when naturopathy doctor and Palawan-born entrepreneur Remelito Uy acquired the Xanthone Plus line of herbal products from the eponymous broadcast firm managed by his elder brother Ramel. Prior to the launch of Y2H's own radio operations, it produced blocktime programs discussing alternative medicine on various third-party AM and FM stations.

XFM began broadcasts on February 28, 2022 as a local entity when a group of mediamen led by Uy took over the operations of RMCBC-owned DXDE-FM in Tagum City. This formed the nucleus of the network until it transferred its broadcasting operations to Southern Broadcasting Network-owned DXSS-FM in Davao City later that year. After garnering initial success, XFM expanded into various provincial markets across the country by the use of airtime lease agreements.

== Properties ==
XFM Philippines
- Type: FM radio network
- Broadcast area: Philippines

Programming
- Language: Various Philippine languages
- Format: Contemporary MOR, OPM, News, Talk

Ownership
- Owner: Yes2Health Broadcasting Network (Yes2Health Advertising)
- Key people: Remelito Y. Uy (CEO); Olivine R. Uy (Vice President); Edwin S. Garing (General Manager)

History
- Launch date: February 28, 2022

Coverage
- Availability: Nationwide

Similar to K5 News FM, XFM also airs gospel music from sunset of every Friday until after sunset the next day under the Gospel Hour block due to the Uy family's affiliation with the Seventh Day Adventist Reform Movement.

=== XFM ===
Branding	Callsign	Frequency	Location	Owner
XFM Mega Manila	DWRT	99.5 MHz	Metro Manila	Real Radio Network
XFM Davao	DXBE	89.1 MHz	Davao	Quest Broadcasting
XFM Santiago	—N/a	104.9 MHz	Santiago, Isabela	Palawan Broadcasting Corporation
XFM Tuguegarao	—N/a	95.7 MHz	Tuguegarao	Palawan Broadcasting Corporation
XFM Southern Tagalog	DWCO	103.1 MHz	Candelaria	Christian Music Power
XFM Palawan	DWGE	104.7 MHz	Puerto Princesa	Subic Broadcasting Corporation
XFM Narra	—N/a	105.6 MHz	Narra	—N/a
XFM Brooke's Point	—N/a	93.5 MHz	Brooke's Point	—N/a
XFM Bataraza	—N/a	91.8 MHz	Bataraza	—N/a
XFM Quezon	—N/a	91.6 MHz	Quezon	—N/a
XFM Rizal	—N/a	103.5 MHz	Rizal	—N/a
XFM Cuyo	—N/a	97.9 MHz	Cuyo	—N/a
XFM San Vicente	—N/a	103.5 MHz	San Vicente	—N/a
XFM Coron	—N/a	89.9 MHz	Coron	—N/a
XFM El Nido	—N/a	91.5 MHz	El Nido	—N/a
XFM Iloilo	DYOZ	100.7 MHz	Iloilo	Global Broadcasting System
XFM Roxas	—N/a	106.5 MHz	Roxas	Christian Music Power
XFM Antique	—N/a	93.3 MHz	San Jose	Christian Music Power
XFM Kalibo	DYKB	96.5 MHz	Kalibo	DCG Radio-TV Network (Katigbak Enterprises)
XFM Bacolod	—N/a	103.9 MHz	Bacolod	Philippine Collective Media Corporation
XFM Bacolod	DYCP	90.3 MHz	Bacolod	Southern Broadcasting Network
XFM Bacolod	DYKR	96.7 MHz	Bacolod	DCG Radio-TV Network (Katigbak Enterprises)
XFM San Carlos	—N/a	98.9 MHz	San Carlos	Subic Broadcasting Corporation
XFM Sagay	—N/a	87.5 MHz	Sagay	GVM Radio/TV Corporation
XFM Kabankalan	—N/a	106.1 MHz	Kabankalan	GVM Radio/TV Corporation
XFM Escalante	—N/a	107.7 MHz	Escalante	—N/a
XFM Guihulngan	DYCI	92.9 MHz	Guihulngan	Christian Music Power
XFM Canlaon	—N/a	101.7 MHz	Canlaon	GVM Radio/TV Corporation
XFM Cebu	DYAP	88.3 MHz	Cebu	Southern Broadcasting Network
XFM Tacloban	DYTA	99.9 MHz	Tacloban	Wave Network
XFM Mati	DXIS	99.1 MHz	Mati	Subic Broadcasting Corporation
XFM Tagum	—N/a	107.1 MHz	Tagum	—N/a
XFM Kidapawan	—N/a	91.1 MHz	Kidapawan	Subic Broadcasting Corporation
XFM General Santos	DXPF	95.9 MHz	General Santos	Rizal Memorial Colleges Broadcasting Corporation
XFM Bayugan	—N/a	95.7 MHz	Bayugan	Capitol Broadcasting Center
XFM San Francisco	DXCV	91.3 MHz	San Francisco	Rizal Memorial Colleges Broadcasting Corporation
XFM Bukidnon	DXQE	101.7 MHz	Malaybalay	Rizal Memorial Colleges Broadcasting Corporation
XFM Pagadian	DXPX	89.5 MHz	Pagadian	Rizal Memorial Colleges Broadcasting Corporation
XFM Ipil	DXCW	92.7 MHz	Ipil	Christian Music Power
XFM Zamboanga	DXLA	99.5 MHz	Zamboanga	Global Satellite Technology Services

=== Solid FM ===
Branding	Callsign	Frequency	Location	Owner
Solid FM Palawan	DWJI	95.9 MHz	Puerto Princesa	DCG Radio-TV Network
Solid FM Cebu	DYBN	92.3 MHz	Cebu	Quest Broadcasting

=== Other stations ===
Branding	Callsign	Frequency	Location	Owner
Y101	DYIO	101.1 MHz	Cebu	GVM Radio/TV Corporation
Red Hot Radio	DXKX	91.5 MHz	Davao	Primax Broadcasting Network

Note: The above stations are owned by their respective broadcasting companies. Y2H operates them under an airtime lease agreement.

== Network programming ==
=== XFM News Nationwide ===
XFM News Nationwide
- Genre: News
- Running time: 30 minutes (2024–present)
- Country of origin: Philippines
- Language: Tagalog
- Home station: 104.7 XFM Palawan (2024–25); 99.5 XFM Mega Manila (2025–present)
- Hosted by: Buddy Oberas; Bryan de Paz
- Created by: Yes2Health Broadcasting Network Inc.
- Narrated by: Pedy Bautista-Sabando (2024–25); Jupiter Torres (2025–present)
- Original release: April 8, 2024 – present

XFM News Nationwide is the flagship network newscast of XFM. Produced by 99.5 XFM Mega Manila since July 3, 2025 and airing at 12:00 pm, it is currently anchored by Buddy Oberas and Bryan de Paz.

==== Development ====
XFM News Nationwide was first launched on April 8, 2024 across the network, replacing each station's local midday edition of XPress Balita. The newscast was originally aired at 12:30 pm with 104.7 XFM Palawan assuming its production and the tandem of Pedy Bautista Sabando and Aizy Pacaldo as its first anchors. Former 103.1 Brigada News FM anchor-reporter Gilbert Basio served as regular relief presenter for Sabando.

In January 2025, XFM News Nationwide was moved to 12:00 pm due to the decision of upper management to place The Secret of Health at the 12:30 pm slot as the newscast's lead-out program across its stations. Pedy Bautista Sabando would depart the program on March 7, 2025 as he ran and ultimately won the mayoralty race for Roxas, Palawan in the May 12, 2025 midterm elections. Aizy Pacaldo also went on maternity leave the same month, leaving Basio as sole reliever and eventual permanent main anchor until June 18th when she returned as co-anchor.

XFM Palawan continued production of the newscast until July 2, 2025 as its duties were transferred to the newly-launched 99.5 XFM Mega Manila the next day. Buddy Oberas and Kim Mangunay (both formerly of Abante Radyo 1494) served as the new co-anchors until Mangunay departed XFM on January 30, 2026 to concentrate on her family, she later returned to Abante Radyo. Bryan de Paz became her full-time replacement effective February 2, 2026.

==== Current presenters ====
- Buddy Oberas
- Bryan de Paz

==== Substitute presenters ====
- Jupiter Torres
- Melanie Ocampo (formerly with DZME)

==== Former presenters ====
- Pedy Bautista-Sabando (now-incumbent Mayor of Roxas, Palawan)
- Aizy Pacaldo
- Gilbert Basio (moved to 103.9 K5 News FM Palawan as its deputy station manager)
- Kim Mangunay

=== The Secret of Health ===
The Secret of Health
- Genre: Health news and consultation
- Running time: XFM; 1 hour(2022-present); Syndication; 30 minutes to 1 hour (2022-present)
- Country of origin: Philippines
- Languages: Tagalog; Bisaya
- Home station: Yes2Health remote studios, Unit 7 2F Crownland Building, 851 EDSA, Mother Ignacia Ave, South Triangle, Quezon City
- Hosted by: Drs. Algy Bacla, Mishael Gines and Ronald Paler
- Created by: Yes2Health Broadcasting Network Inc.
- Narrated by: Daniel Dularte
- Original release: March 1, 2022 – present

The Secret of Health (also branded as Kaalamang Pangkalusgan or Kalusugan Iwas Karamdaman) is the flagship health news and discussion program of Yes2Health, hosted by doctors of naturopathy Algy Bacla, Mishael Gines and Ronald Paler. The program is heard on XFM radio stations as an hour-long live consultation show from Mondays to Fridays at 12:30 PM after XFM News Nationwide and on Sundays at 11:00 am.

Aside from XFM, the program also airs a separate syndicated edition through third-party AM and FM networks, such as on RMN's DZXL 558 (nightly at 9:00 pm), IBMI's DWWW 774 (30-minutes on weeknights at 9:00 pm and Sundays at 11:00 am, coterminus with XFM), MBC's DZRH (30-minutes every Sunday at 8:30 pm), MBC's Radyo Natin (through various affiliates), AWR 89.1 (every Saturday at 4:00 pm), PCMC's DZMM Radyo Patrol 630 and DZMM TeleRadyo (every Sunday at 4:00 am and delayed telecast on PRTV Prime Media at 6:00 am), and was previously heard on GMA's Super Radyo DZBB (30-minutes every Sunday at 9:00 pm).
