= DXSS =

DXSS is the callsign of two defunct stations of Southern Broadcasting Network in Davao City, Philippines:

- DXSS-FM (97.9 FM)
- DXSS-TV (channel 7)
