= DXBE-FM =

Radio Station in Davao City

XFM Davao (DXBE)
- Davao City; Philippines
- Broadcast area: Metro Davao and surrounding areas
- Frequency: 89.1 MHz
- Branding: 89.1 XFM

Programming
- Languages: Cebuano, Filipino
- Format: Contemporary MOR, News, Talk
- Network: XFM
- Affiliations: Newsline Philippines

Ownership
- Owner: Quest Broadcasting Inc.
- Operator: Y2H Broadcasting Network Inc.
- Sister stations: Through Y2H: 91.5 Red Hot Radio

History
- First air date: December 1991
- Former call signs: DXTM; XFM: DXSS (2022–2026)
- Former names: Killerbee (December 1991-March 27, 2013); Magic 89.1 (April 2013-January 2025); Solid FM (February 2025-May 22, 2026)
- Former frequencies: XFM: 97.9 MHz (2022–2026)
- Call sign meaning: Killerbee (former branding)

Technical information
- Licensing authority: NTC
- Class: C, D, E
- Power: 10,000 watts
- Repeater: Mati: DXIS 99.1 MHz

Links
- Website: XFM 97.9 Davao Katropa Digital

DXBE (89.1 FM), broadcasting as 89.1 XFM is a radio station owned by Quest Broadcasting Inc. and operated by Y2H Broadcasting Network Inc. It serves as the flagship station of XFM Philippines. Its studio and transmitter are located along Broadcast Ave., Shrine Hills, Brgy. Matina Crossing, Davao City.

== History ==
=== 1991-2024: As Killerbee/Magic ===
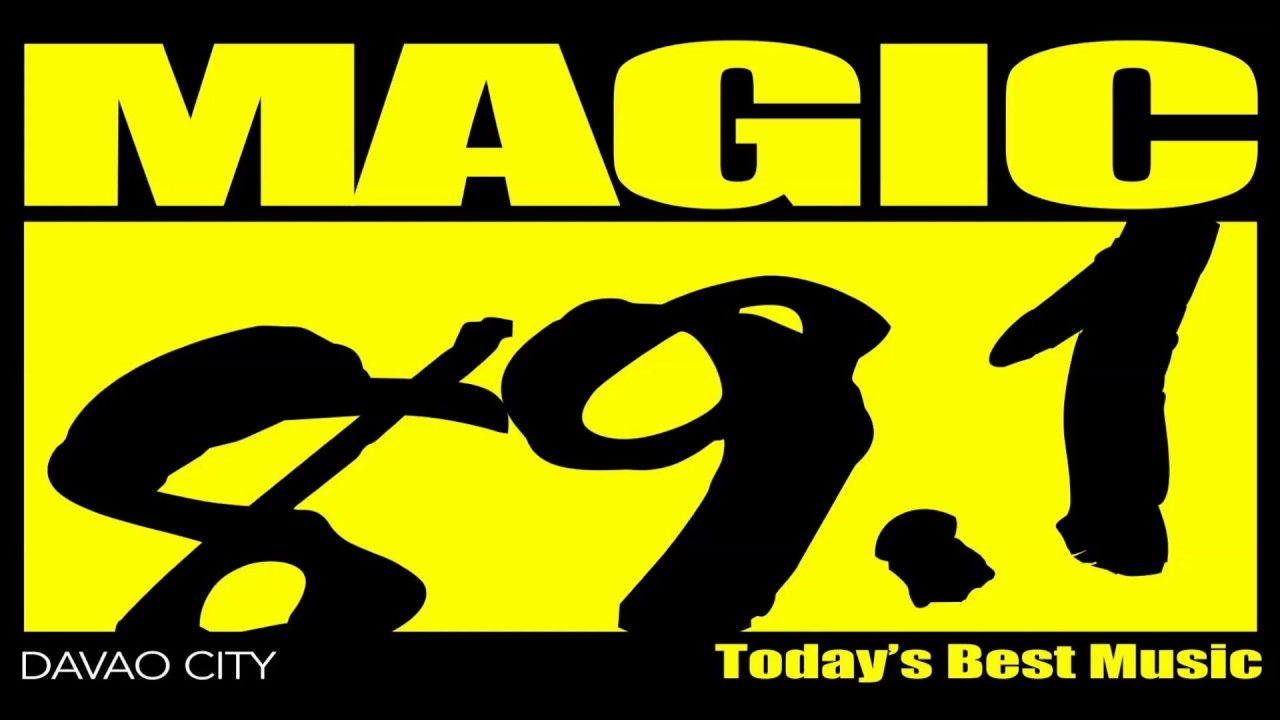
Magic 89.1 (2013 - 2025)

The station was formerly known as Killerbee 89.1 from its inception in December 1991.

On March 27, 2013, this station, along with the other Killerbee stations, were relaunched under the Magic moniker (adopted from its parent station) by April 29, 2013. In January 2025, it quietly went off-air.

=== 2025-present: Under Y2H ===
On late February 2025, the station returned on air under the management of Y2H Broadcasting Network Inc. that runs 97.9 XFM. Initially, it aired automated music with commercials from Y2H products. A few weeks later, it began to use the branding Solid FM.

On May 23, 2026, XFM Davao transferred its operations to this frequency. It used to be broadcast on 97.9 FM owned by Southern Broadcasting Network from its inception in 2022 to 2026.
