= Isagani Yambot =

Filipino journalist (1934–2012)

Isagani M. "Gani" Yambot (November 16, 1934 – March 2, 2012) was a Filipino journalist who served as the publisher of the Philippine Daily Inquirer from 1994 until his death in 2012.

Yambot was born in Tagbilaran City, Bohol, in 1934. Both his parents were teachers: his mother taught science while his father taught English and mathematics. The family moved to Manila, settling in the Tondo district. He studied at the University of the Philippines, where he earned a degree in liberal arts. He earned a fellowship to the Washington Journalism Center. His first job in journalism was at the now closed Manila Times, which he joined in 1953. He remained with the newspaper, covering both Malacañan Palace and the Philippines' Senate. He left the Manila Times, taking a position as a night editor for United Press International (UPI) in 1973. In 1974, Yambot joined the former Times Journal, serving as that newspaper's managing editor from 1983 until 1985.

From 1981 to 1982, Yambot worked as a press attaché for the Philippines' Ambassador to Saudi Arabia, Benjamin Romualdez, in Jeddah. He served as the press attaché for the Embassy of the Philippines in Washington, D.C. from 1985 to 1986. Upon his return to the Philippines from his diplomatic posting in Washington, Yambot joined the Malaya newspaper as its managing editor in 1988.

Yambot became an editor at the Philippine Daily Inquirer in April 1989, remaining at that daily newspaper for the rest of his career. He was named executive editor and, in June 1991, associate publisher. He became publisher of the Daily Inquirer in February 1994. In 1999, major advertisers who supported former Philippine President Joseph Estrada organized a five-month-long boycott of the Philippine Daily Inquirer. Yambot denounced the boycott as politically motivated.

He was awarded the Outstanding News Editor award from the College Editors Guild of the Philippines in 1975. He won the Catholic Mass Media Award for Best In-Depth Article in 1994 and the Lakan Award for Outstanding Achievement in Journalism in 1995.

== Death ==
Yambot underwent quadruple bypass surgery in on February 21, 2012. He died of a heart attack on March 2, 2012 in Pasig aged 77. He was survived by his wife, Mildred, and six children.
