= DXKX =

Red Hot Radio (DXKX)
Simulcast of DYIO Cebu
- Davao City; Philippines
- Broadcast area: Metro Davao and surrounding areas
- Frequency: 91.5 MHz
- Branding: 91.5 Red Hot Radio

Programming
- Format: Top 40 (CHR), OPM

Ownership
- Owner: Primax Broadcasting Network
- Operator: Y2H Broadcasting Network Inc.
- Sister stations: Through Y2H: 89.1 XFM

History
- First air date: 1995
- Former names: K91 (1995–1998); Citylite (1998–2000); Smooth FM (2000–2013); Brigada News FM (2015–2024)

Technical information
- Licensing authority: NTC
- Power: 10,000 watts

DXKX (91.5 FM), on-air as 91.5 Red Hot Radio, is a radio station owned by Primax Broadcasting Network and operated by Y2H Broadcasting Network. It is currently a simulcast of Y101 in Cebu. Its relay transmitter is located along Broadcast Ave., Shrine Hills, Brgy. Matina Crossing, Davao City.

== History ==
=== 1995–2013: K91/City Lite/Smooth FM ===
The station was established in 1995 as K91 with an Adult Top 40 format. In 1998, it became an affiliate of Raven Broadcasting Corporation in Manila and rebranded as City Lite 91.5 with a smooth jazz format. In early 2000, after it ended its affiliation with RBC, it rebranded as Smooth FM 91.5. Sometime in 2013, it went off the air due to financial constraints.

=== 2015–2024: Brigada News FM ===
In early 2015, Brigada Mass Media Corporation took over the station's operations and relaunched it under the Brigada News FM network. Its old transmitter was replaced with a new 10,000-watt transmitter from Quark Electronics of Italy.

Regular programming began on August 10, 2015, followed by a grand launching party coinciding with the 30th Kadayawan Festival on August 23. Then-incumbent Davao City Mayor (now Vice President) Inday Sara Duterte, Brigada Group of Companies President Elmer Catulpos, and other Brigada officials were present in the occasion.

In January 2024, as part of transition ahead of the expiry of Brigada's lease with Primax, 93.1 FM began simulcasting this frequency. The said frequency is among Mareco's properties leased by Brigada as part of their agreement made last June 2023.

On March 17, 2024, upon Brigada News FM Davao's shift of its full-time operations to 93.1 FM, this frequency continued to operate as a repeater of the latter, albeit with limited broadcast hours (signing off every 10:00 am). On April 14, Brigada News FM Davao aired a special tribute for the entire day, commemorating its decade-long service on this frequency, ending at 12:00 midnight the following day with its final song "Farewell" by Raymond Lauchengco.

In July 2024, it returned on air, this time airing automated music with limited broadcast hours (6:00 am to 6:00 pm). By late September 2024, it went off the air.

=== 2026-present: Under Y2H ===
On May 26, 2026, it returned on air, this time under the management of Remelito Uy's Y2H Broadcasting Network. On July 9, after two months of in-house automated music, the station began simulcasting Y101 based in Cebu as Red Hot Radio.
