= Inquirer 990 Television =

Philippine terrestrial TV news channel

- Network: Trans-Radio Broadcasting Corporation
- Headquarters: Makati City, Philippines

Programming
- Picture format: 720p HDTV (downscaled to 480i for the SDTV feed)

Ownership
- Owner: Philippine Daily Inquirer

History
- Launched: May 9, 2016; 10 years ago
- Closed: December 31, 2020; 5 years ago
- Replaced by: Knowledge Channel (BEAM TV channel space)

Inquirer 990 Television was a Philippine terrestrial television news channel owned by Trans-Radio Broadcasting Corporation (a subsidiary of the Philippine Daily Inquirer).

It was the television counterpart of radio news station DZIQ 990, broadcasting in the AM band and was the fifth station to simulcast its radio stream to television, after DZMM (DZMM TeleRadyo and PRTV Prime Media), DZRH (DZRH TV), DWAN (DWAN 1206 TV), DZRJ (Radyo Bandido TV), DWIZ (ALIW Channel 23 and DWIZ News TV), DZRB (Radyo Pilipinas 1 Television), DZRV (Radyo Veritas TeleRadyo), Abante Radyo 1494 (Abante TV), DZME 1530 (DZME Radyo TV) and 105.9 True FM (One PH and True TV). Originally on live streaming, it became available as a terrestrial subchannel on BEAM TV, and some programs are also available on analog free TV Channel 31.

Aside from the main programming feed from its radio counterpart, Inquirer 990 TV also aired its exclusive original programs.

== Notable on-air personalities ==
=== Current ===
- Rhommel Balasbas
- Fernan De Guzman
- Dona Dominguez-Cargullo
- Ed Dural
- Noel Ferrer
- Den Macaranas
- Ira Panganiban
- Jupiter Torres
- Louie Sebastian
- Kilay
- Jake Maderazo
- Joel Aba
- Mamey France Simeon
- Jonas Virtudazo
- Ervin Santiago
- Izel Abanilla
- Jose Boy Romero
- Rev. Jerome Quinto
- Liza Soriano
- Susan K
- Joey Austria
- Cristina Caoile
- JC Kwads
- Rex Navarrete

=== Correspondents ===
- Erwin Aguilon
- Jan Escosio
- Angellic Jordan
- Chona Yu
- Rohanissa Abbas
- Alvin Barcelona
- Ricky Brozas
- Maria Elena Salinas (US Correspondent)
- Mariel Cruz
- Cyrille Cupino
- Isa Avendaño-Umali
- Clarize Austria
- Reysie Amado
- Tere Gonzales
- Len Montaño

=== Former ===
- Arlyn Dela Cruz-Bernal†
- Jay Dones
- Aida Gonzales
- Arnell Ignacio
- Cecille Lardizabal
- Mark Makalalad
- Jong Manlapaz
- Ruel Perez
- Justinne Punsalang
- Kristine Sabillo
- Girlie Sevilla
- Jay Sonza
- Joee Guilas
- Ramon Tulfo
- Noel Talacay
- Rod Lagusad
- Atty. Persida Acosta

== See also ==
- DZIQ
- Philippine Daily Inquirer
- Abante TV
- DZMM TeleRadyo
- Radyo Bandido TV
- DZRH News Television
- Aliw Channel 23
- GMA News TV (now GTV)
- One PH
