= DYCP =

Radio station in Bacolod, Philippines

XFM Bacolod (DYCP)
Relay of 103.9 XFM
- Bacolod; Philippines
- Broadcast area: Northern Negros Island, parts of Iloilo and Guimaras
- Frequency: 90.3 MHz
- Branding: 103.9 XFM

Programming
- Languages: Hiligaynon, Filipino
- Format: Contemporary MOR, News, Talk
- Network: XFM

Ownership
- Owner: Southern Broadcasting Network
- Operator: Y2H Broadcasting Network, Inc.

History
- First air date: 1993
- Former names: DYCP (1993–2001, 2010-2015); Music Now (2001–2003); Mom's Radio (2003–2010, 2015-2018); XStream FM (2022–2023); Solid FM (2023–2024)

Technical information
- Licensing authority: NTC
- Class: C, D, E
- Power: 10,000 watts
- ERP: 32,000 watts

DYCP (90.3 FM) is a radio station owned by Southern Broadcasting Network and operated by Y2H Broadcasting Network, Inc. It serves as a mirror feed of 103.9 XFM. Its transmitter is located at Puentebella Subdivision, Brgy. Taculing, Bacolod.

== History ==
- First broadcast in 1993 as DYCP 90.3.
- In 2001 the station rebranded as Music Now with a Top 40 format.
- In late 2003, the station became Mom's Radio 90.3. Dedicated to the mothers and mother-to-be listeners in Bacolod.
- In 2010, it reverted to DYCP 90.3 with limited broadcast time.
- In November 2015, Mom's Radio 90.3 returned on air, this time via satellite from Manila.
- In February 2018, Mom's Radio stations went off the air due to financial constraints.
- In November 2022, shortly after Y2H Broadcasting Network took over its operations, the station returned to the air as XStream FM, airing a mass-based music format to complement its forthcoming sister station 96.7 XFM (which runs a hybrid news & music format). A year later, it rebranded as Solid FM with a Soft AC format.
- November 18, 2024 - it became a simulcast of 96.7 XFM.
- July 18, 2025 - XFM Bacolod fully transferred its operations to 90.3 FM with its former frequency downgraded to a mirror feed of the latter; hence rebranded the station as 90.3 XFM.
- April 2026 - XFM Bacolod shifted its operations to 103.9 FM. Meanwhile, the frequency was kept as a mirror feed of the latter, along with 96.7 FM.
