= DYBN =

Radio station in Cebu City, Philippines

Solid FM Cebu (DYBN)
- Cebu City; Philippines
- Broadcast area: Metro Cebu and surrounding areas
- Frequency: 92.3 MHz
- Branding: Solid FM 92.3

Programming
- Languages: Cebuano, Filipino
- Format: Soft adult contemporary
- Network: Solid FM

Ownership
- Owner: Quest Broadcasting Inc.
- Operator: Y2H Broadcasting Network
- Sister stations: through Y2H: 88.3 XFM; Y101

History
- First air date: April 19, 1992
- Former names: Killerbee (April 19, 1992–April 26, 2013); Magic (April 29, 2013 – December 27, 2024); Uy FM (January 22 – March 17, 2025); X92 (DYIO simulcast; May 18 – September 14, 2025)
- Call sign meaning: Bee Nation (former name)

Technical information
- Licensing authority: NTC
- Class: ABC
- Power: 10,000 watts

DYBN (92.3 FM), broadcasting as Solid FM 92.3, is a radio station owned by Quest Broadcasting Inc. and operated under an airtime lease agreement by Y2H Broadcasting Network, Inc. The station studio and transmitter facilities are located at the BSP Camp, Capitol Hills, Brgy. Lahug, Cebu City.

== History ==
=== 1992–2024: Killerbee/Magic ===
Former Killerbee 92.3 Cebu logo from April 19, 1992 to April 26, 2013.

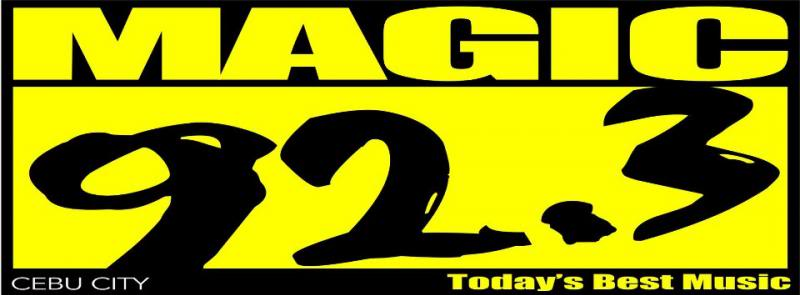
Former Magic 92.3 Cebu logo from April 29, 2013 to December 27, 2024.

The station first signed on the air on April 19, 1992 as Killerbee 92.3. It carried a Top 40 format with the tagline "Music Mix is Simply Better".

The station was initially located at the Cebu Plaza Hotel (now Marco Polo Plaza Cebu) along Lower Nivel Hills from its inception until 2006, when it relocated to its current location at the BSP Camp along Capitol Hills (shared facilities with 94.7 Energy FM until 2014; though its transmitter site remained there).

On April 26, 2013, Killerbee 92.3 officially signed off. As part of the rebranding of all Quest provincial stations to be aligned with its parent station, the station relaunched under the Magic moniker on April 29, 2013.

On December 27, 2024, Magic 92.3 quietly signed off for the last time.

=== 2025–present: Frequency takeover by Y2H ===
In January 2025, Y2H Broadcasting Network, a broadcast company of the Uy family, took over the station's operations after Quest agreed to sell airtime to the said company. Prior to this, Y2H already had presence in Cebu through 88.3 XFM and a shared sales agreement with Y101.

On January 22, the station went back on air under a test broadcast as Uy FM, airing automated music with commercials from Yes2Health products. On March 17, the station dropped the branding and started carrying the tagline "Something Hot, Something Red" as part of transition phase for a planned rebrand.

On May 18, 2025, the station began simulcasting Y101 as Red Hot X92, a nod to Y101's long-time branding.

On September 15, 2025, the station was launched as Solid FM 92.3 with a soft adult contemporary format.
