= DYTA =

Radio station in Tacloban, Philippines

XFM Tacloban (DYTA)
- Tacloban; Philippines
- Broadcast area: Northern Leyte, southern Samar
- Frequency: 99.9 MHz
- Branding: 99.9 XFM

Programming
- Languages: Waray, Filipino
- Format: Contemporary MOR, News, Talk
- Network: XFM

Ownership
- Owner: Wave Network
- Operator: Y2H Broadcasting Network
- Sister stations: Through Wave Network: 92.5 Groove FM Baybay

History
- First air date: 2017
- Former names: Trenz FM (2017–2019); Sunshine (2019–2021)
- Call sign meaning: Tacloban

Technical information
- Licensing authority: NTC
- Power: 5 kW
- ERP: 10 kW

99.9 XFM (DYTA 99.9 MHz) is an FM station owned by Wave Network and operated by Y2H Broadcasting Network. Its studios and transmitter are located along Maharlika St., Tacloban.

== History ==
The station was formerly known as 99.9 Trenz FM from 2017 to 2019 and Sunshine 99.9 under Local Community Outreach Philippines from 2019 to 2021, with studios located in Brgy. Marasbaras. On March 14, 2024, the station returned on air after Y2H Broadcasting Network took over management and rebranded it as XFM with a news and music format.
