= DYKR =

Radio station in Bacolod, Philippines

XFM Bacolod (DYKR)
Mirror feed of 103.9 XFM
- Bacolod; Philippines
- Broadcast area: Northern Negros Occidental and surrounding areas
- Frequency: 96.7 MHz
- Branding: 103.9 XFM

Programming
- Languages: Hiligaynon, Filipino
- Format: Contemporary MOR, News, Talk
- Network: XFM

Ownership
- Owner: DCG Radio-TV Network; (Katigbak Enterprises, Inc.)
- Operator: Y2H Broadcasting Network, Inc.

History
- First air date: 1993
- Former names: 96.7 WRocK (1993–2010)
- Call sign meaning: Inverted as WRocK (former branding)

Technical information
- Licensing authority: NTC
- Class: C, D, E
- Power: 10,000 watts
- ERP: 32,000 watts

DYKR (96.7 FM) is a radio station owned by DCG Radio-TV Network and operated by Y2H Broadcasting Network, Inc. It serves as a mirror feed of 103.9 XFM. Its transmitter is located at Puentebella Subdivision, Brgy. Taculing, Bacolod.

== History ==
The station was established in 1993 by Exodus Broadcasting Company as one of the provincial WRock stations. After its Manila flagship station was acquired by Manila Broadcasting Company on October 6, 2008, the station was relaunched as a separate entity from WRocK Online. In May 2010, due to lack of resources and financial challenges, WRocK Online, along with the station, went off the air.

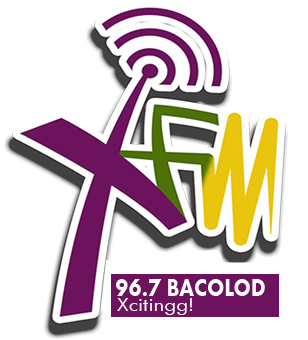
96.7 XFM Bacolod (2022–2025)

In 2020, DCG Radio-TV Network acquired the frequency from Exodus. In early 2022, Yes2Health Advertising took over the station's operations and began its test broadcast as XFM, carrying a news and music format. XFM Bacolod officially launched on April 4, 2022.

On November 18, 2024, the station transferred from MFC Bldg. in Lacson St. to Brgy. Taculing.

On July 18, 2025, after XFM Bacolod shifted its operations to 90.3 FM, the frequency was downgraded to a mirror feed of the latter.

In April 2026, after XFM Bacolod shifted its operations to 103.9 FM, the frequency was kept as a mirror feed of the latter, along with 90.3 FM.
