= Inquirer Compact =

Former newspaper in the Philippines

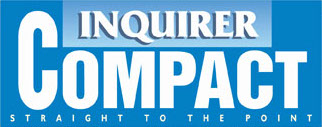

- The front page of the Inquirer Compact on November 9, 2006
- Type: Daily newspaper
- Format: Compact
- Owner(s): Philippine Daily Inquirer, Inc.
- Managing editor: John Nery
- Founded: November 14, 2005
- Ceased publication: April 29, 2007
- Political alignment: Independent
- Headquarters: Makati, Metro Manila, Philippines
- Sister newspapers: Philippine Daily Inquirer; Inquirer Libre

The Inquirer Compact was a newspaper in the Philippines published in the compact format. Published by the Philippine Daily Inquirer, it was the first attempt by a major Philippine broadsheet newspaper to launch a smaller compact edition which was not a tabloid. Although the newspaper was launched on November 14, 2005, it debuted during the Philippine Ad Congress held two weeks after on November 27 in Cebu City.

With articles published in this version of the Inquirer usually shorter than in the broadsheet due to space constraints, the Inquirer Compact had a strong regional orientation, with the paper being distributed only in major cities within the regions of mainland Luzon. The newspaper was not available in Metro Manila, where the Inquirer broadsheet and the Inquirer Libre tabloid were widely available, nor in the Visayas and Mindanao, where the Inquirer-owned tabloids Tumbok and Bandera already had strong sales. The Inquirer Compact was also cheaper than the broadsheet, selling for ₱10 in contrast to ₱18 (now priced at ₱20) for the Inquirer.

After 572 issues, the Inquirer Compact ceased publication on April 29, 2007, with some of the newspaper's final front pages being uploaded to Flickr by John Nery, the newspaper's final managing editor, as a tribute to its run.

== See also ==
- Inquirer Libre
- Philippine Daily Inquirer
