= DYAP-FM =

Radio station in Cebu City, Philippines

XFM Cebu (DYAP)
- Cebu City; Philippines
- Broadcast area: Metro Cebu and surrounding areas
- Frequency: 88.3 MHz
- RDS: XFM CEBU
- Branding: 88.3 XFM

Programming
- Languages: Cebuano, Filipino
- Format: Contemporary MOR, News, Talk
- Network: XFM

Ownership
- Owner: Southern Broadcasting Network
- Operator: Y2H Broadcasting Network, Inc.
- Sister stations: Through Y2H: Y101; 92.3 Solid FM

History
- First air date: 1988
- Former names: DYAP (1988–2001, 2010-2015); First FM (2001–2003); Mom's Radio (2003–2010, 2015-2018)

Technical information
- Licensing authority: NTC
- Power: 10,000 watts
- ERP: 32,000 watts
- Repeater: Guihulngan: DYCI 92.9 MHz

DYAP (88.3 FM), broadcasting as 88.3 XFM, is a radio station owned by Southern Broadcasting Network and operated by Y2H Broadcasting Network, Inc. The station's studio is located at Unit 5, 2nd floor, Z Plaza Bldg., Dionisio Jakosalem St., Brgy. Zapatera, Cebu City, and its transmitter is located at the SBN Compound, San Carlos Heights, Quiot Pardo, Cebu City.

== History ==
The station was established in 1988, airing an AOR format. At that time, its studio and transmitter were located at Crown Building along 6th Road, North Reclamation Area in this city.

In 2001, it rebranded as First FM 88.3 with an Adult Top 40 format.

In late 2003, the station rebranded as Mom's Radio 88.3 with a music and talk format targeting the mothers and mother-to-be. It transferred its studio to Krizia Bldg. along Gorordo Ave.

In 2010, it rebranded as simply DYAP, playing only a variety of music with limited broadcast time. It relocated to its transmitter site in San Carlos Heights.

In November 2015, Mom's Radio returned on air, this time via satellite from Manila under the management of Makati-based Estima, Inc. On February 25, 2018, all Mom's Radio stations went off the air due to financial constraints.

In September 2022, the station returned on air as XFM with a news and music format under the management of Y2H Broadcasting Network. It began test broadcast on January 26, 2023, along with a newly installed 10,000-watt transmitter from DB Elettronica of Italy for better signal reception in Metro Cebu and nearby islands.

On February 13, 2023, XFM Cebu launched its own slate of local programming.

On March 20, 2023, XFM Cebu was officially launched with a motorcade and a free concert at the Brgy. Cogon Ramos Gymnasium, featuring performances from Jay-R Siaboc and Rommel Tuico.
