= Margie Holmes =

Filipina psychologist and television host

Margarie Holmes
- Born: Margarita Go-Singco
- Education: University of the Philippines Diliman (AB); University of Hawaiʻi at Mānoa (MPH); Ateneo de Manila University (PhD)
- Occupations: Academic, Public Health Expert, Psychologist
- Known for: Specializing in sex therapy

Margarita Go-Singco Holmes, popularly known as Dr. Margie Holmes, is a popular psychologist specializing in sex therapy in the Philippines.

== Early life and education ==
Holmes graduated with a Bachelor of Arts degree in Psychology from the University of the Philippines Diliman in 1973. She was awarded a scholarship grant from the East West Center to study at the University of Hawaii at Manoa, where she earned a Master of Public Health with a major in international family planning, including special studies in sex therapy and marriage counseling.

Holmes capped her credentials with a Doctor of Philosophy in Clinical Psychology from Ateneo de Manila University. She was also elected into membership in the international honor societies of Phi Kappa Phi and Pi Gamma Mu.

== Career ==
=== Academic ===
She has lectured at the University of the Philippines, International School, San Carlos Seminary, Ateneo de Manila University and De La Salle University. She also served as a consultant in government and non-government organizations, notably the Population Center Foundation and the Department of Health. In addition to being a frequent lecturer and resource speaker to academic, corporate and socio-civic groups in the Philippines and overseas, she is also currently a professorial lecturer at the Graduate School of Psychology at the Pamantasan ng Lungsod ng Maynila.

=== Television hosting ===
Holmes created the first-ever Philippine-based show to deal with psychological issues, entitled No Nonsense with Dr. Holmes. She also hosted a segment, Magtanong Kay Dra. Holmes (Ask Dr. Holmes) which was broadcast twice weekly in Teysi ng Tahanan, a daytime talk-show primarily hosted by veteran comedian and impersonator Tessie Tomas.

Holmes is negotiating a cable show that will be broadcast in the Philippines, Hong Kong, Singapore, Guam, Saipan, Honolulu and California.

=== Writer ===
Holmes is a regular columnist at Abante, a popular tabloid, Business Mirror and Opinyon, all in Metro Manila. She has published 21 books to date. As a pioneer, she has written the first books in the Philippines to tackle controversial issues on sex and relationships, homosexuality and clinical depression. Along with her husband, Jeremy Baer, she has co-authored two books: “Love Triangles” and “Imported Love”. They have a weekly column entitled “Two-Pronged” in www.rappler.com, aside from her own column, “Walang Bolahan” for the tabloid, Abante. Her books and columns have been reviewed in international periodicals, such as Newsweek, Time, the Far Eastern Economic Review, Associated Press, Agence France Press, Asiaweek, Asia Magazine and the Philadelphia Inquirer.

== Selected works ==
- Passion, Power, Pleasure. Manila: Anvil Publications, 1991
- Magtanong Kay Dra Holmes. Manila: Anvil Publications, 1992
- Sexy Saucy Spicy. Manila: Anvil Publications, 1993
- Roles We Play in Family Life. Manila: Anvil Publications, 1993
- Magtanong Kay Dra. Holmes II. Manila: Anvil Publications, 1993
- A Different Love: Being Gay in the Philippines. Manila: Anvil Publications, 1994
- Buhay Babae. Manila: Anvil Publications, 1995
- Buhay Lalake. Manila: Anvil Publications, 1995
- Naiibang Pagibig: Ang Maging Bakla sa Pilipinas. Manila: Anvil Publications, 1996
- Buhay May Asawa. Manila: Anvil Publications, 1997
- Buhay Single. Manila: Anvil Publications, 1997
- Wild Wicked Wonderful. Manila: Anvil Publications, 2000
- Bad Bold Brazen. Manila: Anvil Publications, 2000
- Life Love Lust: Straightforward Answers to Provocative Questions. Manila: Anvil Publications, 2001
- Lalakeng Barako. Manila: Anvil Publications, 2001
- Babaeng Palaban. Manila: Anvil Publications, 2001
- Down to 1: Depression Stories. Manila: Anvil Publications, 2010
