= DXDE-FM =

Radio station in Tagum, Philippines

Juander Radyo Tagum (DXDE)
- Tagum; Philippines
- Broadcast area: Davao del Norte, Davao de Oro, parts of Davao City
- Frequency: 100.7 MHz
- Branding: 100.7 Juander Radyo

Programming
- Languages: Cebuano, Filipino
- Format: Contemporary MOR, News, Talk
- Network: Juander Radyo

Ownership
- Owner: Rizal Memorial Colleges Broadcasting Corporation
- Operator: RSV Broadcasting Network

History
- First air date: March 15, 2014
- Former names: One Radio (March 2014-December 2020); XFM (March 2022-October 2024)

Technical information
- Licensing authority: NTC
- Class: C, D, E
- Power: 5,000 watts

Links
- Webcast: juandertagum.ismyradio.com
- Website: juanderradyo.com

DXDE (100.7 FM), broadcasting as 100.7 Juander Radyo, is a radio station owned by Rizal Memorial Colleges Broadcasting Corporation and operated by RSV Broadcasting Network. Its studio and transmitter are located at Oesom Bldg., Sobrecary St, Brgy Poblacion, Tagum.

== History ==
The station was established on March 15, 2014, as One Radio under the Radyo ni Juan network. At that time, it was located at Purok Bautista, Brgy. Mankilam. On December 2, 2020, it, along with the other Radyo ni Juan stations, went off the air due to financial problems.

On March 1, 2022, the station went back on air, this time as XFM under the management of Dr. Remelito Uy's Y2H Broadcasting Network Inc. It moved to its present location in Villa Magsanoc Subdivision at the same barangay. It was initially an originating station until October 4, 2022, when it transferred its studios to Davao City. As a result, it was downgraded to a relay station of XFM Davao.

In May 2023, it was relaunched with its own local programming. It still simulcasts a handful of programs from XFM Davao.

On October 14, 2024, XFM Tagum moved to 107.1 FM, owned by Y2H, for better signal quality. Prior to this, the said frequency was formerly used by Hope Radio until the latter moved to 106.7 FM known as Radyo sa Paglaum (which later moved to 106.8 FM by early November).

On December 20, 2024, the frequency was relaunched under RSV Broadcasting Network's Juander Radyo.
