= Inquirer Bandera =

Philippine tabloid newspaper

- Type: Daily newspaper (1990–2020); Online newspaper (2020–present)
- Format: Tabloid
- Owner(s): Inquirer Publications, Inc.
- Founder(s): Ralph Chekeh; Danny Mariano; Ricky Agcaoili
- Publisher: Eileen Mangubat
- Editor: Dona Policar
- Associate editor: Jimmy Alcantara
- Founded: September 10, 1990; 35 years ago
- Ceased publication: July 5, 2020 (print edition)
- Political alignment: Independent
- Language: Filipino, Taglish (Bandera Luzon & Visayas); English (Bandera Mindanao)
- Circulation: Nationwide (Luzon, Visayas, Mindanao editions) (until 2020)
- Sister newspapers: Philippine Daily Inquirer, Inquirer Libre, Cebu Daily News
- Website: Bandera's website

Inquirer Bandera is a daily Taglish tabloid newspaper based in Metro Manila, Philippines. It is published by the Inquirer Publications, Inc with editorial and business offices located in Makati.

== History ==
Bandera (initially called the Metro Times) was first published on September 10, 1990 by Manila Times journalists, Ralph Chekeh, Danny Mariano and Ricky Agcaoili, with Lito Bautista as the pioneering managing editor (up to his retirement in 2014). It was then the sister newspaper of Manila Times under the Gokongwei family who acquired the broadsheet in 1989 from the Roces family. The tabloid's first head office was located at the Manila Times Compound in Quezon City before it was relocated to Mandaluyong. English was primarily used in its articles until they shifted to Tagalog in the 2000s.

Bandera was known for hosting erotic columns and Page 3 girls, among those featured were Rosanna Roces and Margie Holmes. It had three sister tabloids: the "raunchier" Bandera PM, Bandera Tonight, as well as Bandera International Edition which catered to Overseas Filipino Workers in Hong Kong and the Middle East.

In 2001, the Prieto family, owners of Philippine Daily Inquirer, acquired Bandera from the Gokongweis. During the acquisition Bandera ditched its sexualized content in favor of a more wholesome image.

Bandera, which had three editions specific for Luzon, Visayas and Mindanao, moved to an online only format after its last print issue was published on July 5, 2020. Bandera is published online through Inquirer Plus digital subscriptions.

== See also ==
- Philippine Daily Inquirer
- Inquirer Libre
