= Inquirer Libre =

Comapct bilingual newspaper in the Philippines

- The best things in life ay Libre (gratis)
- The Inquirer Libre issue depicting the G-Pass by Globe
- Type: Weekly newspaper
- Format: Tabloid
- Owner(s): Philippine Daily Inquirer, Inc.
- Editor-in-chief: Dona Policar
- Associate editor: Jimmy Alcantara
- Founded: November 19, 2001
- Ceased publication: October 6, 2017 (reformated as weekly newspaper)
- Political alignment: Independent
- Language: Filipino, English
- Headquarters: Makati, Metro Manila, Philippines
- Circulation: 110,000
- Sister newspapers: Philippine Daily Inquirer; Inquirer Compact; Inquirer Bandera
- Website: libre.inquirer.net

Inquirer Libre is a free, bilingual (Filipino and English) tabloid published in the Philippines by the Philippine Daily Inquirer as a trimmed-down version of the newspaper for distribution on public transport. Established on November 19, 2001, it is the Philippines' first and Asia's second-oldest free newspaper.

The newspaper is available in all stations of the LRT, MRT, and PNR, the Eva Macapagal Super Terminal at the Port of Manila's South Harbor, as well as selected branches of McDonald's. In 2011, a digital print edition was made available for subscribers of the Inquirer digital print subscription service.

Unlike other Philippine tabloids, Inquirer Libre seeks to provide commuters access to decent, useful and meaningful news and current events. The income generated from distributing Inquirer Libre comes from advertising.

On October 9, 2017, Inquirer Libre relaunched as a weekly commuter paper. It will be distributed every Monday. The new schedule also enabled it to follow the look and layout of its sister paper, the Inquirer.

Inquirer Libre hosted Inquirer Libre day, an event where everything is FREE (LIBRE) last May 18, 2019 at Ayala Malls Circuit. It was attended by over 10,000 people and enjoyed free food and concert (with Rox Puno, After 5 and Janine Tenoso in the line up).

== See also ==
- Philippine Daily Inquirer
- Gratis versus Libre
