= DXSS-FM =

Defunct radio station in Davao City, Philippines

DXSS
- Davao City; Philippines
- Broadcast area: Metro Davao and surrounding areas
- Frequency: 97.9 MHz

Programming
- Format: Silent

Ownership
- Owner: Southern Broadcasting Network

History
- First air date: 1977
- Last air date: May 23, 2026
- Former names: DXSS (1977–1995, 2010-2015); Music Now (1995–2002); Mom's Radio (2002–2010, 2015-2018); XFM (2022-2026)

Technical information
- Licensing authority: NTC

DXSS (97.9 FM) was a radio station owned by Southern Broadcasting Network. Its studio and transmitter are located at the SBN Compound, Broadcast Ave., Shrine Hills, Brgy. Matina Crossing, Davao City. It is considered to be pioneer FM station in the city.

== History ==
DXSS began its operations in 1977 as an affiliate of GMA Network. At that time, it aired an AOR format.

In 1995, GMA ended its partnership with SBN. As a result, the station rebranded as Music Now and switched to an Adult Top 40 format.

In 2002, the station rebranded as Mom's Radio and carried a "woman's radio" format - adult contemporary music and talk programs targeting the mothers and mothers-to-be. In 2010, the station reverted back to identifying simply with its callsign, operating on limited broadcast hours.

In November 2015, Mom's Radio returned on air, this time via satellite from Manila under the management of Makati-based Estima, Inc. On February 25, 2018, all Mom's Radio stations went off the air due to financial constraints.

In June 2022, the station returned on air, this time under the management of Y2H Broadcasting Network Inc., owned by Dr. Remelito Uy. At the onset, it initially served as a relay station of 100.7 XFM in Tagum.

On October 4, 2022, XFM Davao and XFM Tagum respectively swapped operational assets with the former becoming an originating station and the latter downgrading to a relay station of Davao. XFM Davao completed its full migration to an originating station on October 19, through a grand opening of its studios and offices at the SBN compound.

In early-2023, Davao-based independent news media outlet Newsline Philippines began blocktiming the station's late night slot for their flagship web newscast Newsline Evening News.

On May 23, 2026, XFM transferred to 89.1 FM owned by Quest Broadcasting, after the airtime lease agreement with SBN expired. The said frequency used to broadcast as Solid FM. This move left the station off the air again.
