= DYIO =

Radio station in Cebu City, Philippines

Y101 (DYIO)
- Cebu City; Philippines
- Broadcast area: Metro Cebu and surrounding areas
- Frequency: 101.1 MHz (HD Radio)
- RDS: Y101 Cebu
- Branding: Y101

Programming
- Language: English
- Format: Top 40 (CHR), OPM
- Subchannels: HD1: DYIO analog; HD2: Wicked Radio; HD3: Eskina Radio

Ownership
- Owner: GVM Radio/TV Corporation
- Operator: Y2H Broadcasting Network
- Sister stations: through Y2H: 88.3 XFM; 92.3 Solid FM

History
- First air date: March 1, 1980
- Call sign meaning: Y101

Technical information
- Licensing authority: NTC
- Class: A, B, C
- Power: 5,000 watts
- HAAT: 594 meters
- Repeater: Davao City: DXKX 91.5 MHz

Links
- Webcast: Listen live (via TuneIn)

DYIO (101.1 FM), broadcasting as Y101, is a radio station owned by GVM Radio/TV Corporation and operated under airtime lease and shared sales agreements by Y2H Broadcasting Network. The station's studio and transmitter are located at the BSP Camp, Capitol Hills, Brgy. Lahug, Cebu City.

== History ==
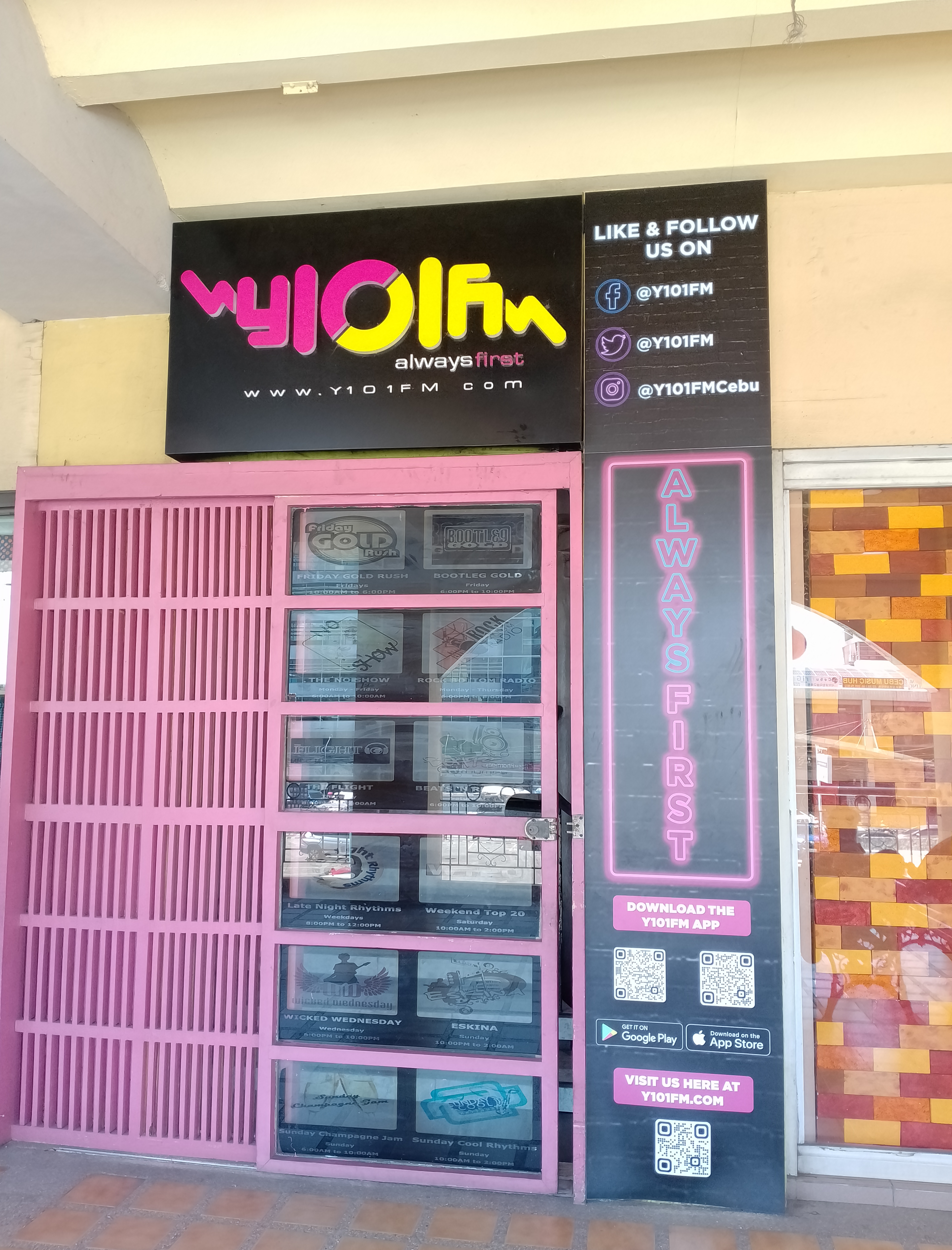
DYIO's former studio at the Gaisano Country Mall

DYIO began test transmissions in 1979 and made its inaugural broadcast on March 1, 1980. At that time, it was under the ownership of Emilio Remedios Tuason's Trans-Radio Broadcasting Corporation, the original owner of Manila-based 99.5 RT, and carried the iconic slogan "The Rhythm of the City". The station's first home was at Danaque Building along Osmeña Blvd. Tuason and his cousin Binggoy Remedios were among the station's first personalities.

In 1990, Y101's ownership was transferred to GVM Radio/TV Corporation, owned by Emilio's sister Martha. It also adapted the slogans "Always First" and "Red Hot Radio" in March 2023. By 2000, it moved to the 2nd Floor of Gaisano Country Mall in Banilad.

In 2024, GVM struck an airtime lease and shared sales-marketing agreement with Dr. Remelito Uy's Y2H Broadcasting Network, the operator of 88.3 XFM, whose frequency is owned by Southern Broadcasting Network.

In April 2025, Y101 moved to the BSP Camp, which houses erstwhile rival 92.3 FM, whose operations were taken over by Y2H back in January. Further changes were implemented on the station, such as the addition of the Saturday gospel music block The Light on Y101, mirroring XFM's Gospel Hour.

92.3 FM simulcasted Y101 as Red Hot X92 from May 18 to September 15, 2025, when it was relaunched as 92.3 Solid FM.

On July 9, 2026, 91.5 FM based in Davao City began simulcasting Y101 under the Red Hot Radio branding.
