= Philippine Daily Inquirer =

Broadsheet newspaper in the Philippines

- Balanced News, Fearless Views

- Front page from December 11, 2019
- Type: Daily newspaper
- Format: Broadsheet
- Owner(s): Philippine Daily Inquirer, Inc. (1985–2025); Inquirer Interactive, Inc. (2025–present)
- Founders: Eugenia D. Apostol; Betty Go Belmonte; Max Soliven
- Publisher: Juliet L. Javellana
- President: Paolo R. Prieto
- Editor: Joseph Voltaire L. Contreras
- Associate editor: Raul O. Marcelo
- Managing editor: Robert Jaworski L. Albaño
- News editor: Dewey Joseph G. Yap
- Opinion editor: Juliet L. Javellana
- Photo editor: Remar Zamora
- Founded: December 9, 1985; 40 years ago (14,895 issues)
- Political alignment: Centre-left
- Language: English
- Headquarters: Media Resource Plaza Building, 2530 Mola corner Pasong Tirad Streets, La Paz, 1204, Makati, Metro Manila, Philippines
- City: Makati
- Country: Philippines
- Circulation: 1,979,000
- Readership: 47.12%
- Sister newspapers: Inquirer Bandera, Inquirer Libre, Cebu Daily News
- ISSN: 0116-0443
- Website: www.inquirer.net

The Philippine Daily Inquirer (PDI), or simply the Inquirer, is an English-language newspaper in the Philippines. Founded in 1985, it is often regarded as the Philippines' newspaper of record. The newspaper is the most awarded broadsheet in the Philippines and the multimedia group, called The Inquirer Group, reaches 54 million people across several platforms.

== History ==
The Philippine Daily Inquirer was founded on December 9, 1985, by publisher Eugenia Apóstol, columnist Max Solivén, together with Betty Go-Belmonte during the last days of, and becoming one of the first private newspapers to be established under the Marcos regime.

The Inquirer succeeded the weekly Philippine Inquirer, created in 1985 by Apostol to cover the trial of 25 soldiers accused of complicity in the assassination of opposition leader Ninoy Aquino at Manila International Airport on August 21, 1983. Apostol also published the Mr. & Ms. Special Edition, a weekly tabloid opposed to the Marcos regime.

=== Beltran years (1985–1989) ===
As the successor to the previous Mr. & Ms. Special Edition and the weekly Philippine Inquirer, it was founded on a budget of ₱1 million and enjoyed a daily circulation of 30,000 in its early days. The new daily was housed in the dilapidated one-story Star Building at 13th and Railroad streets in Port Area, Manila. It was put out by 40 editors, reporters, correspondents, photographers and other editorial employees working in a 100-square-meter newsroom. Columnist Louie Beltran was named its editor-in-chief.

The newspaper was instrumental in documenting the campaign of Corazon Aquino during the 1986 presidential elections and, in turn, the 1986 People Power Revolution. Its slogan, Balanced News, Fearless Views, was incorporated to the newspaper in January 1986 after a slogan-making contest held during the first month of the Inquirer's existence. In this period, the newspaper reached a high circulation of 500,000 copies a day.

In July 1986, questions about finances and a divergence of priorities caused a rift among the founders that led Belmonte, Soliven, and Art Borjal's split from the Inquirer to establish The Philippine Star. As Belmonte owned the Star Building where the Inquirer was headquartered, the newspaper amicably transferred to the Soliven-owned BF Condominium on Aduana Street, Intramuros.

=== Pascual years (1989–1991) ===
In February 1987, Federico D. Pascual, former assistant managing editor of the Daily Express, was named executive editor of the Inquirer and was appointed editor-in-chief two years later. It was during his term in 1990 that the Inquirer took the lead from the Manila Bulletin to become the Philippines' newspaper with the highest circulation.

However, in July 1990, the Inquirer headquarters in Intramuros was damaged by the 1990 Luzon earthquake. On January 5, 1991, the newspaper transferred to the YIC building along United Nations Avenue and Romualdez Street in Malate.

=== Jimenez-Magsanoc years (1991–2015) ===
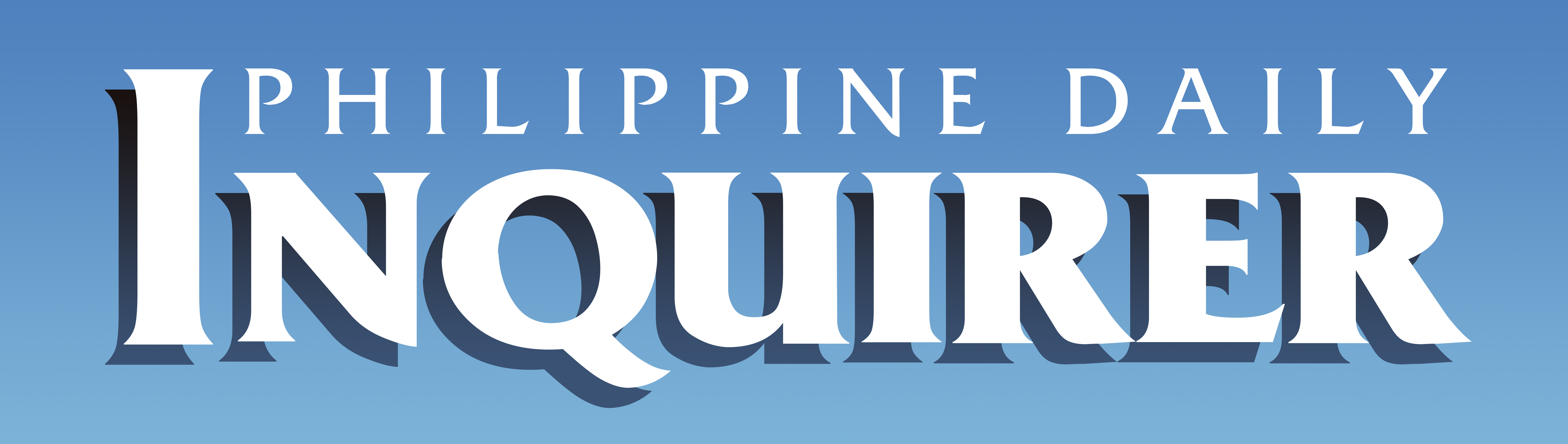
PDI logo prior to the 2016 relaunch

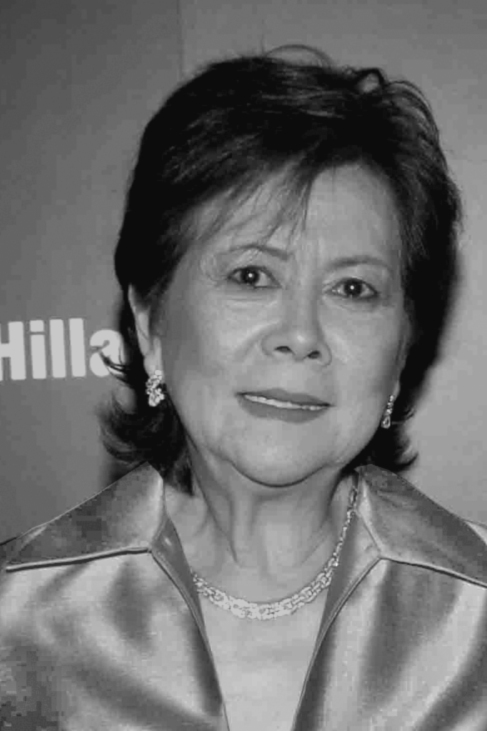
Letty Jimenez Magsanoc, the Inquirer's editor-in-chief from 1991 until her death in 2015

Inquirer's longest-serving and first woman editor-in-chief, the late Letty Jimenez-Magsanoc, was appointed on June 14, 1991. She was a former columnist and editor of the Panorama Sunday magazine of Bulletin Today (now Manila Bulletin) who was sacked for writing articles poking fun at Marcos. She edited Mr & Ms Special Edition until the fall of the Marcos regime. She was also the first editor-in-chief of Sunday Inquirer Magazine.

Under her term, on January 12, 1995, the Inquirer moved to its current headquarters in Makati after transferring headquarters four times.

President Joseph Estrada accused the Inquirer of "bias, malice, and fabrication" against him, charges that the newspaper denied. In 1999, several government organizations, pro-Estrada businesses, and movie producers simultaneously pulled their advertisements from the Inquirer in a boycott that lasted for five months. Malacañang Palace was widely implicated in the advertising boycott, which publisher Isagani Yambot denounced as an attack on the freedom of the press.

In 2017, according to the survey conducted by AGB Nielsen, the Inquirer was the most widely read newspaper in the Philippines. The Manila Bulletin and The Philippine Star followed as the second and the third most widely read papers, respectively. Magsanoc died on December 24, 2015, at St. Luke's Medical Center in Taguig. A month after her death, Jimenez-Magsanoc was recognized as the Filipino of the Year 2015 by the Inquirer.

=== Nolasco years (2016–2018) ===
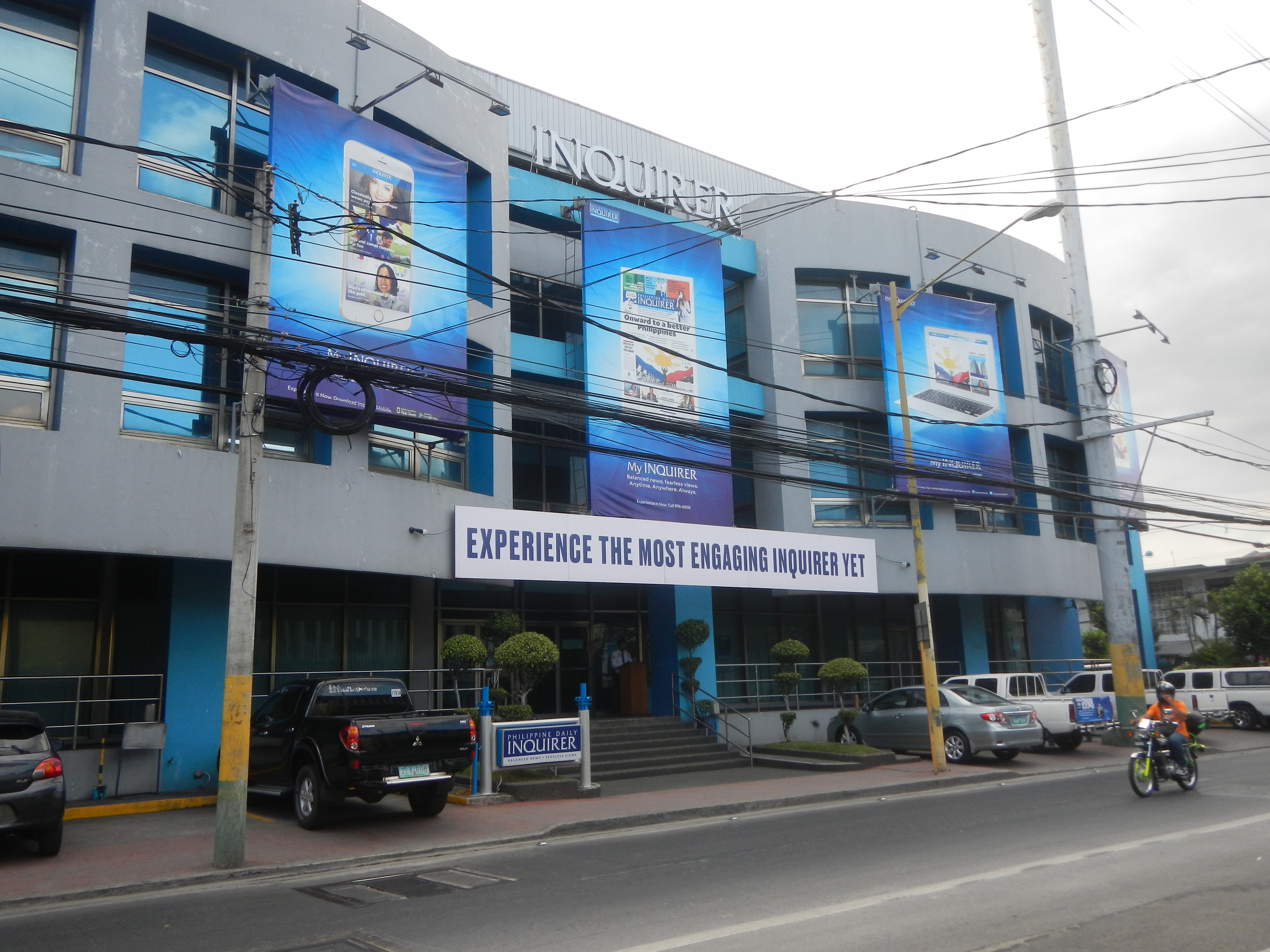
Philippine Daily Inquirer headquarters in Makati

On February 2, 2016, the Inquirer appointed its managing editor Jose Ma. Nolasco as the executive editor, the new top position of the newspaper, replacing the traditional editor-in-chief position used by the Inquirer for more than three decades.

In 2017, Ramon S. Ang bought out the shares of the divesting Prieto family and became the majority shareholder at 85%, followed by Manny Pangilinan having the remaining 15%.

The Inquirer runs a subsidiary publication titled Pop!, focusing on popular and Internet culture. On October 1, 2024, it dissolved the Entertainment section and merged it with the Lifestyle section.

On July 1, 2025, the Inquirer integrated its print and digital operations. The print edition which was formerly under Philippine Daily Inquirer, Inc. (PDII - will be shutting down operations entirely as a company) will be now owned and managed under formerly digital-only Inquirer Interactive, Inc.. These two legal entities are under the same group of companies/ultimate beneficial owners - the Prieto-Rufino family, and thus ultimately there is no change of ownership & management that occurred.

== Readership ==
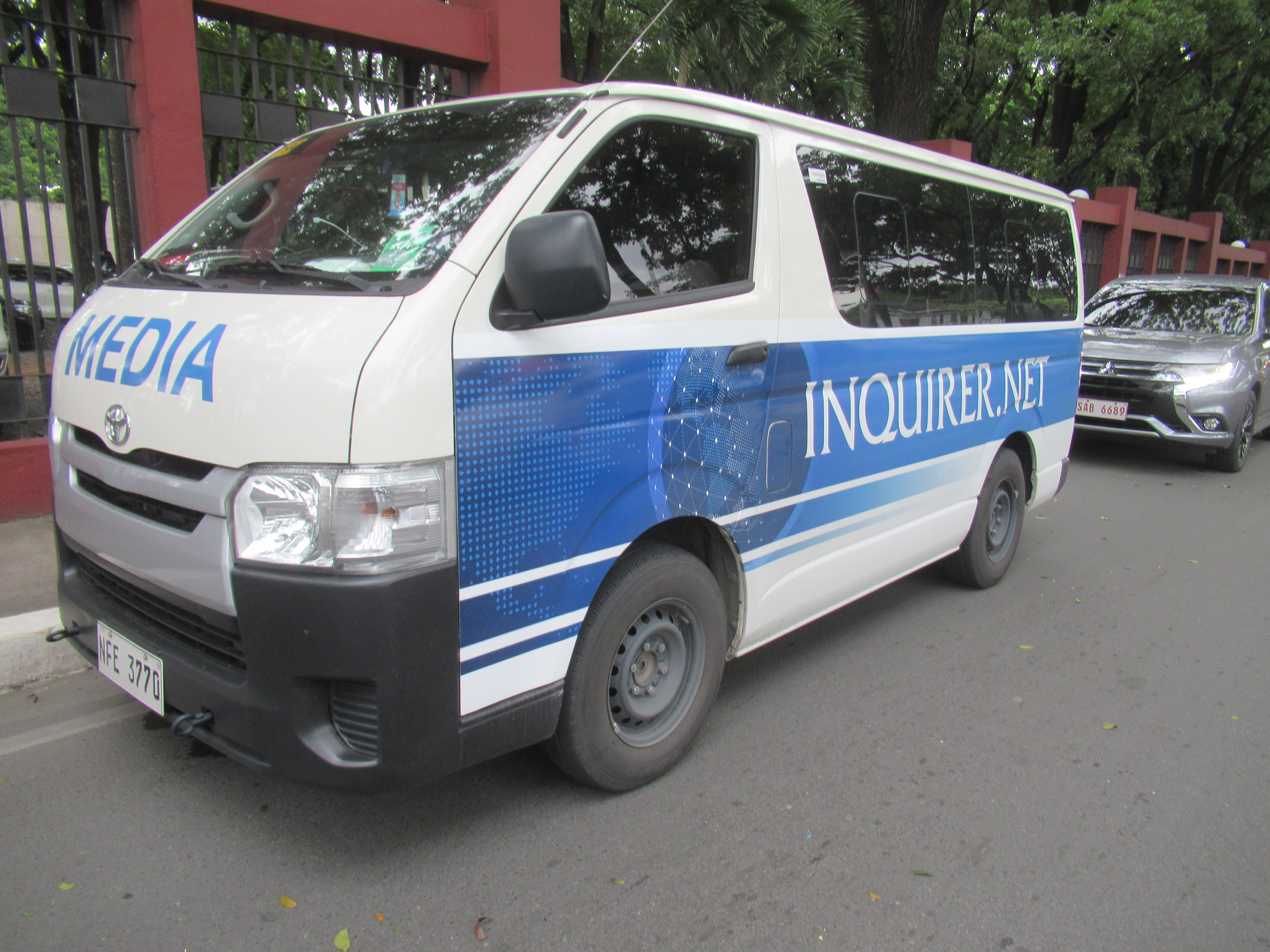
Inquirer.net broadcasting vehicle

According to the company's website the newspaper has over 2.7 million nationwide readers daily, it enjoys a market share of over 50% and tops the readership surveys.

== Reputation ==
The Philippine Daily Inquirer was considered as one of the trusted news sources among Filipinos in 2022, with a trust rating of 65% according to the Reuters Institute. In the 2023 Digital News Report by Reuters Institute, the trust rating rose to 68%, making it one of the most trusted broadsheets in the country. The same study also cites the Inquirer, with a weekly reach for print of 28% with 13% reaching users at least three days a week; which makes it the most read broadsheet in the country. In terms of online reach, 36% of people in the survey read the online edition with 20% reading the paper at least three days a week, ranking third, next to GMA and ABS-CBN.

At least two opinion pieces cite the Inquirer as the Philippines' newspaper of record but as an opportunity for criticism. The Manila Times criticized it for "publish[ing] ... vapid, unthinking positions", which it called "reprehensible, at best". In 2014, Leloy Claudio in an opinion piece for GMA News noted it as a "de facto paper of record", and added: "This distinguished history only makes it more painful to say that the paper is starting to suck."

== See also ==
- Inquirer Bandera
- Inquirer Compact
- Inquirer Libre
- Isagani Yambot – Publisher of the Philippine Daily Inquirer from 1994 to 2012
- Letty Jimenez Magsanoc – longest-serving and first woman editor-in-chief
- Rina Jimenez-David
- Conrado de Quiros
- Rene Alviar
- Cesar Mangawang
- Lina Sagaral Reyes
