= San Vicente, Palawan =

Municipality in Palawan, Philippines

San Vicente Malagnang
- Municipality
- Municipality of San Vicente
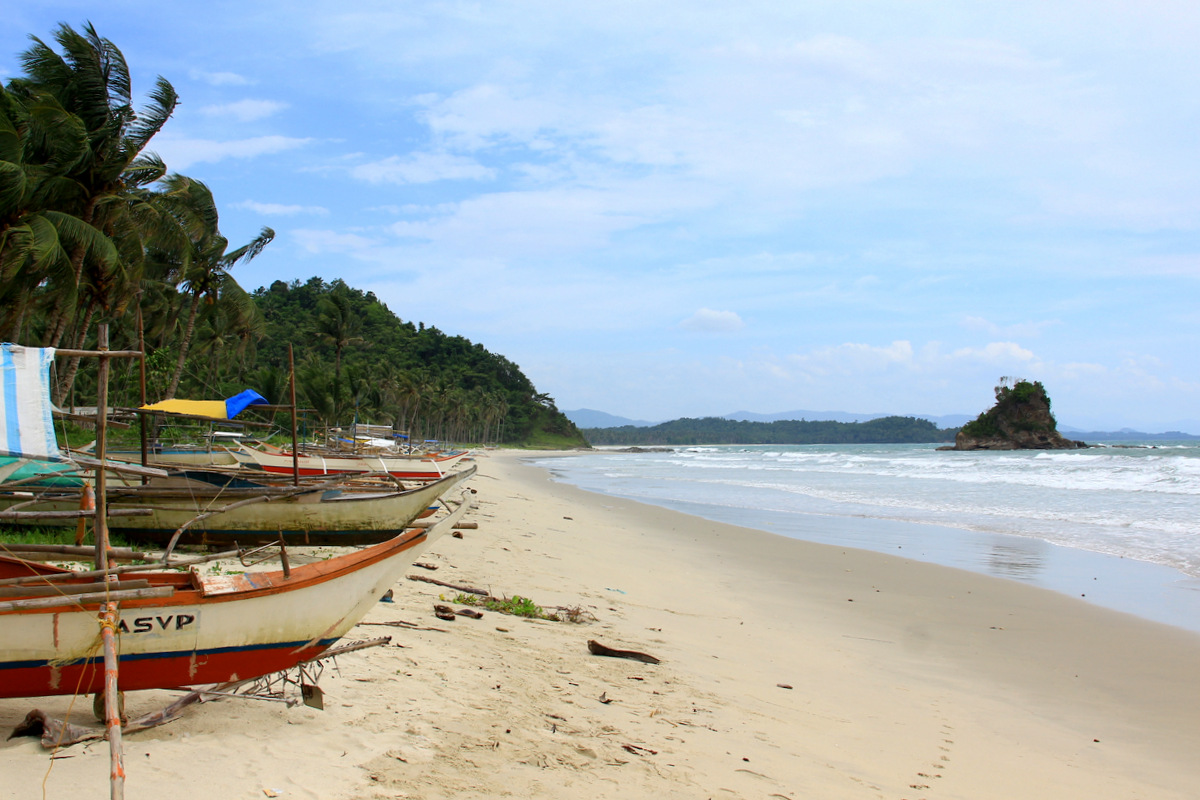
- Alimanguan Beach

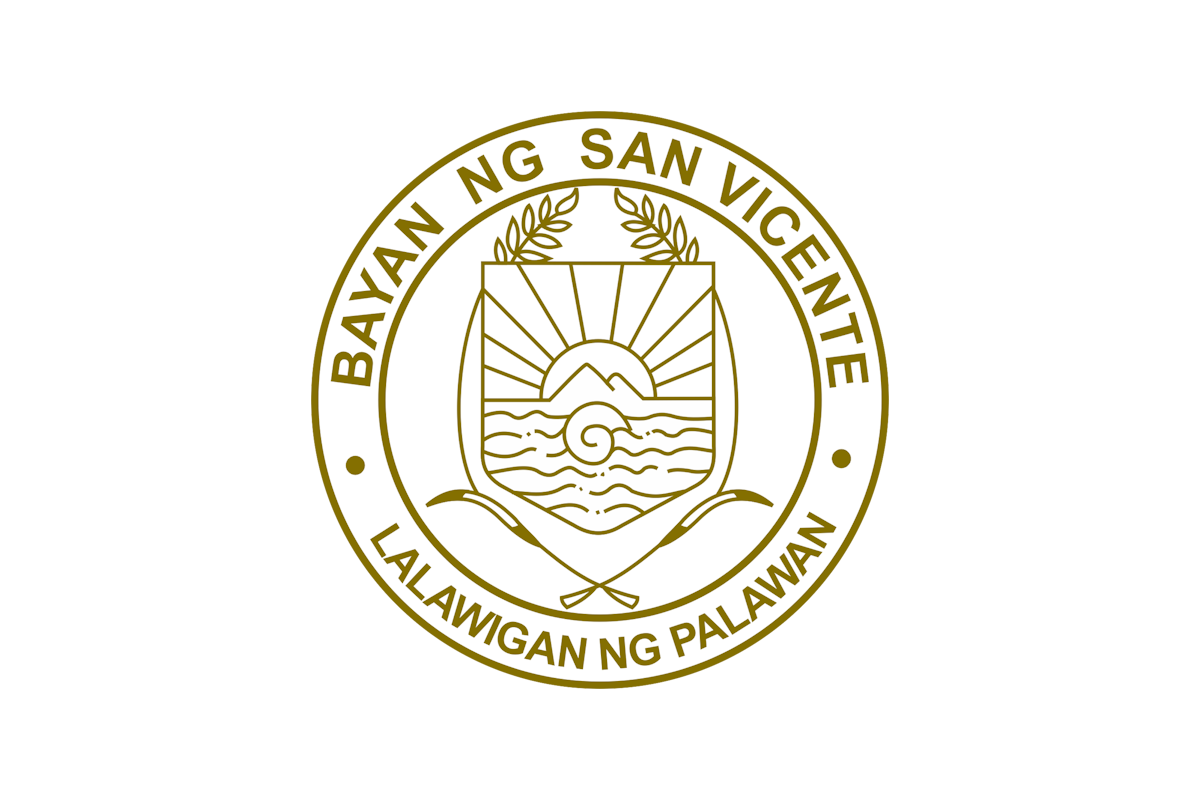
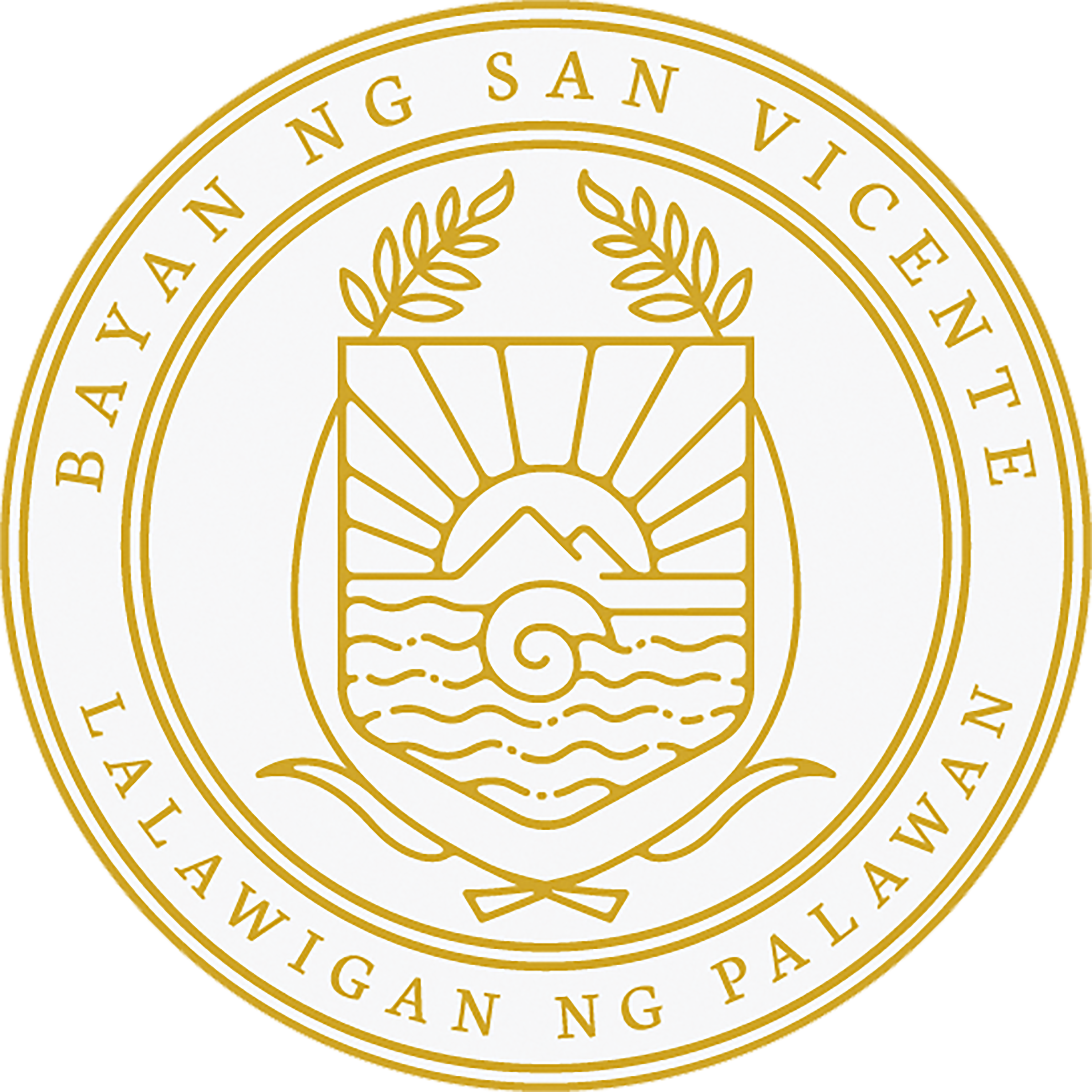
- Flag Seal
- Nicknames: First and Premier Flagship Tourism Enterprise Zone
- Motto: Ang Tao Una sa Lahat, Ang Bayan Higit sa Lahat, Kaunlaran para sa Lahat
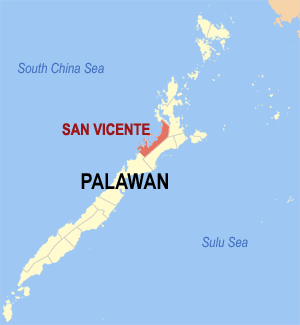
- Map of Palawan with San Vicente highlighted
- Interactive map of San Vicente
- Location within the Philippines
- Coordinates: 10°31′41″N 119°15′15″E
- Country: Philippines
- Region: Mimaropa
- Province: Palawan
- District: 1st district
- Founded: January 2, 1972
- Named for: St. Vincent Ferrer
- Barangays: 10 (see Barangays)

Government
  - Type: Sangguniang Bayan
  - Mayor: Ramir R. Pablico
  - Vice Mayor: Maria Carmen L. Silagan
  - Representative: Rosalie Salvame
  - Municipal Council: Members: Maria Carmem L. Silagan; Melvin C. Ballesteros; Philip Jenrie S. Acosta; Evangeline G. Maagad; Cesar M. Caballero, Sr.; Honorio M. Alejano; Ronnie N. Hikilan, Sr.; Teodulo A. Varquez
  - Electorate: 24,280 voters (2025)

Area
  - Total: 1,462.94 km^{2} (564.84 sq mi)
- Elevation: 12 m (39 ft)
- Highest elevation: 480 m (1,570 ft)
- Lowest elevation: −1 m (−3.3 ft)

Population (2024 census)
  - Total: 33,768
  - Density: 23.082/km^{2} (59.783/sq mi)
  - Households: 8,388

Economy
  - Income class: 1st municipal income class
  - Poverty incidence: 28.13% (2023)
  - Revenue: ₱ 551.4 million (2024)
  - Assets: ₱ 1,426 million (2024)
  - Expenditure: ₱ 468.6 million (2024)

Service provider
  - Electricity: Palawan Electric Cooperative (PALECO)
- Time zone: UTC+8 (PST)
- ZIP code: 5309
- PSGC: 1705319000
- IDD : area code: +63 (0)48
- Native languages: Palawano; Central Tagbanwa; Ibatag; Tagalog
- Website: sanvicentepalawan.gov.ph

San Vicente, officially the Municipality of San Vicente (Tagalog: Bayan ng San Vicente), is a municipality in the province of Palawan, Philippines. According to the 2024 census, it has a population of 33,768 people.

It is home to Long Beach, the longest white sand beach in the Philippines, stretching approximately 14.7 kilometers, nearly three times the length of Boracay’s White Beach.

== History ==
In 1952, migrants from Manamoc, an island of the Cuyo Archipelago, arrived in a place called Malagnang ( muddy/ maputik) a sitio of Kemdeng, formerly part of Puerto Princesa. The first to arrive were the Dandal brothers Anastacio and Lauro Dandal.

Alberto Radam, and Marcelino Gadiano with their families. After sometime their relatives followed forming a small community which gave rise to the election of Anastascio Dandal as the first Barrio Lieutenant.

As the Agutaynon and Cuyunon populations grew, disagreements arose, particularly over the choice of the town’s patron saint. The Cuyunon favored Saint Vincent Ferrer, while the Agutaynon preferred Saint Isidro Labrador. To settle the dispute, the groups agreed to draw lots. The name of Saint Vincent Ferrer was chosen, leading to the renaming of Malagnang to San Vicente.

The Municipality of San Vicente was created on June 21, 1969 separate from Puerto Princesa and Taytay, by virtue of Republic Act 5821. It officially functioned as distinct municipality on January 1, 1972.

The present municipality was formed from several barrios previously under the municipalities of Taytay and Puerto Princesa (now a highly urbanized city). The barrios from New Agutaya to the northernmost barrio of Binga were formerly part of Taytay, while those from San Vicente (Poblacion) to the southernmost barrio of Caruray belonged to Puerto Princesa. San Vicente itself was originally a sitio known as Malagnang before it was elevated to barrio status and renamed through legislation in 1959.

== Geography ==
San Vicente is nestled in the north-west of Palawan's mainland, bounded by the Philippine West Sea in the West, the municipality of Taytay in the north, Roxas in the East and City of Puerto Princesa in the Southwest. With a forest area of 82,080.09 hectares and 22 identified islands and islets within its municipal boundaries. San Vicente is located in the north-western side of the main island of Palawan and is 186 kilometres (116 mi) from Puerto Princesa. It occupies a total land area of 146,294 hectares (361,500 acres).

San Vicente's 14.7 kilometres (9.1 mi) of beachfront, popularly called the Long Beach, is being converted into an emerging tourist destination that will be the beneficiary of government spending on infrastructure. The Long Beach have two rocky cliffs that temporarily interrupts the continuous expanse of approximately 14.7 kilometers of sugary white sand beach dividing it into three coves. However, during low tide, you can walk through the sands at the bottom of the said rocky cliffs. Hence, the local government claims that it is actually continuous. It is the longest white sand beach in the Philippines and is the First Flagship Tourism Enterprise Zone of the Tourism Infrastructure and Enterprise Zone Authority (TIEZA). The Long Beach spans to the coastline of four barangays namely Poblacion, New Agutaya, San Isidro and Alimanguan.

=== Barangays ===
San Vicente is politically subdivided into 11 barangays, as of 2025. Each barangay consists of puroks and some have sitios.

- Alimanguan
- Binga
- Caruray
- New Villa Fria (Kemdeng)
- New Agutaya
- New Canipo
- Port Barton
- Poblacion (San Vicente)
- San Isidro
- Santo Niño
- Santo Onin

=== Climate ===
Climate data for San Vicente, Palawan
Month	Jan	Feb	Mar	Apr	May	Jun	Jul	Aug	Sep	Oct	Nov	Dec	Year
Mean daily maximum °C (°F)	29 (84)	30 (86)	30 (86)	31 (88)	30 (86)	30 (86)	29 (84)	29 (84)	29 (84)	29 (84)	29 (84)	29 (84)	30 (85)
Mean daily minimum °C (°F)	23 (73)	22 (72)	23 (73)	24 (75)	25 (77)	25 (77)	25 (77)	25 (77)	25 (77)	25 (77)	24 (75)	23 (73)	24 (75)
Average precipitation mm (inches)	56 (2.2)	38 (1.5)	68 (2.7)	71 (2.8)	157 (6.2)	208 (8.2)	212 (8.3)	194 (7.6)	216 (8.5)	218 (8.6)	189 (7.4)	107 (4.2)	1,734 (68.2)
Average rainy days	12.9	10.5	14.3	15.9	24.6	27.6	28.6	27.4	27.8	27.5	23.5	18.6	259.2
Source: Meteoblue

As with the general climate of the Philippine Archipelago, San Vicente's dry season begins in December, lasting until the month of May while the onset of the wet or rainy season is in June, usually drying up again in November. Northestern winds, the amihan prevail from November to May. Rough coastal waters characterize the season of habagat, or the south-western winds.

== Demographics ==
Population census of San Vicente

Year	Pop.	±% p.a.
1970	5,388	—
1975	7,420	+6.63%
1980	10,097	+6.35%
1990	17,795	+5.83%
1995	19,449	+1.68%
2000	21,654	+2.33%

Year	Pop.	±% p.a.
2007	25,218	+2.12%
2010	30,919	+7.70%
2015	31,232	+0.19%
2020	33,507	+1.49%
2024	33,768	+0.19%

Source: Philippine Statistics Authority

In the 2024 census, the population of San Vicente was 33,768 people, with a density of 23 inhabitants per square kilometre or 60 inhabitants per square mile.

In the 2010 NSO Census, San Vicente had a total population of 30,919 at a growth rate of 6%. Population increased by 3,500 from 27,065 in 2008 based on CBMS survey within a 2-year gap. The total number of households was 6,460 with average household size of 5 members.

== Economy ==
Poverty incidence of San Vicente (%)

Source: Philippine Statistics Authority

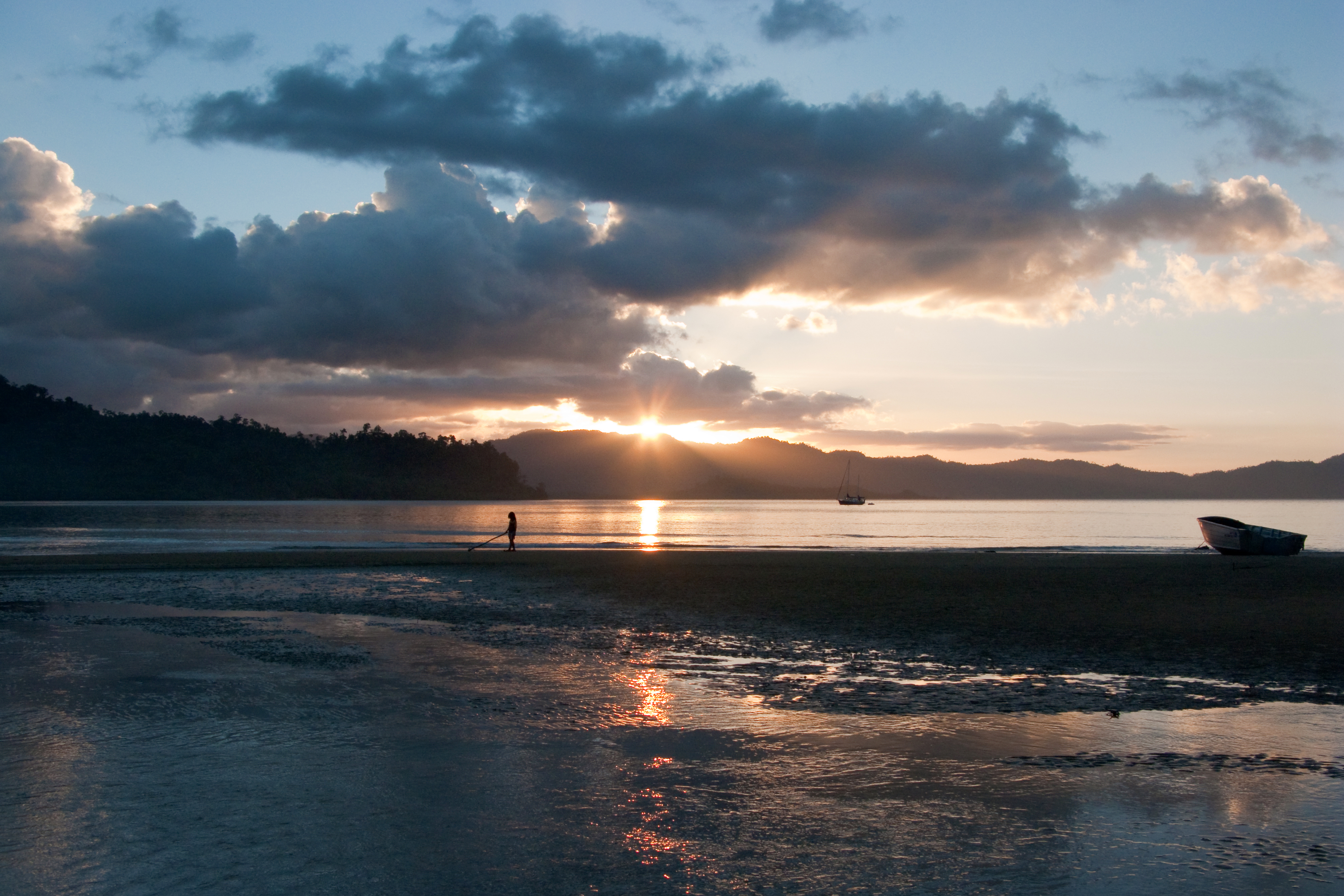
Sunset in Port Barton

Fishing and farming are the major economic activities in San Vicente wherein 29.50% and 25.77% respectively are engaged in it. Rice and coconut are the major agricultural crops and fish products are adequate in the municipality.

San Vicente is predominantly fishing and a farming municipality and now gaining recognition as a center of interest for Tourism. San Vicente can offer a diverse range of attractions for adventure and nature enthusiasts. Roads and other infrastructure support facilities are now on its implementation process through the help of the National Government.

As San Vicente Palawan slowly emerges to become one of the tourism hot spot in the Philippines, the real industry sector becomes dramatically stronger. Many land owners who have more than tens of thousand hectare properties have earned millions of pesos on selling their lots to investors. Beach front properties sell like pancakes in the real estate market.

Many millionaires have ventured into land banking in San Vicente Palawan with its robust potential, earning exponentially from re-selling their acquired properties. Historically, rice field properties were sold at ₱300,000 (equivalent to ₱363,500 in 2021) per hectare in 2014. Three years later, an hectare big usually costs ₱3,000,000 (equivalent to ₱3,465,471 in 2021), with another increase after the San Vicente Airport started servicing small commercial planes.

=== Flagship Tourism Enterprise Zone (Flagship TEZ) ===
The introduction of the San Vicente Flagship TEZ was initiated with the marking of a Memorandum of Agreement (MOA) between the TIEZA and the nearby government unit (LGU) of San Vicente in 2013 – a fearless advance of the neighborhood organization to uphold association and set the course into tourism improvement.

To meet the vision proclamation as the Flagship TEZ and to be a model goal, a Tourism Master Plan was defined to coordinate, control and accomplish adjusted formative pushes and methodologies of the LGU towards an independent, socially capable and naturally stable group. The Tourism Master Plan expects to advance and encourage feasible and reasonable improvement in the region.

In light of the Integrated Tourism Master Plan for the Long Beach range, the Flagship TEZ should be zoned by its attributes and into topics to create tourism items, for example, however not restricted to sun and shoreline, relaxation and stimulation, recreational and sports tourism, eco-tourism and agri-tourism.

San Vicente Palawan Master Plan contains significant information about San Vicente, tourism projections based on other famous tourist destinations, proposed developments and proposed restrictions. The Master Plan also identifies key areas and divided San Vicente Palawan into 4 clusters, based on development and tourism potentials.

== Culture ==
The diversity of San Vicente derives from its 24 ethno-linguistic resident groups, each with their own distinct dialects, and culture heritage. Filipino (Tagalog), however, remains the dominant lingua franca these diverse people that comprise San Vicente populace. In homage to its patron saint, San Vicente Ferrer, the municipality celebrates its town fiesta from April 1–5, Foundation Day on June 21 and Malagnang Festival on June 17–21 of every year.

== Infrastructure ==
=== Aviation ===
The municipality as well as the northern municipalities of Palawan is served by the San Vicente Airport.

=== Energy ===
There are five barangays which are partly served by electricity. The present source of electricity are a 1 unit 500 KW, 1 unit 250 KW and 1 unit 160 KW generating sets operated by National Power Corporation (NAPOCOR) which is sold to consumers through Palawan Electric Cooperative (PALECO). Serving 24 hours since December 2014.

=== Water supply ===
The town has a water system which comes from the surface water of Little Baguio Falls.

=== Communication ===
There are two telecommunication companies, SMART and GLOBE which have installed cell site facilities in Sitio Pinagmangalucan in Barangay Poblacion, Barangay Alimanguan, Barangay Binga, Barangay Port Barton and Barangay Caruray. These modern facilities have made communication much easier, faster and convenient. Likewise cable and internet connection is already available in Barangays Poblacion, Alimanguan and Port Barton.

=== Environment ===
Endowed with white sand beaches, coral reefs, islands and islets, waterfalls, vast forest cover, mangroves, and varied endemic flora, San Vicente serves as habitat for 23 of the 25 wildlife species found in the island of Palawan.

== Education ==
The San Vicente Schools District Office governs all educational institutions within the municipality. It oversees the management and operations of all private and public, from primary to secondary schools.

=== Primary and elementary school ===
- Albaguen Elementary School
- Alimanguan Elementary School
- Barongbong Elementary School
- Baybay Daraga Elementary School
- Binga Elementary School
- Buayan Elementary School
- Bunuangin Elementary School
- Casoyan Elementary School
- Catalat Elementary School
- Cauban Elementary School
- Decala Elementary School
- Faith Baptist Academy
- Irawan Elementary School
- Kemdeng Elementary School
- Macatumbalen Elementary School
- New Agutaya Elementary School
- New Canipo Elementary School
- New Caruray Elementary School
- Old Caruray Elementary School
- Pagdanan Elementary School
- Pamuayan Elementary School
- Panindigan Elementary School
- Port Barton Elementary School
- San Vicente Central School
- Santa Cruz Elementary School
- Santo Niño Elementary School
- T.D.C. Elementary School
- Tranquilino L. Oblan Elementary School

=== Secondary schools ===
- Alimanguan National High School
- Caruray National High School
- New Canipo National High School
- Port Barton National High School
- San Vicente National High School

== Gallery ==
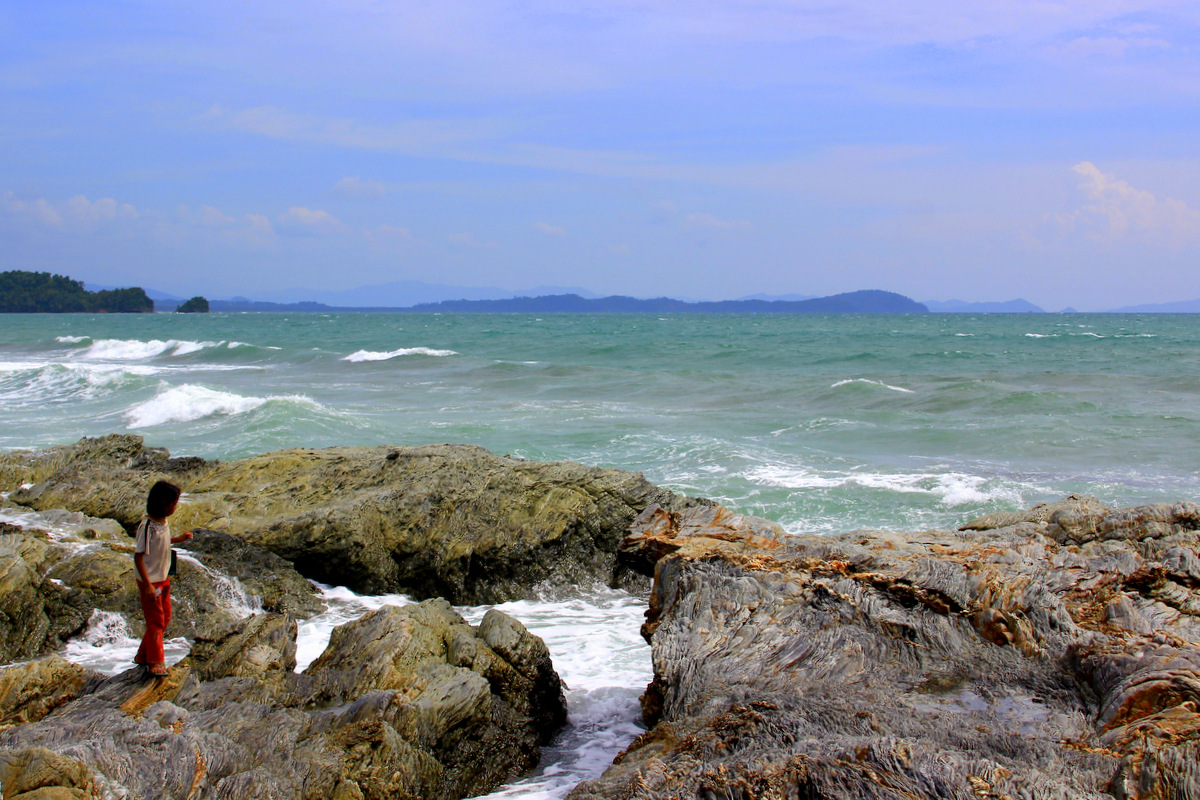
Imuruan Bay

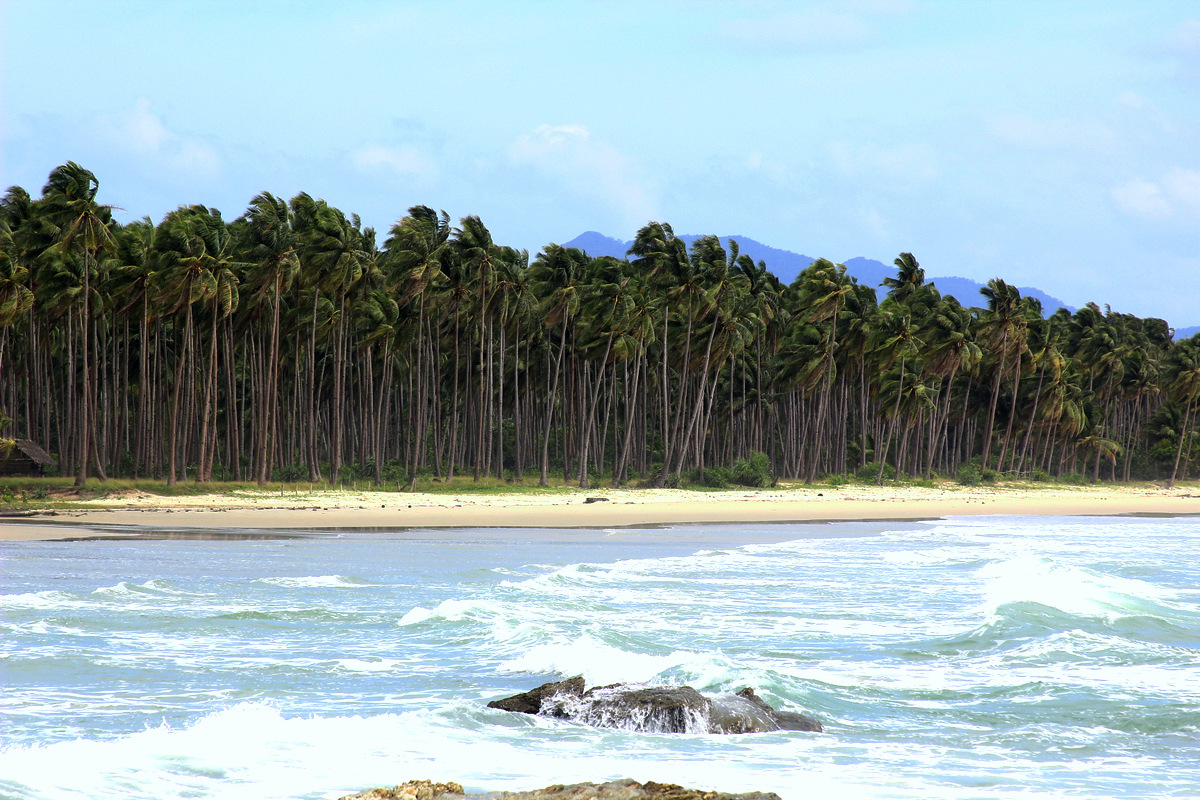
Long Beach

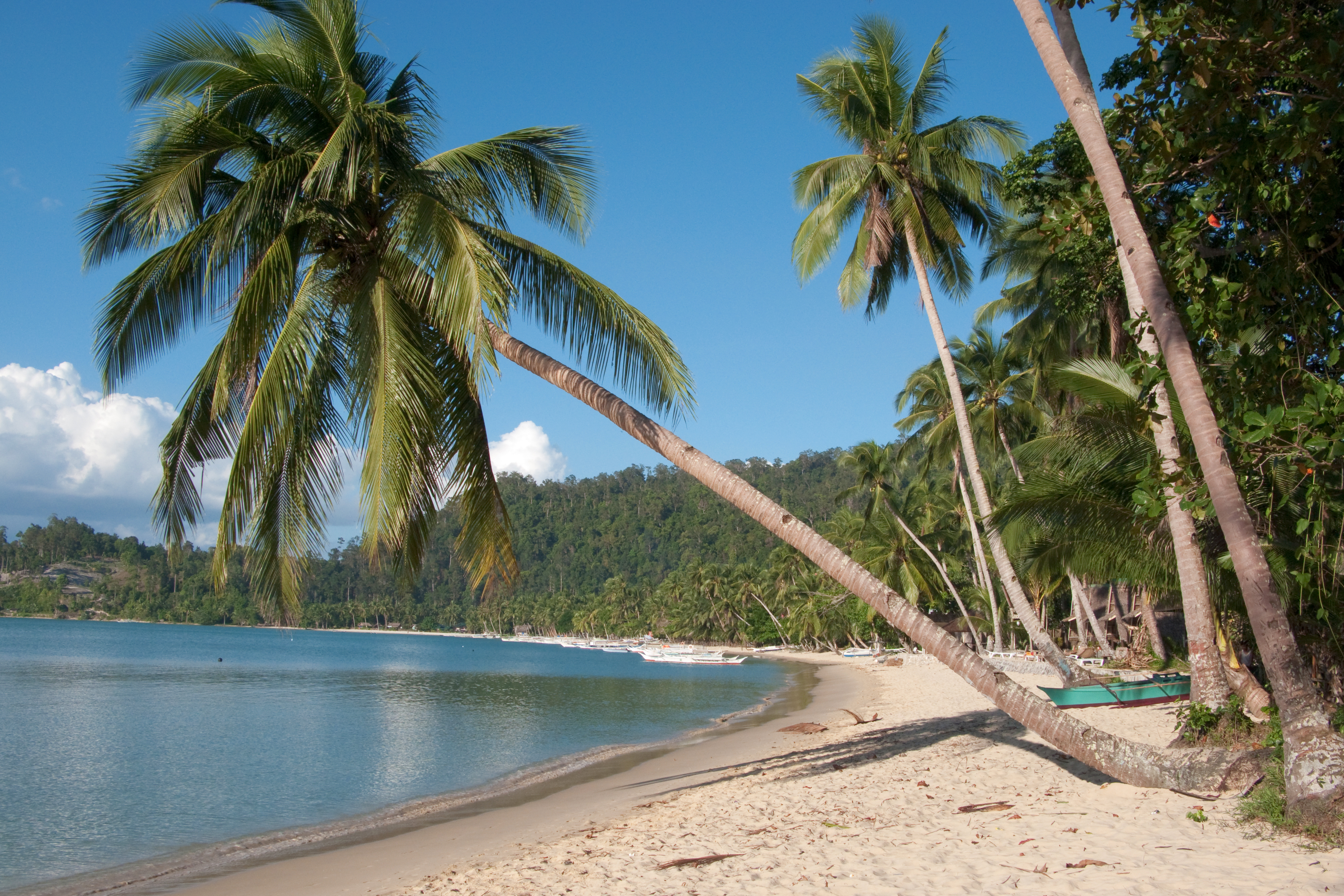
Port Barton Beach

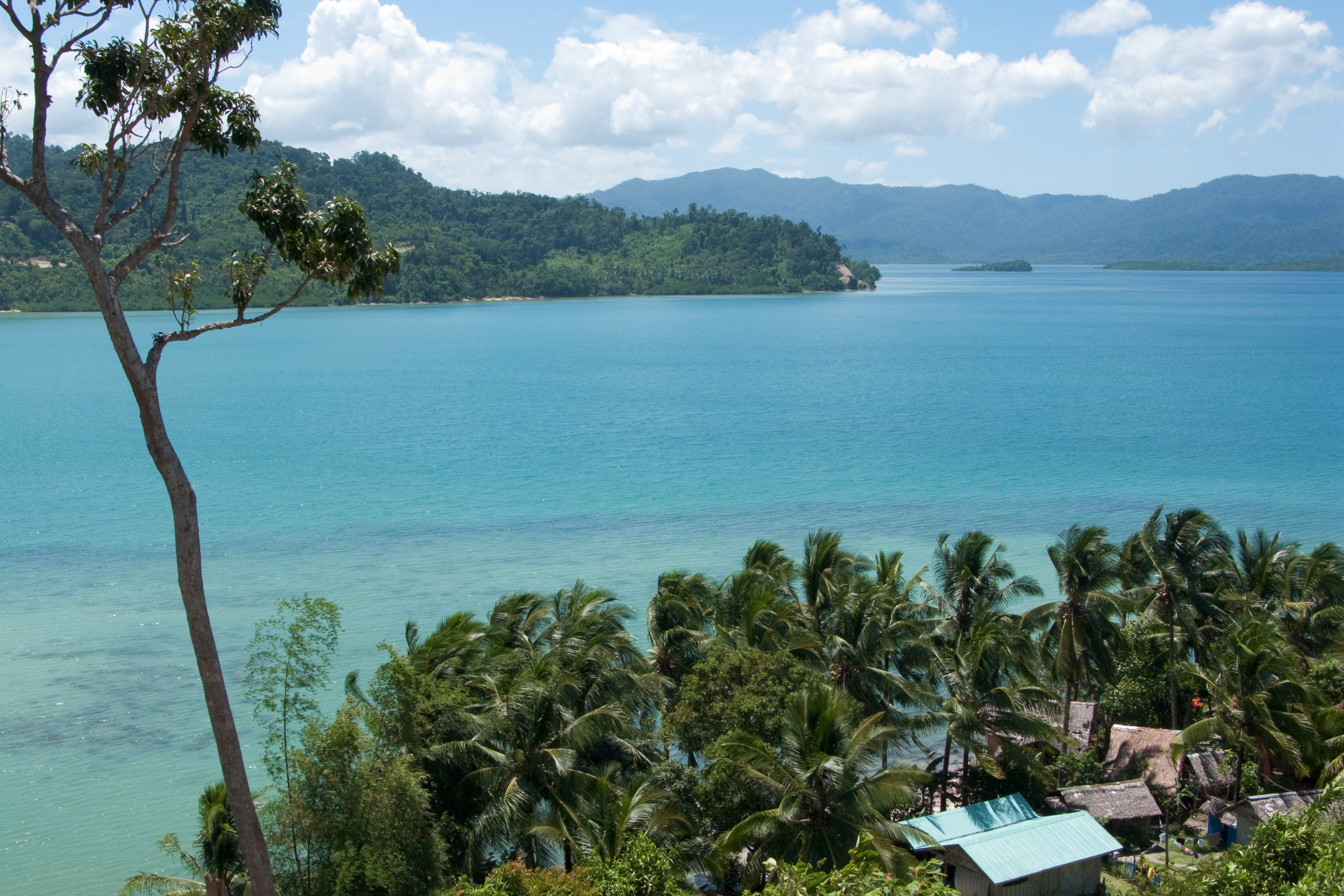
Port Barton Bay

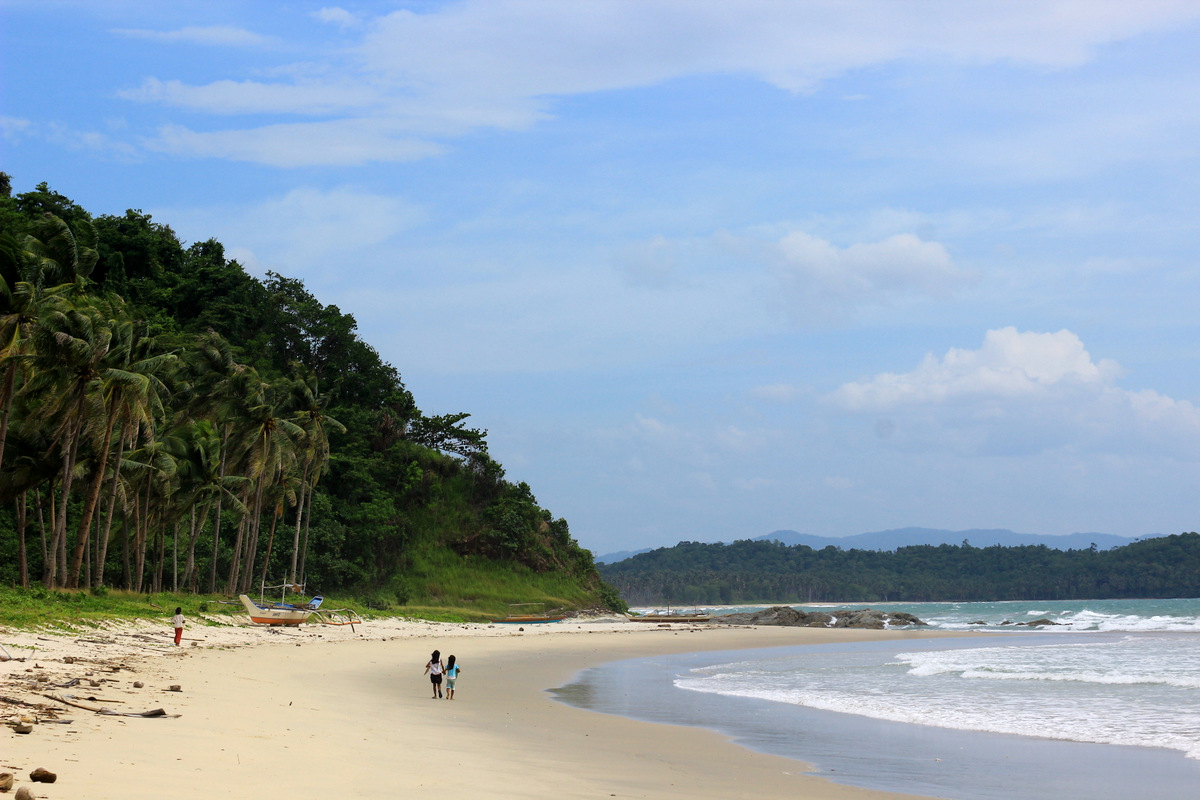
Bokbok Beach

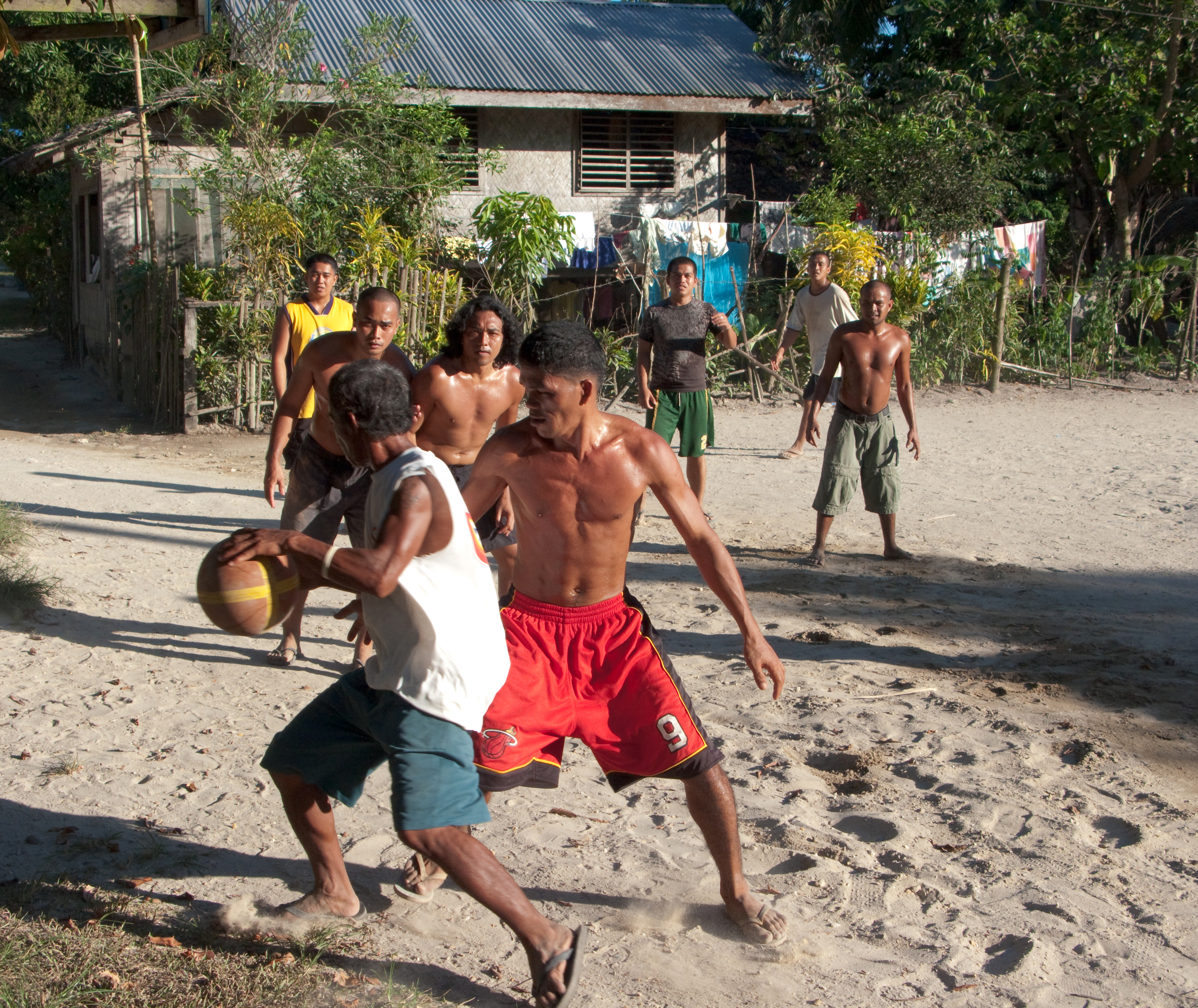
Streetball in Port Barton

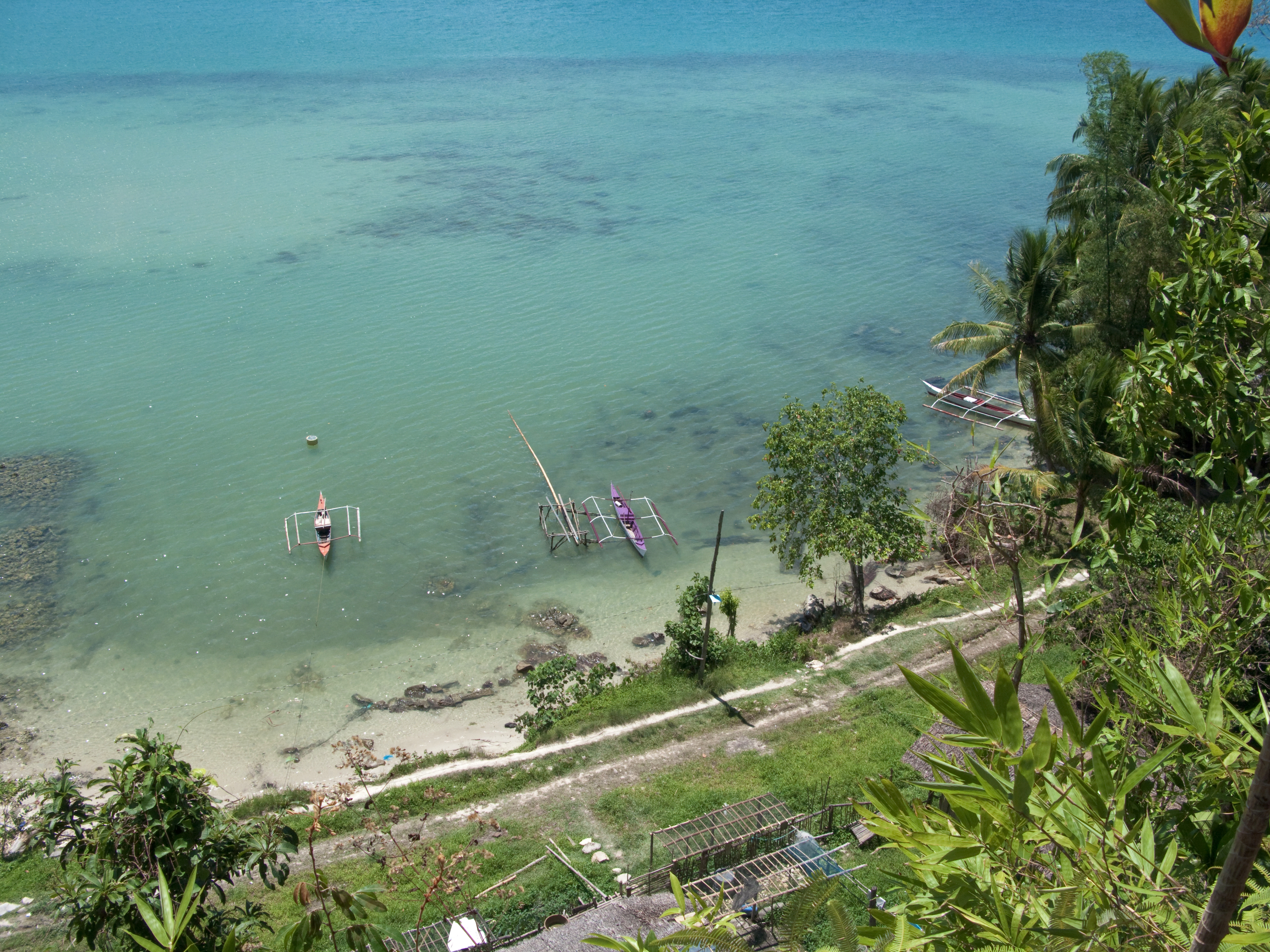
The coastline

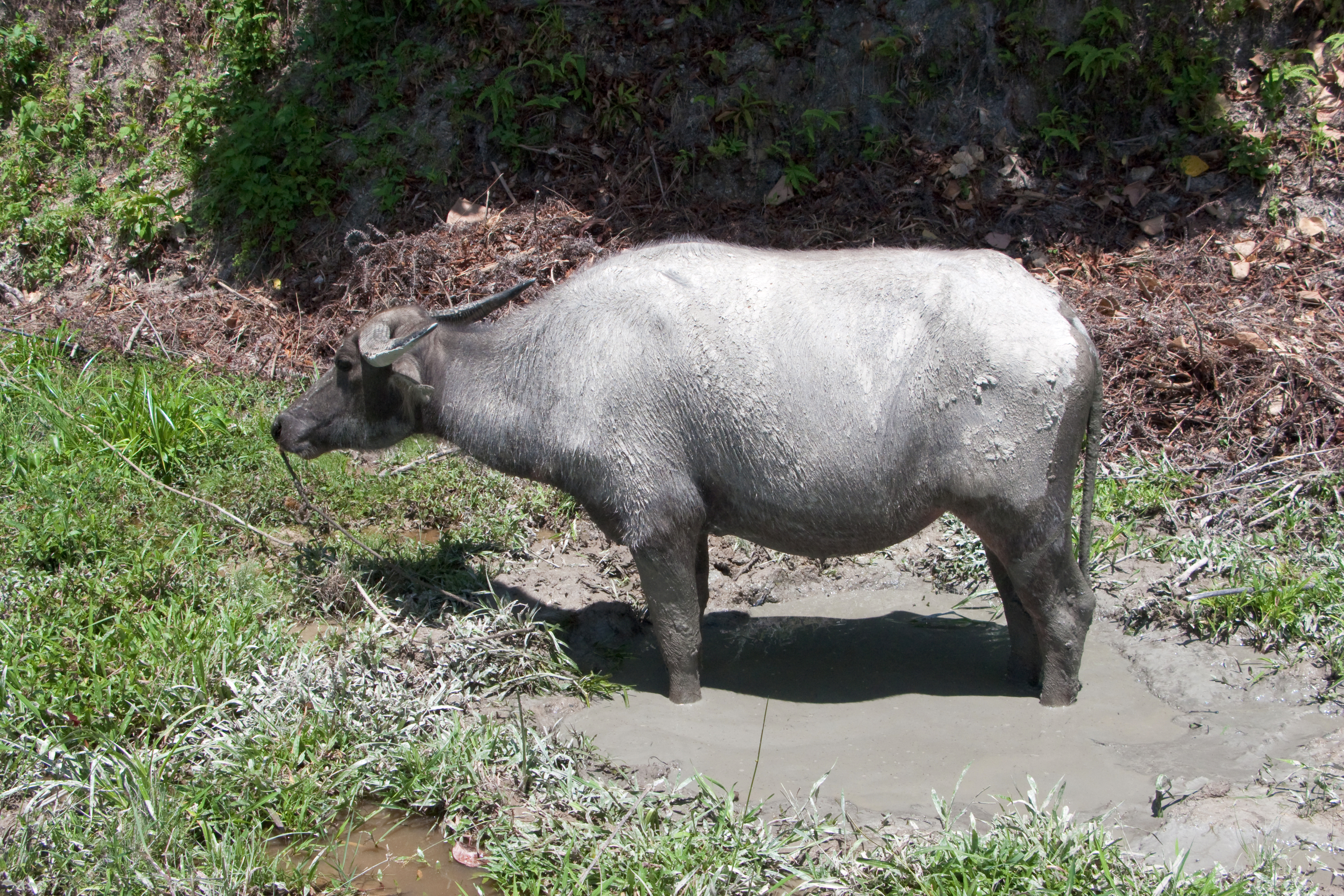
Carabao
