= List of MBC Media Group stations =

This is the list of radio and television stations owned and operated by MBC Media Group.

== MBC Radio ==
Note: All stations are licensed to MBC Media Group or its affiliate broadcast licensees (Philippine Broadcasting Corporation, Cebu Broadcasting Company and Pacific Broadcasting System)

=== DZRH ===
DZRH is MBC's flagship AM radio network. All provincial stations serve as relay stations of DZRH.

Callsign	Frequency	Location	Licensee
DZRH	666 kHz	Metro Manila	MBC Media Group
DWSP	612 kHz	Baguio	Philippine Broadcasting Corporation
DZMT	990 kHz	Laoag	Pacific Broadcasting System
DWDH	1440 kHz	Dagupan	MBC Media Group
DZSR	576 kHz	Tuguegarao	Cebu Broadcasting Company
DWRH	648 kHz	Santiago, Isabela	Pacific Broadcasting System
DWSR	1224 kHz	Lucena	MBC Media Group
DWMT	981 kHz	Naga	Philippine Broadcasting Corporation
DZZH	1287 kHz	Sorsogon City	MBC Media Group
DYPH	693 kHz	Puerto Princesa	MBC Media Group
DYXR	1395 kHz	Cebu City	Cebu Broadcasting Company
DYDH	1485 kHz	Iloilo City	Pacific Broadcasting System
DYBH	1080 kHz	Bacolod	Pacific Broadcasting System
DYTH	990 kHz	Palo, Leyte	Pacific Broadcasting System
DXRF	1260 kHz	Davao City	MBC Media Group
DXGH	531 kHz	General Santos	Pacific Broadcasting System
DXCH	567 kHz	Cotabato City	Pacific Broadcasting System
DXKH	972 kHz	Cagayan de Oro	Cebu Broadcasting Company
DXZH	855 kHz	Zamboanga City	Cebu Broadcasting Company

=== Love Radio ===
Love Radio is MBC's flagship FM radio network.

Branding	Callsign	Frequency	Location	Licensee
Love Radio Manila	DZMB	90.7 MHz	Mega Manila	Cebu Broadcasting Company
Love Radio Laoag	DWIL	90.7 MHz	Laoag	MBC Media Group
Love Radio Santiago	DWIP	94.5 MHz	Santiago, Isabela	MBC Media Group
Love Radio Tuguegarao	DWMN	94.1 MHz	Tuguegarao	MBC Media Group
Love Radio Baguio	DWMB	95.1 MHz	Baguio	MBC Media Group
Love Radio Dagupan	DWID	98.3 MHz	Dagupan	MBC Media Group
Love Radio La Union	DWST	101.7 MHz	San Fernando, La Union	Pacific Broadcasting System
Love Radio Tarlac	DZLT	97.7 MHz	Tarlac City	MBC Media Group
Love Radio Lucena	DWLW	100.7 MHz	Lucena	Pacific Broadcasting System
Love Radio Daet	DWKS	95.3 MHz	Daet	MBC Media Group
Love Radio Naga	DWYN	99.1 MHz	Naga, Camarines Sur	MBC Media Group
Love Radio Legazpi	DWCM	99.5 MHz	Legazpi, Albay	Pacific Broadcasting System
Love Radio Palawan	DYEZ	98.3 MHz	Puerto Princesa	MBC Media Group
Love Radio Cebu	DYBU	97.9 MHz	Cebu City	MBC Media Group
Love Radio Bacolod	DYKS	91.9 MHz	Bacolod	MBC Media Group
Love Radio Iloilo	DYMB	97.5 MHz	Iloilo City	Philippine Broadcasting Corporation
Love Radio Roxas	DYML	105.7 MHz	Roxas City	MBC Media Group
Love Radio Kalibo	DYSM	100.1 MHz	Kalibo	Cebu Broadcasting Company
Love Radio Tacloban	DYTM	91.1 MHz	Tacloban	MBC Media Group
Love Radio Catarman	DYLC	94.1 MHz	Catarman	Cebu Broadcasting Company
Love Radio Davao	DXBM	90.7 MHz	Davao City	MBC Media Group
Love Radio General Santos	DXWK	101.5 MHz	General Santos	MBC Media Group
Love Radio Koronadal	DXME	100.1 MHz	Koronadal	MBC Media Group
Love Radio Malaybalay	DXIQ	106.3 MHz	Malaybalay	MBC Media Group
Love Radio Butuan	DXMB	95.1 MHz	Butuan	MBC Media Group
Love Radio Zamboanga	DXCM	97.9 MHz	Zamboanga City	MBC Media Group

=== Aksyon Radyo ===
Aksyon Radyo
- Type: Broadcast AM radio network, (News, Public Affairs, Talk)
- Country: Philippines
- Availability: Regional

Aksyon Radio is MBC's regional AM radio network.

Branding	Callsign	Frequency	Location	Licensee
Aksyon Radyo Cebu	DYRC	648 kHz	Cebu City	MBC Media Group
Aksyon Radyo Laoag	DZJC	747 kHz	Laoag	MBC Media Group
Aksyon Radyo La Union	DZNL	783 kHz	San Fernando, La Union	Philippine Broadcasting Corporation
Aksyon Radyo Pangasinan	DWCM	1161 kHz	Dagupan	Philippine Broadcasting Corporation
Aksyon Radyo Iloilo	DYOK	720 kHz	Iloilo City	MBC Media Group
Aksyon Radyo Bacolod	DYEZ	684 kHz	Bacolod	MBC Media Group
Aksyon Radyo Catarman	DYSM	972 kHz	Catarman, Northern Samar	Cebu Broadcasting Company
Aksyon Radyo Catbalogan	DYMS	1044 kHz	Catbalogan	Cebu Broadcasting Company
Aksyon Radyo Tacloban	DYVL	819 kHz	Tacloban	MBC Media Group
Aksyon Radyo Davao	DXGO	855 kHz	Davao City	Pacific Broadcasting System

=== Yes FM ===
Yes FM
- Type: Broadcast FM radio network, (Contemporary MOR, OPM)
- Country: Philippines
- Availability: Nationwide
- Founded: 1998
- Motto: Solid!
- Former names: Yes The Best! (2016–2024)

Yes FM is MBC's second FM radio network.

Branding	Callsign	Frequency	Location	Licensee
Yes FM Manila	DWYS	101.1 MHz	Mega Manila	Pacific Broadcasting System
Yes FM Cauayan	DWYE	89.7 MHz	Cauayan, Isabela	Cebu Broadcasting Company
Yes FM Dagupan	DWHR	106.3 MHz	Dagupan	Pacific Broadcasting System
Yes FM Urdaneta	DZVM	104.1 MHz	Urdaneta, Pangasinan	MBC Media Group
Yes FM Boracay	DYYR	91.1 MHz	Boracay	MBC Media Group
Yes FM Cebu	DYHR	91.5 MHz	Cebu City	Cebu Broadcasting Company
Yes FM Dumaguete	DYYD	106.3 MHz	Dumaguete	Cebu Broadcasting Company
Yes FM Valencia	DXAT	104.1 MHz	Valencia, Bukidnon	Cebu Broadcasting Company
Yes FM Cagayan de Oro	DXYR	104.7 MHz	Cagayan de Oro	Philippine Broadcasting Corporation
Yes FM Iligan	DXFE	99.3 MHz	Iligan	Pacific Broadcasting System
Yes FM Zamboanga	DXHT	102.7 MHz	Zamboanga City	Cebu Broadcasting Company

=== Easy Rock ===
Easy Rock carries a Soft AC format.

Branding	Callsign	Frequency	Location	Licensee
Easy Rock Manila	DWRK	96.3 MHz	Mega Manila	MBC Media Group
Easy Rock Baguio	DZYS	91.9 MHz	Baguio	Cebu Broadcasting Company
Easy Rock Cebu	DYES	102.7 MHz	Cebu City	Pacific Broadcasting System
Easy Rock Bacolod	DYMY	105.5 MHz	Bacolod	Cebu Broadcasting Company
Easy Rock Iloilo	DYYS	92.3 MHz	Iloilo City	MBC Media Group
Easy Rock Boracay	DYEY	93.5 MHz	Boracay	Cebu Broadcasting Company
Easy Rock Davao	DXYS	105.1 MHz	Davao City	Cebu Broadcasting Company
Easy Rock Cagayan de Oro	DXKS	96.9 MHz	Cagayan de Oro	MBC Media Group

=== Radyo Natin ===
Radyo Natin is MBC's community radio network with more than 100 stations across the country.

Luzon

Branding	Callsign	Frequency	Location	Licensee
Radyo Natin Nationwide	DWRK	96.3 MHz (HD2)	Metro Manila	MBC Media Group
Radyo Natin Abra	DWGF	95.3 MHz	Bangued	MBC Media Group
Radyo Natin Bontoc	DZVL	100.9 MHz	Bontoc, Mountain Province	MBC Media Group
Radyo Natin Buguias	DZVD	100.7 MHz	Buguias	MBC Media Group
Radyo Natin Banaue	DZVK	101.7 MHz	Banaue	MBC Media Group
Radyo Natin Tabuk	DWMC	103.7 MHz	Tabuk	MBC Media Group
Radyo Natin Candon	DWRE	104.5 MHz	Candon	MBC Media Group
Radyo Natin Agoo	DWIS	106.7 MHz	Agoo	MBC Media Group
Radyo Natin Alaminos	DWSF	100.1 MHz	Alaminos, Pangasinan	MBC Media Group
Radyo Natin Aparri	DWWW	102.1 MHz	Aparri	MBC Media Group
Radyo Natin Claveria	DWIZ	94.5 MHz	Claveria, Cagayan	MBC Media Group
Radyo Natin Basco	DWWF	103.7 MHz	Basco, Batanes	MBC Media Group
Radyo Natin Bayombong	DWGL	104.5 MHz	Bayombong	Philippine Broadcasting Corporation
Radyo Natin Santiago	DWTR	93.7 MHz	Santiago, Isabela	Philippine Broadcasting Corporation
Radyo Natin Maddela	DZVJ	101.7 MHz	Maddela	MBC Media Group
Radyo Natin Baler	DWLN	88.5 MHz	Baler, Aurora	MBC Media Group
Radyo Natin Iba	DWRQ	105.7 MHz	Iba, Zambales	MBC Media Group
Radyo Natin San Jose, Nueva Ecija	DWSY	103.3 MHz	San Jose, Nueva Ecija	MBC Media Group
Radyo Natin Guimba	DWTC	105.3 MHz	Guimba	MBC Media Group
Radyo Natin Laguna	DZVA	106.3 MHz	Calamba, Laguna	MBC Media Group
Radyo Natin Padre Garcia	DZVI	105.5 MHz	Padre Garcia	MBC Media Group
Radyo Natin Lemery	DWLC	102.3 MHz	Lemery, Batangas	MBC Media Group
Radyo Natin Atimonan	DWML	106.5 MHz	Atimonan	MBC Media Group
Radyo Natin Calauag	DWRL	100.9 MHz	Calauag	MBC Media Group
Radyo Natin BonPen	DZVB	102.5 MHz	Catanauan	MBC Media Group
Radyo Natin Gumaca	DWGR	107.9 MHz	Gumaca	MBC Media Group
Radyo Natin Infanta	DWRI	105.3 MHz	Infanta, Quezon	MBC Media Group
Radyo Natin Lucban	DWRH	104.5 MHz	Lucban	MBC Media Group
Radyo Natin Sablayan	DWME	103.3 MHz	Sablayan	MBC Media Group
Radyo Natin San Jose, Occ. Mindoro	DWRM	101.7 MHz	San Jose, Occidental Mindoro	MBC Media Group
Radyo Natin Calapan	DWCA	96.9 MHz	Calapan	MBC Media Group
Radyo Natin Bongabong	DWMH	103.7 MHz	Bongabong	MBC Media Group
Radyo Natin Victoria	DWMJ	102.9 MHz	Victoria, Oriental Mindoro	MBC Media Group
Radyo Natin Pinamalayan	DWMK	105.3 MHz	Pinamalayan	MBC Media Group
Radyo Natin Roxas, Oriental Mindoro	DWOX	98.9 MHz	Roxas, Oriental Mindoro	MBC Media Group
Radyo Natin Boac	DZVH	105.7 MHz	Boac, Marinduque	MBC Media Group
Radyo Natin Sta. Cruz, Marinduque	DWMD	104.5 MHz	Santa Cruz, Marinduque	MBC Media Group
Radyo Natin Odiongan	DZVG	101.3 MHz	Odiongan	MBC Media Group
Radyo Natin Looc	DWMM	104.5 MHz	Looc, Romblon	MBC Media Group
Radyo Natin Brooke's Point, Palawan	DWMI	104.5 MHz	Brooke's Point	MBC Media Group
Radyo Natin Coron	DWRZ	100.5 MHz	Coron, Palawan	MBC Media Group
Radyo Natin Roxas, Palawan	DWRO	101.3 MHz	Roxas, Palawan	MBC Media Group
Radyo Natin Paracale	DZVN	101.3 MHz	Paracale	MBC Media Group
Radyo Natin Sta. Elena	DZVC	99.3 MHz	Santa Elena, Camarines Norte	MBC Media Group
Radyo Natin Iriga	DWIR	107.1 MHz	Iriga	MBC Media Group
Radyo Natin Naga	DZTR	89.5 MHz	Naga, Camarines Sur	Cebu Broadcasting Company
Radyo Natin Baao	DWPJ	88.7 MHz	Baao	Philippine Broadcasting Corporation
Radyo Natin Buhi	DZVF	100.1 MHz	Buhi, Camarines Sur	MBC Media Group
Radyo Natin Tabaco	DWTJ	107.7 MHz	Tabaco	MBC Media Group
Radyo Natin Tiwi	DWRU	104.9 MHz	Tiwi, Albay	MBC Media Group
Radyo Natin Irosin	DWRB	104.7 MHz	Irosin	MBC Media Group
Radyo Natin Pilar	DWMP	102.9 MHz	Pilar, Sorsogon	MBC Media Group
Radyo Natin Sorsogon	DWSG	91.9 MHz	Sorsogon City	MBC Media Group
Radyo Natin Virac	DWJS	107.1 MHz	Virac, Catanduanes	MBC Media Group
Radyo Natin Masbate City	DYRQ	107.1 MHz	Masbate City	MBC Media Group

Visayas

Branding	Callsign	Frequency	Location	Operator/Licensee
Radyo Natin Culasi	DYRE	101.1 MHz	Culasi	MBC Media Group
Radyo Natin Bugasong	DYBG	102.9 MHz	Bugasong	MBC Media Group
Radyo Natin San Jose	DYRS	91.7 MHz	San Jose de Buenavista	MBC Media Group
Radyo Natin Hamtic	DYHL	106.9 MHz	Hamtic	MBC Media Group
Radyo Natin Kalibo	DYYM	98.5 MHz	Kalibo	MBC Media Group
Radyo Natin San Carlos	DYRE	103.7 MHz	San Carlos, Negros Occidental	MBC Media Group
Radyo Natin Sipalay	DYDA	95.3 MHz	Sipalay	MBC Media Group
Radyo Natin Victorias	DYRV	93.1 MHz	Victorias	MBC Media Group
Radyo Natin Hinigaran	DYSO	105.7 MHz	Hinigaran	MBC Media Group
Radyo Natin Hinoba-an	DYSL	105.3 MHz	Hinoba-an	MBC Media Group
Radyo Natin Sagay	DYRQ	88.3 MHz	Sagay, Negros Occidental	MBC Media Group
Radyo Natin Kabankalan	DYCB	103.7 MHz	Kabankalan	MBC Media Group
Radyo Natin Bayawan	DYSJ	105.7 MHz	Bayawan	MBC Media Group
Radyo Natin Bais	DYBI	105.5 MHz	Bais, Negros Oriental	MBC Media Group
Radyo Natin Guihulngan	DYSK	92.1 MHz	Guihulngan	MBC Media Group
Radyo Natin Daanbantayan	DYRO	101.3 MHz	Daanbantayan	MBC Media Group
Radyo Natin Madridejos	DYEE	102.9 MHz	Madridejos, Cebu	MBC Media Group
Radyo Natin Pinamungajan	DYRR	103.9 MHz	Pinamungajan	MBC Media Group
Radyo Natin Balamban	DYRL	94.9 MHz	Balamban	MBC Media Group
Radyo Natin Moalboal	DYRH	102.5 MHz	Moalboal	MBC Media Group
Radyo Natin Argao	DYRW	104.5 MHz	Argao	MBC Media Group
Radyo Natin Jagna	DYNJ	98.1 MHz	Jagna	MBC Media Group
Radyo Natin Ubay	DYZT	103.1 MHz	Ubay, Bohol	MBC Media Group
Radyo Natin Naval	DYSF	103.9 MHz	Naval, Biliran	MBC Media Group
Radyo Natin Allen	DYSN	105.7 MHz	Allen, Northern Samar	MBC Media Group
Radyo Natin Laoang	DYRN	90.9 MHz	Laoang	MBC Media Group
Radyo Natin Borongan	DYSD	104.1 MHz	Borongan	MBC Media Group
Radyo Natin Guiuan	DYSG	103.7 MHz	Guiuan	MBC Media Group
Radyo Natin Oras	DYSH	103.9 MHz	Oras, Eastern Samar	MBC Media Group
Radyo Natin Calbayog	DYSI	104.9 MHz	Calbayog	MBC Media Group
Radyo Natin Ormoc	DYXC	107.1 MHz	Ormoc	MBC Media Group
Radyo Natin Baybay	DYSA	102.9 MHz	Baybay	MBC Media Group
Radyo Natin Sogod	DYSC	103.1 MHz	Sogod, Southern Leyte	MBC Media Group

Mindanao

Branding	Callsign	Frequency	Location	Operator/Licensee
Radyo Natin Dipolog	DXBD	100.5 MHz	Dipolog	MBC Media Group
Radyo Natin Sindangan	DXXE	94.5 MHz	Sindangan	MBC Media Group
Radyo Natin Pagadian	DXMD	91.9 MHz	Pagadian	MBC Media Group
Radyo Natin Margosatubig	DXRH	91.3 MHz	Margosatubig	MBC Media Group
Radyo Natin Molave	DXWE	95.7 MHz	Molave, Zamboanga del Sur	MBC Media Group
Radyo Natin Buug	DXXE	105.3 MHz	Buug	MBC Media Group
Radyo Natin Ipil	DXDS	95.3 MHz	Ipil, Zamboanga Sibugay	MBC Media Group
Radyo Natin Cagayan de Oro	DXHY	106.3 MHz	Cagayan de Oro	Cebu Broadcasting Company
Radyo Natin Gingoog	DXRS	105.7 MHz	Gingoog	MBC Media Group
Radyo Natin Oroquieta	DXRQ	106.1 MHz	Oroquieta	MBC Media Group
Radyo Natin Manolo Fortich	DXRA	100.9 MHz	Manolo Fortich	MBC Media Group
Radyo Natin Maramag	DXRO	106.9 MHz	Maramag	MBC Media Group
Radyo Natin Bayugan	DXRW	105.7 MHz	Bayugan	MBC Media Group
Radyo Natin Nabunturan	DXWH	104.7 MHz	Nabunturan	MBC Media Group
Radyo Natin Tagum	DXWG	107.9 MHz	Tagum	Pacific Broadcasting System
Radyo Natin Baganga	DXKE	100.5 MHz	Baganga	MBC Media Group
Radyo Natin Gov. Generoso	DXSB	104.9 MHz	Governor Generoso	MBC Media Group
Radyo Natin Lupon	DXSC	105.3 MHz	Lupon	MBC Media Group
Radyo Natin Manay	DXRE	101.3 MHz	Manay, Davao Oriental	MBC Media Group
Radyo Natin Mati	DXSI	105.3 MHz	Mati, Davao Oriental	MBC Media Group
Radyo Natin Sto. Tomas	DXRZ	105.3 MHz	Santo Tomas, Davao del Norte	MBC Media Group
Radyo Natin Malita	DXSA	105.5 MHz	Malita	MBC Media Group
Radyo Natin Kidapawan	DXYY	107.1 MHz	Kidapawan	MBC Media Group
Radyo Natin Kiamba	DXSG	101.3 MHz	Kiamba, Sarangani	MBC Media Group
Radyo Natin Lebak	DXLR	105.1 MHz	Lebak, Sultan Kudarat	MBC Media Group
Radyo Natin Isulan	DXSD	101.3 MHz	Isulan	MBC Media Group
Radyo Natin Maasim	DXSH	101.7 MHz	Maasim	MBC Media Group
Radyo Natin Tacurong	DXRB	94.5 MHz	Tacurong	MBC Media Group
Radyo Natin San Francisco	DXRY	104.9 MHz	San Francisco, Agusan del Sur	MBC Media Group
Radyo Natin Bislig	DXSW	91.1 MHz	Bislig	MBC Media Group
Radyo Natin Bongao	DXFB	90.9 MHz	Bongao	MBC Media Group
Radyo Natin Cotabato	DXTC	95.9 MHz	Cotabato City	MBC Media Group

- Radyo Natin Nationwide simulcast over DWRK 96.3 Easy Rock via Digital Radio subchannel 96.3-HD2 (HD Radio).

=== Other stations ===
Branding	Callsign	Frequency	Location	Licensee
Ben FM	DYBG	91.7 MHz	Medellin	MBC Media Group
DZRH News FM	DXTS	94.3 MHz	General Santos	Cebu Broadcasting Company

== TV stations ==
=== Digital ===
DZRH TV"s upcoming expansion of digital terrestrial television will be announced as soon as possible for other key regional areas nationwide:

Branding	Callsign	Channel	Frequency	Power	Location
DZRHTV Iloilo	DYOK	43	647.143 MHz	1 kW	Iloilo City
DZRHTV Bacolod	DYEZ	39	623.143 MHz	1 kW	Bacolod
DZRHTV Cebu	DYBU	43	647.143 MHz	1 kW	Cebu City

=== Cable ===
Provider	Channel	Coverage
Cignal	18	Nationwide
Satlite	140	Nationwide
G Sat	10	Nationwide
Sky Cable	129	Metro Manila
Cablelink	4	Metro Manila
Converge Vision	26	Metro Manila
Parasat	101	Regional

== Former stations ==
=== Hot FM (defunct) ===
Note: Since 2016, most Hot FM stations had rebranded to Radyo Natin.

Branding	Callsign	Frequency	Power	Location
Hot FM 100.1 Santiago	DWHT	100.1 MHz	5 kW	Santiago, Isabela
Hot FM 92.1 Labo, Camarines Norte	DWBO	92.1 MHz	5 kW	Labo, Camarines Norte
Hot FM 93.1 Laoag	DWNA	93.1 MHz	1 kW	Laoag
Hot FM 97.3 Solsona, Ilocos Norte	DWSO	97.3 MHz	5 kW	Solsona, Ilocos Norte
Hot FM 98.7 Ballesteros, Cagayan	DZBE	98.7 MHz	5 kW	Ballesteros, Cagayan
Hot FM 91.9 Olongapo	DWZO	91.9 MHz	5 kW	Olongapo
Hot FM 92.7 Binan	DWSP	92.7 MHz	1 kW	Biñan
Hot FM 101.5 San Pablo	DWSP	101.5 MHz	0.30 kW	San Pablo, Laguna
Hot FM 91.1 Cavite	DWCV	91.1 MHz	1 kW	Cavite City
Hot FM 103.5 Lopez	DWQP	103.5 MHz	5 kW	Lopez, Quezon
Hot FM 105.5 Tagkawayan, Quezon	DWQT	105.5 MHz	1 kW	Tagkawayan
Hot FM 98.9 Roxas, Oriental Mindoro	DWOX	98.9 MHz	1 kW	Roxas, Oriental Mindoro
Hot FM 94.5 Sipocot, Camarines Sur	DWSU	94.5 MHz	1 kW	Sipocot
Hot FM 103.5 Calabanga, Camarines Sur	DWCG	103.5 MHz	1 kW	Calabanga
Hot FM 103.9 Goa, Camarines Sur	DWGO	103.9 MHz	5 kW	Goa, Camarines Sur
Hot FM 88.3 Baao, Camarines Sur	N/A	88.7 MHz	5 kW	Baao
Hot FM 101.9 Tinambac, Camarines Sur	N/A	101.9 MHz	5 kW	Tinambac
Hot FM 97.9 Polangui	DWJJ	97.9 MHz	2 kW	Polangui
Hot FM 99.1 Casiguran (FM1)	DWCA	99.1 MHz	0.10 kW	Casiguran, Sorsogon
Hot FM 94.9 Masbate City	DZMH	94.9 MHz	5 kW	Masbate City
Hot FM 102.1 Placer	DWRY	102.1 MHz	5 kW	Placer, Masbate
Hot FM 103.3 Aroroy	DYKM	103.3 MHz	5 kW	Aroroy
Power 104.3 (formerly Hot FM 104.3 Pavia)*	DYPV	104.3 MHz	0.5 kW	Pavia, Iloilo
Hot FM 98.7 Calinog	DYCL	98.7 MHz	2 kW	Calinog
Mix FM Oton (formerly Hot FM Oton)*	DYOT	103.5 MHz (formerly 95.7 MHz)	0.5 KW	Oton
Hot FM 96.1 Guimbal	DYIG	96.1 MHz	1 kW	Guimbal
Hot FM 92.9 Pototan	DYPT	92.9 MHz	1 kW	Pototan
Hot FM 104.3 Cadiz	DYCZ	104.3 MHz	1 kW	Cadiz, Negros Occidental
Hot FM 88.3 Sagay	DYRG	88.3 MHz	2 kW	Sagay, Negros Occidental
Hot FM 102.5 Sipalay	DYSY	102.5 MHz	1 kW	Sipalay
Hot FM 103.1 Ubay	DYZT	103.1 MHz	0.5 kW	Ubay, Bohol
102.7 Kiss FM Dumaguete	DYKS	102.7 MHz	5 kW	Dumaguete
Hot FM 99.1 Sindangan Zamboanga del Norte	DXMA	99.1 MHz	2 kW	Sindangan
Hot FM 100.5 Dipolog Zamboanga del Norte	DXBD	100.5 MHz	1 kW	Dipolog
Hot FM 105.3 Buug, Zamboanga Sibugay	DXXB	105.3 MHz	1 kW	Buug
Hot FM 95.3 Ipil, Zamboanga Sibugay	DXDS	95.3 MHz	1 kW	Ipil, Zamboanga Sibugay
Hot FM 87.9 Malvar, Zamboanga Sibugay	DXMV	87.9 MHz	1 kW	Malvar, Zamboanga Sibugay
Hot FM 93.5 Nasipit, Agusan del Norte	DXRR	93.5 MHz	1 kW	Nasipit
Hot FM 89.5 Mainit, Surigao del Norte	DXMH	89.5 MHz	1 kW	Mainit
Hot FM 101.5 Bakaoan, North Cotabato	DXBK	101.5 MHz	1 kW	Bakaoan, North Cotabato
