= DZRH (disambiguation) =

DZRH is a flagship radio station serving the Mega Manila market.

DZRH may also refer to the following assets by MBC:

Television

- DZRH-TV, a defunct television station
- DZRH News Television, a cable and satellite news channel (formerly RHTV)

Radio

- DWSR-AM, a relay station known as DZRH Lucena
- DXGH, a relay station known as DZRH General Santos
- DXTS, an originating station known as DZRH News FM General Santos
- DXRF, a relay station known as DZRH Davao
- DYDH-AM, a relay station known as DZRH Iloilo
- DYPH-AM, a relay station known as DZRH Palawan
- DYTH-AM, a relay station known as DZRH Tacloban
- DYXR, a relay station known as DZRH Bacolod
