= Metro Bacolod =

- Metropolitan area
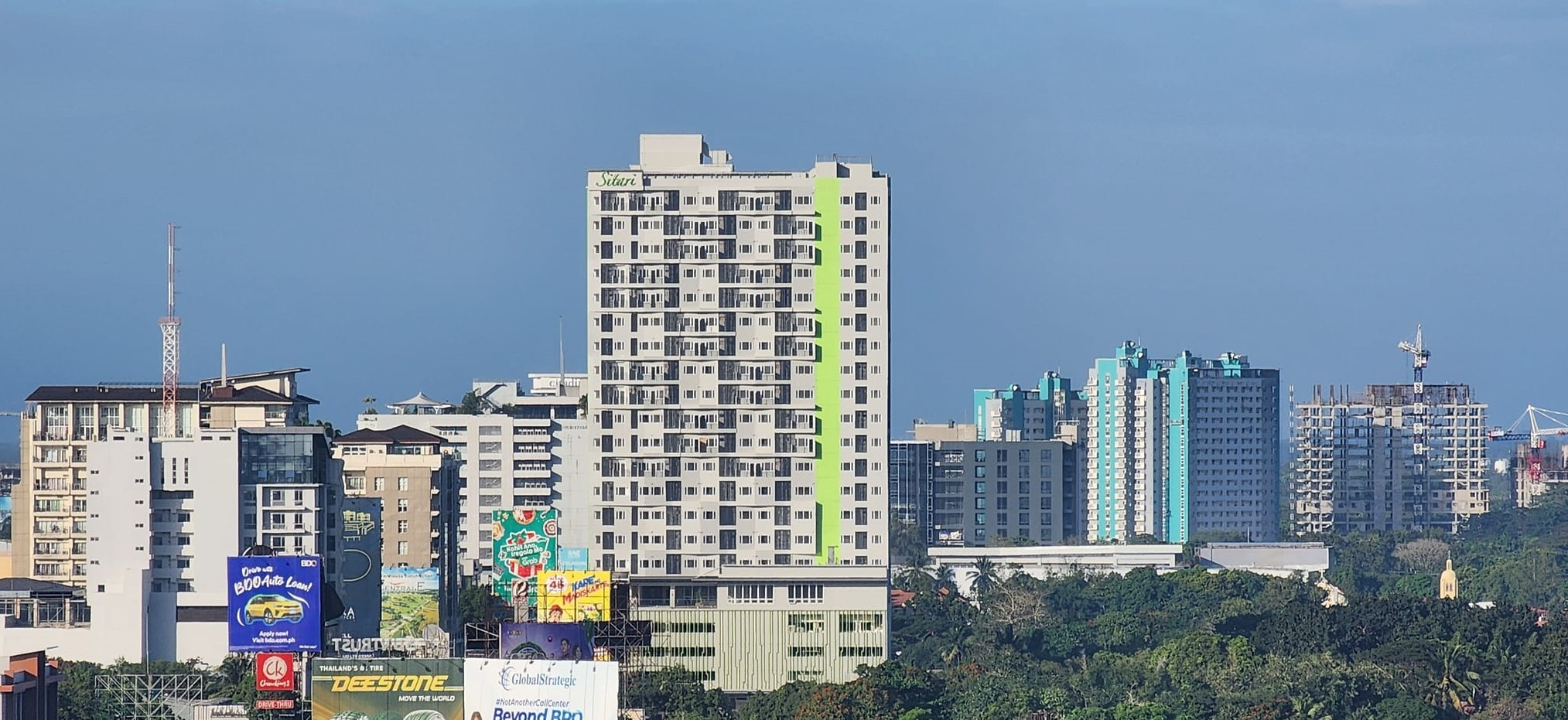
- Skyline of Urban Bacolod

- Metro Bacolod within Negros Occidental
- Country: Philippines
- Region: Negros Island Region
- Province: Negros Occidental
- Cities: Bacolod; Bago; Don Salvador Benedicto; Murcia; Pulupandan; Silay; Talisay City
- Legislative districts: Lone District of Bacolod; 1st Districts of Negros Occidental; 3rd District of Negros Occidental; 4th District of Negros Occidental
- Barangays: 178
- Largest city: Bacolod

Government
  - Type: Metropolis

Area
  - Total: 106.329 km^{2} (41.054 sq mi)

Population (2024)
  - Total: 1,145,150
  - Density: 10,769/km^{2} (27,890/sq mi)
- Time zone: UTC+8 (Philippine Standard Time)

Metro Bacolod (Hiligaynon: Kaulohan nga Bacolod; Tagalog: Kalakhang Bacolod) is a metropolitan area located in the Negros Island Region in the Philippines . This metropolitan area as defined by the National Economic and Development Authority (NEDA) has an estimated population of 1,145,150 inhabitants.

The metropolitan area is centered on Bacolod, the provincial capital, and includes the component cities of Bago, Silay Talisay, and the municipalities of Don Salvador Benedicto, Murcia, and Pulupandan, all located in the province of Negros Occidental. Metro Bacolod is among those identified by the National Framework for Physical Planning: 2001–2030 as one of the country's industrial, financial and technological centers.

== Cities and municipalities ==
All of the cities and municipalities of Metro Bacolod are located in the province of Negros Occidental.

City	Population (2024)	Barangays	Pop. density (per km^{2})	Area (km^{2})	Income class	Legal class	Zip code
Bacolod	624,787	61	3,840	162.67	1st class	Highly urbanized city	6100
Bago	192,993	24	481	420.20	1st Class	Component city	6101
Don Salvador Benedicto	28,231	7	170	420	4th class	Municipality	6117
Murcia	21101	23	836	322.86	1st class	Municipality	6129
Pulupandan	31,942	20	230	18.49	4th Class	Municipality	6102
Silay	136,802	16	592	214.80	3rd Class	Component city	6116
Talisay	109,294	27	510	201.18	4th Class	Component city	6115

== Media ==
=== AM stations ===
- DYWB Bombo Radyo 630 (People's Broadcasting Service, Inc.)
- DYEZ Aksyon Radyo 684 (Manila Broadcasting Company)
- DYHB RMN 747 (Radio Mindanao Network)
- DYRL Radyo Pilipino 1035 (Radyo Pilipino Corporation)
- DZRH Nationwide 1080 (Pacific Broadcasting System; relay station of DZRH 666 in Manila)
- DYAF Radyo Totoo 1143 (Catholic Bishops Conference of the Philippines; operated by the Diocese of Bacolod; a member of the Catholic Media Network)
- 1233 DYVS (Far East Broadcasting Company)
- GMA Super Radyo DYSB 1341 (GMA Network, Inc.; relay station of DZBB 594 in Manila)
- RPN DYKB Radyo Ronda 1404 (Radio Philippines Network)

=== FM stations ===
- 90.3 XFM (Southern Broadcasting Network; operated by Yes2Health Advertising, Inc.)
- 91.1 FM Radio (Philippine Collective Media Corporation)
- 91.9 Love Radio (Manila Broadcasting Company; operated by Muñoz Broadcasting Concepts)
- 94.3 iFM (Radio Mindanao Network)
- 95.9 Star FM (People's Broadcasting Service, Inc.)
- 96.7 XFM (DCG Radio-TV Network; operated by Yes2Health Advertising, Inc.) relay based 90.3 XFM.
- RJ 99.9 (Rajah Broadcasting Network; relay station of DZRJ 100.3 in Manila)
- 100.3 Radyo Negrense (Provincial Government of Negros Occidental)
- 101.5 K5 News FM Bacolod (DYOO) (Fairwaves Broadcasting Network; operated by 5K Broadcasting Network, Inc.)
- FM Radio 92.3 (Nation Broadcasting Corporation and operated by Philippine Collective Media Corporation; relay station of DWFM 92.3 in Manila)
- 103.1 Brigada News FM (Baycomms Broadcasting Corporation)
- 105.5 Easy Rock (Cebu Broadcasting Company; operated by Muñoz Broadcasting Concepts)
- Klick FM 106.3 (Quest Broadcasting, Inc.; operated by 5K Broadcasting Network, Inc.)
- Barangay FM 107.1 (GMA Network, Inc.)

=== TV stations ===
- DYAG - ALLTV-4 (Advanced Media Broadcasting System; formerly from ABS-CBN Corportation)
- DYKB - RPN-8 (Radio Philippines Network)
- DWGM - GMA-13 Bacolod (GMA Network, Inc.)
- DYGB - Hope Channel-24 (Seventh-day Adventist Church/Gateway UHF Television Broadcasting)
- DYGM - GMA-30 Murcia/Negros Occidental (GMA Network, Inc.)
- DYTE - TV5-32 (TV5 Network, Inc.)

=== Cable & satellite TV providers ===
- SkyCable – Bacolod
- New Bacolod Cable TV – Bacolod
- My Channel Cable Network – Bacolod, La Carlota, Pulupandan & Silay
- Cignal TV
- G Sat
- Bago City Cable TV Network – Bago
- Prime Cable Network – Murcia, Pulupandan & Talisay
- Negros Cable TV – Silay
- Smile Cable TV – Talisay
- Malihao Cable TV – Victorias
- Vision Ventures Cable TV – La Carlota

== Transportation ==
Bacolod–Silay International Airport Terminal in Silay City

=== Airport ===
Bacolod–Silay International Airport is located in Silay City. Metro Bacolod is approximately 1hr 13mins by air from Ninoy Aquino International Airport and approximately 30–45 minutes by air from Mactan–Cebu International Airport. Commercial Airlines serving the metropolitan area are Philippine Airlines, Cebu Pacific Air, PAL Express, Philippines Air Asia and Cebgo.

=== Roads ===
Bacolod has two main roads, Lacson Street to the north and Araneta Street to the south. The city has a good traffic plan lay-out and very seldom has traffic jams. The streets in the downtown area are one way, making Bacolod free from traffic congestion. Recently, Bacolod is experiencing an increase in traffic congestion due to an increase in number of vehicles and a perceived lack of implementation of traffic rules by the local government.

=== Seaports ===
BREDCO Port Terminal

Banago Wharf and BREDCO Port are the vessels entry point in Bacolod. It has daily access to Iloilo, with different shipping lines such as 2GO Travel, Weesam Express, SuperCat, Ocean Jet, Montenegro Lines, FastCat, and Tri Star megalink. 2GO Travel routes from Bacolod going Manila, Iloilo and Cagayan de Oro. Bacolod is 18–23 hours from the Port of Manila, 2–3 hours from Dumangas Port and 45 minutes- 1hr from the Port of Iloilo.

== Gallery ==
=== Bacolod ===
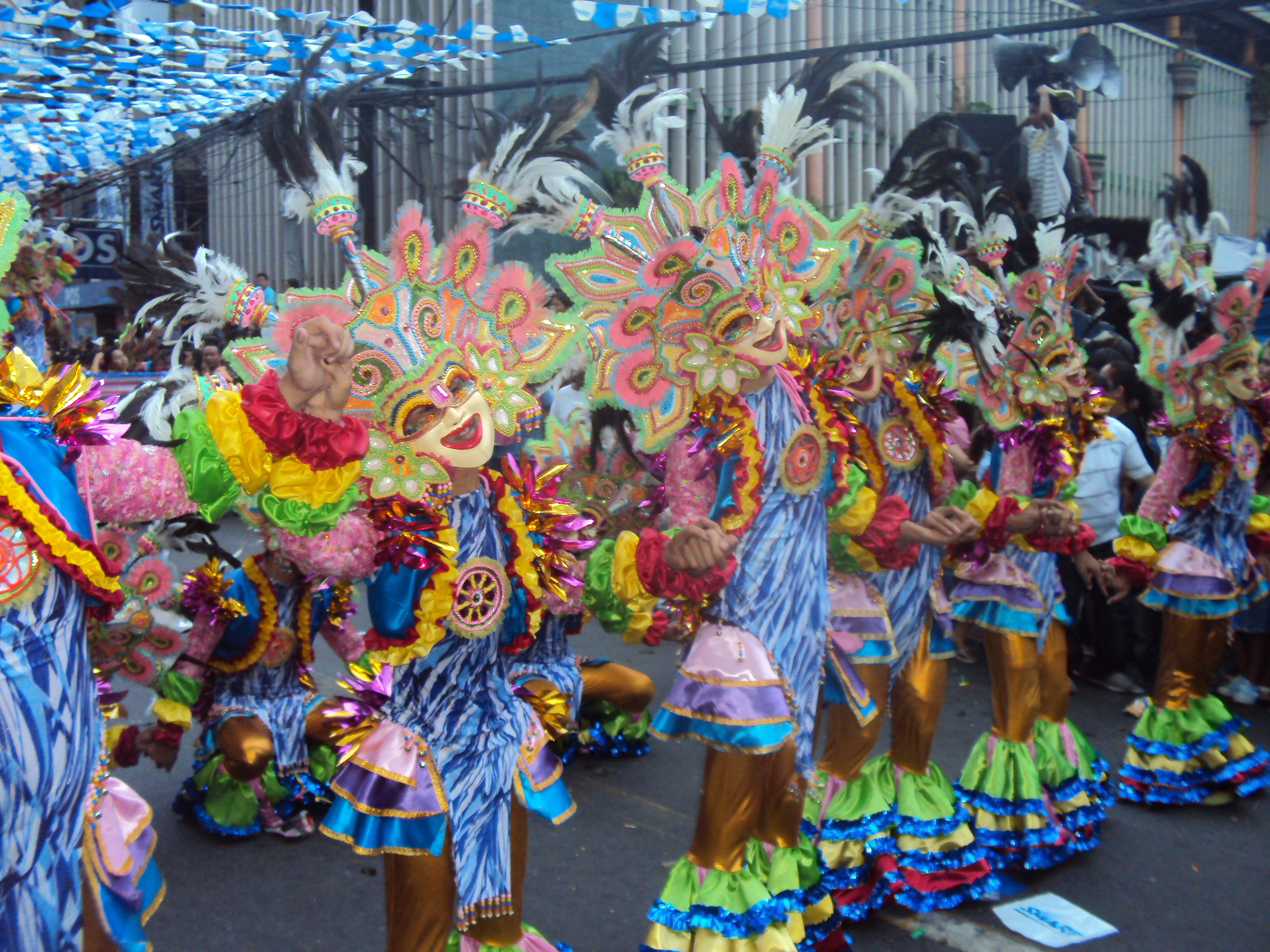
MassKara Festival Street Dancing

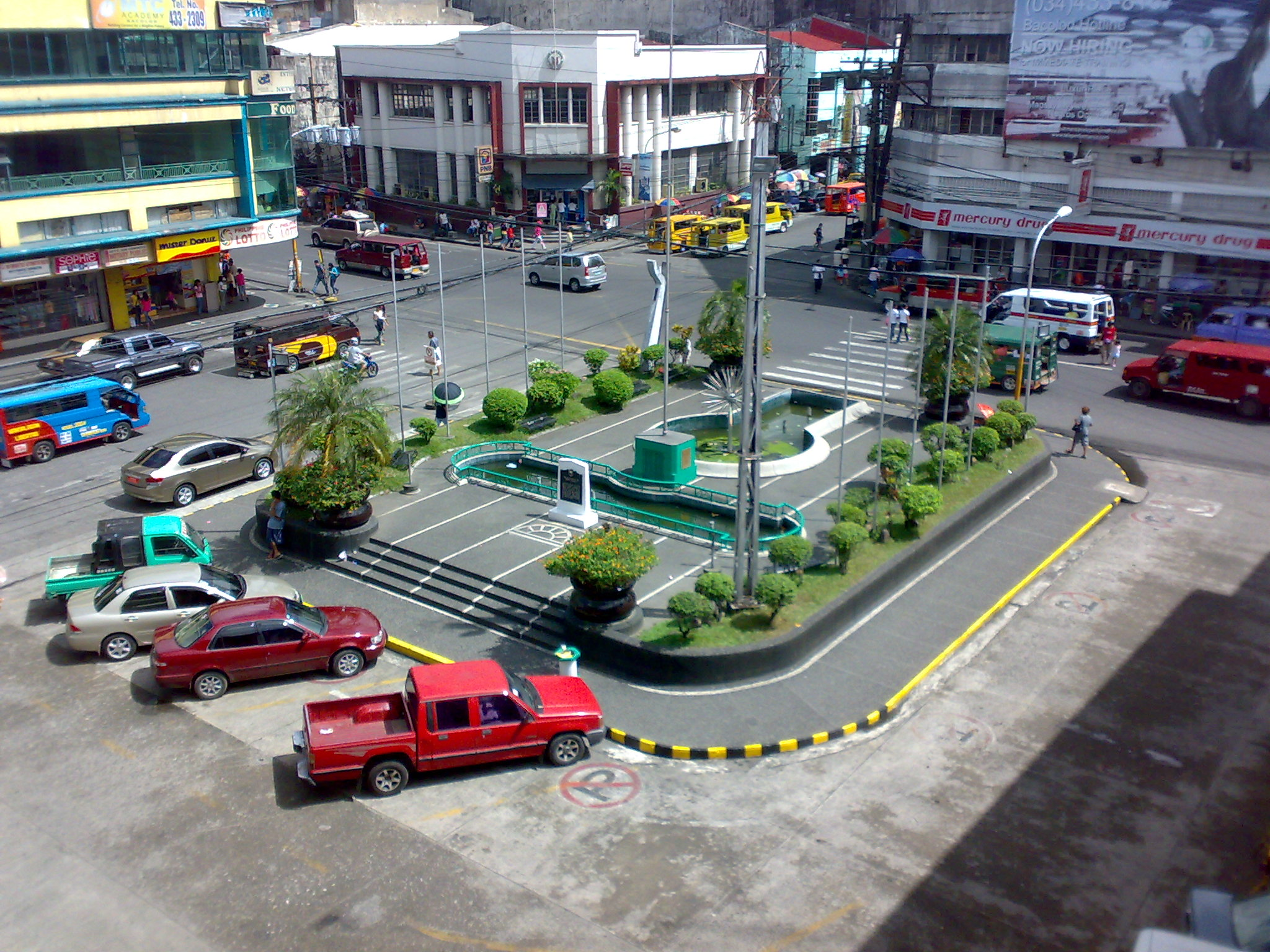
Fountain of Justice and downtown Bacolod

Front view of Bacolod City New Government Center

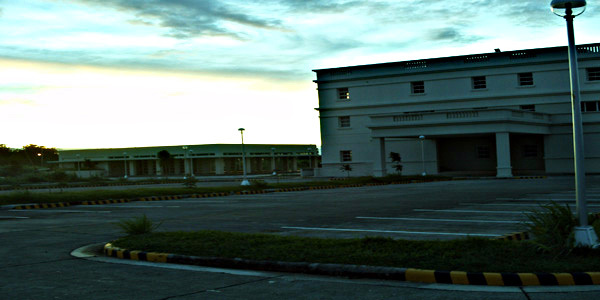
Back view of Bacolod City New Government Center

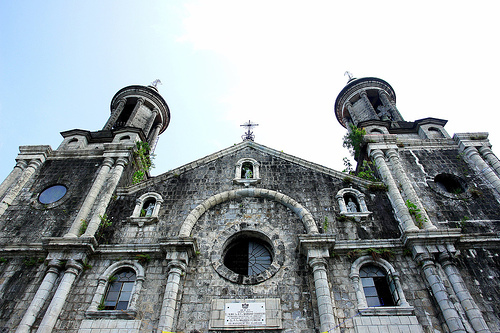
San Sebastian Cathedral

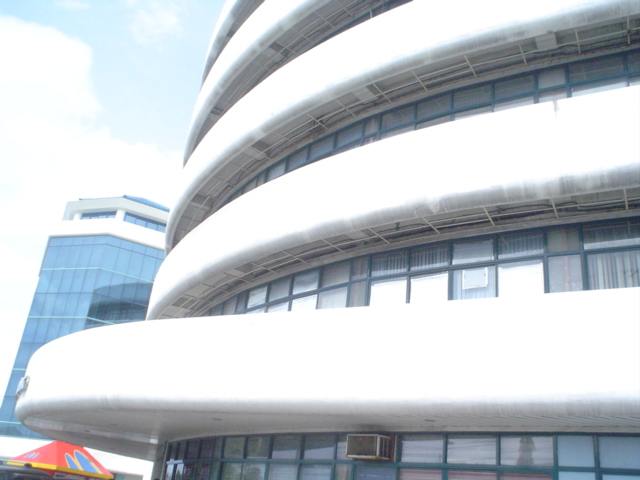
The Riverside Medical Center Inc. Medical Arts Building along BS Aquino Drive

Philippine National Bank building, along Lacson Street

SM City Bacolod

Robinsons Place Bacolod, along Lacson Street in Barangay Mandalagan

La Salle Coliseum of the University of St. La Salle

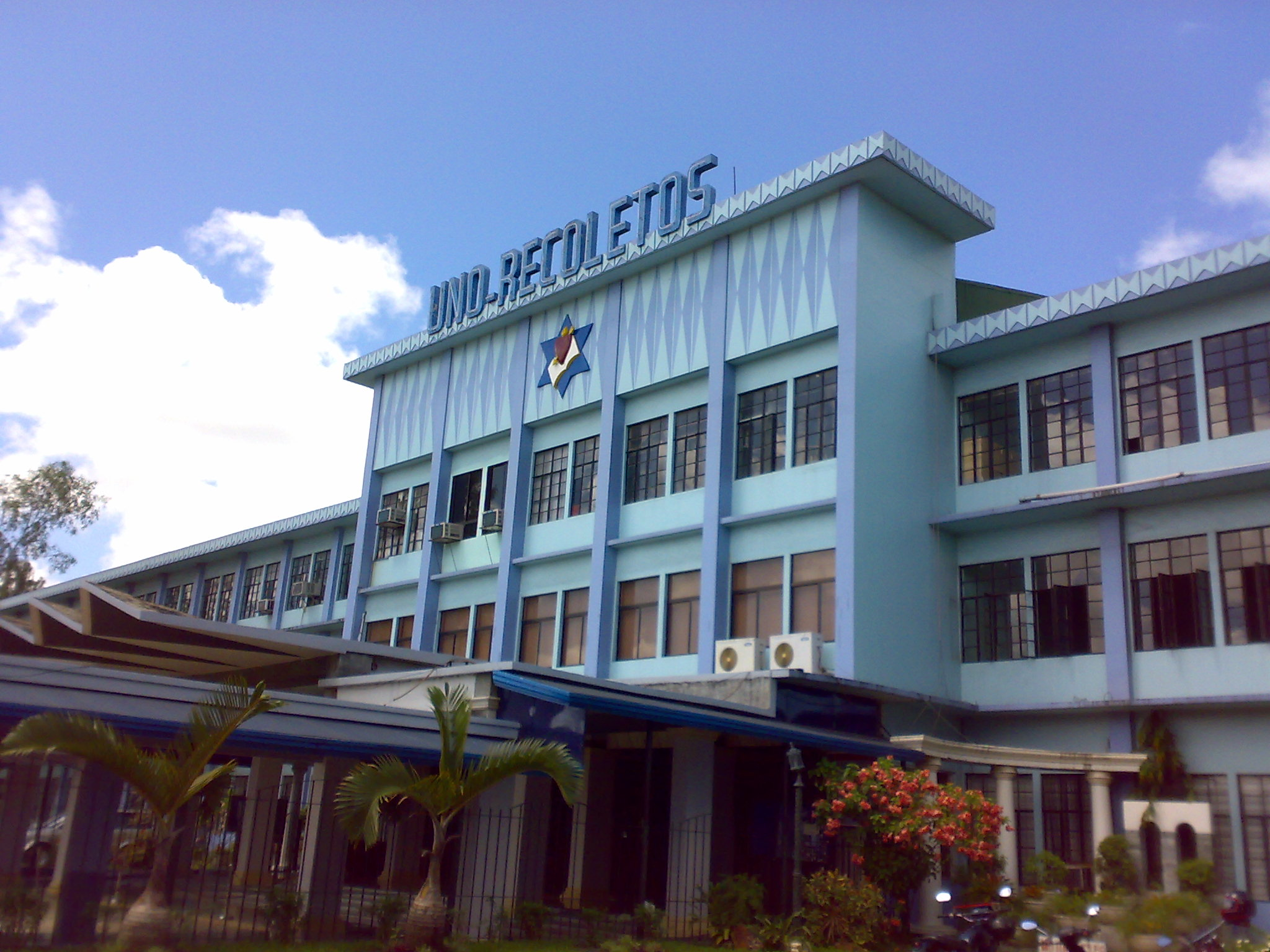
UNO-Recoletos façade

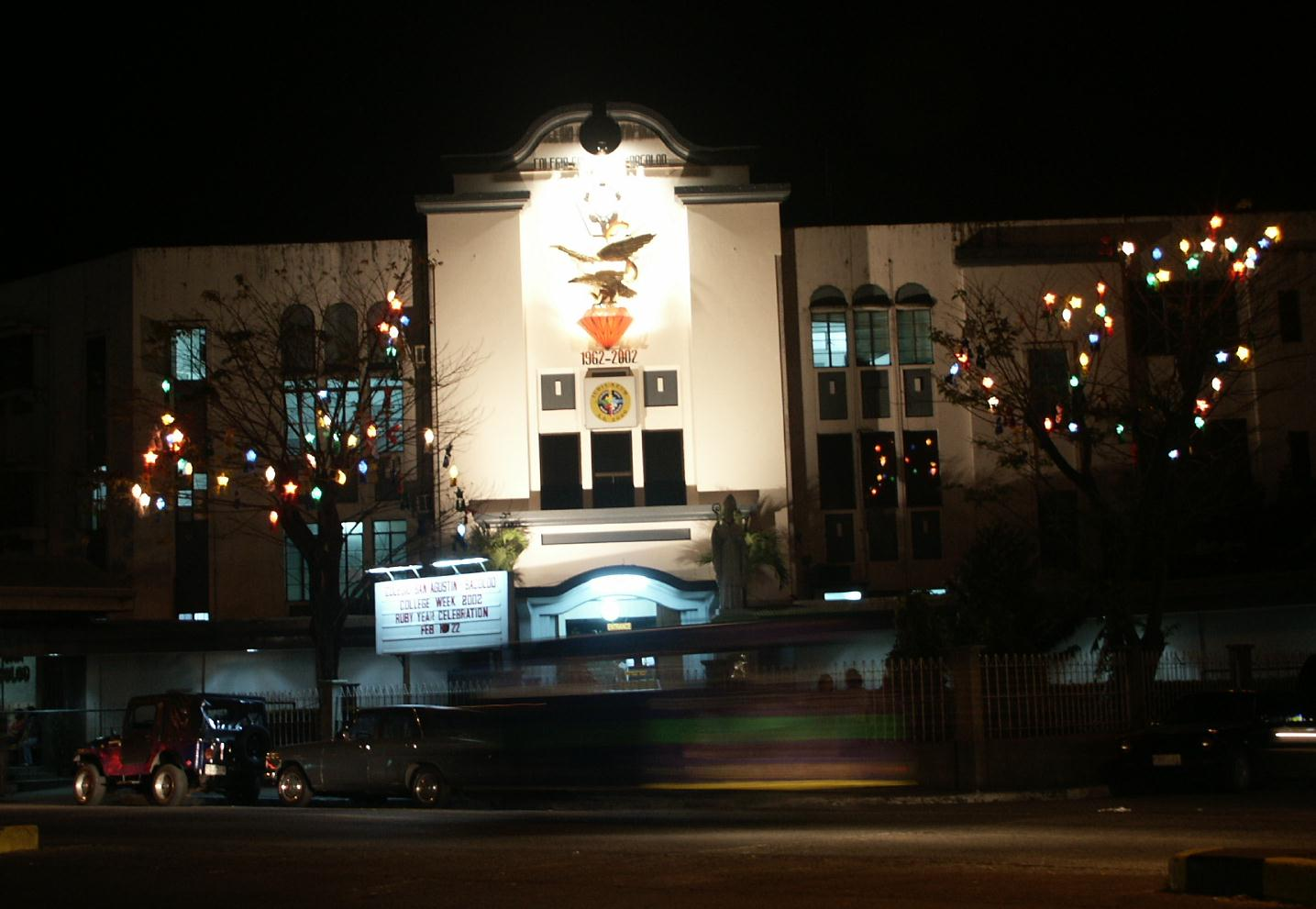
Colegio San Agustin – Bacolod administration building facade

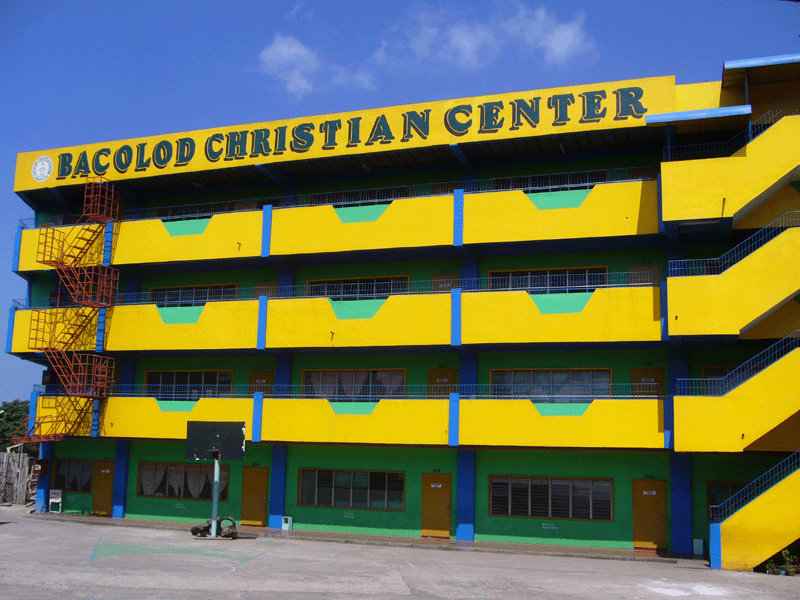
Bacolod Christian College of Negros

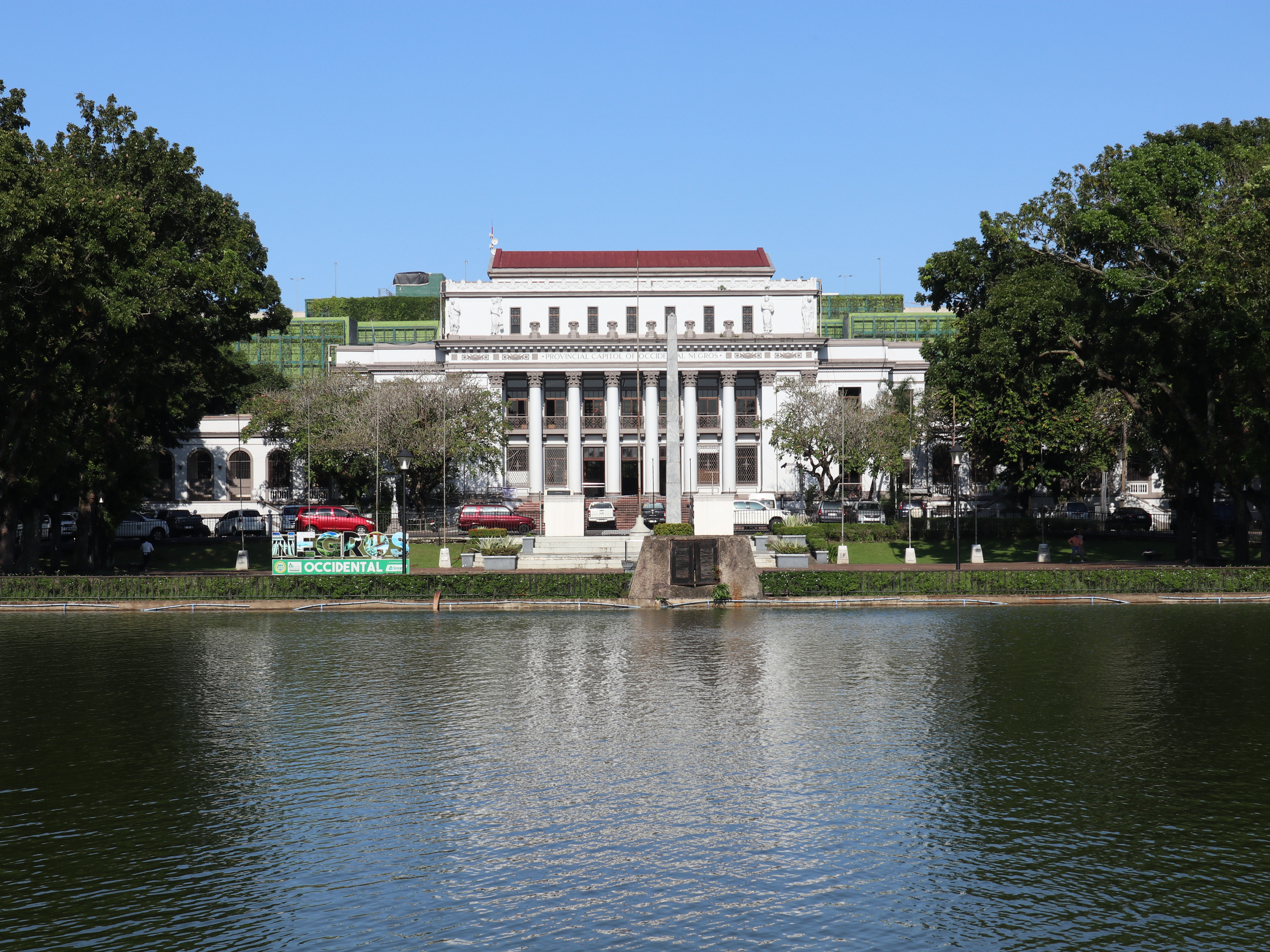
A view of the Capitol Park and Lagoon looking towards the Negros Occidental Provincial Capitol building

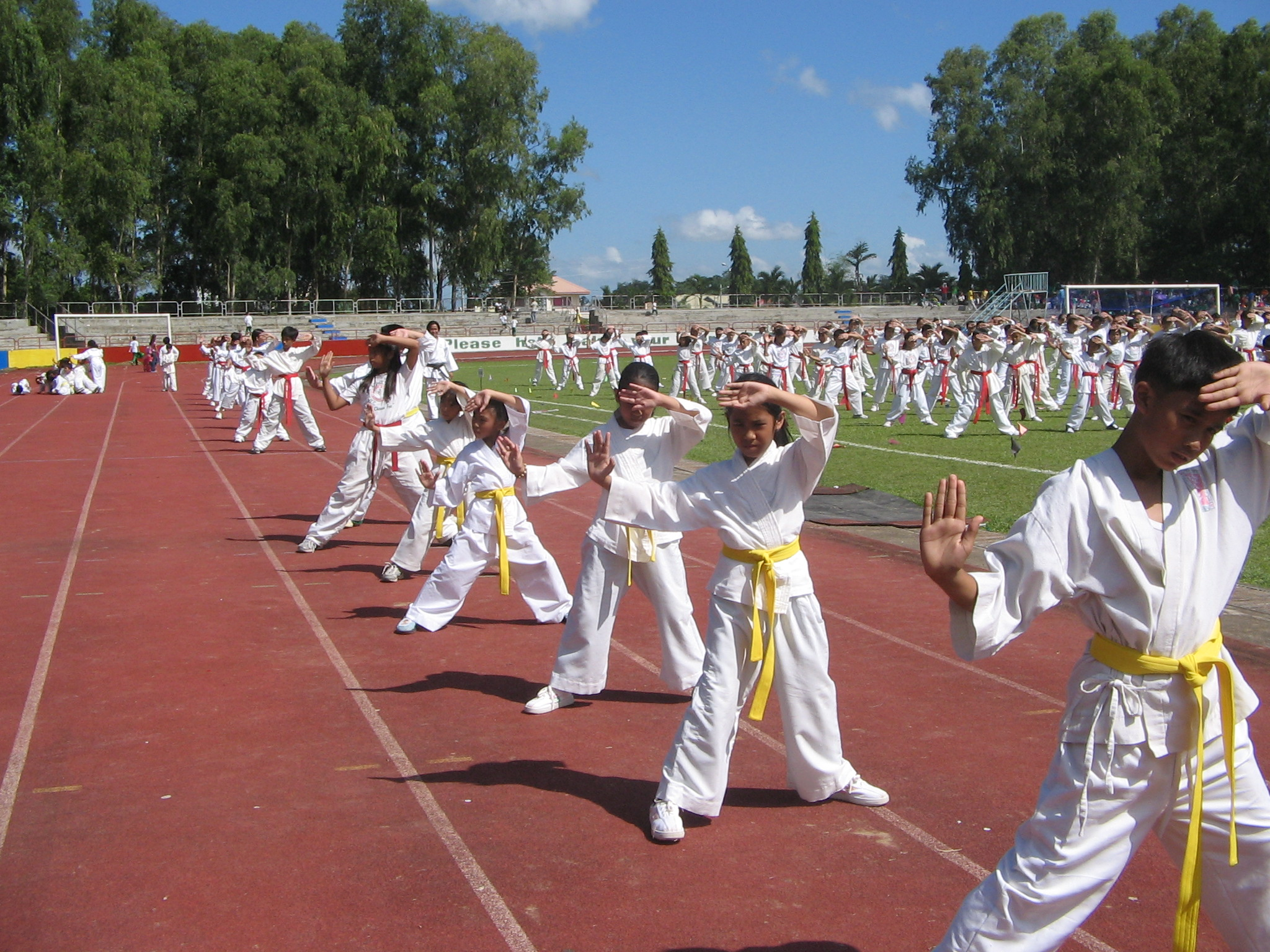
Panaad Stadium

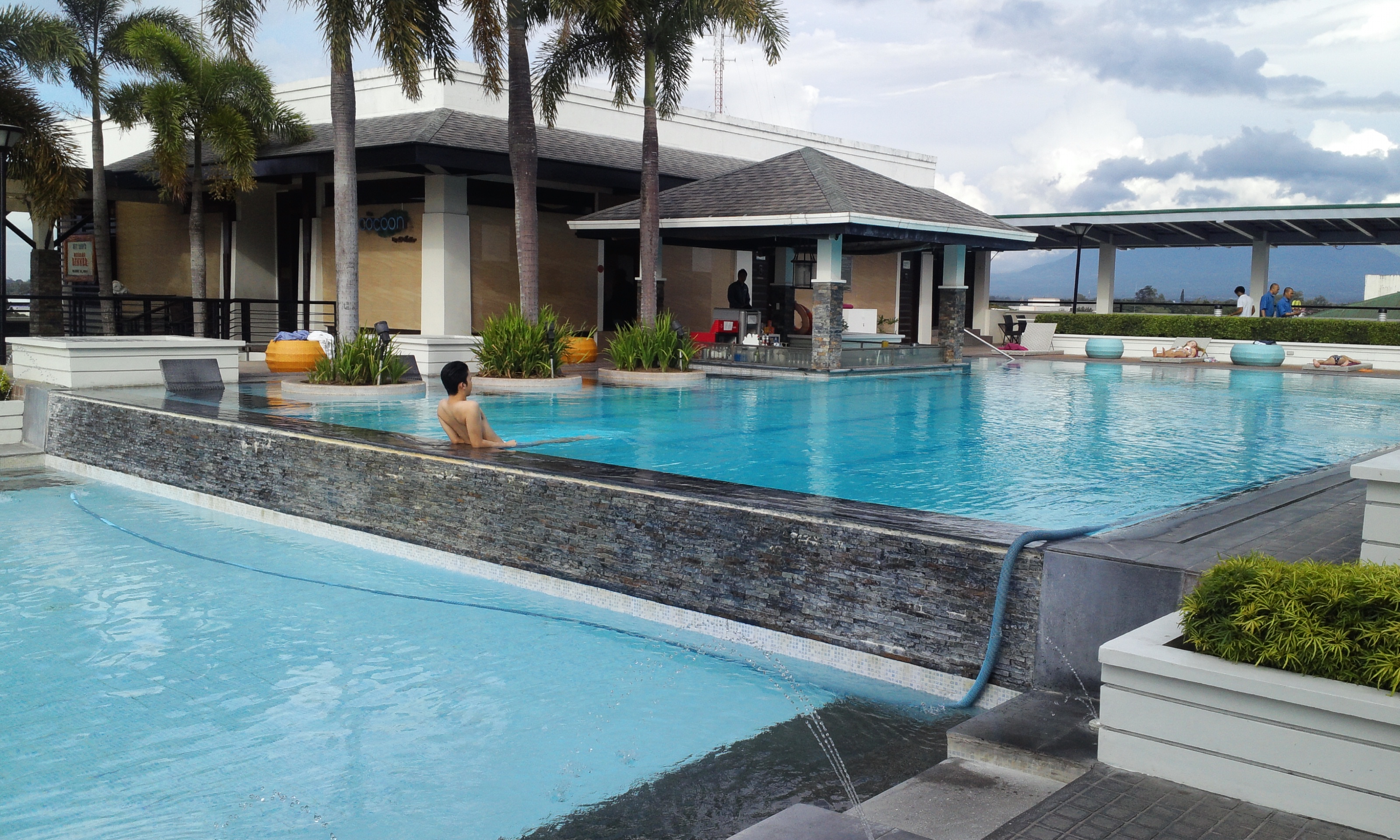
L'Fisher Chalet (daytime)

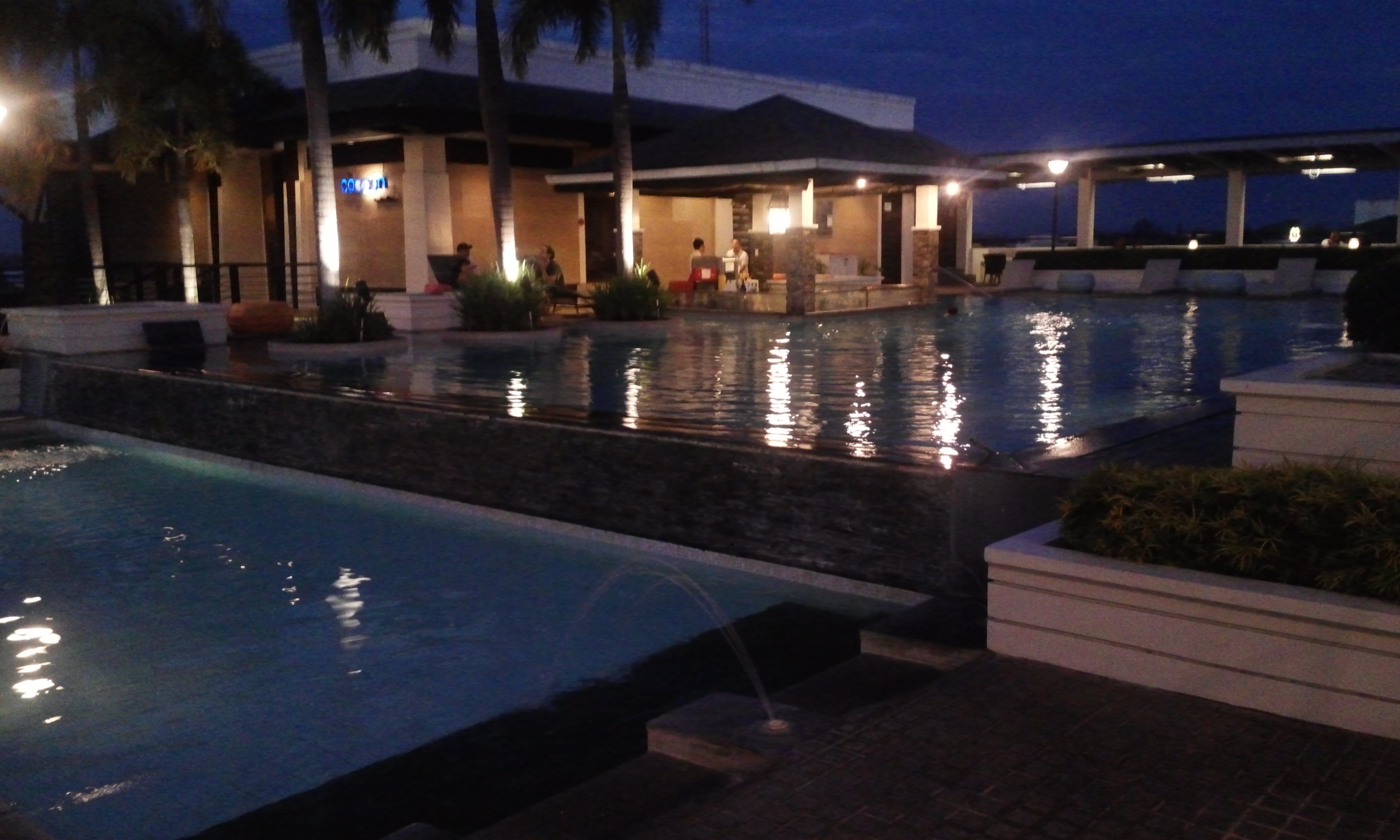
L'Fisher Chalet (at night)

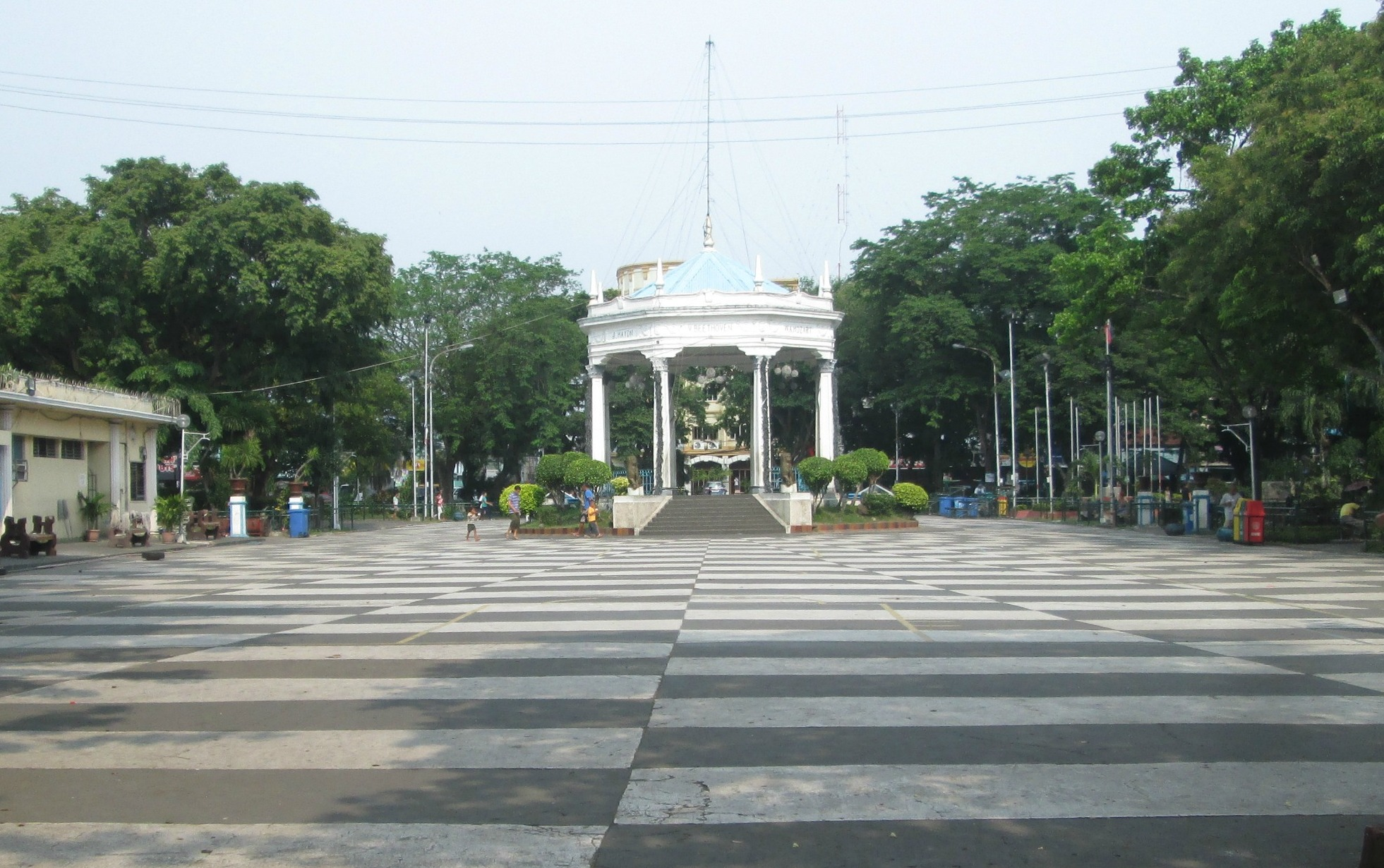
Bacolod Public Plaza

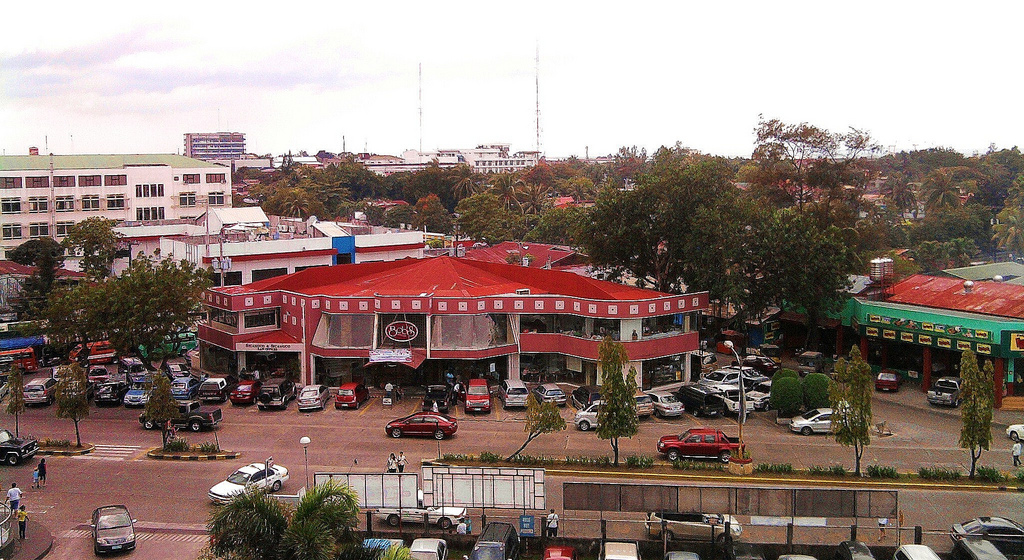
North Drive Bacolod

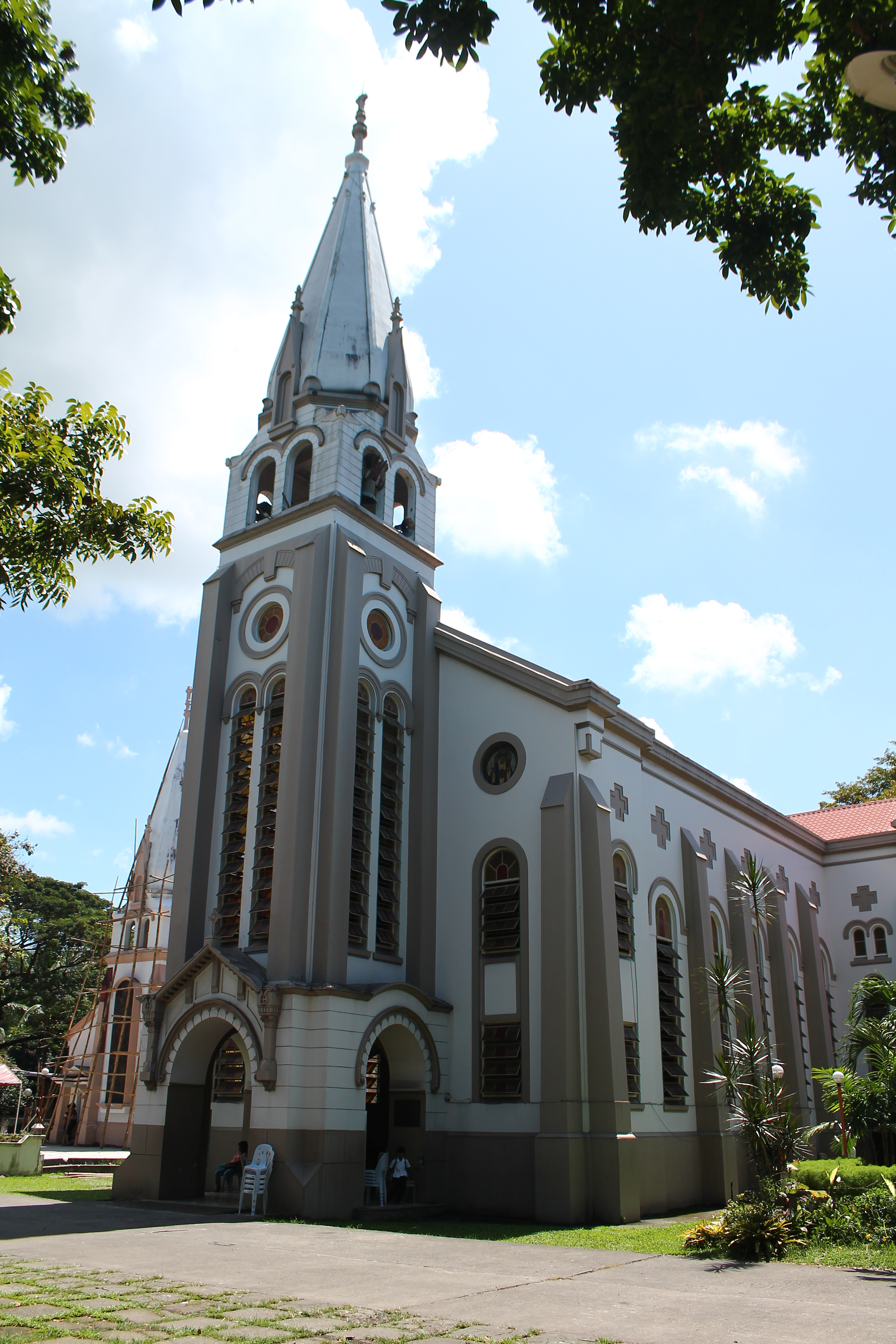
Sacred Heart Seminary and Shrine – Bacolod (Lupit Church)

=== Silay ===
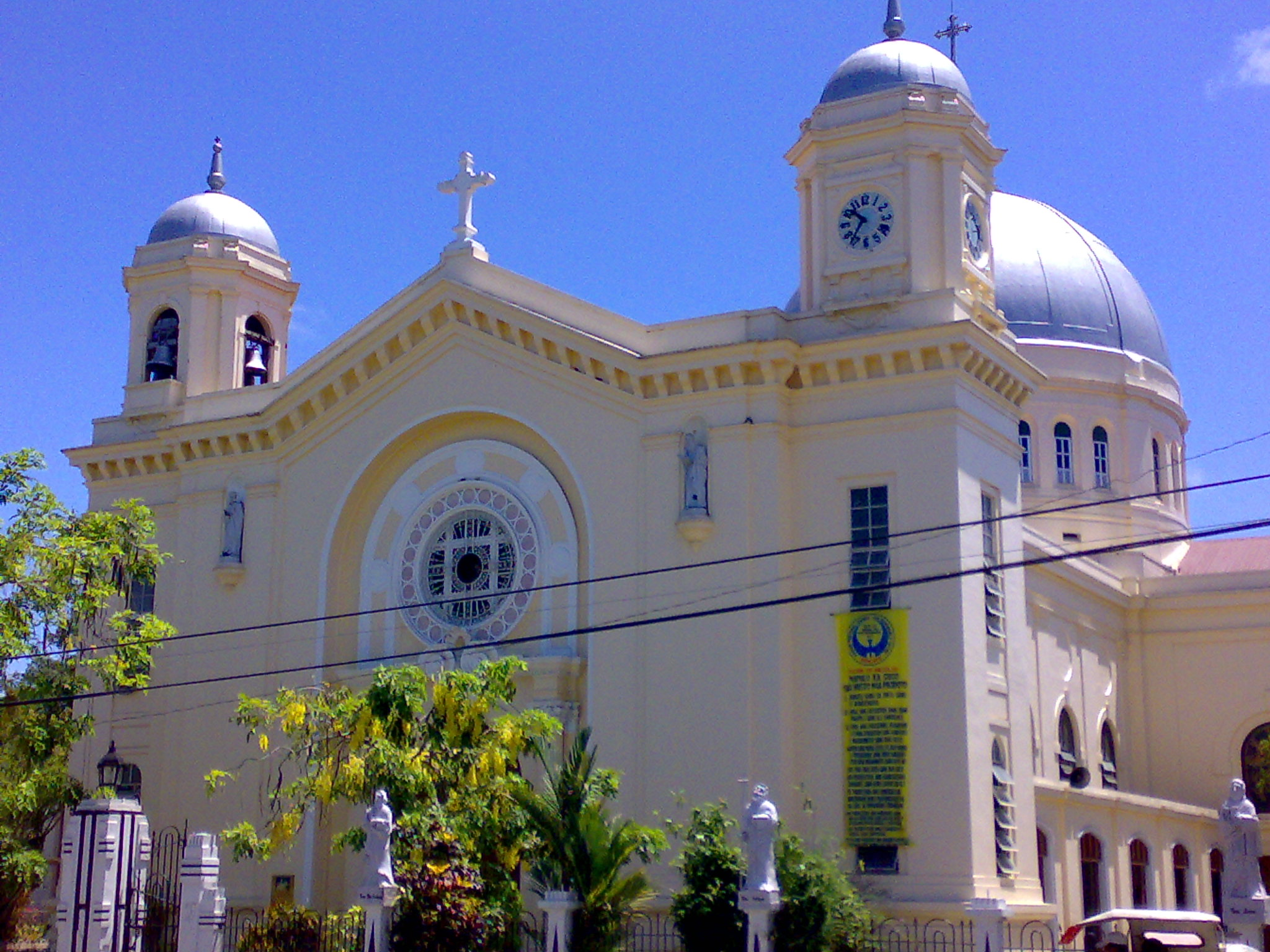
San Diego Pro-cathedral

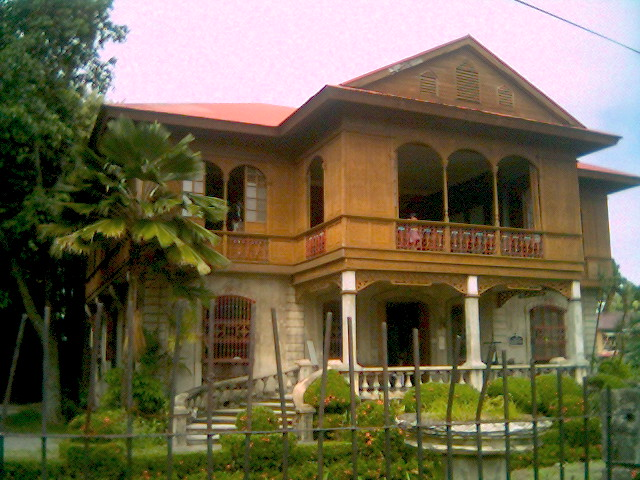
Balay Negrense

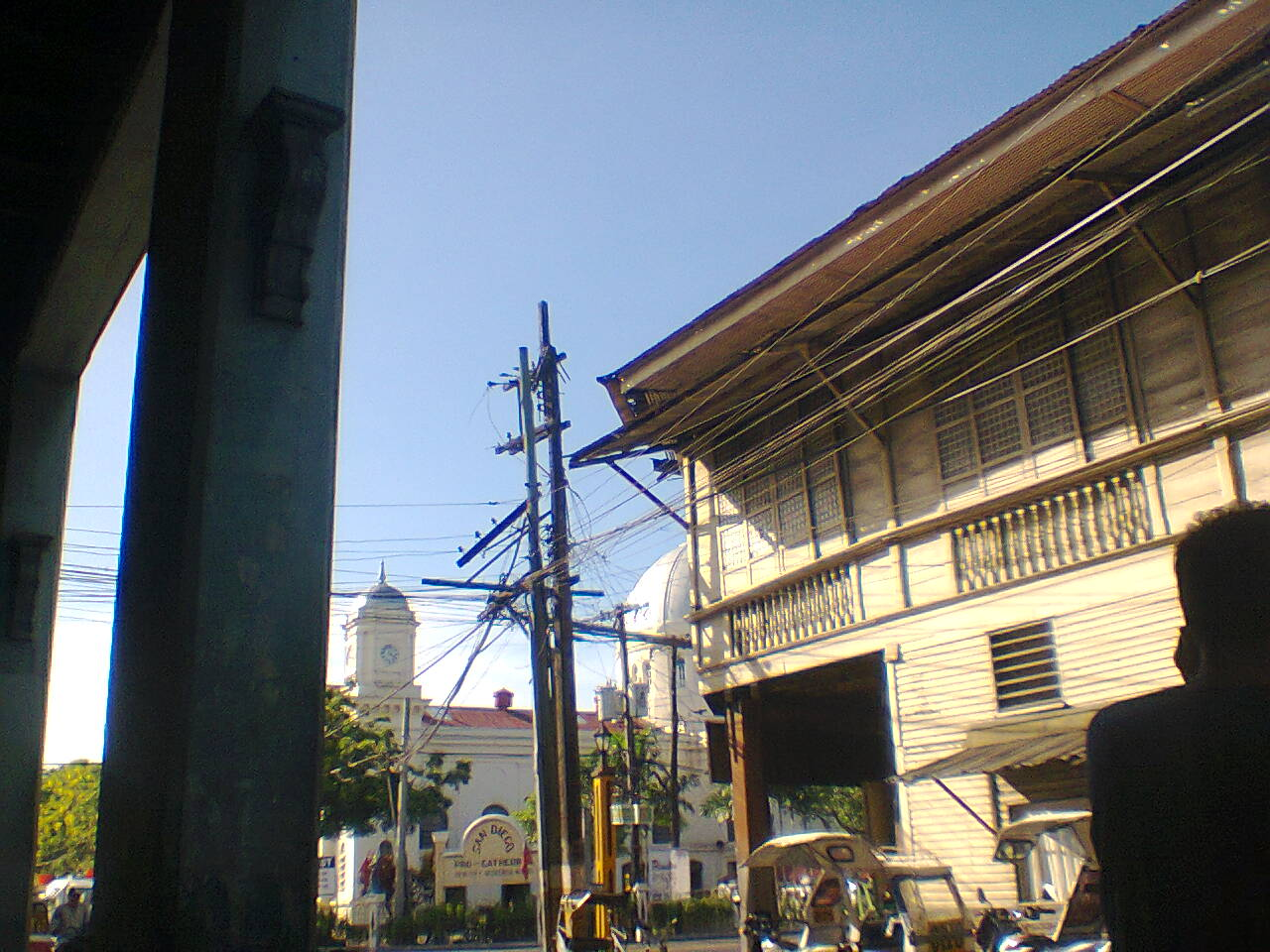
Silay City ancestral houses

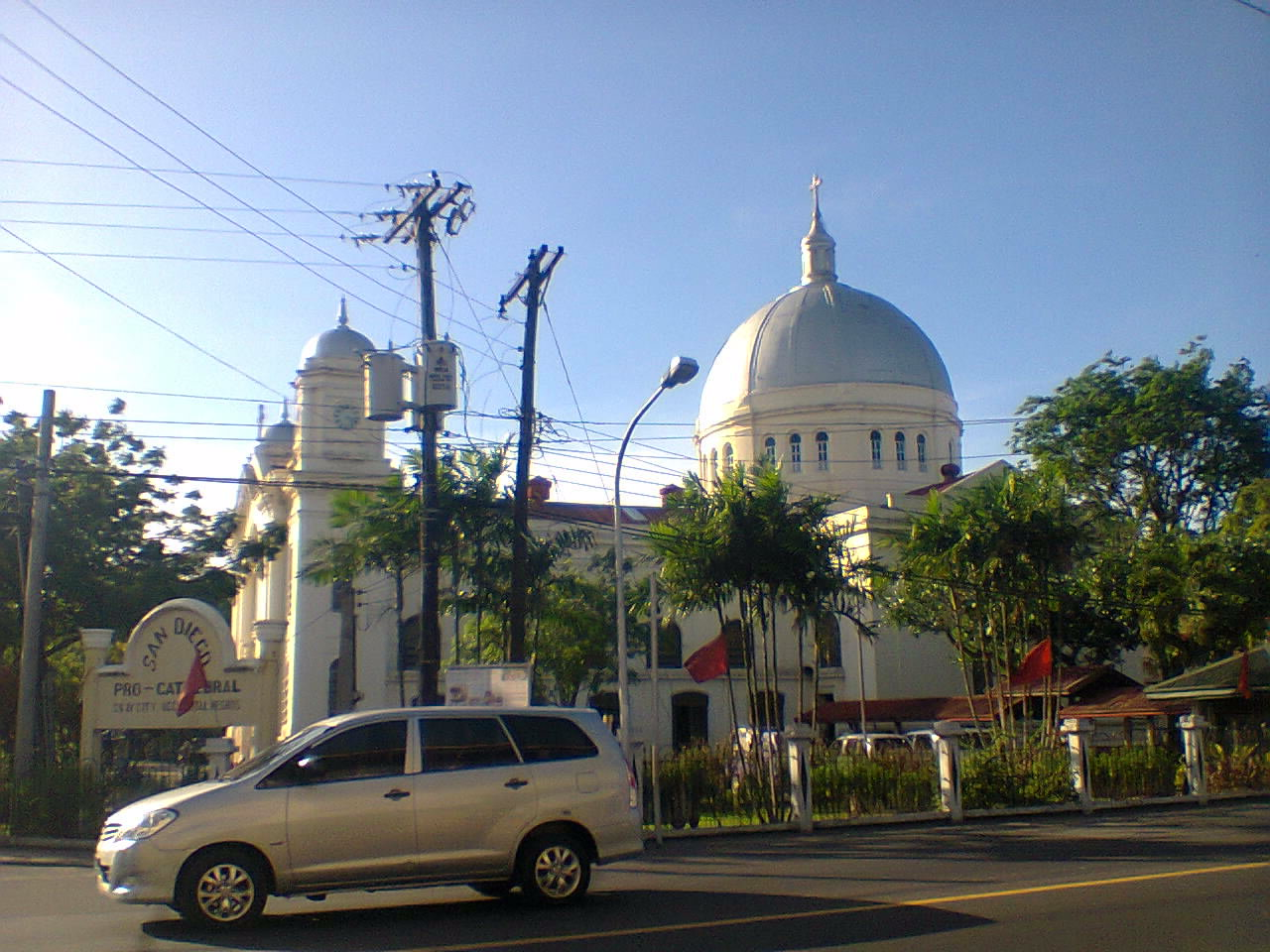
San Diego Pro-cathedral

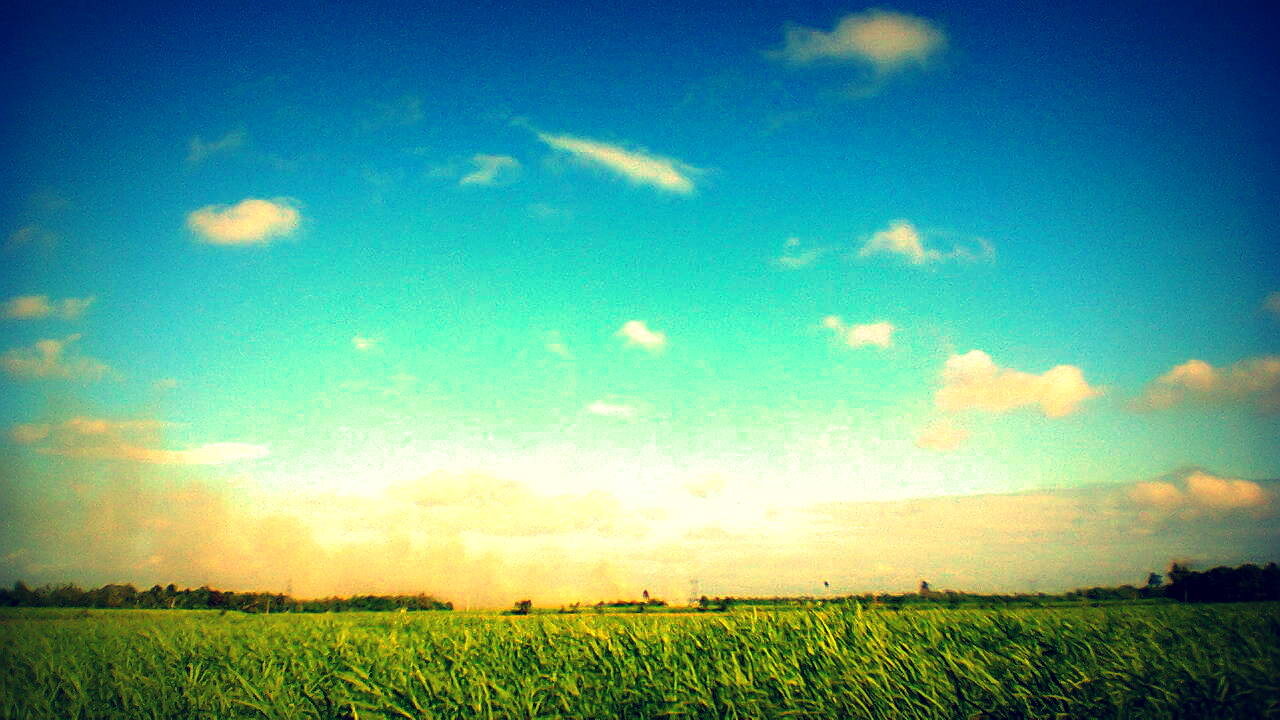
Sugarcane fields, near the City Center

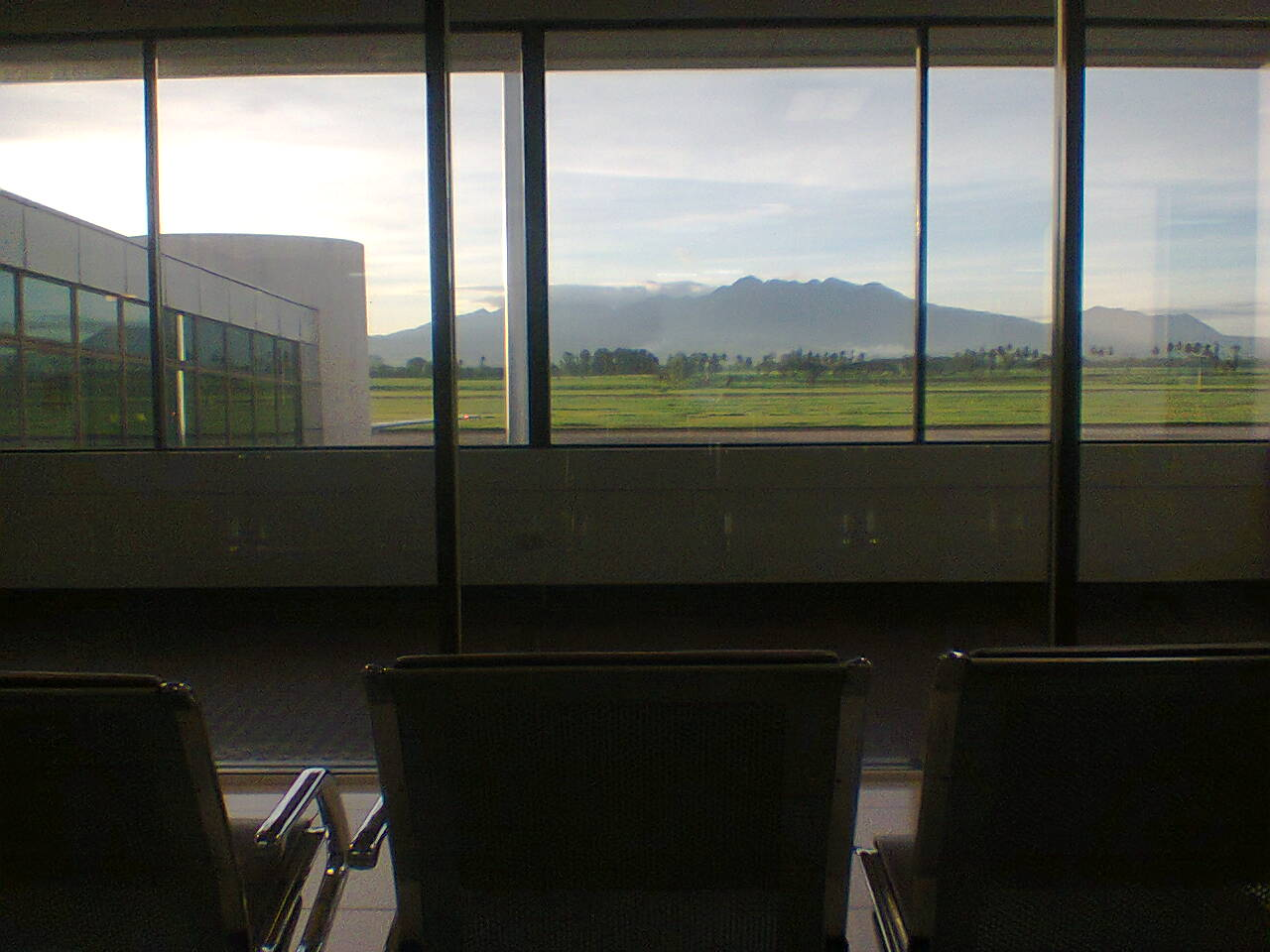
Pre-departure area, Bacolod–Silay International Airport

=== Talisay ===
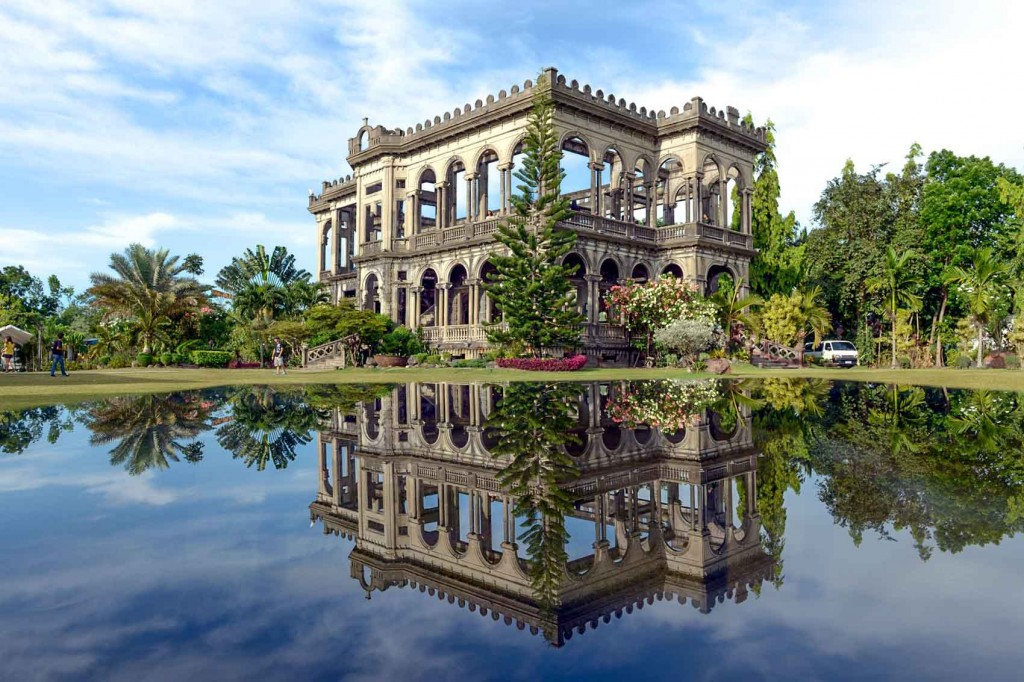
The Lacson Ruins

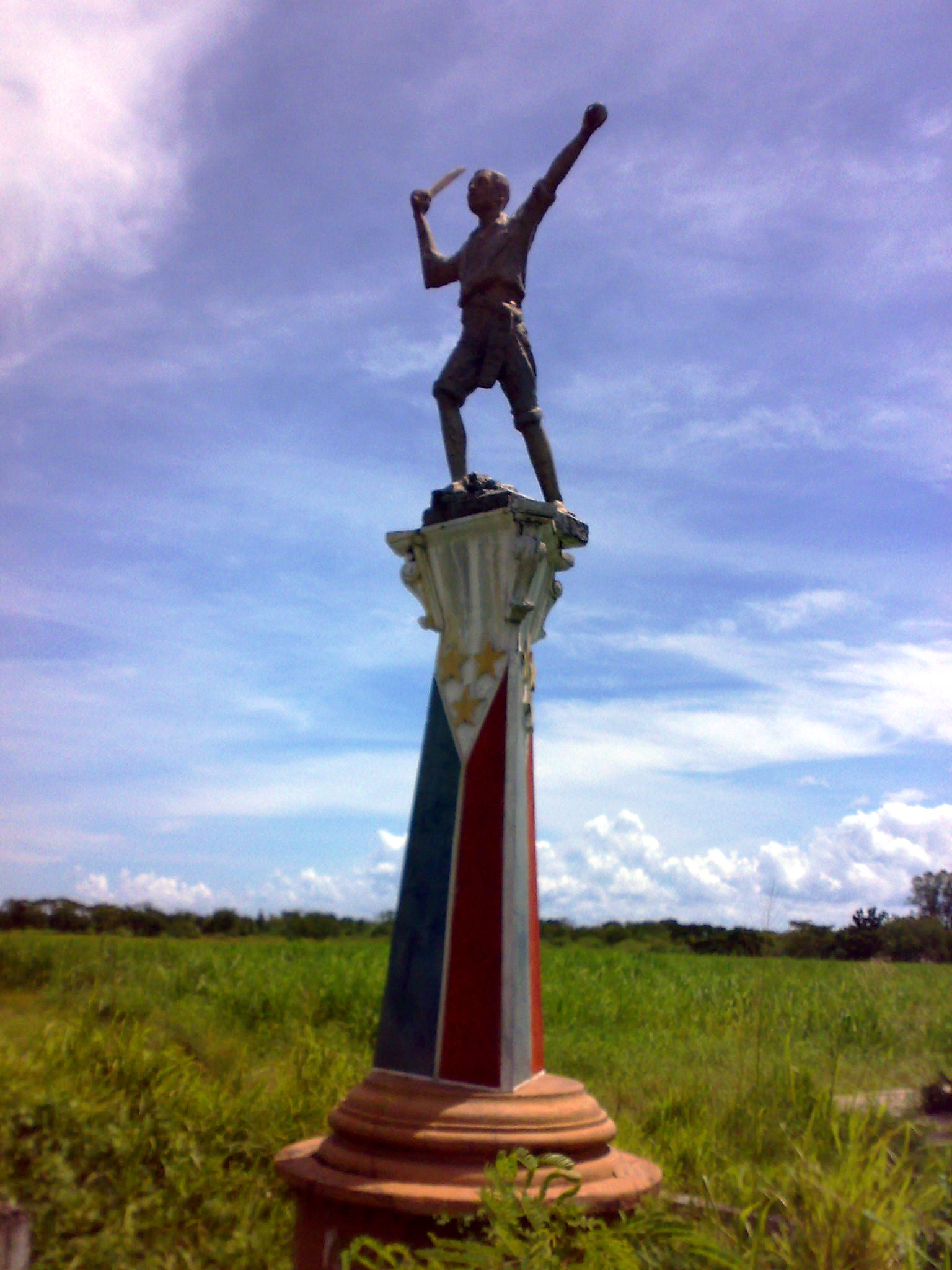
Statue of Andres Bonifacio

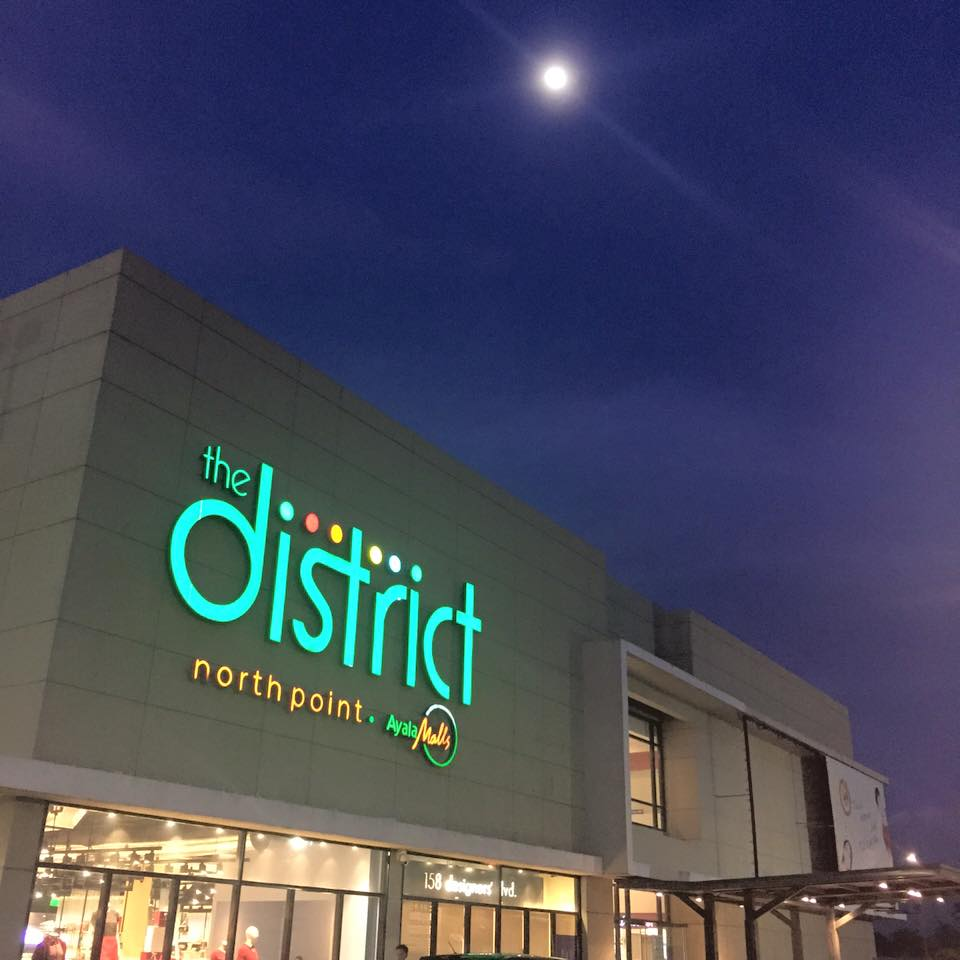
The District – North Point at Ayala North Point

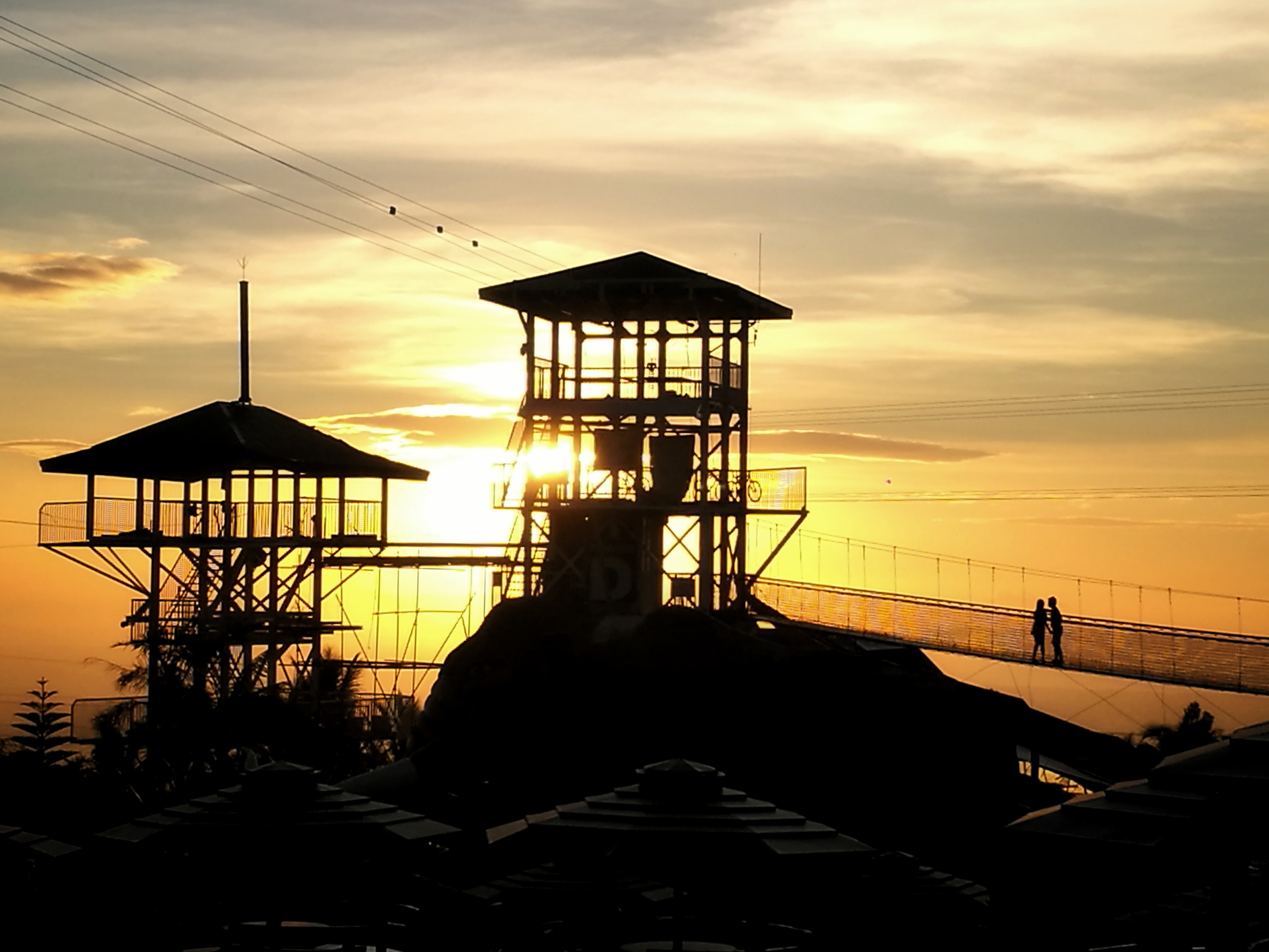
Campuestohan Highland Resort

== Proposed developments ==
Former Bacolod Mayor Monico Puentevella proposed the creation of Metro Bacolod Development Authority (MBDA) which was supported by the former Governor of Negros Occidental, Alfredo Marañon Jr. The cities of Bacolod, Talisay, Silay, Bago, and the municipality of Murcia will be the components of MBDA.

Metro Bacolod Chamber of Commerce and Industry (MBCCI) president Frank Carbon believes that turning Bacolod and surrounding places into a metropolitan area is an essential factor in progress. He envisions Metro Bacolod to be composed of Bacolod, Silay, Talisay and Bago cities, as well as Murcia and Don Salvador Benedicto towns. There is a need to create a master plan for Metro Bacolod and the Metro Bacolod Development Authority (MBDA) which will help this capital city and nearby areas achieve their long-term goals and boost their business sector, Carbon said.

This plan divides the cities and municipalities to the following industries:

- Bacolod: Capital city, metropolitan core and financial center
- Bago: Industrial center
- Murcia: Agro-tourism hub
- Silay City: Heritage and cultural hub
- Talisay City: Village city and sub-urban development
- Don Salvador Benedicto: Summer capital

== See also ==
- Metropolitan areas of the Philippines
- National Economic and Development Authority
