= DYEZ =

DYEZ may refer to the following radio stations and TV Station owned by MBC Media Group and ABS-CBN Corporation in the Philippines:

- DYEZ-AM, an AM radio station broadcasting in Bacolod, branded as Aksyon Radyo
- DYEZ-FM, an FM radio station broadcasting in Puerto Princesa, branded as Love Radio
- DYEZ-TV, a defunct television station in Kalibo, Aklan, and owned by ABS-CBN Corporation
