= DWCM =

DWCM is the callsign of the following broadcast stations in the Philippines.

- DWCM-AM, 1161 kHz (Aksyon Radyo), in Dagupan, Pangasinan, by Philippine Broadcasting Corporation
- DWCM-FM, 99.5 MHz (Love Radio), in Legazpi, Albay, by Pacific Broadcasting System
- DWCM-TV, VHF Ch. 11 (ABS-CBN), in Basco, Batanes, by ABS-CBN Corporation (defunct)
