= DYSM =

DYSM may refer to:

- DYSM-AM, an AM radio station broadcasting in Catarman, Northern Samar, branded as Aksyon Radyo
- DYSM-FM, an FM radio station broadcasting in Kalibo, branded as Love Radio
