= DWST (disambiguation) =

DWST may refer to these callsigns in the Philippines:

- DWST, a radio station in La Union under the brand 101.7 Love Radio
- DWST (1995–98), a defunct radio station in Metro Manila, now 101.1 Yes FM
- DWST-TV, a television station in Tuguegarao with the brand ABS-CBN Sports and Action
