= DZVM =

Yes FM Urdaneta (DZVM)
Urdaneta; Philippines
- Broadcast area: Eastern Pangasinan and surrounding areas
- Frequency: 104.1 MHz
- Branding: 104.1 Yes FM

Programming
- Languages: Pangasinense, Filipino
- Format: Contemporary MOR, OPM
- Network: Yes FM

Ownership
- Owner: MBC Media Group
- Operator: Star East Production & Marketing Services
- Sister stations: DWCM Aksyon Radyo, DZRH Dagupan, 98.3 Love Radio Dagupan, 106.3 Yes FM Dagupan

History
- First air date: 2006
- Former names: Radyo Natin (2006-2010)

Technical information
- Licensing authority: NTC
- Class: C, D, E
- Power: 1 kW
- ERP: 2.1 kW

Links
- Webcast: Listen Live
- Website: Yes The Best Urdaneta

104.1 Yes FM (DZVM 104.1 MHz) is an FM station owned by MBC Media Group and operated by Star East Production & Marketing Services. Its studios and transmitter are located at the 2nd Floor, Public Market, Brgy. Poblacion, Urdaneta, Pangasinan.
