= DWSR =

DWSR may refer to:

- DWSR-AM, an AM radio station broadcasting in Lucena
- DWSR-FM, an FM radio station broadcasting in Daet, branded as Power Radio
