= DXRO =

Radyo Natin Maramag (DXRO)
- Maramag; Philippines
- Broadcast area: Maramag and surrounding areas
- Frequency: 106.9 MHz
- Branding: 106.9 Radyo Natin

Programming
- Languages: Cebuano, Filipino
- Format: Community radio
- Network: Radyo Natin Network

Ownership
- Owner: MBC Media Group
- Operator: Gaudes Advertising Agency
- Sister stations: 106.3 Love Radio Malaybalay, 104.1 Yes FM Valencia

History
- First air date: 2007
- Call sign meaning: Radio

Technical information
- Licensing authority: NTC
- Power: 500 watts
- ERP: 1,000 watts

DXRO (106.9 FM), broadcasting as 106.9 Radyo Natin, is a radio station owned by MBC Media Group and operated by Gaudes Advertising Agency. Its studios and transmitter are located at Balansag Residence, Purok 6, Brgy. South Poblacion, Maramag.
