= DXFE-FM =

Radio station in Iligan, Philippines

Yes FM Iligan (DXFE)
- Iligan; Philippines
- Broadcast area: Lanao del Norte, parts of Lanao del Sur
- Frequency: 99.3 MHz
- Branding: 99.3 Yes FM

Programming
- Languages: Cebuano, Filipino
- Format: Contemporary MOR, OPM
- Network: Yes FM

Ownership
- Owner: MBC Media Group; (Pacific Broadcasting Systems)

History
- First air date: February 4, 2002 (Original); May 15, 2017 (Relaunch)
- Former call signs: DXTL (2002–2012)
- Former frequencies: 105.5 MHz (2002–2012)
- Call sign meaning: Fred Elizalde

Technical information
- Licensing authority: NTC
- Class: C, D and E
- Power: 10,000 watts
- ERP: 20,000 watts

Links
- Webcast: Listen Live
- Website: Yes The Best Iligan

DXFE (99.3 FM), broadcasting as 99.3 Yes FM, is a radio station owned and operated by MBC Media Group though its licensee, Pacific Broadcasting Systems. The station's studio and transmitter are located at the 4th Floor, BH Building, Sabayle St., Brgy. Saray, Iligan.

== History ==
Yes FM first went on air on February 4, 2002 on 105.5 MHz under the callsign DXTL. In 2012, it went off the air after a fire incident in the building it was in, damaging the station's equipment, transmitter and studio.

On May 15, 2017, following the launching of The New Face of YES!, the station returned on air as Yes The Best, this time on 99.3 MHz under the callsign DXFE. On February 5, 2024, it reverted back to Yes FM.
