= DYVL-AM =

Radio station in Tacloban, Philippines

Aksyon Radyo Tacloban (DYVL)
- Palo; Philippines
- Broadcast area: Northern Leyte, southern Samar
- Frequency: 819 kHz
- Branding: Aksyon Radyo 819

Programming
- Languages: Waray, Filipino
- Format: News, Public Affairs, Talk, Drama
- Network: Aksyon Radyo

Ownership
- Owner: Manila Broadcasting Company
- Sister stations: DZRH Tacloban, 91.1 Love Radio

History
- First air date: October 17, 1957
- Former names: Sunshine City (1973-1991); Radyo Balita (1991-1998)
- Call sign meaning: Voice of Leyte

Technical information
- Licensing authority: NTC
- Power: 10,000 watts

Links
- Webcast: DYVL Live Stream
- Website: DYVL-AM on Facebook

DYVL (819 AM) Aksyon Radyo is a radio station owned and operated by MBC Media Group. Its studio, offices and transmitter are located along PNP Rd. cor. Maharlika Highway, Brgy. Campetic, Palo, Leyte.

== History ==
DYVL was established on October 17, 1957 as a regional version of DZRH. In 1972, the station was one of the casualties of Martial Law, but went back on air after a year under the Sunshine City network. In 1978, DYVL transferred from 800 kHz to 819 kHz per GE75. By this time, it was located along Justice Romualdez St. cor. Real St. In 1991, the station was relaunched as Radyo Balita. In 1998, it was among the stations relaunched under MBC's regional Aksyon Radyo network.

In 2013, the station went off the air after its offices and transmitter in Brgy PHHC. Seaside, Tacloban were destroyed by Typhoon Yolanda, killing two of its reporters. In early 2014, it moved to its present home in Palo, Leyte, where it went back on the air.
