= DXIQ =

Radio station in Bukidnon, Philippines

Love Radio Malaybalay (DXIQ)
- Malaybalay; Philippines
- Broadcast area: Bukidnon
- Frequency: 106.3 MHz
- Branding: 106.3 Love Radio

Programming
- Languages: Cebuano, Filipino
- Format: Contemporary MOR, OPM
- Network: Love Radio

Ownership
- Owner: MBC Media Group
- Sister stations: 104.1 Yes FM Valencia

History
- First air date: September 24, 1995

Technical information
- Licensing authority: NTC
- Power: 5,000 watts
- ERP: 10,500 watts

Links
- Webcast: Listen Live
- Website: Love Radio Malaybalay

DXIQ (106.3 FM), broadcasting as 106.3 Love Radio, is a radio station owned and operated by MBC Media Group. Its studio, offices and transmitter are located at the 4th Floor, SG & G Bldg. Fortich St., Malaybalay. Established in 1995, it is the pioneer FM station (and the overall third radio station) in Malaybalay.
