= DYTH-AM =

Radio station in Tacloban, Philippines

DYTH
Relay of DZRH Manila
- Tacloban; Philippines
- Broadcast area: Northern Leyte, southern Samar
- Frequency: 990 kHz
- Branding: DZRH

Programming
- Language: Filipino
- Format: News, Public Affairs, Talk, Drama

Ownership
- Owner: MBC Media Group; (Pacific Broadcasting System)
- Sister stations: 91.1 Love Radio, DYVL Aksyon Radyo

History
- First air date: 1986
- Call sign meaning: Variant of DZRH, with T standing for "Tacloban"

Technical information
- Licensing authority: NTC
- Power: 10,000 watts

Links
- Website: dzrhnews.com.ph

DYTH (990 AM) is a relay station of DZRH, owned and operated by MBC Media Group through its licensee Pacific Broadcasting System. The station's transmitter is located along PNP Rd. cor. Maharlika Highway, Brgy. Campetic, Palo, Leyte, sharing transmitter tower with local Aksyon Radyo.
