= DXRY =

Radyo Natin San Francisco (DXRY)
- San Francisco; Philippines
- Broadcast area: Eastern Agusan del Sur
- Frequency: 104.9 MHz
- Branding: 104.9 Radyo Natin

Programming
- Languages: Cebuano, Filipino
- Format: Community radio
- Network: Radyo Natin

Ownership
- Owner: MBC Media Group

Technical information
- Licensing authority: NTC
- Power: 1,000 watts

DXRY (104.9 FM), broadcasting as 104.9 Radyo Natin, is a radio station owned and operated by MBC Media Group. Its studio is located at Purok 2B, Brgy. 1, San Francisco, Agusan del Sur.
