= DXWK =

Radio station in General Santos, Philippines

Love Radio General Santos (DXWK)
- General Santos; Philippines
- Broadcast area: South Cotabato, Sarangani and surrounding areas
- Frequency: 101.5 MHz
- Branding: 101.5 Love Radio

Programming
- Languages: Cebuano, Filipino
- Format: Pop MOR, OPM
- Network: Love Radio

Ownership
- Owner: MBC Media Group
- Sister stations: 94.3 DZRH News FM, DZRH General Santos

History
- First air date: January 1, 1990 (as K101)

Technical information
- Licensing authority: NTC
- Power: 10,000 watts

Links
- Webcast: Listen Live
- Website: Love Radio General Santos

DXWK (101.5 FM), broadcasting as 101.5 Love Radio, is a radio station owned and operated by MBC Media Group. Its studio and transmitter are located at DVO Bldg., Aparente St., Purok Malakas, Brgy. San Isidro, General Santos.

== Incident ==
On June 8, 2026, the station, alongside its sister station DZRH News FM, abruptly went off the air after RD Plaza Building in Brgy. Dadiangas West, where their studios are located, collapsed during the magnitude 7.8 earthquake, damaging both the station's studio and transmitter at the third floor.. On June 20, both stations went back on air from its new home in DVO Bldg. in Brgy. San Isidro.
