= DZNL =

Aksyon Radyo La Union (DZNL)
- San Fernando; Philippines
- Broadcast area: La Union and surrounding areas
- Frequency: 783 kHz
- Branding: DZNL Aksyon Radyo 783

Programming
- Languages: Ilocano, Filipino
- Format: News, Public Affairs, Talk
- Network: Aksyon Radyo

Ownership
- Owner: MBC Media Group; (Philippine Broadcasting Corporation)
- Operator: Montilla Multimedia Management and Marketing Services
- Sister stations: 101.7 Love Radio, Radyo Natin 106.7

History
- First air date: 1964 (as Radio Nalinac); 2002 (as Aksyon Radyo)
- Former names: Radio Nalinac
- Call sign meaning: Nalinac family (former owner)

Technical information
- Licensing authority: NTC
- Power: 5,000 watts

DZNL (783 AM) Aksyon Radyo is a radio station owned by MBC Media Group through its licensee Philippine Broadcasting Corporation and operated by Montilla Multimedia Management and Marketing Services. The station's studio and transmitter are located along National Highway, Brgy. Pagdalagan Norte, San Fernando, La Union.

Established in 1964, DZNL is the pioneer AM station in La Union. It was formerly known as Radio Nalinac owned by the Zandueta Family. At that time, it was formerly affiliated with the Radio Mindanao Network. In the early 1980s, it was sold to Manila Broadcasting Company.
