= DXWH =

Radio station in Davao de Oro, Philippines

Radyo Natin Nabunturan
- Nabunturan; Philippines
- Broadcast area: Davao de Oro, parts of Davao del Norte
- Frequency: 104.7 MHz
- Branding: 104.7 Radyo Natin - Radyo De Oro

Programming
- Languages: Cebuano, Filipino
- Format: Community radio
- Network: Radyo Natin Network

Ownership
- Owner: MBC Media Group; (Pacific Broadcasting System)
- Operator: AJT Production and Media Services & Amapola Broadcasting System

History
- First air date: February 2018

Technical information
- Licensing authority: NTC
- Power: 1 kW

104.7 Radyo Natin - Radyo De Oro (DXWH 104.7 MHz) is an FM station owned by MBC Media Group and operated by AJT Production and Media Services & Amapola Broadcasting System. Its studios and transmitter are located at Rooftop Junora Bldg., Purok 7, Brgy. Poblacion, Nabunturan.
