= DWYN =

Radio station in Naga, Camarines Sur, Philippines

Love Radio Naga (DWYN)
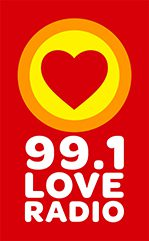
- Naga; Philippines
- Broadcast area: Camarines Sur and surrounding areas
- Frequency: 99.1 MHz
- RDS: LOVE991
- Branding: 99.1 Love Radio

Programming
- Languages: Bicolano, Filipino
- Format: Contemporary MOR, OPM
- Network: Love Radio

Ownership
- Owner: MBC Media Group
- Sister stations: DZRH Naga, 89.5 Radyo Natin FM

History
- First air date: December 3, 1991

Technical information
- Licensing authority: NTC
- Class: C, D, E
- Power: 10,000 watts
- ERP: 20,000 watts

Links
- Webcast: Listen Live
- Website: Love Radio Naga

DWYN (99.1 FM), broadcasting as 99.1 Love Radio, is a radio station owned and operated by MBC Media Group. Its studio and transmitter are located at Door #2, 2nd Floor, Ed Venture Bldg., AMS Compound, Peñafrancia Ave., Naga, Camarines Sur.
