= DWIS =

Radyo Natin Agoo (DWIS)
Agoo; Philippines
- Broadcast area: Southern La Union
- Frequency: 106.7 MHz
- Branding: Radyo Natin 106.7

Programming
- Languages: Ilocano, Filipino
- Format: Community radio
- Network: Radyo Natin Network

Ownership
- Owner: MBC Media Group
- Sister stations: Aksyon Radyo 783, 101.7 Love Radio

History
- First air date: 2002
- Former names: Hot FM (2002–2017)

Technical information
- Licensing authority: NTC
- Power: 1,000 watts

DWIS (106.7 FM), broadcasting as Radyo Natin 106.7, is a radio station owned and operated by MBC Media Group. Its studios are located along T. Asper St., Agoo.
