= DZTR =

Radio station in Naga, Camarines Sur, Philippines

Radyo Natin Naga (DZTR)
- Naga; Philippines
- Broadcast area: Camarines Sur and surrounding areas
- Frequency: 89.5 MHz
- RDS: RDYONTN
- Branding: 89.5 Radyo Natin

Programming
- Languages: Bicolano, Filipino
- Format: Community radio
- Network: Radyo Natin

Ownership
- Owner: MBC Media Group; (Cebu Broadcasting Company)
- Sister stations: 99.1 Love Radio, DZRH Naga

History
- First air date: 1998
- Former names: Yes FM (1998–2005); The Beat (2005–2014)
- Call sign meaning: None; sequentially assigned

Technical information
- Licensing authority: NTC
- Power: 5,000 watts
- ERP: 20,000 watts

Links
- Webcast: Listen Live

DZTR (89.5 FM), broadcasting as 89.5 Radyo Natin, is a radio station owned and operated by MBC Media Group through its licensee Cebu Broadcasting Company. The station's studio is located at the 3rd Floor, Naga City Market, Naga, Camarines Sur.

== History ==
The station was inaugurated in 1998 as Yes FM. In 2005, Ateneo de Naga University took over the station's operations and rebranded it as The Beat FM. It aired a College Radio format until it went off the air in 2009. On January 4, 2010, it was relaunched with a mainstream Top 40 format. During that time, its studios were located at the Phelan Bldg., Ateneo de Naga University. In 2014, it went off the air due to technical difficulties. In 2016, it became part of the Radyo Natin Network and is currently one of the few O&O stations in the network.
