= DYMY =

Radio station in Bacolod, Philippines

Easy Rock Bacolod (DYMY)
- Bacolod; Philippines
- Broadcast area: Northern Negros Occidental and surrounding areas
- Frequency: 105.5 MHz
- Branding: 105.5 Easy Rock

Programming
- Languages: English, Hiligaynon, Filipino
- Format: Soft AC
- Network: Easy Rock

Ownership
- Owner: MBC Media Group; (Cebu Broadcasting Company)
- Operator: Muñoz Broadcasting Concepts
- Sister stations: DYEZ Aksyon Radyo, DZRH Bacolod, 91.9 Love Radio

History
- First air date: 1995
- Former call signs: DYTS (1995–2009)
- Former names: Showbiz Tsismis (1995-2000); Yes FM (2000-2009)

Technical information
- Licensing authority: NTC
- Class: C, D
- Power: 10,000 watt

Links
- Webcast: Listen Live
- Website: Easy Rock Bacolod

DYMY (105.5 FM), broadcasting as 105.5 Easy Rock, is a radio station owned by MBC Media Group through its licensee Cebu Broadcasting Company and operated by Muñoz Broadcasting Concepts. The station's studio and transmitter are located at the 2nd floor, RML Bldg., Burgos St., Bacolod.

== History ==
The station was inaugurated in 1995 as a relay station of Manila-based Showbiz Tsismis under the call letters DYTS. In 2000, it rebranded as Yes FM and adopted a mass-based format. On July 1, 2009, it rebranded as 105.5 Easy Rock and switched to a Soft AC format.
