= DYEZ-AM =

Radio station in Bacolod, Philippines

Aksyon Radyo Bacolod (DYEZ)
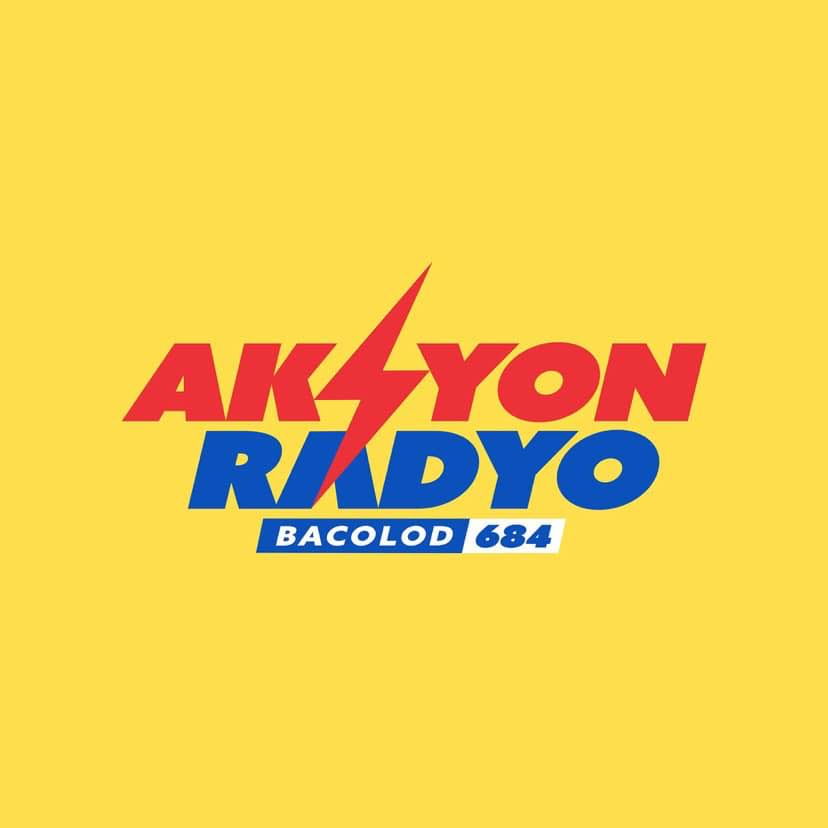
- Bacolod; Philippines
- Broadcast area: Northern Negros Occidental and surrounding areas
- Frequency: 684 kHz
- Branding: DYEZ Aksyon Radyo

Programming
- Languages: Hiligaynon, Filipino
- Format: News, Public Affairs, Talk, Drama
- Network: Aksyon Radyo

Ownership
- Owner: MBC Media Group
- Sister stations: DZRH Bacolod, 91.9 Love Radio, 105.5 Easy Rock

History
- First air date: August 17, 1969
- Former call signs: DYEN (1969–1972)
- Former names: Sunshine City; Radyo Balita; Radyo Owang
- Former frequencies: 690 kHz (1969–1978)

Technical information
- Licensing authority: NTC
- Power: 10,000 watts
- ERP: 20,000 watts

Links
- Webcast: Listen and Watch Live (via Facebook Live, Selected programs only)
- Website: Aksyon Radyo Bacolod

DYEZ (684 AM) Aksyon Radyo is a radio station owned and operated by MBC Media Group. Its studio and offices are located at the 4th floor, Wilrose Bldg., Locsin St. cor. Burgos St., Barangay 9, Bacolod, while its transmitter is located in Brgy. Taloc, Bago, Negros Occidental (sharing tower site with local DZRH relay station DYBH).

== Broadcasting history ==
DYEZ was established in 1969 in the administrative building of the then Elizalde-owned Central Azucarera De La Carlota in La Carlota. It initially carried the call sign of DYEN. The station hosted some of the pioneer broadcasters in the province.

In 1972, it was among the stations that closed down upon the declaration of Martial Law. Several years later, it resumed operations as DYEZ and became the dominant news and music station. This was known at that time as DYEZ Sunshine City, the localized version of Manila's DWIZ (now owned by Aliw Broadcasting Corporation) used at that time as Sunshine City.

By the 1980s, DYEZ shifted its programming to full-time news and public affairs. In 1991, following the end of DWIZ and Sunshine City branding, it changed their name to Radyo Balita. In 1994, it renamed once more to Radyo Owang along with Ilo-ilo station.

By 1999, with the launch of Aksyon Radyo Davao, DYEZ utilized the current branding called Aksyon Radyo.

In 2009, Aksyon Radyo Bacolod celebrated its 40th Anniversary.

In 2011, Aksyon Radyo Bacolod celebrated its 42nd Anniversary by way of a free medical and dental mission which benefitted nearly 300 patients.

Recently, Aksyon Radyo Bacolod capped the year 2011 with another project by its civic arm "Operation Tulong Task Force" when it turned over to the Social Action Center of the Diocese of Bacolod more than 200 boxes of used clothes and food stuff for the victims of Tropical Storm “Sendong".

In 2014, Aksyon Radyo Bacolod celebrated its 45th Anniversary.

In 2019, Aksyon Radyo Bacolod celebrated its 50th Golden Anniversary.

In 2024, Aksyon Radyo Bacolod celebrated its 55th Anniversary.

== Recognitions and awards ==
- Kapisanan ng mga Brodkaster ng Pilipinas (2026) 29th KBP Golden Dove Awards BEST AM STATION-Provincial
- Kapisanan ng mga Brodkaster ng Pilipinas (2017) 25th KBP Golden Dove Awards BEST AM STATION-Provincial
- Kapisanan ng mga Brodkasters sa Pilipinas Golden Dove Nominee (2013) for best variety program for radio - provincial category for "Aksyon Jamboree"
- Kapisanan ng mga Brodkasters sa Pilipinas Golden Dove Nominee (2013) for Best Public Affairs Program-provincial category for its Year End Report Radio Documentary "Sa Tuig sang Kalayo"
- Kapisanan ng mga Brodkasters sa Pilipinas Golden Dove Awardee (2013) for Best AM Station Provincial Category
- Kapisanan ng mga Brodkasters sa Pilipinas Golden Dove Nominee (2012) for best AM station provincial category
- Kapisanan ng mga Brodkasters sa Pilipinas Golden Dove Nominee (2011) for best AM station provincial category
- Kapisanan ng mga Brodkasters sa Pilipinas Golden Dove Nominee (2011) for Best Public Affairs Program-provincial category for its Year End Report Radio Documentary "Crossroads"
- Golden Dove Awardee (2006) – best public affairs program – “Aksyon Hotline - anchored by Station Manager JJ Deocampo"
- Golden Dove Awardee (2004) “Puerti Nga Abiliti”, for best radio comedy.
