= DYSM-AM =

Aksyon Radyo Catarman (DYSM)
- Catarman; Philippines
- Broadcast area: Northern Samar
- Frequency: 972 kHz
- Branding: Aksyon Radyo 972

Programming
- Languages: Waray, Filipino
- Format: News, Public Affairs, Talk
- Network: Aksyon Radyo

Ownership
- Owner: MBC Media Group; (Cebu Broadcasting Company)
- Sister stations: 94.1 Love Radio

History
- First air date: 1998
- Call sign meaning: Samar

Technical information
- Licensing authority: NTC
- Power: 1,000 watts

DYSM (972 AM) Aksyon Radyo is a radio station owned and operated by MBC Media Group through its licensee Cebu Broadcasting Company. The station's studio is located at #102 National Highway, Brgy. Cawayan, Catarman, Northern Samar.

On December 17, 2015, DYSM's transmitter was knocked down by Typhoon Melor (Nona).
