= DXGH =

Radio station in General Santos, Philippines

Relay of DZRH Manila
- General Santos; Philippines
- Broadcast area: Soccsksargen and surrounding areas
- Frequency: 531 kHz
- Branding: DZRH

Programming
- Language: Filipino
- Format: News, Public Affairs, Talk, Drama

Ownership
- Owner: MBC Media Group; (Pacific Broadcasting System)
- Sister stations: 94.3 DZRH News FM, 101.5 Love Radio

History
- First air date: 1993
- Call sign meaning: Variant of DZRH, with G standing for "General Santos"

Technical information
- Licensing authority: NTC
- Power: 10 kW

Links
- Website: dzrhnews.com.ph

DXGH (531 AM) is a relay station of DZRH, owned and operated by MBC Media Group through its licensee Pacific Broadcasting System. The station's transmitter is located at Barangay San Isidro, General Santos.
