= DYPH-AM =

Radio station in Puerto Princesa, Philippines

DYPH
Relay of DZRH Manila
- Puerto Princesa; Philippines
- Broadcast area: Palawan
- Frequency: 693 kHz
- Branding: DZRH

Programming
- Language: Filipino
- Format: News, Public Affairs, Talk, Drama

Ownership
- Owner: MBC Media Group
- Sister stations: 98.3 Love Radio

History
- First air date: 1990
- Call sign meaning: Variant of DZRH, with P standing for "Palawan"

Technical information
- Licensing authority: NTC
- Power: 10 kW

Links
- Website: dzrhnews.com.ph

DYPH (693 AM) is a relay station of DZRH, owned and operated by MBC Media Group. Its transmitter is located at MBC Palawan Broadcast Resources, 4th Floor Ascendo Suite, Malvar Street, Brgy. Mandaragat, Puerto Princesa.
