= DWST =

Radio station in La Union, Philippines

Love Radio La Union (DWST)
- San Fernando; Philippines
- Broadcast area: La Union and surrounding areas
- Frequency: 101.7 MHz
- Branding: 101.7 Love Radio

Programming
- Languages: Ilocano, Filipino
- Format: Contemporary MOR, OPM
- Network: Love Radio

Ownership
- Owner: MBC Media Group
- Sister stations: Aksyon Radyo 783, Radyo Natin 106.7

History
- First air date: February 1, 1988
- Call sign meaning: "Parked" from the current DWYS in Manila

Technical information
- Licensing authority: NTC
- Power: 1,000 watts
- ERP: 2,100 watts

Links
- Webcast: Listen Live
- Website: Love Radio La Union

DWST (101.7 FM), broadcasting as 101.7 Love Radio, is a radio station owned and operated by MBC Media Group. The station's studio and transmitter are located at the 4/F Landbank Bldg., Quezon Ave., San Fernando, La Union.
