= DXTS =

Radio station in General Santos, Philippines

DZRH News FM (DXTS)
- General Santos; Philippines
- Broadcast area: South Cotabato, Sarangani and surrounding areas
- Frequency: 94.3 MHz
- Branding: 94.3 DZRH News FM

Programming
- Languages: Cebuano, Filipino, English
- Format: Pop MOR, News, Talk
- Affiliations: DZRH

Ownership
- Owner: MBC Media Group; (Cebu Broadcasting Company)
- Sister stations: DZRH General Santos, 101.5 Love Radio

History
- First air date: January 1, 1999
- Former names: Hot FM (January 1, 1999-May 31, 2009); Easy Rock (July 1, 2009-February 23, 2014); Yes FM/Yes The Best (February 24, 2014-August 2019)

Technical information
- Licensing authority: NTC
- Power: 10,000 watts

Links
- Website: https://www.dzrhnewsfm.com/

DXTS (94.3 FM), broadcasting as 94.3 DZRH News FM, is a radio station owned and operated by MBC Media Group through its licensee, Cebu Broadcasting Company. Its studio and transmitter are located in DVO Bldg., Aparente St., Purok Malakas, Brgy. San Isidro, General Santos.

Despite carrying the DZRH brand, it usually airs its own programming. It is the second FM station of MBC to carry a hybrid of music & news after Ben FM in Northern Cebu.

== History ==
The station first went on air on January 1, 1999 as Hot FM. It carried a mass-based format. In May 2009, it went off the air. In July 2009, it was relaunched as Easy Rock with a Soft adult contemporary format. In February 2014, the station, along with MBC's O&O Hot FM stations, rebranded as Yes FM, reverting to its mass-based format. In September 2019, it was reformatted into a music and news/talk format, this time using the DZRH branding.

On June 8, 2026, the station, alongside its sister station Love Radio, abruptly went off the air after RD Plaza Building in Brgy. Dadiangas West, where their studios are located, collapsed during the magnitude 7.8 earthquake, damaging both the station's studio and transmitter at the third floor. On June 20, both stations went back on air from its new home in DVO Bldg. in Brgy. San Isidro.
