= DYKS-FM =

Radio station in Bacolod, Philippines

Love Radio Bacolod (DYKS)
- Bacolod; Philippines
- Broadcast area: Northern Negros Occidental and surrounding areas
- Frequency: 91.9 MHz (HD Radio)
- Branding: 91.9 Love Radio

Programming
- Languages: Hiligaynon, Filipino
- Format: Contemporary MOR, OPM
- Network: Love Radio

Ownership
- Owner: MBC Media Group
- Operator: FMUÑOZ Media Talents and Management OPC
- Sister stations: DZRH Bacolod, DYEZ Aksyon Radyo, 105.5 Easy Rock

History
- First air date: October 1, 1991
- Call sign meaning: Kiss (former branding)

Technical information
- Licensing authority: NTC
- Class: C, D, E
- Power: 10,000 watts
- ERP: 20,000 watts

Links
- Webcast: Listen Live
- Website: Love Radio Bacolod

DYKS (91.9 FM), broadcasting as 91.9 Love Radio, is a radio station owned by MBC Media Group and operated by FMUÑOZ Media Talents and Management OPC. The station's studio and transmitter are located at the 4th Floor, Wilrose Bldg., Burgos-Locsin St., Barangay 9, Bacolod.
