= DWSR-AM =

DWSR
Relay of DZRH Manila
- Lucena; Philippines
- Broadcast area: Quezon, Laguna and surrounding areas
- Frequency: 1224 kHz
- Branding: DZRH

Programming
- Language: Filipino
- Format: News, Public Affairs, Talk, Drama

Ownership
- Owner: MBC Media Group
- Sister stations: 100.7 Love Radio

History
- First air date: 1989

Technical information
- Licensing authority: NTC
- Power: 10,000 watts

Links
- Website: dzrhnews.com.ph

DWSR (1224 AM) is a relay station of DZRH, owned and operated by MBC Media Group. The station's transmitter is located along Hermana Fausta St. cor. Enriquez St., Lucena.
