= DWCM-FM =

Radio station in Legazpi, Philippines

Love Radio Legazpi (DWCM)
- Legazpi; Philippines
- Broadcast area: Albay and surrounding areas
- Frequency: 99.5 MHz
- Branding: 99.5 Love Radio

Programming
- Languages: Albayanon, Filipino
- Format: Contemporary MOR, OPM
- Network: Love Radio

Ownership
- Owner: MBC Media Group; (Pacific Broadcasting System)

History
- First air date: July 3, 1989
- Call sign meaning: None; sequentially assigned

Technical information
- Licensing authority: NTC
- Power: 10,000 watts
- ERP: 30,000 watts

Links
- Webcast: Listen Live
- Website: Love Radio Legazpi

DWCM (99.5 FM), broadcasting as 99.5 Love Radio, is a radio station owned and operated by MBC Media Group through its licensee Pacific Broadcasting System. Its studio and transmitter are located at the 3rd Floor, Morante Bldg., Rizal St., Imperial Court Subd. Phase 2, Legazpi, Albay.
