= DWID =

Radio station in Dagupan, Philippines

Love Radio Dagupan (DWID)
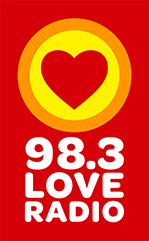

Dagupan; Philippines
- Broadcast area: Pangasinan and surrounding areas
- Frequency: 98.3 MHz
- Branding: 98.3 Love Radio

Programming
- Languages: Pangasinense, Filipino
- Format: Contemporary MOR, OPM
- Network: Love Radio

Ownership
- Owner: MBC Media Group
- Sister stations: DWCM Aksyon Radyo, DZRH Dagupan, 106.3 Yes FM

History
- First air date: February 14, 1988

Technical information
- Licensing authority: NTC
- Class: C, D, E
- Power: 10,000 watts
- ERP: 21,000 watts

Links
- Webcast: Listen Live
- Website: Love Radio Dagupan

DWID (98.3 FM), broadcasting as 98.3 Love Radio, is a radio station owned and operated by MBC Media Group. The station's studio and transmitter are located at the 3rd floor, Carried Realty Corporate Lumber Bldg., M.H. del Pilar St., Dagupan.
