= DYEZ-FM =

Radio station in Puerto Princesa, Philippines

Love Radio Palawan (DYEZ)
- Puerto Princesa; Philippines
- Broadcast area: Palawan
- Frequency: 98.3 MHz
- Branding: 98.3 Love Radio

Programming
- Language: Filipino
- Format: Contemporary MOR, OPM
- Network: Love Radio

Ownership
- Owner: MBC Media Group
- Sister stations: DZRH Puerto Princesa

History
- First air date: February 14, 1995

Technical information
- Licensing authority: NTC
- Class: CDE
- Power: 10,000 watts

Links
- Webcast: Listen Live
- Website: Love Radio Palawan

DYEZ (98.3 FM), broadcasting as 98.3 Love Radio, is a radio station owned and operated by MBC Media Group. Its studio, offices and transmitter are located at MBC Palawan Broadcast Resources, 4th Floor Ascendo Suite, Malvar Street, Brgy. Mandaragat, Puerto Princesa.
