= DWCM-AM =

Radio station in Dagupan, Philippines

Aksyon Radyo Pangasinan (DWCM)
- Dagupan; Philippines
- Broadcast area: Pangasinan and surrounding areas
- Frequency: 1161 kHz
- Branding: Aksyon Radyo 1161

Programming
- Languages: Pangasinense, Filipino
- Format: News, Public Affairs, Talk
- Network: Aksyon Radyo

Ownership
- Owner: MBC Media Group; (Philippine Broadcasting Corporation)
- Operator: Balon Subol Broadcast Marketing Corporation
- Sister stations: DZRH Dagupan, 98.3 Love Radio, 106.3 Yes FM

History
- First air date: June 20, 2006
- Call sign meaning: Inverted as Manila Broadcasting Company

Technical information
- Licensing authority: NTC
- Power: 10,000 watts

DWCM (1161 AM) Aksyon Radyo is a radio station owned by MBC Media Group through its licensee Philippine Broadcasting Corporation and operated by Balon Subol Broadcast Marketing Corporation. The station's studio is located at the 2nd floor, Duque Bldg., Galvan St., Brgy. II, Dagupan, and its transmitter is located at Brgy. Lucao, Dagupan.
