= List of radio stations in Cebu =

Below is a list of radio stations in Cebu, whose coverage is in part or whole of the same.

== Metro Cebu ==
=== AM Stations ===
Frequency	Name	Company/Owner	Format	Callsign	Power	Location
540 kHz	Radyo Pilipino Cebu	Radio Audience Developers Integrated Organization (RADIO), Inc. (operated by Radyo Pilipino Corporation)	News, Public Affairs, Talk	DYRB	10 kW	Cebu City
576 kHz	Radyo Pilipinas Cebu	Presidential Broadcast Service	News, Public Affairs, Talk, Government Radio	DYMR	10 kW	Cebu City
612 kHz	RMN Cebu	Radio Mindanao Network, Inc.	News, Public Affairs, Talk, Drama	DYHP	10 kW	Cebu City
648 kHz	Aksyon Radyo Cebu	Manila Broadcasting Company	News, Public Affairs, Talk	DYRC	10 kW	Cebu City
675 kHz	Radyo Ronda Cebu	Radio Philippines Network, Inc.	News, Public Affairs, Talk, Drama	DYKC	10 kW	Mandaue
864 kHz	Radyo SIAM Cebu	Sarraga Integrated and Management Corporation	News, Public Affairs, Talk	DYDD	10 kW	Cebu City
909 kHz	DYLA 909	Vimcontu Broadcasting Corporation	News, Public Affairs, Talk	DYLA	10 kW	Cebu City
963 kHz	Bombo Radyo Cebu	People's Broadcasting Service, Inc. (operated by Bombo Radyo Philippines)	News, Public Affairs, Talk, Drama	DYMF	10 kW	Cebu City
999 kHz	Super Radyo Cebu	GMA Network, Inc.	News, Public Affairs, Talk, Drama	DYSS	10 kW	Cebu City
1152 kHz	DYCM.DotTV	Masbate Community Broadcasting Company (operated by Makati Broadcasting Company)	News, Public Affairs, Talk	DYCM	10 kW (Note: Transmitter location in Tayud, Consolacion.)	Cebu City
1215 kHz	Radio Fuerza	Word Broadcasting Corporation	News, Public Affairs, Talk, Religious Radio	DYRF	10 kW	Cebu City
1305 kHz	Radyo Agila Cebu	Eagle Broadcasting Corporation	News, Public Affairs, Talk, Religious (Iglesia ni Cristo)	DYFX	10 kW	Talisay
1395 kHz	DZRH Cebu (Note: Relay station of DZRH 666 DZRH Manila.)	Cebu Broadcasting Company (operated by Manila Broadcasting Company)	News, Public Affairs, Talk, Drama	DYXR	1 kW	Cebu City

=== FM Stations ===
Frequency	Name	RDS ID	Company/Owner	Format	Callsign	Power
88.3 MHz	XFM Cebu	XFM CEBU; 88.3 XFM CEBU	Southern Broadcasting Network, Inc. (operated by Y2H Broadcasting Network, Inc.)	Contemporary MOR, News, Talk	DYAP	10 kW
89.1 MHz	Juander Radyo Cebu	89.1 JUANDER RADYO	Word Broadcasting Corporation (operated by RSV Broadcasting Network)	Contemporary MOR, News, Talk	DYDW	20 kW
89.9 MHz	MemoRieS FM Cebu	MemoRieS; DYKI-FM-PRIME BROADCASTING	Primax Broadcasting Network, Inc.	Classic Hits, OPM	DYKI	10 kW
90.7 MHz	Brigada News FM Cebu	BRIGADA; In The Heart of Changing Lives	Mareco Broadcasting Network, Inc. (operated by Brigada Mass Media Corporation)	Contemporary MOR, News, Talk	DYAC	20 kW
91.5 MHz	Yes FM Cebu	—N/a	Cebu Broadcasting Company (operated by Manila Broadcasting Company)	Contemporary MOR, OPM	DYHR	25 kW
92.3 MHz	Solid FM Cebu	1. SOLID FM 2. CEBU 3. CITY; SOLID FM CEBU CITY	Quest Broadcasting, Inc. (operated by Y2H Broadcasting Network, Inc.)	Soft AC	DYBN	10 kW
93.1 MHz	FMR Cebu	FMR 93.1; Favorite Music Radio Philippines	Vimcontu Broadcasting Corporation (operated by Philippine Collective Media Corporation)	Contemporary MOR, News, Talk	DYWF	10 kW
93.9 MHz	iFM Cebu	—N/a	Radio Mindanao Network, Inc.	Contemporary MOR, OPM, News	DYXL	10 kW
94.7 MHz	Energy FM Cebu	ENERGYFM	Ultrasonic Broadcasting System, Inc.	Contemporary MOR, OPM	DYLL	20 kW
95.5 MHz	Star FM Cebu	It's All; For You	People's Broadcasting Service, Inc. (operated by Bombo Radyo Philippines)	Contemporary MOR, OPM, News	DYMX	25 kW
96.3 MHz	WRocK	WRocK	Exodus Broadcasting Company	Soft AC, OPM	DYRK	10 kW
97.9 MHz	Love Radio Cebu	—N/a	Manila Broadcasting Company	Contemporary MOR, OPM	DYBU	25 kW
98.7 MHz	UP 987	UP987	Far East Broadcasting Company	CCM, Religious Radio, Christian Pop	DYFR	10 kW
99.5 MHz	Barangay LS Cebu		GMA Network, Inc.	Contemporary MOR, OPM	DYRT	25 kW
100.3 MHz	RJFM Cebu (Note: Relay station of DZRJ 100.3 RJFM Manila.)	RJFMCebu	Free Air Broadcasting Network, Inc.	Adult Hits	DYRJ	20 kW
101.1 MHz	Y101	Y101 Cebu	GVM Radio/TV Corporation (operated by Y2H Broadcasting Network, Inc.)	Top 40 (CHR), OPM	DYIO	25 kW
101.9 MHz	True FM Cebu (Note: Semi-satellite station of DWLA 105.9 True FM Manila.)	—N/a	Nation Broadcasting Corporation (operated by TV5 Network, Inc.)	News, Public Affairs, Talk	DYFM	20 kW
102.7 MHz	Easy Rock Cebu	—N/a	Pacific Broadcasting System, Inc. (operated by Manila Broadcasting Company)	Soft AC	DYES	25 kW
103.5 MHz	Retro Cebu	—N/a	University of Mindanao Broadcasting Network, Inc.	Classic Hits, OPM	DYCD	10 kW
105.1 MHz	TMC		Ultimate Entertainment, Inc. (operated by Tops Media Cebu Corporation)	Vispop	DYUR	15 kW
105.9 MHz	Monster BT 105.9	—N/a	Audiovisual Communicators, Inc.	Top 40 (CHR), OPM	DYBT	10 kW
106.7 MHz	Home Radio Cebu		Aliw Broadcasting Corporation	Soft AC	DYQC	25 kW
107.5 MHz	Win Radio Cebu	BIGRadio	Mabuhay Broadcasting System, Inc. (operated by ZimZam Management, Inc.)	Contemporary MOR, OPM	DYNU	10 kW

==== Carcar City ====
Frequency	Name	RDS ID	Company/Owner	Format	Callsign	Power
88.1 MHz	La Solid FM Carcar	—N/a	—N/a	Religious Radio	—N/a	2.5 kW
95.9 MHz	Smile Radio Carcar	—N/a	—N/a	Religious Radio	—N/a	1 kW
96.9 MHz	AFM Carcar	—N/a	—N/a	Religious Radio Classic Hits	—N/a	3 kW
98.5 MHz	HOT FM Carcar	—N/a	Soundstream Broadcasting Corporation	Contemporary MOR, News, talk	—N/a	1 kW
102.9 MHz	South Radio News FM Carcar	—N/a	Allied Broadcasting Center	Contemporary MOR, News, talk	DYMN	5 kW
89.5 MHZ.	Radio Mama Mary		Sanctuary Castle Oratory Broadcasting Network	Marians Songs		1 KW

== Toledo City ==
=== FM Stations ===
Frequency	Name	Company	Format	Callsign	Power	Location	RDS ID
87.5 MHz	Easy Radio Toledo	Capitol Broadcasting Center	Contemporary MOR, News, Talk	—N/a	1 kW	Toledo	—N/a
88.5 MHz	Brigada News FM Toledo	Baycomms Broadcasting Corporation (operated by Brigada Mass Media Corporation)	Contemporary MOR, News, Talk	DYBD	1 kW	Toledo	BRIGADA "In The Heart of changing Lives"
89.7 MHz	K5 News FM Toledo	Subic Broadcasting Corporation (operated by 5K Broadcasting Network)	Contemporary MOR, News, Talk	—N/a	5 kW	Toledo	K5NEWSFM
92.5 MHz	Energy FM Toledo	Ultrasonic Broadcasting System, Inc.	Contemporary MOR	DYTD	1 kW	Toledo	ENERGYFM
97.7 MHz	Magnet Chance FM Toledo	—N/a	Contemporary MOR, News, Talk	—N/a	5 kW	Toledo	—N/a
99.9 MHz	Shine Radio Toledo	—N/a	Contemporary MOR, News, Talk	—N/a	1 kW	Toledo	—N/a
102.5 MHz	Tribal Radio Toledo	Tribal Radio Philippines	Contemporary MOR, News, Talk	—N/a	500 W	Toledo	—N/a
103.1 MHz	Juander Radyo Toledo	Negros Broadcasting & Publishing Corporation (operated by RSV Broadcasting Network)	Contemporary MOR, News, Talk	DYMT	5 kW	Toledo	103.1 JUANDER RADYO
104.3 MHz	Summit FM Toledo	—N/a	Contemporary MOR, News, Talk	—N/a	1 kW	Toledo	—N/a
106.3 MHz	Hope Radio Toledo	Digital Broadcasting Corporation	Religious programming (Seventh-day Adventist Church)	DYAM	1 kW	Toledo	—N/a
107.1 MHz	Real Radio Toledo	PEC Broadcasting Corporation	Contemporary MOR, Community radio	DYPE	1 kW	Toledo	—N/a
107.9 MHz	MRGV Prime FM Toledo	Prime Broadcasting Network	Contemporary MOR, News, Talk	DYDT	1 kW	Toledo	—N/a

== Bogo City ==
=== AM Stations ===
Frequency	Name	Company	Format	Callsign	Power
1260 kHz	Radyo SIAM Bogo (Note: Relay station of DYDD 1260 Radyo SIAM Cebu.)	Sarraga Intg. & Mgmt. Corp.	News, Public affairs, Talk	DYHH	10 kW

=== FM Stations ===
Frequency	Name	Company	Format	Callsign	Power	Location	RDS ID
90.9 MHz	Brigada News FM Bogo	Baycomms Broadcasting Corporation (operated by Brigada Mass Media Corporation)	Contemporary MOR, News, Talk	DYMM	5 kW	Bogo	BRIGADA "In The Heart of changing Lives"
93.3 MHz	Hug Radio Bogo	Vimcontu Broadcasting Corporation	Contemporary MOR	DYJS	5 kW	Bogo	—N/a
94.1 MHz	Juander Radyo Bogo	Negros Broadcasting & Publishing Corporation (operated by RSV Broadcasting Network)	Contemporary MOR, News,Talk	DYVL	5 kW	Bogo	JUANDERRADYO
97.3 MHz	Radyo Bisdak Bogo	Times Broadcasting Network Corporation	Music, News	—N/a	1 kW	Bogo	—N/a
100.5 MHz	DYCM.DotTV Bogo (Note: Relay station of DYCM 1152 DYCM.DotTV Cebu.)	Makati Broadcasting Company	News, Public affairs, Religious	DYCM	5 kW	Bogo	—N/a

== Cebu Province ==
=== FM Stations ===
Frequency	Name	Company	Format	Callsign	Power	Location
88.9 MHz	Lucky Radio Tuburan	—N/a	Community Radio, Religious Radio	DYTJ	1 kW	Tuburan
89.5 MHz	Radyo Mama Mary	Sanctuary Castle Oratory Broadcasting Network	religious radio, Marian Song	—N/a	1 kW	Sibonga
89.7 MHz	JJS Internet Radio	JJS Electronics Parts and Services (operated by Amapola Broadcasting System & RSV Broadcasting Network Incorporated)	Contemporary MOR, Talk	—N/a	1 kW	Moalboal
90.1 MHz	Radyo One Cebu	Soundstream Broadcasting Corporation	Contemporary MOR, News, Talk	DYGG	5 kW	Balamban
90.9 MHz	Badian Campus Bee Radio	—N/a	Contemporary MOR, News, Talk	—N/a	1 kW	Badian
91.3 MHz	Energy FM Balamban	Ultrasonic Broadcasting System	Contemporary MOR, News, Talk	DYHC	5 kW	Balamban
91.3 MHz	Ka-Alegre FM	—N/a	Contemporary MOR, News, Talk	—N/a	1 kW	Alegria
91.7 MHz	Ben FM Medellin	MBC Media Group	Contemporary MOR, Community radio	DYBG	5 kW	Medellin
93.2 MHz	Riverside FM Ginatilan	—N/a	Community Radio	—N/a	1 kW	Ginatilan
93.3 MHz	MRGV Prime FM Argao	Prime Broadcasting Network	Contemporary MOR, News, Talk	—N/a	1 kW	Argao
94.9 MHz	Radyo Natin Balamban	MBC Media Group	Contemporary MOR, Community radio	DYRL	1 kW	Balamban
95.3 MHz	One Heart Radio Samboan	Soundstream Broadcasting Corporation	Contemporary MOR, Talk	DYST	1 kW	Samboan
95.3 MHz	Barangay Home Radio Dumanjug	—N/a	Community Radio	—N/a	1 kW	Dumanjug
95.3 MHz	Eyes Radio Pinamungajan	—N/a	Community Radio	—N/a	1 kW	Pinamungajan
97.8 MHz	Bread Radio Dumanjug	—N/a	Contemporary MOR, News, Talk	—N/a	1 kW	Dumanjug
98.1 MHz	BT Radio Tuburan	Philippine Broadcasting Service	Contemporary MOR, News, Talk	DYPS	5 kW	Tuburan
100.7 MHz	Radyo Bisdak Balamban	Times Broadcasting Network Corporation (operated by Bisdak Media Group)	Contemporary MOR, News, Talk	—N/a	1 kW	Balamban
101.3 MHz	Radyo Natin Daanbantayan	Manila Broadcasting Company	Contemporary MOR, Community radio	DYRO	1 kW	Daanbantayan
102.5 MHz	Radyo Natin Moalboal	Manila Broadcasting Company	Contemporary MOR, Community radio	DYRH	1 kW	Moalboal
102.9 MHz	Radyo Natin Madridejos	Manila Broadcasting Company	Contemporary MOR, Community radio	DYEE	1 kW	Madridejos
103.9 MHz	Radyo Natin Pinamungajan	Manila Broadcasting Company	Contemporary MOR, Community radio	DYRR	1 kW	Pinamungajan
104.5 MHz	Radyo Natin Argao	Philippine Broadcasting Corporation (operated by MBC Media Group)	Contemporary MOR, Community radio	DYRW	1 kW	Argao
105.3 MHz	Radyo Natin Dumanjug	Philippine Broadcasting Corporation (operated by MBC Media Group)	Contemporary MOR, Community radio	—N/a	1 kW	Dumanjug
