= List of television and radio stations in Metro Cebu =

The following are the lists of NTC-licensed television and radio stations broadcasting in Cebu City in the Republic of the Philippines, current as of 2024. The tables can be sorted by call sign, channel/frequency, branding, owner and notes. Also included below are defunct television and radio stations, cable & satellite providers and Internet-only stations.

== TV stations ==
=== Analog ===
==== VHF ====
Callsign	Channel	Freq. (MHz)	Programming	Owner
DYAE-TV	3	61.25 MHz	ALLTV (Note: Relay station of DZMV-TV Channel 2 Manila.)	Advanced Media Broadcasting System (Note: Operated under a brand licensing agreement by ABS-CBN Corporation)
DYCP-TV (Note: The station has an audio simulcast, which can be heard on the frequency of 87.7 MHz on the FM band. It ceased analog broadcasting on VHF channel 6 in 2018.)	6	83.25 MHz	INACTIVE	Southern Broadcasting Network
DYSS-TV	7	175.25 MHz	GMA	GMA Network Inc.
DYKC-TV	9 (Note: Transmitter location in Mandaue.)	187.25 MHz	RPTV (Note: Relay station of DZKB-TV Channel 9 Manila.)	Radio Philippines Network (Note: Operated under an airtime lease agreement by TV5 Network Inc.)
DYPT-TV	11	199.25 MHz	PTV (Note: Currently as a relay station of DWGT-TV Channel 4 Manila.)	People's Television Network
DYTV-TV	13	211.25 MHz	IBC (Note: Relay station of DZTV-TV Channel 13 Manila.)	Intercontinental Broadcasting Corporation

==== UHF ====
Callsign	Channel	Freq. (MHz)	Programming	Owner
DYET-TV	21	513.25 MHz	TV5 (Note: Relay station of DWET-TV Channel 5 Manila.)	TV5 Network Inc.
DYLS-TV	27	549.25 MHz	GTV (Note: Relay station of DWDB-TV Channel 27 Manila.)	GMA Network Inc.
DYAN-TV	29	561.25 MHz	RPTV (Note: Mirror Feed of DYKC-TV Channel 9.)	Nation Broadcasting Corporation (Note: Operated by TV5 Network Inc.)
PA (Note: With pending application with the NTC.)	33	585.25 MHz	—N/a	Sarraga Integrated And Management Corporation
DYNU-TV (Note: Ceased analog broadcasting on UHF channel 39 since 2024.)	39	621.25 MHz	INACTIVE	Progressive Broadcasting Corporation
PA	41	633.25 MHz	—N/a	Christian Era Broadcasting Service International

=== Digital ===
Callsign	UHF Channel	Freq. (MHz)	Programming	Owner
DYAE-DTV (Note: Currently under test broadcast.)	16	485.143 MHz	ALLTV	Advanced Media Broadcasting System
PA	17	491.143 MHz	IBC	Intercontinental Broadcasting Corporation
PA	18	497.143 MHz	TV5	TV5 Network Inc.
DYNZ-DTV	20	509.143 MHz	A2Z (Note: Semi-satellite station of DZOE-TV Channel 11 Manila.)	ZOE Broadcasting Network (Note: Operated under a blocktime agreement by ABS-CBN Corporation)
DYET-DTV	21	515.143 MHz	—N/a	TV5 Network Inc.
PA (Note: Offline as of December 2023 due to NTC's shutdown order.)	24	533.143 MHz	INACTIVE	Swara Sug Media Corporation
DYGA-DTV	25	539.143 MHz	Hope Channel Central Philippines (Note: Fully migrated from analog to digital.)	Gateway UHF Broadcasting
DYSS-DTV	26	545.143 MHz	GMA	GMA Network Inc.
DYLS-DTV	27	551.143 MHz	—N/a	GMA Network Inc.
DYAN-DTV	29	563.143 MHz	—N/a	Nation Broadcasting Corporation
DYCT-DTV	31	575.143 MHz	PRTV Prime Media / Bilyonaryo News Channel / D8TV	Broadcast Enterprises and Affiliated Media
PA	32 (Note: Transmitter location in Minglanilla.)	581.143 MHz	—N/a	Baycomms Broadcasting Corporation
PA	33	587.143 MHz	—N/a	Sarraga Integrated And Management Corporation
DYCP-DTV	35	599.143 MHz	—N/a	Southern Broadcasting Network
DYKC-DTV	38 (Note: Transmitter location in Mandaue.)	617.143 MHz	—N/a	Radio Philippines Network
DYNU-DTV	39	623.143 MHz	—N/a	Progressive Broadcasting Corporation
PA	41	635.143 MHz	—N/a	Christian Era Broadcasting Service International
DYPT-DTV	42	641.143 MHz	PTV	People's Television Network
PA	43	647.143 MHz	DZRH News Television	MBC Media Group
PA	44	653.143 MHz	—N/a	Sarraga Integrated And Management Corporation
DYFA-DTV	45	659.143 MHz	—N/a	Global Satellite Technology Services
DYTV-DTV	46	665.143 MHz	—N/a	Intercontinental Broadcasting Corporation
DYCS-DTV	47	671.143 MHz	Veritas TV / TV Fuerza	Radio Veritas Global Broadcasting, Inc.
PA	49	683.143 MHz	NET25	Eagle Broadcasting Corporation

== Defunct TV stations ==
- DYAC-TV
- DYBQ-TV
- DYBM-TV
- DYCB-TV
- DYCW-TV
- DYGC-TV
- DYNJ-TV
- DYNL-TV
- DYPN-TV
- DYTM-TV

== Cable & Satellite Providers ==
- Sky Cable Cebu
- Converge FiberTV Cebu
- Planet Cable Cebu
- Cebu Cable TV
- Cine Cebu Television Cable
- Cignal TV
- G Sat Direct TV

== Radio stations ==
=== AM ===
Callsign	Branding	Frequency	Owner
DYRB-AM	Radyo Pilipino	540 kHz	Radio Audience Developers Integrated Organization, Inc.
DYMR-AM	Radyo Pilipinas - Radyo Publiko	576 kHz (Note: Transmitter location in Carcar.)	Presidential Broadcast Service
DYHP-AM	DYHP RMN Cebu	612 kHz	Radio Mindanao Network
DYRC-AM	Aksyon Radyo	648 kHz (Note: Transmitter Location in Tangke, Talisay.)	MBC Media Group
DYKC-AM	RPN DYKC Radyo Ronda	675 kHz	Radio Philippines Network
DYAR-AM	Sonshine Radio	765 kHz	Swara Sug Media Corporation
DYDD-AM	Radyo SIAM	864 kHz	Sarraga Integrated And Management Corporation
DYLA-AM	DYLA 909	909 kHz	Vimcontu Broadcasting Corporation
DYMF-AM	Bombo Radyo	963 kHz	People's Broadcasting Service Inc. (Note: Operated by Bombo Radyo Philippines)
DYSS-AM	GMA Super Radyo DYSS	999 kHz	GMA Network Inc.
DYCM-AM	DYCM.DotTV	1152 kHz (Note: Transmitter location in Consolacion.)	Masbate Community Broadcasting Company (Note: Operated by Makati Broadcasting Company)
DYRF-AM	DYRF Radio Fuerza	1215 kHz	Word Broadcasting Corporation
DYFX-AM	Radyo Agila	1305 kHz	Eagle Broadcasting Corporation
DYXR-AM	DZRH (Note: Relay station from DZRH 666 Manila.)	1395 kHz	Cebu Broadcasting Company (Note: Operated by MBC Media Group)

=== FM ===
Callsign	Branding	Frequency	RDS ID	Owner
DYAP-FM	XFM	88.3 MHz	XFM CEBU	Southern Broadcasting Network (Note: Operated by Y2H Broadcasting Network)
DYDW-FM	Juander Radyo	89.1 MHz	—N/a	Word Broadcasting Corporation (Note: Operated by RSV Broadcasting Network)
DYKI-FM	Memories FM	89.9 MHz	MemoRieS	Primax Broadcasting Network
DYAC-FM	Brigada News FM (Note: Brigada News FM Cebu was previously on 93.1 FM under an blocktime with Vimcontu from its inception in July 2013 to the middle of 2023.)	90.7 MHz	BRIGADA	Mareco Broadcasting Network (Note: Operated by Brigada Mass Media Corporation)
DYHR-FM	Yes FM (Note: Yes FM Cebu was formerly used on 102.7 FM from 2000 to 2009.)	91.5 MHz	—N/a	Cebu Broadcasting Company
DYBN-FM	Solid FM	92.3 MHz	—N/a	Quest Broadcasting
DYWF-FM	FMR	93.1 MHz	Favorite Music Radio CEBU	Vimcontu Broadcasting Corporation (Note: Operated by Philippine Collective Media Corporation)
DYXL-FM	iFM	93.9 MHz	—N/a	Radio Mindanao Network
DYLL-FM	Energy FM (Note: Energy FM Cebu was previously on 90.7 FM from 1998 to 2003 and 89.1 FM from 2003 to 2004; both under airtime lease.)	94.7 MHz	—N/a	Ultrasonic Broadcasting System
DYMX-FM	Star FM	95.5 MHz	1. It's All; 2. For You	People's Broadcasting Service, Inc.
DYRK-FM	WRocK	96.3 MHz	WRocK	Exodus Broadcasting Company
DYBU-FM	Love Radio Cebu	97.9 MHz	—N/a	MBC Media Group
DYFR-FM	UP 987	98.7 MHz	UP987	Far East Broadcasting Company
DYRT-FM	Barangay LS (Note: GMA used to broadcast on 97.1 FM under the callsign DYLS from 1978 to 1979.)	99.5 MHz	—N/a	GMA Network, Inc.
DYRJ-FM	RJFM (Note: Relay station of 100.3 RJFM Manila.)	100.3 MHz	RJFMCebu	Free Air Broadcasting Network, Inc. (Note: Operated by Rajah Broadcasting Network)
DYIO-FM	Y101	101.1 MHz	—N/a	GVM Radio/TV Corporation (Note: Operated under airtime lease and shared sales agreement by Y2H Broadcasting Network)
DYFM-FM	True FM (Note: Currently as a repeater station of 105.9 True FM Manila.)	101.9 MHz	—N/a	Nation Broadcasting Corporation
DYES-FM	Easy Rock	102.7 MHz	—N/a	Pacific Broadcasting System
DYCD-FM	Retro Cebu (Note: UMBN used to air on 105.9 FM through airtime lease with Capricorn from 1994 to 2000.)	103.5 MHz	—N/a	Ditan Communications (Note: Operated by UM Broadcasting Network)
DYUR-FM	TMC	105.1 MHz	TMC	Ultimate Entertainment Inc. (Note: Operated an airtime lease agreement by Tops Media Center)
DYBT-FM	Monster BT 105.9	105.9 MHz	—N/a	Audiovisual Communicators
DYQC-FM	Home Radio	106.7 MHz	—N/a	Aliw Broadcasting Corporation
DYNU-FM	Win Radio	107.5 MHz	BIGRadio	Mabuhay Broadcasting System (Note: Operated by ZimZam Management)

== Defunct radio stations ==
- DYAB-AM
- DYAR
- DYAY
- DYBC-AM
- DYCB
- DYCH
- DYEE-AM
- DYEZ-FM
- DYHP-FM
- DYLA-FM
- DYLS-FM
- DYMZ
- DYNC
- DYTO
- DYWC

=== American colonial era ===
- KZRC
