= DYES-FM =

Radio station in Cebu City, Philippines

Easy Rock Cebu (DYES)
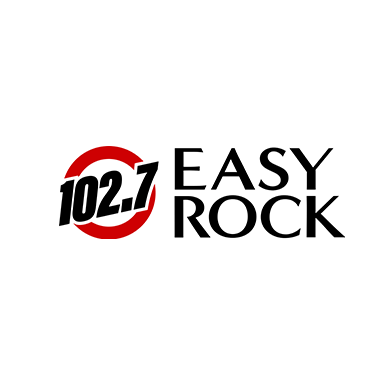
- Cebu City; Philippines
- Broadcast area: Metro Cebu and surrounding areas
- Frequency: 102.7 MHz
- Branding: 102.7 Easy Rock

Programming
- Language: English
- Format: Soft adult contemporary
- Network: Easy Rock

Ownership
- Owner: MBC Media Group; (Pacific Broadcasting System)
- Sister stations: DYRC Aksyon Radyo, DZRH Cebu, 91.5 Yes FM, 97.9 Love Radio, Radyo Natin 103.9 Pinamugajan, DYBU-DTV 43

History
- First air date: December 18, 1995
- Former call signs: DYTO (1995–2000)
- Former names: Showbiz Tsismis (1995–2000); Yes FM (2000–2009)
- Call sign meaning: Yes FM (former branding)

Technical information
- Licensing authority: NTC
- Class: A/B/C
- Power: 25,000 watts
- ERP: 45,000 watts

Links
- Webcast: Listen Live
- Website: www.easyrock.com.ph/cebu

DYES (102.7 FM), broadcasting as 102.7 Easy Rock, is a radio station owned and operated by MBC Media Group through its licensee Pacific Broadcasting System. The station's studio is located at Eggling Subd., Busay Hills, Cebu City and its transmitter is located at Legacy Village, Brgy. Kalunasan, Cebu City.

== History ==
The station was established on December 18, 1995 as a relay station of Manila-based Showbiz Tsismis under the call letters DYTO. At this time, its transmitter was located in Golden Peak Hotel and Suites along Gorordo Ave. On May 1, 2000, the station changed its call letters to DYES and rebranded as 102.7 Yes FM with a mass-based format. Initially automated, it launched its own set of DJs in 2006. It was this time when its studios and transmitter facilities were relocated to Busay Hills, along with DYBU and DYHR. It went off the air sometime in 2008. On July 1, 2009, the station returned on air as 102.7 Easy Rock and switched to a soft AC format, competing with WRocK.

On December 16 2021, the station went off the air after its studio and transmitter were destroyed by Typhoon Odette. In January 2022, it went back on the air.

In 2024, it transferred its transmitter site from its studio in Eggling Subdivision in Busay Hills to Brgy. Kalunasan (sharing the same site with sister stations DYBU and DYHR) for better signal reception.
