= DYBU =

DYBU may refer to both stations owned by the MBC Media Group in Cebu City:

- DYBU-FM, an FM station branded as Love Radio.
- DYBU-TV, a TV station branded as DZRH News Television.
