= DYDW =

DYDW may refer to the following stations owned by Word Broadcasting Corporation:

- DYDW-FM, a radio station in Cebu City, Philippines
- DYDW-AM, a radio station in Tacloban, Philippines
