= WRocK Online =

- Manila; Philippines
- Broadcast area: Worldwide
- Branding: WRocK Online

Programming
- Format: Soft AC

Ownership
- Owner: ACWS-United Broadcasting Network

History
- First air date: October 15, 1988 (terrestrial); October 2008 (online)
- Last air date: May 2010
- Former call signs: DWRK (1988–2008)
- Former frequencies: 96.3 MHz (1988–2008)

WRocK Online was an Internet radio station owned by ACWS-United Broadcasting Network.

== History ==
ACWS-United Broadcasting Network (ACWS-UBN) established DWBC-FM in 1972, as a simulcast of 940 kHz. In 1980, DWBC-FM changed its callsign to DWRK and rebranded as RK 96. Headed by Mike Pedero, it played Lite Rock, competing with easy listening stations DZMB 90.7 (now 90.7 Love Radio) and Mellow Touch 94.7 (now Mellow 947) before reformatting in 1988.

=== 96.3 WRocK ===
DWRK reformatted as 96.3 WRocK in 1988. The new format plays also love songs along with its lite rock songs. During the 1990s, it had a copyright infringement with 103.5 K-Lite with its use of the stinger "it's the true light rock" and "light rock with a kick". They also owned Ultravision 25 (now NET25, owned by Eagle Broadcasting Corporation).

In 1993, the Hodreal family (owners of ACWS-UBN) established Exodus Broadcasting Company, Inc. to launch WRocK in Metro Cebu under the call sign DYRK 96.3 FM.

On February 28, 2003, Republic Act No. 9192 signed by then-Philippine President Gloria Macapagal Arroyo which renewed ACWS-UBN's license for another 25 years. The law granted ACWS-UBN a franchise to construct, install, establish, operate and maintain for commercial purposes and in the public interest, radio and/or television broadcasting stations in the Philippines.

During the 2000s until its acquisition by MBC, DWRK hosted events and played music that inspired a generation up to October 26, 2008, when its DJ's aired the final edition of "Lite Rock Favorites of the Week" with DJs Cherry and Dylan Thomas.

On October 6, 2008, the Elizalde Group of Companies' Manila Broadcasting Company (MBC) acquired DWRK 96.3 FM from the Hodreal family for PhP229.6 million. Except for the acquisition price, further terms were not disclosed.

DWRK rebranded to 96.3 Easy Rock, while the Hodreal group continued to operate WRocK in its provincial stations.

=== Rebirth & Later years ===
In October 2008, the original WRocK resumed operations online through the hayag.com online stream. Listeners were able to hear WRocK through webstreaming powered by Hayag or the WRocK Online website.

In May 2010, due to lack of resources and financial challenges, it suspended its operations indefinitely. The Cebu station is currently the sole station carrying the WRock branding.

A year prior, the UMBN took over the operations of the Davao station as Hit Radio. In 2015, they acquired the frequency. The following year, it rebranded as Retro 95.5.

In 2015, a new group of investors acquired ACWS-UBN from the Hodreal group.
