= DYBU-DTV =

- Metro Cebu; Philippines
- City: Cebu City
- Channels: Digital: 43 (UHF) (ISDB-T) (test broadcast); Virtual: 43.01
- Branding: DZRH News Television

Programming
- Subchannels: 43.1: DZRHTV
- Affiliations: DZRH News Television

Ownership
- Owner: MBC Media Group
- Sister stations: DYRC Aksyon Radyo 648; DZRH 1395 Cebu; 91.5 Yes FM; 91.7 Ben FM; 97.9 Love Radio; 102.7 Easy Rock; 103.9 Radyo Natin Pinamungajan

History
- Founded: 1999
- Former call signs: DYBU-TV (1999-2018)
- Former channel numbers: Analog: 43 (UHF, 1999–2018)

Technical information
- Power: 1 kW

Links
- Website: dzrhnews.com.ph

DYBU-DTV (channel 43) is a television station in Metro Cebu, Philippines, serving as the Visayas flagship for DZRH News Television of MBC Media Group. The station maintains a transmitter facility at Eggling Subdivision, Busay Hills, Cebu City (sharing facilities with 91.5 Yes FM and 102.7 Easy Rock).

== Digital television ==
=== Digital channels ===
UHF Channel 43 (647.143 MHz)

Channel	Video	Aspect	Short name	Programming	Note
43.01	480i	16:9	DZRH News Television	DZRH News Television	Test Broadcast
43.31	240p	4:3	DZRH News Television 1seg	DZRH News Television	1seg

== See also ==
- DZRH-TV
- List of MBC Media Group stations
