= DYAM =

DYAM may refer to:

- DYAM-FM, an FM radio station broadcasting in Toledo, Cebu, branded as Hope Radio
- DYAM-TV, a TV station broadcasting in Roxas City, branded as GMA
