= DXEM =

Radyo Natin Marawi (DXEM)
Marawi; Philippines
- Broadcast area: Northern Lanao del Sur
- Frequency: 96.9 MHz
- Branding: Radyo Natin 96.9

Programming
- Languages: Maranao, Filipino, English
- Format: Community radio
- Network: Radyo Natin Network

Ownership
- Owner: MBC Media Group

History
- First air date: 1997

Technical information
- Licensing authority: NTC
- Power: 1,000 watts

DXEM (96.9 FM), broadcasting as Radyo Natin 96.9, is a radio station owned and operated by MBC Media Group. Its studios and transmitter are located along Quezon Ave., Marawi.
