= DYLA (disambiguation) =

DYLA is a Philippine radio station in Cebu City (909 KHz).

DYLA may also refer to:

- DYWF (93.1 MHz), a radio station in Cebu City formerly DYLA-FM, 1976–1992
- DYLA-FM (106.5 MHz), a radio station in Allen, Northern Samar operated by the Polytechnic Foundation of Cotabato and Asia
