= Manolo Elizalde =

Filipino businessman

Manuel "Manolo" Elizalde Sr. y Díaz-Moreu was a prominent Filipino businessman.

== Biography ==
Elizalde was born in Manila to José Joaquín Elizalde y Aicinena (the Philippine-born son of immigrant-merchant Joaquín Marcelino Elizalde e Yrisarry of Elizondo, Navarre, Spain, and of Carmen Díaz-Moreu e Yrissary (another Philippine-born Spaniard, daughter of the Spanish admiral Emilio Díaz-Moreu. He was a brother of diplomat Joaquín Miguel, polo players Juan Miguel and Ángel, the renowned musician and bandleader Federico, and Carmen.

During the 1920s, he was nicknamed "Lizz" Elizalde, playing the clarinet and the saxophone alongside his brother Fred.

He was married to Mary Cadwallader, a Filipino-American mestizo, and had three children: Manuel Jr. ("Manda"),, Mary Ruth and Federico ("Fred").

== Business ==
In 1936, he and his brothers established Elizalde & Company, Inc. after acquiring the major businesses of Ynchausti y Compañía, among them Ynchausti Shipping, Tanduay, YCO Paints and Floor Wax, and the Central Azucarera de La Carlota and Central Azucarera de Pilar (now Capiz Sugar Central) sugar refineries. After World War II, Elizalde became president of the company after his brother Mike decided to step down from the position in order to focus on his diplomatic career.

In 1946, Elizalde and his brothers established Manila Broadcasting Company to acquire the radio stations KZRH and KYRC.

== Sports ==
From the 1920s to the 1930s, Elizalde was an avid polo player together with his brothers Mike, Juan Miguel and Ángel. In January 1937, the Elizalde brothers inaugurated the Los Tamaraos Polo Club in Tambo, Parañaque after resigning their memberships in the Manila Polo Club in protest to the rejection of the membership application of Manuel Nieto, aide-de-camp of Philippine President Manuel L. Quezon. The Elizalde brothers proposed and seconded Nieto's membership application.

As a sports patron, he founded the YCO and the original Tanduay basketball teams.
