= Easy Rock =

Broadcast radio network in the Philippines

- Type: Broadcast radio network
- Country: Philippines
- Headquarters: MBC Building, Star City Complex, Pasay

Programming
- Language(s): English (main); Filipino and other regional languages (secondary)
- Format: Soft AC

Ownership
- Owner: MBC Media Group

History
- Founded: May 18, 2009

Coverage
- Availability: Nationwide

Links
- Webcast: easyrock.com.ph/radio
- Website: easyrock.com.ph

Easy Rock is a broadcast FM network in the Philippines owned by MBC Media Group. Its studios are located in MBC Building, Star City Complex, Pasay. Its flagship station is DWRK in Metro Manila.

The format of Easy Rock resembles that of WRocK, with "no/minimal talk, less commercials and more music".

== History ==
Easy Rock was formed on May 18, 2009. The formation of Easy Rock started with an initial rebrand of the newly acquired DWRK radio station, which MBC bought from the ACWS-United Broadcasting Network on October 6, 2008. The Easy Rock network was later expanded by rebranding a number of former Yes FM stations, Love Radio and Hot FM stations to Easy Rock.

== Easy Rock stations ==
Easy Rock is also broadcast to 8 provincial stations in the Philippines.

== See also ==
- MBC Media Group
