= ACWS-United Broadcasting Network =

Media company in the Philippines

- Type: Privately-held company
- Industry: Radio and television broadcasting
- Founded: 1960s
- Headquarters: Makati, Metro Manila, Philippines

ACWS-United Broadcasting Network is a broadcast media company in the Philippines. It owns several radio stations in areas, as well as its focus on the Multipoint Video Distribution System (MVDS) for wireless broadcast distribution.

== History ==
Associated Communications & Wireless Services was established by the Hodreal family in the 1960s. It obtained its Congressional franchise in 1969 when Republic Act No. 4551 was transferred from the Villaverde group.

It established DWBC-AM (then at 920 kHz) and its FM station counterpart in 1972, the year when the Philippines was under Martial Law. In 1980, DWBC-FM became DWRK (RK 96) and in 1988, relaunched under the new branding known as WRocK.

On July 27, 1999, ACWS-UBN launched its first television station known as UltraVision 25. The station, however, was short-lived and became the subject of a legal dispute when ACWS-UBN filed a case against the National Telecommunications Commission (NTC). In February 2009, the Supreme Court affirmed the case.

On February 28, 2003, Republic Act No. 9192 signed by then-Philippine President Gloria Macapagal Arroyo which renewed ACWS-UBN's license for another 25 years. The law granted ACWS-UBN a franchise to construct, install, establish, operate and maintain for commercial purposes and in the public interest, radio and/or television broadcasting stations in the Philippines.

On October 6, 2008, the Elizalde Group of Companies' Manila Broadcasting Company (MBC) has purchased DWRK from the Hodreal family, owners of ACWS-UBN, for PhP229.6 million. Except for the acquisition price, further terms were not disclosed.

While the Manila radio station (DWRK – rebranded to 96.3 Easy Rock) is under the control of MBC, Exodus Broadcasting Company, Inc. retained control of the WRocK provincial stations until in 2010 when it suspended its operations except the Metro Cebu station DYRK being remained.

In 2015, a new group of investors acquired ACWS-UBN from the Hodreal family. Since under the new ownership, the company obtained 2 FM stations under a provisional authority (but has since not yet to be operational), as the company proposes to enter joint-venture franchise agreements with various 3rd-parties to invest and operate thru either community radio and public broadcast. It also began resuming its television broadcast business through its engagement in MVDS for wireless distribution.

== List of stations ==
=== Reserved stations ===
Frequency	Coverage	Status
98.7 MHz	Laoag	Inactive (not yet operational)
93.3 MHz	Tuguegarao	Inactive (not yet operational)
93.9 MHz	Legazpi	Inactive (not yet operational)

=== Former stations ===
==== Radio ====
Callsign	Frequency	Coverage	Status
DWRK	96.3 MHz	Metro Manila	Sold to MBC Media Group in 2009.
DWBC	1422 kHz	Metro Manila	Off the air since 1999.

==== Television ====
Branding	Callsign	Ch. #	Location	Status
UltraVision 25	DWMJ-TV	25	Metro Manila	Acquired by Eagle Broadcasting Corporation. Currently broadcasts as NET25.
