= DYXR =

Radio station in Cebu City, Philippines

Relay of DZRH Manila
- Talisay; Philippines
- Broadcast area: Central Visayas and surrounding areas
- Frequency: 1395 kHz
- Branding: DZRH

Programming
- Language: Filipino
- Format: News, Public Affairs, Talk, Drama

Ownership
- Owner: MBC Media Group; (Cebu Broadcasting Company)
- Sister stations: DYRC Aksyon Radyo, 91.5 Yes FM, 97.9 Love Radio, 102.7 Easy Rock, Radyo Natin Pinamugajan, DYBU-DTV 43

History
- First air date: 1990
- Former call signs: DYCH (1990–1999); DYRC (1999–2010)

Technical information
- Licensing authority: NTC
- Class: Class B
- Power: 10,000 watts

Links
- Website: dzrhnews.com.ph

DYXR (1395 AM) is a relay station of DZRH, owned and operated by MBC Media Group through its licensee, Cebu Broadcasting Company. The station's relay transmitter is located at Brgy. Tangke, Talisay, Cebu.
