= St. Francis Square =

Commercial complex in Mandaluyong, Philippines

- The towers in 2012
- Alternative names: BSA Twin Towers

General information
- Status: Completed
- Location: Ortigas Center, Metro Manila, Philippines
- Coordinates: 14°35′9.76″N 121°3′29.66″E
- Construction started: 1998
- Completed: October 21, 2005 (St. Francis Square Mall); 2011 (BSA Twin Towers)
- Cost: ₱550 million (1998)
- Owner: St. Francis Square Group of Companies
- Operator: CE Construction

Height
- Antenna spire: 221 m (725 ft)
- Top floor: 177.8 m (583 ft)

Technical details
- Floor count: 55; 6 Basement Parking Levels
- Floor area: 101,700 m^{2} (1,095,000 sq ft) (Entire Complex); 78,600 m^{2} (846,000 sq ft) (BSA Twin Towers)
- Lifts/elevators: 10
- Grounds: 1.30 hectares (3.2 acres) (Entire Complex)

Design and construction
- Architect: R. Villarosa Architects
- Developer: St. Francis Square Group of Companies
- Structural engineer: D.M. Consunji, Inc.
- Main contractor: D.M. Consunji, Inc.
- Shopping mall details
- Opened: October 21, 2005; 21 years ago
- Num. of stores: 700–1,000 stalls and stores (formerly)
- Floor area: 23,100 m^{2} (249,000 sq ft)
- Floors: 5 floors aboveground, 1 floor belowground
- Website: stfrancissquare.com.ph

St. Francis Square is a 1.30 hectares (3.2 acres) mixed-use development located within the Ortigas Center central business district in Mandaluyong, Philippines. The development is owned and managed by the St. Francis Square Group of Companies and is located across the SM Megamall and beside The Podium. The complex has a total floor area of 101,700 m^{2} (1,095,000 sq ft) and consists of the BSA Twin Towers and the St. Francis Square Mall, which comprises a mixture of both retail and office spaces. The complex is also situated within a walking distance to the Ortigas station of the MRT 3 and the Ortigas Bus Stop of the EDSA Carousel.

== History ==
Groundbreaking and construction of the complex began in 1998 and was aimed to be completed in 2000. Due to some controversies regarding the financing of ASB Group of Companies, which later became known as the St. Francis Square Group of Companies, due to rising debts that caused the company to struggle to maintain profits, which later rose to a total of ₱12.7 billion, and alongside the effects of the 1997 Asian financial crisis. Due to these funding delays in the construction works, the interior finishing works for the twin towers were eventually halted. The delay also caused the St. Francis Group to prioritize other properties, which included the St. Francis Square Mall, which was completed in 2005, and other residential projects. After 9 years of being delayed, construction for the twin towers resumed in 2009 and the buildings were later finished in 2011.

== Components ==
The complex presently comprises two key properties, namely the BSA Twin Towers and the St. Francis Square Mall. Costing roughly ₱550 million during its construction in 1998, the complex sits on 1.30 hectares (3.2 acres) and were designed by local architecture firm R. Villarosa Architects. The complex was fully completed in 2011, with the completion of the BSA Twin Towers.

=== BSA Twin Towers ===
Street-level view of buildings

The complex has three buildings, but the main two towers are the most notable properties of the complex. Each tower stands 221 metres (725 ft) high, occupying a land area of 3,037.32 square metres (32,693 sq ft) of the site's land. The towers were initially topped off on 2000, yet was initially completed in 2011, wherein the two towers became the fourth-tallest buildings in the country. During the planning phase of the tower, the two towers were supposedly to feature a rooftop observation deck or a sky garden on their pyramid roofs, yet the plan was removed years later. The towers currently serve as a 3-star hotel as well as the radio transmitter of FM radio stations 90.7 Love Radio, 101.1 Yes FM and 96.3 Easy Rock; all owned by MBC Media Group. Between October and November 2019, amid the aftermath of a fire tragedy at Star City (which is located next to the MBC Building) in Pasay, the building served as a backup studio facility for the three stations, as well as temporary studios for AM radio station DZRH and community-formatted national FM network Radyo Natin. At night, the towers are illuminated with a neon light display from the central part of the towers to the tower's pyramid-style roofs, with logos of the St Francis Group of Companies, AUX Aircon, and HKTV (HongKong TV) attached on the roof's exteriors.

Office spaces are also present at the tower's three podium levels and are occupied by various local firms. The towers' amenities feature a lap pool, a lagoon pool, the Cornerstone restaurant, a children's playground, an outdoor jogging path at the ninth floor, four function rooms, and a gym located at the sixth floor.

=== St. Francis Square Mall ===
The St. Francis Square Mall is a four-storey mall located within the St. Francis Square complex which topped off in August 2005 and later opened on October 21, 2005. The mall has a total floor area of 23,100 m^{2} (249,000 sq ft) and are separated to the BSA Twin Towers' driveway and an open parking lot that caters both UV Express vehicles that serve the SM Megamall UV Express terminal and delivery trucks.

The Super Tiangge area of the mall once hosted over 1,000 stalls and stores. It also housed the Christ's Commission Fellowship (CCF) megachurch from 1997 to 2013, when the megachurch moved to the CCF Center in Frontera Verde (now Ortigas East) in Pasig.

In June 2019, the Super Tiangge area and the second and third levels of the mall were vacated to give way for renovation works. The mall later underwent major redevelopment, and eventually features a modernized facade. Some portions of the former retail spaces were converted to commercial and office spaces for business process outsourcing (BPO) and other local companies. The primary tenant of the building is St. Francis Square Group of Companies, which serves as the company's headquarters located on the building's fourth floor. Other tenants include Highpoint Services Philippines; Eastvantage, which has BPO office spaces on the second floor of the building, and Emapta, which occupies the building's fifth floor.

==== Lower levels ====
Tenants of the mall included the Puregold Jr. Supermarket on the basement floor, the St. Francis Generic Drug Store and St. Francis Bookstore on the ground floor, and the St. Francis Department Store at the mezzanine floor of the mall. At its peak, the mall attracted a daily foot traffic of 50,000 people, and was known for its tiangge stalls that mainly sold phone cases, gadget repair services, DVDs, and children's toys. Since July 2024, a portion of the mall's ground floor is occupied by the Ortigas campus of the Makati Hope Christian School.

==== Upper levels ====
The third, fourth, and fifth floors of the mall formerly housed the St. Francis branch of CCF. A part of the third floor acted as a transit floor for escalators from the second floor to the fifth floor as a direct access corridor to and from the CCF auditorium, while the fifth and sixth floors housed the 3,000-person capacity CCF Auditorium and other support facilities such as its clinic and overflow room.

== See also ==
- List of tallest buildings in the Philippines
