= DWRK =

Radio station in Metro Manila, Philippines

Easy Rock Manila (DWRK)
- Pasay; Philippines
- Broadcast area: Mega Manila and surrounding areas
- Frequency: 96.3 MHz
- RDS: EASYROCK
- Branding: 96.3 Easy Rock

Programming
- Language: English
- Format: Soft AC, OPM
- Network: Easy Rock

Ownership
- Owner: MBC Media Group
- Sister stations: DZRH-TV; DZRH; 90.7 Love Radio; 101.1 Yes FM

History
- First air date: 1972
- Former call signs: DWBC-FM (1972–1980)
- Former names: Real Radio (1980–1988); WRocK (1988–2009)
- Call sign meaning: WRocK (former branding)

Technical information
- Licensing authority: NTC
- Class: A/B/C
- Power: 25,000 watts
- ERP: 75,000 watts

Links
- Webcast: Listen Live
- Website: Easy Rock

DWRK (96.3 FM), broadcasting as 96.3 Easy Rock, is a radio station owned and operated by MBC Media Group. It serves as the flagship station of Easy Rock Network. The station's studio is located at the First floor, MMG Building, Star City, V. Sotto St., CCP Complex, Roxas Boulevard, Pasay, and its transmitter facilities are located at the BSA Twin Towers, Bank Drive, Ortigas Center, Mandaluyong, sharing the same site with sister stations 90.7 Love Radio and 101.1 Yes! FM.

== History ==
=== 1980–1988: Real Radio ===
ACWS-United Broadcasting Network established the station in 1972 as a simulcast of 940 kHz. On February 4, 1980, It became an originating station as RK96 Real Radio and changed its callsign to DWRK. Headed by Mike Pedero, it aired a Lite Rock format. Back then, its studios were located at the FEMS Tower 1 in San Andres, Manila.

In 1986, Mike Pedero left the station after six years and transferred to Citylite 88.3 (now Jam 88.3). Al Torres is one of the notable DJs who worked with the station.

=== 1988–2009: WRocK ===
On October 15, 1988, the station rebranded as 96.3 WRocK and switched to a Soft AC format, adding love songs to its lite rock playlist. During the 1990s, it had a copyright infringement with 103.5 K-Lite with its use of the stinger "it's the true light rock" and "light rock with a kick". During the 2000s, it began hosting events headlined by DJs Cherry Bayle (now with Radyo5) and Dylan Thomas.

On October 6, 2008, the Manila Broadcasting Company acquired the station from ACWS-UBN for ₱229.6 million. Except for the acquisition price, further terms were not disclosed.

=== 2009–present: Easy Rock ===
On October 26, 2008, the original WRocK transferred its operations online. Despite the move, MBC opted to retain the branding for the meantime. This was MBC's first venture into class upscale market. In December 2008, after a few weeks of automation, the station introduced a new set of DJs.

On May 18, 2009, to reflect the change, the station rebranded as Easy Rock. Most of its programming was similar to the one of WRock.

On October 2, 2019, the main studios of 96.3 Easy Rock at the MBC Building, CCP Complex in Pasay, along with its sister MBC Manila radio stations, were affected by a major fire that originated in the nearby Star City theme park. In interim, Easy Rock broadcast from its backup studio in BSA Twin Towers in Mandaluyong, where its transmitter is located.On November 11, 2019, Easy Rock moved its studio at Design Center of the Philippines, situated near the MBC Building across Vicente Sotto Street.

On November 15, 2021, after a two-year hiatus, the MBC stations returned to the newly renovated MBC Building inside the Star City complex, which was still under rehabilitation and reconstruction. At the same day, MBC relaunched its new corporate slogan, Sama-Sama Tayo, Pilipino! (lit. Together as One, Filipinos!) along with the new logos of all MBC radio stations.

== Theme music ==
=== WRocK ===
From 1988 until May 17, 2009, the jingles were resings from K-Lite 93.7's jingle package from Century 21 Programming (now TM Studios). It also had versions recorded by various local artists, including Sharon Cuneta, Regine Velasquez, Martin Nievera, The CompanY, Kuh Ledesma, Lea Salonga, Bituin Escalante, Christian Bautista, Jose Mari Chan, South Border, Nina, Agot Isidro etc. as part of its "Why does this singer have lite rock on his/her radio?" campaign. Since 2010, it has been exclusively heard on the surviving WRocK station, DYRK in Cebu.

=== Easy Rock ===
On May 18, 2009, along with the rebrand, it used the Delilah jingle package from ReelWorld, since it ironically has the similar tune as that of K-Lite's. Acapella versions of their jingles were used during their Monday program Remember Someone Today from October 2012 to February 2020.

On December 3, 2021, a few weeks after relaunching its logo, its jingle package was also revamped after 12 years, this time using the Easy Radio jingle package from ReelWorld while keeping the iconic melody of the station.

On July 1, 2026, as part of their 17th anniversary, the 2009 jingle package was fully restored after a 4 year hiatus, replacing the 2021 jingle package with the latter being used as a secondary jingle and as a commercial break bumper.

Aside from producing jingles for Easy Rock, ReelWorld also produced jingles for its sister stations, including Love Radio and Yes FM.

== HD Radio operations ==
At present, 96.3 Easy Rock is also heard via digital HD Radio via the HD1 channel. The HD2 channel carries the simulcast of Radyo Natin Nationwide, a hometown-formatted national radio station owned by MBC affiliate Radyo Natin Network. The HD3 channel carries a simulcast of sister AM station DZRH.

== See also ==
- 96.3 WRock Cebu
