= DYAJ =

Radio station in Ormoc, Philippines

Juander Radyo Ormoc (DYAJ)
- Ormoc; Philippines
- Broadcast area: Northwestern Leyte
- Frequency: 90.3 MHz
- Branding: 90.3 Juander Radyo

Programming
- Languages: Waray, Filipino
- Format: Contemporary MOR, News, Talk
- Affiliations: Catholic Media Network

Ownership
- Owner: Word Broadcasting Corporation
- Operator: RSV Broadcasting Network

History
- First air date: March 25, 2005
- Former names: Power 90.3 (2005–2025)

Technical information
- Licensing authority: NTC
- Power: 1,000 watts

Links
- Webcast: juanderormoc.ismyradio.com
- Website: juanderradyo.com

DYAJ (90.3 FM), broadcasting as 90.3 Juander Radyo, is a radio station owned by Word Broadcasting Corporation and operated by RSV Broadcasting Network. Its studio and transmitter are located at 2nd Floor., EBR Bldg, Real St, Cor. Carlos Tan St, Brgy. West, Ormoc.
