= Makati Hope Christian School =

Filipino-Chinese Christian school in Makati

Coordinates: 14°31′56″N 121°01′21″E

Makati Hope Christian School (MHCS), (simplified Chinese: 马加智嘉南学校; traditional Chinese: 馬加智嘉南學校; pinyin: Mǎjiāzhì Jiānán Xuéxiào; Pe̍h-ōe-jī: Má-ka-tì Ka-lâm Ha̍k-hāu) is a Filipino-Chinese school in Makati founded in 1985. It is owned by the St. Francis Square group of companies. Its students have performed well in government-administered examinations such as the National Achievement Test (NAT). In school year 2012-2013, its High 4 students ranked first in the NAT among private schools in Makati. Currently, the school has ACSCU-ACI Level III Accreditation.

== History ==
MHCS started operation with just a handful of kindergarten pupils and school personnel in 1985. To date, the student population has steadily increased along with school personnel. In 1986, the Early Childhood Department (formerly known as the Preschool Department) was granted recognition by DECS permit No. P-0066 series 1986. In 1989, the Elementary Department was granted recognition permit No. E-0001 series 1989. In 1993, government recognition was granted to the High School Department by virtue of DECS permit No. S-103 series 1993. The school has graduated 29 batches of high school students since that time. The school recently opened a new campus at St. Francis Square, Ortigas.

== Academics ==
The MHCS curriculum incorporates a three-fold blend of classroom instruction, mentoring intervention, and experiential learning.

The Early Childhood program offers Pre-Nursery, Nursery, Kinder and Grade 1.

The elementary and high school program includes Scholastic (English language learning software), Practical Music Course, computer and accounting subjects, alongside the expanded Math and Science program.

Makati Hope offers intensive Chinese language instruction from Early Childhood to High School. Christian Education is also integrated in all subject areas, as well as chapel services and other enrichment activities, to instill Christian values and principles.

Through the Information and Technology program, students learn about Visual Basic and C programming, web design, application, desktop publishing, and media software. Starting in 2024/2025, Makati Hope started offering Robotics classes for Grades 2 through 12. In this subject, students learn about Arduino, Python, and other robotic engineering principles. In the same year, Makati Hope started offering ACE (Aralinks Coding Education) classes for students to learn Makeblock coding (similar to Scratch).

== Clubs ==
Students may choose from various co-curricular and extra-curricular organizations such as the Student Council (SC), varsity teams, Young Christian Scientists’ Society (YCSS), Candle Pen, Library Enthusiasts’ Club (LEC), Art Club, Anvil of Christian Talents (ACTs), Robotics Club, and more.
