= DYHR =

Radio station in Cebu City, Philippines

Yes FM Cebu (DYHR)
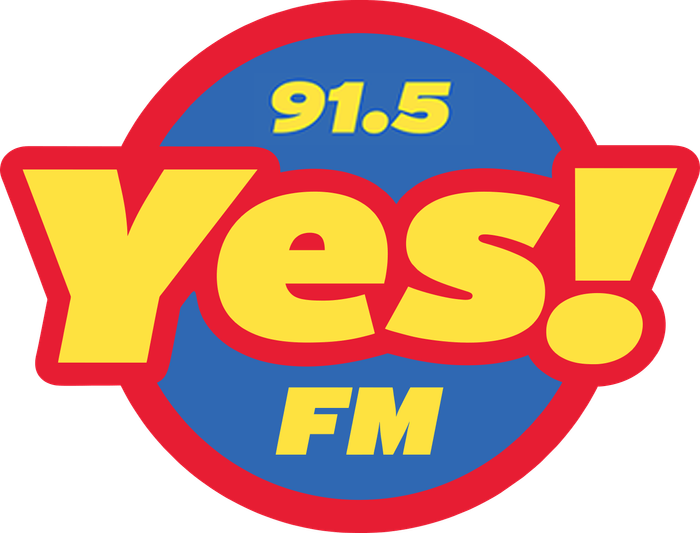
- Cebu City; Philippines
- Broadcast area: Metro Cebu and surrounding areas
- Frequency: 91.5 MHz
- Branding: 91.5 Yes FM

Programming
- Languages: Cebuano, Filipino
- Format: Contemporary MOR, OPM
- Network: Yes FM

Ownership
- Owner: MBC Media Group; (Cebu Broadcasting Company)
- Sister stations: DYRC Aksyon Radyo, DZRH Cebu, 97.9 Love Radio, 102.7 Easy Rock, Radyo Natin Pinamugajan, DYBU-DTV 43

History
- First air date: January 1, 1999
- Former names: Hot FM (1999–2014)
- Call sign meaning: Radio Heacock in reverse

Technical information
- Licensing authority: NTC
- Class: C/D/E
- Power: 25,000 watts
- ERP: 40,500 watts

Links
- Webcast: Listen Live
- Website: Yes FM Cebu

DYHR (91.5 FM), broadcasting as 91.5 Yes FM, is a radio station owned and operated by MBC Media Group through its licensee Cebu Broadcasting Company. The station's studio is located in Eggling Subd., Busay Hills, Cebu City, and its transmitter is located in Legacy Village, Brgy. Kalunasan, Cebu City.

== History ==
The station was established on January 1, 1999 as 91.5 Hot FM. In 2006, its studios were relocated from Cinco Centrum Inn to its present location in Busay Hills.

Yes! The Best Cebu logo from 2021 to 2024

On February 24, 2014, the station, along with the other O&O Hot FM stations, rebranded as 91.5 Yes FM. The branding was formerly used on 102.7 FM (currently known as Easy Rock) from 2000 to 2008. On May 1, 2017, it was rebranded as 91.5 Yes The Best.

On December 16, 2021, the station went off the air after its studio and transmitter were destroyed by Typhoon Odette. Two weeks later, it went back on the air just in time for New Year's Day.

On February 5, 2024, it was reverted as 91.5 Yes FM.
