= DWYS =

Radio station in Metro Manila, Philippines

Yes FM Manila (DWYS)
- 101.1 Yes! FM logo since February 2024
- Pasay; Philippines
- Broadcast area: Mega Manila and surrounding areas
- Frequency: 101.1 MHz
- RDS: 101.1YES
- Branding: 101.1 Yes FM

Programming
- Language: Filipino
- Format: Contemporary MOR, OPM
- Network: Yes FM

Ownership
- Owner: MBC Media Group; (Pacific Broadcasting System)
- Sister stations: DZRH-TV; DZRH; 90.7 Love Radio; 96.3 Easy Rock

History
- First air date: May 31, 1968
- Former call signs: DZFX (1968–1985); DWKS (1985–1995); DWST (1995–1998)
- Former names: DZFX (May 31, 1968 – October 11, 1985); Kiss FM (October 11, 1985 – June 1989); Kiss Jazz (June 1989 – December 1995); Showbiz Tsismis (December 18, 1995 – December 5, 1998); Yes The Best (July 18, 2016 – February 4, 2024)
- Call sign meaning: Yes

Technical information
- Licensing authority: NTC
- Class: C, D, E
- Power: 25,000 watts
- ERP: 75,000 watts

Links
- Webcast: Listen Live; Listen live (via TuneIn)
- Website: Yes FM

DWYS (101.1 FM), broadcasting as 101.1 Yes FM, is a radio station owned and operated by MBC Media Group through its licensee Pacific Broadcasting System. It serves as the flagship station of the Yes FM Network. The station's studio is located at the second floor, MMG Building, Star City, V. Sotto St., CCP Complex, Roxas Boulevard, Pasay, and its transmitter is located at the BSA Twin Towers, Bank Drive, Ortigas Center, Mandaluyong, sharing the same site with sister stations 90.7 Love Radio and 96.3 Easy Rock.

As of Q4 2022, 101.1 Yes FM is the 4th-most-listened-to FM radio station in Metro Manila, based on a survey commissioned by Kantar Media Philippines and Kapisanan ng mga Brodkaster ng Pilipinas.

== History ==
=== 1968–1985: DZFX ===
The station first went on the air on May 31, 1968 under the call letters DZFX. The country's first stereo-multiplex FM radio station, it was under the ownership of Makati Broadcasting Network Corporation, owned by businessmen Tony and Bob Garcia and Adolfo Duarte. It played classical music and "elevator music" and non-commercial station 98.7 DZFE was its only competitor. On October 11, 1985, a few minutes before 12 noon, it bade goodbye with a Mozart piece.

=== 1985–1989: Kiss FM ===
Shortly after DZFX 101.1's sign off on October 11, 1985, it was rebranded as Kiss FM 101.1 (call letters DWKS) with studios located at 14th floor of Insular Life Building at Ayala Avenue corner Paseo de Roxas, Makati, with "Dancing in the Streets" by Mick Jagger and David Bowie, as its first song played on the station. It introduced innovations like having the frequency number on its telephone number, programs like Top 20 at 12 and the launch date as 10–11, standing as the frequency. From 1985, it had the Contemporary Hit Radio format, competing directly with 99.5 RT (now 99.5 XFM Manila) and 97.1 WLS-FM (now Barangay LS 97.1). Singer Martin Nievera also worked with the station under his sobriquet "Mad Man" and had his program every Saturday afternoons.

=== 1989–1995: Kiss Jazz ===
It changed its name to Kiss Jazz 101.1 and transformed into a smooth jazz format from June 1989 to December 1995 competing directly with Citylite 88.3 (now Jam 88.3) before it quietly went off the air.

=== 1995–1998: Showbiz Tsismis ===
On December 18, 1995, Manila Broadcasting Company acquired 101.1 FM from Makati Broadcasting Network, launching 101.1 Showbiz Tsismis, the country's first FM station to blend show business gossip with music. Operating under the call sign DWST, which stood for "Showbiz Tsismis" (Showbiz Gossip), the station moved its studio to the FJE Building in Legazpi Village, Makati, integrating them with the existing DZRH facilities

101.1 Showbiz Tsismis distinguished itself by incorporating show business news reports delivered by reporters in a style similar to AM stations. It is also made history by being the first Philippine radio station to simulcast its programming via satellite.

=== 1998–present: Yes! FM/Yes! The Best ===
On December 6, 1998, 101.1 was re-launched as Yes! FM 101.1 with new call letters DWYS. Shifting to a mass-based format, similar to its sister station 90.7 Love Radio it quickly became the undisputed number 1 FM station from 1999 to 2002.

In July 2002, all Manila Broadcasting Company (MBC) stations relocated from the FJE Building in Makati to the Star City Complex in Pasay, Philippines.

In 2008, Yes! FM 101.1 underwent another repackaging, adopting the slogan "Automatic 'Yan!" (It's Automatic!). While its playlist closely mirrored that of 90.7 Love Radio, its overall programming maintained a distinct identity.

As part of the "Radyo? Dalawa Lang Yan!" (transl. Radio? There's Only Two!) campaign, launched by Yes! FM and Love Radio in early 2011, a significant DJ reshuffle occurred in 2012. Several DJs from 90.7 Love Radio including Rica Herra, Missy Hista, Rico Pañero and Lala Banderas moved to Yes! FM 101.1. In exchange, Diego Bandido, Emma Harot, Kristine Dera and Robin Sienna transferred to Love Radio. This shift also coincided with Yes! FM 101.1's new "Hayahay" branding, a slogan that was subsequently adopted by other Yes! FM, Hot FM, and Love Radio stations.

In 2014, Yes! FM was awarded the Gawad Tanglaw Hall of Fame award, having been awarded as the Best FM Station for five consecutive years.

On July 18, 2016, at 6:00 AM, the station rebranded as 101.1 Yes! The Best, adopting the new slogan, "The Millennials' Choice." This change also marked the removal of its Sunday playlist and shift in DJ on-air delivery, with hosts now speaking a mix of English and Tagalog, a departure from its sister station's style. Concurrently, all provincial Yes! FM stations were also rebranded as Yes! The Best.

On May 1, 2017, 101.1 Yes! The Best launched the Yes! The Best App, a pioneering mobile application that introduced the first social TV experience for FM radio in the Philippines.

On August 10, 2018, Yes! The Best Manila's YouTube channel was awarded a Silver Play Button for surpassing 100,000 subscribers. As of May 2025, the channel boasts over 600,000 subscribers and continues to grow, offering a diverse range of content including vlogs, dance challenges, and radio show segments.

On December 8, 2018, the station marked its 20th anniversary.

On October 2, 2019, a major fire originating from the nearby Star City theme park affected the main studios of 101.1 Yes the Best and its sister MBC radio stations at the MBC Building, CCP Complex in Pasay. In interim, Yes! The Best currently broadcasts from its backup studio in BSA Twin Towers, where its transmitter is located. On November 11, 2019, Yes! The Best Manila moved its studio at Design Center of the Philippines, situated near the MBC Building across Vicente Sotto Street.

After a two year hiatus, on November 15, 2021, Yes! The Best Manila, along with its sister stations Love Radio Manila and Easy Rock Manila, returned to the newly renovated MBC Building within the Star City complex which was still undergoing rehabilitation and reconstruction. On the same day, MBC relaunched its new corporate slogan, Sama-Sama Tayo, Pilipino! (lit. transl. We're all together, Filipinos!) accompanied by updated logos of all MBC radio stations.

On February 5, 2024, Yes! The Best Manila and its provincial counterparts reverted to their original branding as Yes! FM. This change coincided with the rebranding of their parent company, Manila Broadcasting Company, to MBC Media Group the following day.
