= DWBC-AM =

DWBC
- Manila; Philippines
- Broadcast area: Metro Manila and surrounding areas
- Frequency: 1422 kHz

Programming
- Format: Silent

Ownership
- Owner: Advanced Media Broadcasting System

History
- First air date: 1972
- Last air date: 1999
- Former frequencies: 940 kHz (1972 - 1978); 954 kHz (1978 - 1987)

Technical information
- Licensing authority: NTC

DWBC (1422 AM) was a radio station owned and operated by Advanced Media Broadcasting System.

== History ==
DWBC was established in 1972 by the ACWS - United Broadcasting Network, along with sister station DWRK. In November 1978, it moved to 954 kHz from its original frequency 940 kHz, in response to the adoption of the 9 kHz spacing on AM radio stations in the Philippines under the Geneva Frequency Plan of 1975.

In April 1987, it moved to its present frequency 1422 kHz. Its former frequency is currently used by DZEM. In October that year, it was one of the stations closed by the National Telecommunications Commission, through the order of then-president Corazon Aquino, for a few months for airing right-wing commentary programs that were critical of Mrs. Aquino's Administration. On January 1, 1988, it returned on the air.

It went off the air sometime in 1999. The frequency is currently owned by the Advanced Media Broadcasting System.
