= DYDW-AM =

Radio station in Tacloban, Philippines

DYDW
- Tacloban; Philippines
- Broadcast area: Northern Leyte, southern Samar
- Frequency: 531 kHz

Programming
- Format: Silent

Ownership
- Owner: Word Broadcasting Corporation

History
- First air date: February 26, 1989
- Last air date: November 8, 2013
- Former names: Radyo Diwa
- Former frequencies: 1413 kHz (1989-2004)
- Call sign meaning: Diwa

Technical information
- Licensing authority: NTC

Links
- Website: http://radyodiwa.blogspot.com/

DYDW (531 AM) was a radio station owned and operated by Word Broadcasting Corporation. It was formerly known as Radyo Diwa from February 26, 1989 to November 8, 2013, when it went off the air after its transmitter was destroyed by Super Typhoon Yolanda.
