= DYJS =

Philippine radio station

Hug Radio
Bogo, Cebu; Philippines
- Broadcast area: Northern Cebu
- Frequency: 93.3 MHz
- Branding: Hug Radio 93.3

Programming
- Languages: Cebuano, Filipino
- Format: Contemporary MOR, OPM

Ownership
- Owner: Vimcontu Broadcasting Corporation

History
- First air date: May 27, 2013

Technical information
- Licensing authority: NTC
- Power: 5 kW

Hug Radio 93.3 (DYJS 93.3 MHz) is an FM station in the Philippines, owned and operated by Vimcontu Broadcasting Corporation. Its studios and transmitter are located at Central Nautical Highway, Bogo, Cebu.
