= Pacific Broadcasting System =

Filipino radio network

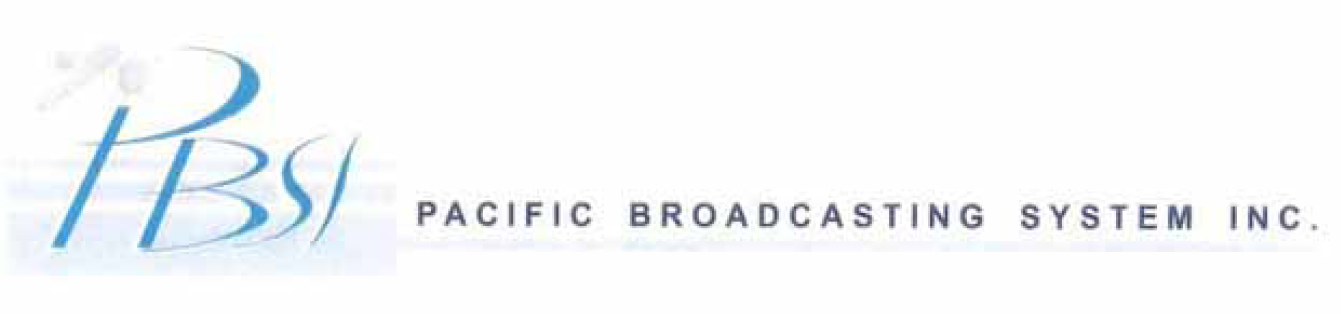
- Type: Subsidiary
- Industry: Radio network
- Founded: 1968
- Headquarters: Pasay, Metro Manila, Philippines
- Owner: Elizalde Holdings Corporation
- Parent: MBC Media Group
- Website: mbcmediagroup.com

Pacific Broadcasting System (PBSI) is a radio broadcast company in the Philippines. It is part of the FJE Group of Companies of the Elizalde family, which also operates hotels and Pasay-based amusement park Star City. Pacific Broadcasting's stations are being operated by Elizalde-owned TV and radio network MBC Media Group. Most of its AM stations in key provinces are relay stations of DZRH, while its flagship AM station is DXGO, a radio station in Davao City broadcasting as Aksyon Radyo Davao. PBSI's flagship FM station is DWYS 101.1 Manila which also serves as the flagship affiliate station to MBC's Yes FM Network, with most of its FM stations in the provinces are affiliated with MBC's other FM networks (Love Radio, Easy Rock and Radyo Natin).

== See also ==
- List of MBC Media Group stations#Aksyon Radyo
- List of MBC Media Group stations#Yes FM
- MBC Media Group
- Aksyon Radyo U.S.
