= DYBU-FM =

Radio station in Cebu City, Philippines

Love Radio Cebu (DYBU)
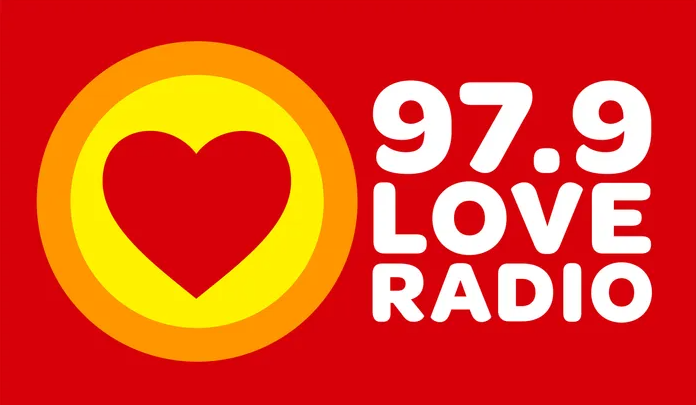
- Cebu City; Philippines
- Broadcast area: Metro Cebu and surrounding areas
- Frequency: 97.9 MHz
- Branding: 97.9 Love Radio

Programming
- Languages: Cebuano, Filipino
- Format: Contemporary MOR, OPM
- Network: Love Radio

Ownership
- Owner: MBC Media Group
- Sister stations: DYRC Aksyon Radyo, DZRH Cebu, 91.5 Yes FM, 102.7 Easy Rock, Radyo Natin Pinamugajan, DYBU-DTV 43

History
- First air date: 1950s (on AM); February 14, 1975 (on FM)
- Former frequencies: 970 kHz (1950s-1975)
- Call sign meaning: None; sequentially assigned

Technical information
- Licensing authority: NTC
- Power: 25,000 watts
- Transmitter coordinates: 10.1907° N, 123.5401° E

Links
- Webcast: Listen Live
- Website: Love Radio Cebu

DYBU (97.9 FM), broadcasting as 97.9 Love Radio, is a radio station owned and operated by MBC Media Group. The station's studio is located at Room 303, 3/F Doña Luisa Bldg., Fuente Osmeña, Cebu City, and its transmitter is located at Legacy Village, Brgy. Kalunasan, Cebu City. DYBU is the pioneer music station in Cebu.

== Broadcasting history ==
=== 1950s-1975: Early Years ===
DYBU was established as the first music radio station in Cebu in the 1950s and was then originally broadcast at 970 kHz, four years after DZMB in Manila was founded on July 1, 1946 when started operations. It also serves as the sister station of DYRC, which was acquired by the Elizalde family after World War II. In September 1972, when the President Ferdinand Marcos declared Martial Law, DYBU and DYRC halted their operations.

=== 1975-1980s: Move to FM ===
On February 14, 1975, DYBU returned on-air, this time on the FM band on 97.9 MHz. The station started airing as an easy listening format, along with news updates throughout the day, earning the on-air moniker known as "Beautiful Music", with studios located at the DYRC-DYBU FM Production in F. Ramos St. During Sundays, DYBU simulcasted its programming from DYRC to produce stereo sound; it also sometimes accept religious blocktime programs. Some of the lead disc jockeys of DYBU were Lady Godiva, Rolly Chica and Jerry Wonder, among others.

=== 1980s-present: Love Radio ===
In the 1980s, when then-Manny Luzon took over the management of MBC's FM stations, DYBU was rebranded under the new identity 97.9 Love Radio, using the English medium. It played mainstream pop, later relegating to easy listening music. Most of the station's notable programs were Morning Love Drive, Afternoon Love Drive, Evening Love Drive, Sunday Golden Morning, The Jukebox Hits, Sunday Afternoon Special and Sunday Showdown. Back then, it operated daily from 4:30 am to midnight. At that time the station's studios moved from DYRC-DYBU FM Production in F. Ramos St. to Cinco Centro Inn along Fuente Osmeña.

On February 14, 2000, coinciding with the Manila station's 25th anniversary, Love Radio was relaunched its new logo and carried the tagline "Kailangan pa bang i-memorize 'yan? Bisyo na 'to!", a common everyday expression of Filipinos. Following the relaunch, the station switched to a mass based format after the success of its sister FM stations Yes FM and Hot FM. It also aired Quatro Cantos (Four Songs), a daily music countdown of Love Radio featuring four songs voted by listeners via SMS.

In 2006, Love Radio Cebu, together with all MBC stations, transferred its studios to Eggling Subdivision, Busay Hills and it expanded its operations into 24/7. The station also revolutionized radio promotions and events with Singing Idol, Pengeng Cake Birthday Ko Naman eh!, Month of May - Pahalipay Fiesta sa Love Radio, Pengeng Load unload ko eh! and KASAKANTA, among others. On December 6, 2015, Love Radio Cebu moved to its current home in Doña Luisa Bldg. in Fuente Osmeña to adjust to modern broadcast standards.

In late-2021, the station went off the air after its studio and transmitter were destroyed by Typhoon Odette. Two weeks later, it went back on the air just in time for New Year's Day.
