= Joaquín Miguel Elizalde =

Filipino diplomat and businessman

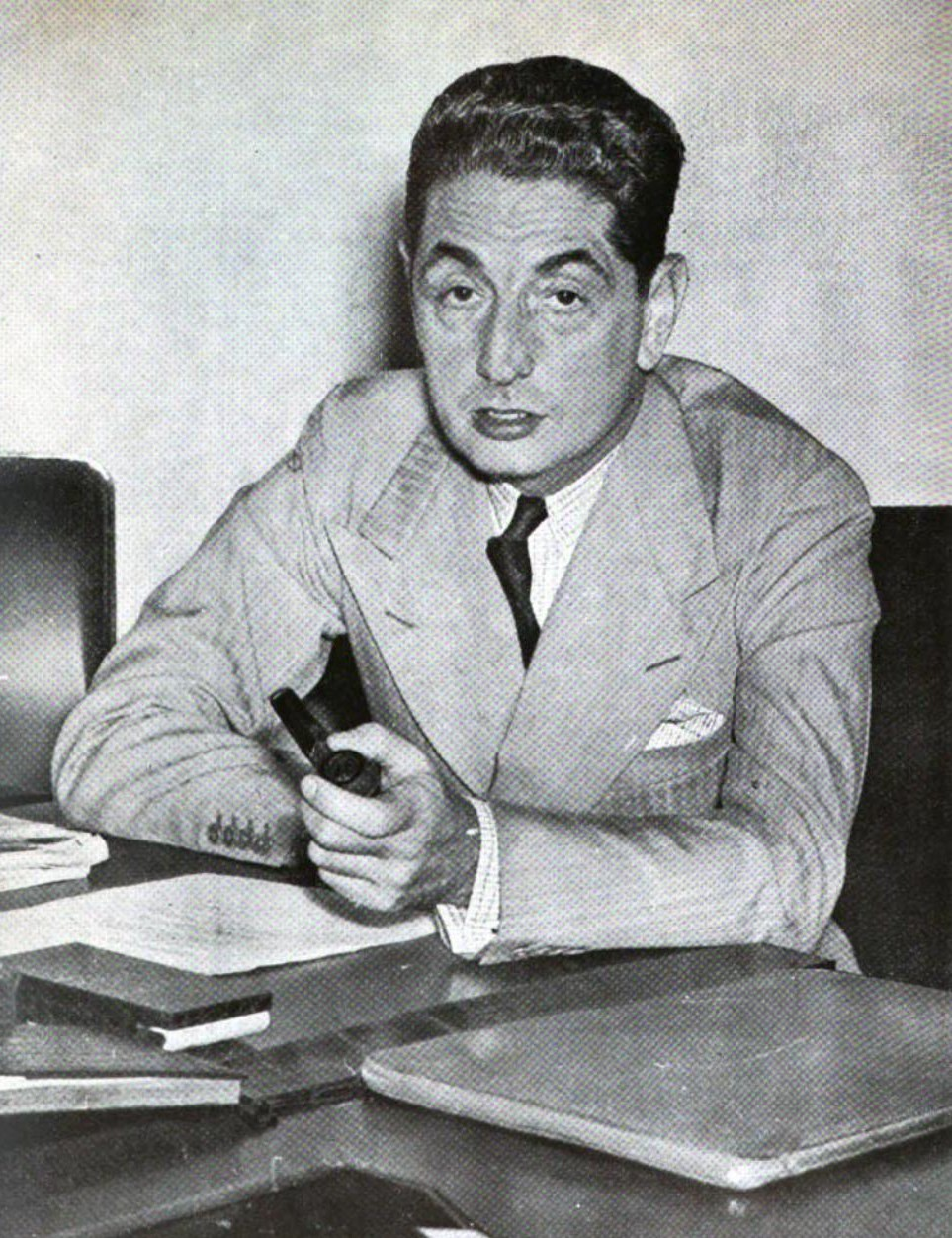
- Photograph from The Commercial & Industrial Manual of the Philippines, 1941

6th Secretary of Foreign Affairs
- In office April 18, 1952 – December 30, 1953
- President: Elpidio Quirino
- Preceded by: Carlos P. Romulo
- Succeeded by: Carlos P. Garcia

Ambassador of the Philippines to the United States
- In office July 6, 1946 – January 1952
- President: Manuel Roxas; Elpidio Quirino
- Preceded by: Position established
- Succeeded by: Carlos P. Romulo

Resident Commissioner of the Philippines
- In office September 29, 1938 – August 9, 1944
- Preceded by: Quintin Paredes
- Succeeded by: Carlos P. Romulo

Personal details
- Born: Joaquín Miguel Elizalde y Díaz-Moreu; August 2, 1896 Manila, Captaincy General of the Philippines
- Died: February 9, 1965 (aged 68) Washington, D.C., U.S.
- Spouse(s): Elena von Kauffmann (m. 1924; div. 1927) Susan Magalona
- Children: 4

Military service
- Allegiance: Philippines; United States
- Branch/service: Philippine Commonwealth Army
- Rank: Major
- Battles/wars: World War II

Joaquín Miguel Elizalde y Díaz-Moreu (August 2, 1896 – February 9, 1965) was a Filipino diplomat and businessman.

== Personal life ==
Elizalde was born on August 2, 1896, in Manila, to José Joaquín Elizalde y Aicinena (the Philippine-born son of immigrant-merchant Joaquín Marcelino Elizalde e Yrisarry of Elizondo, Navarre, Spain, and of Carmen Díaz-Moreu e Yrissary (another Philippine-born Spaniard, daughter of the Spanish admiral Emilio Díaz-Moreu. Nicknamed "Mike" in his adulthood, Elizalde was the eldest of six siblings. His brothers included Juan Miguel (killed by the Japanese during World War II), Ángel, Manuel (who later on became president of the family conglomerate Elizalde y Compañía); the renowned musician Federico, nicknamed "Fred", and a sister named Carmen.

He was educated at St. Joseph's College, London and Dr. Schmidt's Institute in St. Gallen, Switzerland.

Elizalde was first married to Elena von Kauffmann in 1924 and had two daughters, Cecilia and Elena. The couple divorced in 1957.

He later married Susan Magalona (born Susana Clarita Magalona y Gayoso, 1921-2014), daughter of Philippine senator Enrique Magalona and sister of Filipino actor Pancho Magalona. The couple had two children, Maria Theresa (nicknamed "Tracey") and Juan Miguel (nicknamed "J.M.", who died in 2007).

== Business career ==
In 1936, Elizalde and his brothers established Elizalde & Company, Inc. after acquiring the major businesses of Ynchausti y Compañía, among them Ynchausti Shipping, Tanduay, YCO Paints and Floor Wax, and the Central Azucarera de La Carlota and Central Azucarera de Pilar (now Capiz Sugar Central) sugar refineries.

Elizalde was the company's first president. After World War II, he decided to focus on his diplomatic career and was succeeded as president of the company by his brother Manolo.

== Diplomatic career ==
Elizalde became an economic adviser to President Manuel L. Quezon in 1937 and 1938. He became a member of the National Economic Council 1937–1941 and 1952 and 1953, and of the Joint Preparatory Committee on Philippine Affairs in 1936 and 1937. He was also a member of the Council of State 1936 to 1941 and 1952 to 1953 and served as Major of the Cavalry Reserve, Philippine Army.

=== As Resident Commissioner to the U.S. House of Representatives ===
Elizalde was appointed Resident Commissioner to the U.S. House of Representatives on September 29, 1938, to fill the vacancy caused by the resignation of Quintin Paredes and served until his resignation on August 9, 1944. He became a member of the war cabinet of President Quezon in 1941.

=== As International Monetary Fund governor ===
In 1946, he became a member of the board of governors of the International Monetary Fund and of the International Bank for Reconstruction and Development until 1950 and was the Philippine ambassador to the United States from July 6, 1946, until January 1952.

He was the first of only two former US congressmen to later serve as an ambassador from another country.

=== Secretary of Foreign Affairs under President Quirino ===
He also served as Secretary of Foreign Affairs of the Republic of the Philippines from 1952 to 1953, under the administration of President Elpidio Quirino and an economic adviser to the Philippine Mission at the United Nations, with the rank of Ambassador from 1956 to 1965. He represented the Philippines at the coronation of Elizabeth II on June 2, 1953.

== Polo ==
He was an avid polo player together with his brothers, Juan Miguel, Ángel and Manolo. In January 1937, the Elizalde brothers inaugurated the Los Tamaraos Polo Club in Tambo, Parañaque after resigning their memberships in the Manila Polo Club in protest to the rejection of the membership application of Manuel Nieto, aide-de-camp of Philippine President Manuel L. Quezon. The Elizalde brothers proposed and seconded Nieto's membership application.

== Gallery ==
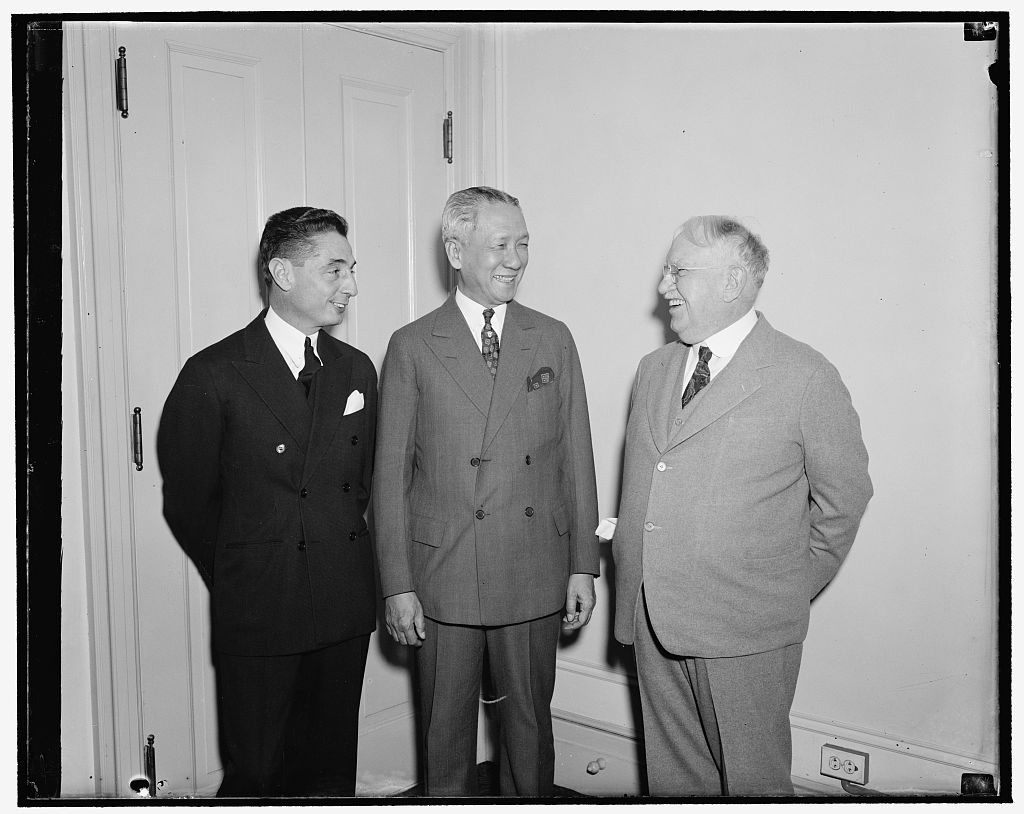
Elizalde in Washington (1938)

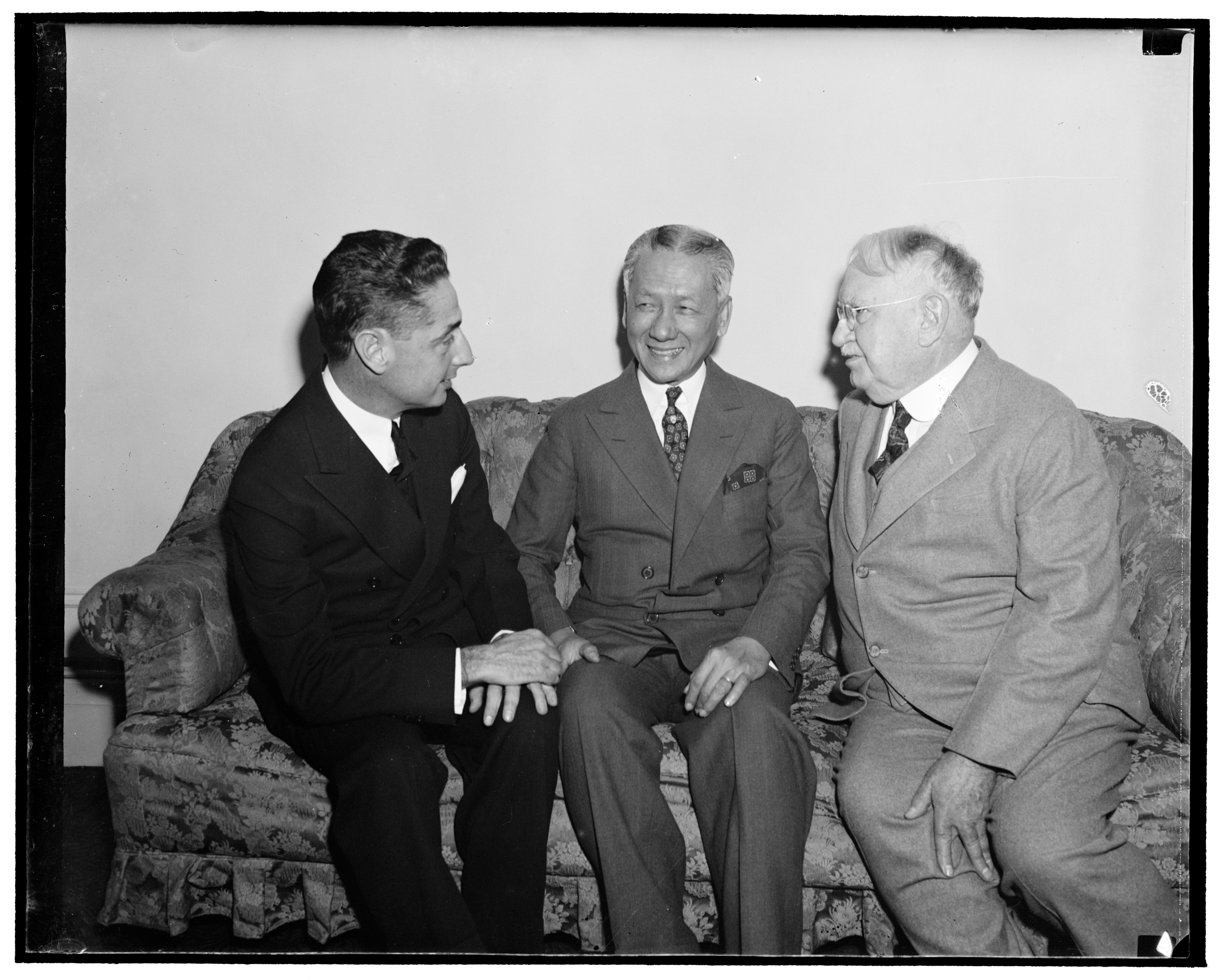
J. M. Elizalde, Sergio Osmeña, and John W. Hausermann, taken in 1938 or 1939, Harris & Ewing Collection, U.S. Library of Congress

== See also ==
- List of Hispanic and Latino Americans in the United States Congress
- Resident Commissioner of the Philippines
- Department of Foreign Affairs (Philippines)

U.S. House of Representatives
Preceded by Quintin Paredes	Resident Commissioner from the Philippines to the United States Congress; 1938–1944	Succeeded by Carlos P. Romulo
Diplomatic posts
New title Philippine Independence from U.S.	Philippine Ambassador to the United States; 1946–1952	Succeeded by Carlos P. Romulo
Government offices
Preceded by Carlos P. Romulo	Secretary of Foreign Affairs; 1952–1953	Succeeded by Carlos P. Garcia
