= MVDS =

MVDS is an acronym for terrestrial "Multipoint Video Distribution System". An MVDS is a terrestrial wireless technology used to broadcast television and other video audio signals from a central transmitter to consumers using directive antennas, point-to-multipoint delivery, and microwave frequency bands.

MVDS are useful in "areas where traditional cable infrastructure is limited or absent."

MVDS currently is a part of broader MWS (Multimedia Wireless System) standards. In the European Union MWS works in 10.7–13.5 and 40.5–43.5 GHz frequency bands.

Research for 42 GHz frequency has been done under the European Commission EMBRACE (Efficient Millimetre Broadband Radio Access for Convergence and Evolution) initiative.

== Standards ==
=== ETSI ===
- EN 300 748
- EN 301 215-3
- EN 301 997-2

=== UK Standards ===
- MPT 1550 (obsolete)
- MPT 1560 (obsolete)

=== CEPT ===
- ERC/DEC/(99)15
- ECC/REC/(01)04

== Manufacturers of MVDS equipment ==
- MDS America Inc
- Newtec
- EF Data
- BluWan
- Philips Broadband Network
- Hughes Network systems
- Thales Group (Thomson)
- Trophy electronics
- Technosystem Digital Network S.p.A. (TDN)
- Marconi Technology Centres (GMTT)
- United Monolithic Semiconductors (UMS)
- DOK Ltd (Elvalink)
- Q-par Angus Ltd
- ROKS
- UMT
