= DYMM-FM =

Brigada News FM Bogo (DYMM)
Bogo, Cebu; Philippines
- Broadcast area: Northern Cebu
- Frequency: 90.9 MHz
- Branding: 90.9 Brigada News FM

Programming
- Languages: Cebuano, Filipino
- Format: Contemporary MOR, News, Talk
- Network: Brigada News FM

Ownership
- Owner: Brigada Mass Media Corporation; (Baycomms Broadcasting Corporation)

History
- First air date: 2015

Technical information
- Licensing authority: NTC
- Power: 5 kW
- ERP: 10 kW

Links
- Webcast: Live Stream
- Website: www.brigadanews.ph

90.9 Brigada News FM (DYMM 90.9 MHz) is an FM station owned and operated by Brigada Mass Media Corporation. Its studios and transmitter are located at J. Lequin St., Bogo, Cebu.
