= DYBG =

Philippine radio station

Ben FM (DYBG)
Medellin; Philippines
- Broadcast area: Northern Cebu
- Frequency: 91.7 MHz
- Branding: 91.7 Ben FM

Programming
- Languages: Cebuano, Filipino
- Format: Contemporary MOR, News, Talk

Ownership
- Owner: MBC Media Group

History
- First air date: 2002
- Former names: Radyo Natin (2002–2018)
- Call sign meaning: BoGo

Technical information
- Licensing authority: NTC
- Power: 1,000 watts
- ERP: 5,000 watts

DYBG (91.7 FM), broadcasting as 91.7 Ben FM, is a radio station owned and operated by MBC Media Group. Its studio is located at Brgy. Curva, Medellin, Cebu. The station was formerly part of Radyo Natin Network from 2002 to 2018.
