= DYNJ-TV =

DYNJ-DTV
Cebu City; Philippines
- City: Cebu City
- Channels: Digital: 33 (UHF) (ISDB-Tb); Virtual: 33
- Branding: RJTV 33 Cebu

Programming
- Subchannels: See list
- Affiliations: 33.21: RJTV (Independent); 33.22: Timeless TV; 33.23: Radyo Bandido TV; 33.24: Rock MNL; 33.25: TV Maria; 33.26: RJTV SD6

Ownership
- Owner: Rajah Broadcasting Network
- Sister stations: DYRJ

History
- Founded: 2008
- Former channel numbers: Analog: 33 (UHF) (2008-2018)
- Former affiliations: Solar Entertainment Corporation / 2nd Avenue (2008-2018)
- Call sign meaning: DY; New Jam; Nadine Jacinto

Technical information
- ERP: 5 kW TPO

RJTV 33 Cebu (DYNJ-DTV) was a UHF free to air television channel, formerly owned and operated by Rajah Broadcasting Network Inc. owned by Ramon "RJ" Jacinto.

== RJTV programs ==
Note: Two shows from RJTV continues airing (Thank God It's RJ Live! and RJ Sunday Jam) at 23:00 and 09:00 PHT respectively.

== Technical information ==
=== Digital channels ===
DYNJ-TV operates on UHF Channel 33 (587.143 MHz) and is multiplexed into the following subchannels:

Subchannels of DYNJ-DTV
Channel	Video	Aspect	Short name	Programming	Note
33.21	480i	16:9	RJ DigiTV	Main DYNJ-TV programming/RJ DigiTV	Fully migrated from analog to digital (Still under test broadcast)
33.22	480i	16:9	Timeless TV	Timeless TV	Fully migrated from analog to digital (Still under test broadcast)
33.23	480i	4:3	Radyo Bandido TV	Radyo Bandido TV	Fully migrated from analog to digital (Still under test broadcast)
33.24	480i	16:9	Rock of Manila TV	RJTV Rock	Fully migrated from analog to digital (Still under test broadcast)
33.25	480i	16:9	TV Maria	TV Maria	Fully migrated from analog to digital (Still under test broadcast)

== See also ==
- DZRJ-DTV
- Rajah Broadcasting Network
