= DYAR =

Radio station in Cebu City, Philippines

Sonshine Radio Cebu (DYAR)
Mandaue; Philippines
- Broadcast area: Central Visayas and surrounding areas
- Frequency: 765 kHz
- Branding: DYAR 765 Sonshine Radio Cebu

Programming
- Languages: Cebuano, Filipino
- Format: Silent
- Network: Sonshine Radio

Ownership
- Owner: Nation Broadcasting Corporation (1969-2005); Swara Sug Media Corporation (2005-2023)

History
- First air date: 1969 (as NBC DYCB); 1998 (as DYAR Angel Radyo); March 2005 (as DYAR Sonshine Radio)
- Last air date: December 2023 (NTC suspension order)
- Former call signs: DYCB (1969–1998)
- Former frequencies: 760 kHz (1969–1978)
- Call sign meaning: Angel Radyo (former branding under NBC); Alternatibong Radyo

Technical information
- Licensing authority: NTC
- Class: B
- Power: 10,000 watts
- ERP: 30,000 watts

Links
- Webcast: Live Stream

DYAR (765 AM) Sonshine Radio was a radio station owned and operated by Swara Sug Media Corporation. The station's studio is located at KJC Compound, North Rd., Brgy, Jagobiao, Mandaue, and its transmitter is located at Brgy. Cogon Pardo, Cebu City.

On mid-December 2023, the station, along with the rest of the network, had its operations suspended by the National Telecommunications Commission for 30 days, through an order dated December 19 but was publicized two days later, in response to a House of Representatives resolution, in relation to the alleged franchise violations.
