= Vimcontu Broadcasting Corporation =

Philippine radio network

- Type: Private
- Industry: Broadcast
- Founded: June 19, 1965
- Headquarters: Cebu City, Philippines
- Key people: Gerard Seno (President & CEO)
- Owner: Visayas-Mindanao Confederation of Trade Unions

Vimcontu Broadcasting Corporation is a Philippine radio network of the Visayas-Mindanao Confederation of Trade Unions, a trade union organization under the Associated Labor Unions (ALU) through the Trade Union Congress of the Philippines. Its corporate office is located at the 2nd Floor, JSU-PSU Mariners' Court-Cebu, ALU-VIMCONTU Welfare Center, Pier 1, Cebu City.

== Vimcontu Stations ==
=== AM Stations ===
Callsign	Frequency	Location
DYLA	909 kHz	Cebu City

=== FM Stations ===
Branding	Callsign	Frequency	Location	Operator
FM Radio Cebu	DYWF	93.1 MHz	Cebu City	Philippine Collective Media Corporation
Hug Radio	DYJS	93.3 MHz	Bogo	—N/a
Bee FM	DYII	92.7 MHz	Tagbilaran	Groove Deejayz Entertainment Solutions

=== Former stations ===
Callsign	Frequency	Location	Status
DYPC	88.7 MHz	Mandaue	Non-renewal of permit.
