= DYRF-AM =

Radio station in Cebu City, Philippines

Radio Fuerza (DYRF)
- Cebu City; Philippines
- Broadcast area: Central Visayas and surrounding areas
- Frequency: 1215 kHz
- Branding: DYRF Radio Fuerza 1215

Programming
- Languages: Cebuano, Filipino
- Format: News, Public Affairs, Talk, Religious Radio
- Affiliations: Catholic Media Network

Ownership
- Owner: Word Broadcasting Corporation
- Sister stations: 89.1 Juander Radyo

History
- First air date: 1968
- Former frequencies: 1270 kHz (1968–1978)
- Call sign meaning: Radio Fuerza

Technical information
- Licensing authority: NTC
- Power: 10,000 watts
- ERP: 32,000 watts

Links
- Webcast: Listen Live
- Website: Official Website

DYRF (1215 AM) Radio Fuerza is a radio station owned and operated by Word Broadcasting Corporation. The station's studio is located at Ground Floor, Dingman Bldg., University of San Carlos Downtown Campus, P. del Rosario St. Cebu City, and its transmitter is located at Guinabsan, Brgy. Basak San Nicolas, Cebu City.
