= DYKC =

Radio station in Cebu City, Philippines

Radyo Ronda Cebu (DYKC)
- Mandaue; Philippines
- Broadcast area: Central Visayas and surrounding areas
- Frequency: 675 kHz
- Branding: RPN DYKC Radyo Ronda

Programming
- Languages: Cebuano, Filipino
- Format: News, Public Affairs, Talk, Drama
- Network: Radyo Ronda

Ownership
- Owner: Radio Philippines Network
- Sister stations: DYKC-TV (RPTV)

History
- First air date: 1965
- Former call signs: DYBC (1965–1972)
- Former frequencies: 660 kHz (1965–1975); 1260 kHz (1975–1978)
- Call sign meaning: Kanlaon Cebu; Kusog Cebu

Technical information
- Licensing authority: NTC
- Power: 10,000 watts

Links
- Webcast: https://tunein.rpnradio.com/cebu
- Website: https://rpnradio.com/dykc-cebu

DYKC (675 AM) Radyo Ronda is a radio station owned and operated by the Radio Philippines Network. The station's studio is located inside the SMC Warehouse Compound, A. del Rosario, Tipolo, Mandaue, while its transmitter is located at Brgy. Suba Basbas, Lapu-Lapu City. DYKC is the pioneer AM radio station in Cebu.

== History ==
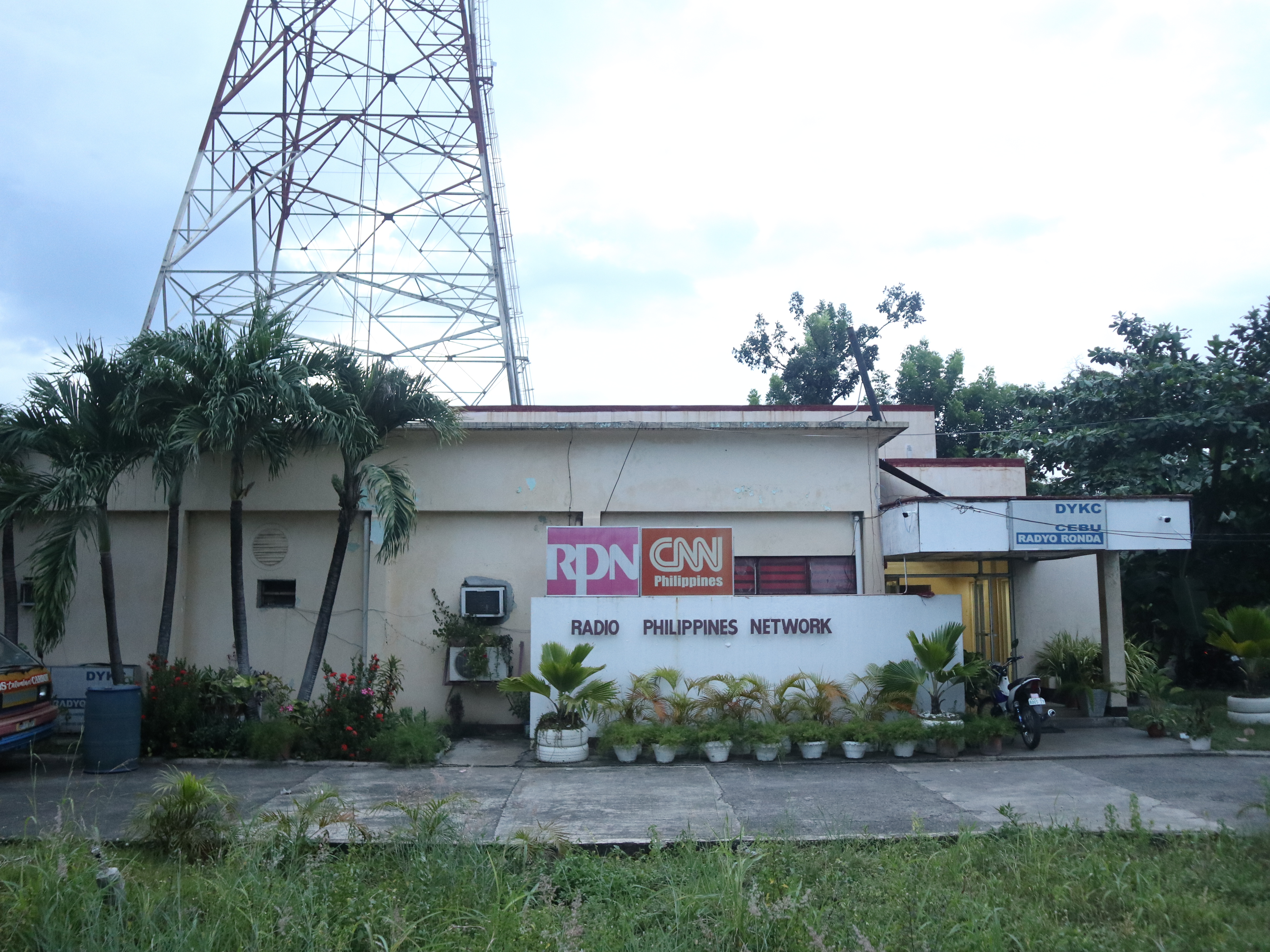
The station's former studio in Maguikay, Mandaue.

The station was established in 1965 under the ownership of Visayan Broadcasting Network of Eduardo Lopez and Co. It initially bared the call letters DYBC and was broadcasting on 660 kHz. It was first located at Filomelia Bldg. in Cebu City.

On October 28, 1969, Kanlaon Broadcasting System (now known as the Radio Philippines Network) took over the station's operations. In 1972, KBS fully acquired the station. To reflect the change, the station changed its call letters to DYKC. It moved its operations to Brgy. Maguikay, Mandaue and its transmitter facilities to Brgy. Opao. It is the only radio station in Cebu whose operations were not disrupted during the Martial Law period.

In 1975, DYKC transferred to 1260 kHz. On November 23, 1978, DYKC transferred to 675 kHz, in response to the adoption of the 9 kHz spacing on AM radio stations in the Philippines under the Geneva Frequency Plan of 1975.

In 2024, DYKC moved to its current home inside the SMC Warehouse Compound.
