= DYAM-FM =

Hope Radio Toledo (DYAM)
Toledo, Cebu; Philippines
- Broadcast area: Cebu
- Frequency: 106.3 MHz
- Branding: 106.3 Hope Radio

Programming
- Format: Religious Radio

Ownership
- Owner: Adventist Media; (Digital Broadcasting Corporation)

History
- First air date: August 17, 2019

Technical information
- Power: 1 kW
- ERP: 5 kW

106.3 Hope Radio (DYAM 106.3 MHz) is an FM station owned and operated by Adventist Media. Its studios and transmitter are located at Brgy. Luray II, Toledo, Cebu.
