= DYRB =

Radio station in Cebu City, Philippines

Radyo Pilipino Cebu (DYRB)
- Cebu City; Philippines
- Broadcast area: Central Visayas and surrounding areas
- Frequency: 540 kHz
- Branding: DYRB 540 Radyo Pilipino

Programming
- Languages: Cebuano, Filipino
- Format: News, Public Affairs, Talk
- Network: Radyo Pilipino

Ownership
- Owner: Radyo Pilipino Corporation; (Radio Audience Developers Integrated Organization, Inc.)

History
- First air date: 1970
- Former names: Radyo Bisaya; Radyo Balita; Radyo Asenso
- Call sign meaning: Radyo Bisaya (former branding)

Technical information
- Licensing authority: NTC
- Power: 10,000 watts

Links
- Website: www.radyopilipino.com

DYRB (540 AM) Radyo Pilipino is a radio station owned and operated by Radyo Pilipino Corporation through its licensee Radio Audience Developers Integrated Organization (RADIO), Inc. Its studio is located at 2nd Floor, Unit #4 M. Pacubas Dr., Brgy. Mambaling, Cebu City, and its transmitter is located at Sitio Seaside Alumnos, Brgy. Basak San Nicolas, Cebu City.

== History ==
DYRB was founded on January 1, 1970 under the ownership of Allied Broadcasting Center. It aired a music format. Back then, it was located at 479 C. Padilla St. In 1983, DYRB was acquired by the Radyo Pilipino Corporation and switched to a news and public service format. During that time, the station carried the branding Radio Bisaya and later on Radyo Balita. In 2017, the station transferred to its current location in Brgy. Mambaling. By 2020, all of RadioCorp's stations carry the Radyo Pilipino branding.
