= DYKI =

Radio station in Cebu City, Philippines

MemoRieS FM Cebu (DYKI)
- Cebu City; Philippines
- Broadcast area: Metro Cebu and surrounding areas
- Frequency: 89.9 MHz
- RDS: MemoRieS
- Branding: 89.9 MemoRieS FM

Programming
- Language: English
- Format: Classic Hits; OPM
- Network: MemoRieS FM

Ownership
- Owner: Primax Broadcasting Network

History
- First air date: 1998
- Former names: K-Lite (1998); K89.9 (1999); Smooth FM (2000-2017)
- Call sign meaning: Kiss

Technical information
- Licensing authority: NTC
- Class: CDE
- Power: 10,000 watts
- ERP: 32,000 watts

Links
- Webcast: Listen live (via TuneIn)

DYKI (89.9 FM), broadcasting as 89.9 MemoRieS FM, is a radio station owned and operated by Primax Broadcasting Network. Its studios and transmitter facilities are located at the Suite 106, Vacation Hotel Cebu, #35 Juana Osmena St, Cebu City.

== History ==
The station was established in 1998 as K-Lite 89.9 with an Alternative rock format. It became an affiliate of Raven Broadcasting Corporation. The following year, it was rebranded as K89.9. In 2002, the station severed ties with RBC and rebranded as Smooth FM 89.9. It switched to a smooth jazz format with the tagline "Your Life, Your Music". In late January 2017, Smooth FM quietly signed off for the last time and went off the air for a week.

In March 2017, the station was rebranded as 89.9 MemoRieS FM with a classic hits format. It was an affiliate of the Radio Mindanao Network until 2025.
