= DYMX =

Radio station in Cebu City, Philippines

Star FM Cebu (DYMX)

Cebu City; Philippines
- Broadcast area: Metro Cebu and surrounding areas
- Frequency: 95.5 MHz
- RDS: 1. It's All; 2. For You
- Branding: 95.5 Star FM

Programming
- Languages: English, Cebuano, Filipino
- Format: Contemporary MOR, OPM, News
- Network: Star FM

Ownership
- Owner: Bombo Radyo Philippines; (People's Broadcasting Service, Inc.)
- Sister stations: DYMF Bombo Radyo

History
- First air date: May 25, 1994
- Call sign meaning: Mix

Technical information
- Licensing authority: NTC
- Class: C, D, E
- Power: 25,000 watts
- ERP: 30,000 watts
- Transmitter coordinates: 10°18′58.72″N 123°53′11.9″E

Links
- Webcast: Listen Live
- Website: Star FM Cebu

DYMX (95.5 FM), broadcasting as 95.5 Star FM, is a radio station owned and operated by Bombo Radyo Philippines through its licensee People's Broadcasting Service, Inc. Its studio, offices and transmitter are located at the CBS Bldg., 140 M. Velez St., Guadalupe, Cebu City. It operates daily from 5:00 AM to 9:30 PM.

== History ==
Star FM began operations on May 25, 1994, a month after Bombo Radyo rebranded all 17 of its FM stations under that name. It initially operated with a power of 25,000 watts, covering the Central Visayas region and portions of Western and Eastern Visayas. In less than a year, Star FM was ranked by the Radio Research Council as the #1 FM radio station in the city. It remained at the top until 1999, when its rival station 90.7 Energy FM (now Brigada News FM) took over the top spot, a position it held until 2002.

Star FM was the first FM radio station in Metro Cebu to use audio cassette tapes and compact discs for playing songs and recorded segments. Among its notable programs were It's All For You (every morning, afternoon and evening), Twilight Zone, Star Sweep (every weekday,) Never on Sunday, Superstar Sunday and Sunday Disco Recall (every Sunday).

In April 2006, on its 12th anniversary, Star FM was relaunched with a new logo and the slogan, "Iba Ang Dating". A few years later, the station reduced its power to 10,000 watts.

In 2013, Star FM adopted the new slogan “Like Mo, Share Mo.” On February 3, 2014, Bombo Network News began simulcasting on several Star FM stations as well as Bombo Radyo stations, thus allowing the station to add news and talk programming to its format. The network's flagship national newscast was made to compete with the longer-established rival Brigada News FM, a news and music FM station owned by Brigada Mass Media Corporation.

In the first quarter of 2016, Star FM's provincial stations began using the slogan “It's All For You,” this time with a stronger emphasis on music. A few months later, the station began broadcasting 24/7, a schedule that continued until 2018. From September 2016 to January 2018, Star FM operated with a transmitting power of 5,000 watts stereo, but with a limited coverage area.

On January 18, 2018, after installing new transmitting equipment on the rooftop of the CBS Building, Star FM upgraded its power to a newly improved 25,000 watts stereo, resulting in a clearer signal in Central Visayas and Southern Leyte. Also in 2018, several Star FM stations licensed to Consolidated Broadcasting System transferred its licensee to People's Broadcasting Service, after the former's license were not renewed. In 2019, due to financial problems, Star FM reduced its daily broadcast schedule from 24 hours to 19 hours, signing off at 11:00 PM.

In March 2020, “The Holy Rosary” began simulcasting on all Bombo Radyo and Star FM stations nationwide, following the extension of the community quarantine regulations due to the COVID-19 in the Philippines. The station also reduced its broadcasting hours, signing off between 9:00 and 9:30pm.

Following the aftermath of Typhoon Rai (Odette) on the evening of December 16, 2021, Star FM simulcast with its sister station, Bombo Radyo, providing updates on the typhoon's impact in Cebu, Bohol and Leyte. The following day, DYMF went off the air after its transmitter was destroyed by the typhoon. Subsequently, several of DYMF's programs began airing on Star FM, operating temporarily under the name Bombo Radyo Star FM. On February 15, 2022, Star FM reverted to its original programming after DYMF, whose new transmitter equipment had been installed the day before, resumed operations.
