= DYCM =

Radio station in Cebu City, Philippines

- Cebu City; Philippines
- Broadcast area: Central Visayas and surrounding areas
- Frequency: 1152 kHz
- Branding: DYCM

Programming
- Languages: Cebuano, Filipino
- Format: News, Public Affairs, Talk
- Affiliations: DotTV

Ownership
- Owner: Makati Broadcasting Company

History
- First air date: 1989
- Call sign meaning: Celestino Martinez

Technical information
- Licensing authority: NTC
- Power: 10,000 watts
- Repeater: Bogo: 100.5 MHz

Links
- Website: http://www.dycmcebu.com/

DYCM (1152 AM) is a radio station owned and operated by Makati Broadcasting Company. Its main studio is located at Room 201, 2/F Dona Luisa Bldg., Fuente Osmena, Cebu City, and its transmitter is located in Brgy. Tayud, Consolacion.

== History ==
DYCM was founded in 1989 under the ownership of Masbate Community Broadcasting Corporation. It was formerly located at Brgy. Taytayan, Bogo, Cebu. It initially bagged the names "Kaabag sa Banikanhon Kaugmaran", "Kaabag sa Serbisyo" and "Bag-ong Adlaw - Cebu Del Norte".

In early 2014, it went off the air and its ownership was transferred to Makati Broadcasting Company, a media outlet owned by former Bogo Mayor Celestino Martinez. DYCM was relaunched on July 8, 2014, this time in Cebu City. It also launched its relay station in its old location.

In February 2026, DYCM formed a joint-venture agreement with DotTV, an upstart digital media group led by its chairman/CEO and former news anchor Niño Padilla, dubbed as DYCM.tv.

== Incidents ==
On September 27, 2026, DYCM station manager Sam Costanilla was found dead.
