= DYFR =

Radio station in Cebu City, Philippines

UP 987 (DYFR)
- Cebu City; Philippines
- Broadcast area: Metro Cebu and surrounding areas
- Frequency: 98.7 MHz
- RDS: UP987
- Branding: UP 987

Programming
- Languages: English, Cebuano, Filipino, Hokkien (Chinese programming)
- Format: CCM, Religious Radio

Ownership
- Owner: Far East Broadcasting Company

History
- First air date: October 12, 1975
- Call sign meaning: Far East

Technical information
- Licensing authority: NTC
- Class: A, B, C
- Power: 10,000 watts
- ERP: 25,000 watts

Links
- Website: http://dyfr.febc.ph/

DYFR (98.7 FM), broadcasting as UP 987, is a radio station owned and operated by the Far East Broadcasting Company. The station's studio and transmitter are located at the Immanuel Bible College Compound, Banawa Hills, Cebu City.
