= DYMF =

Radio station in Cebu City, Philippines

Bombo Radyo Cebu (DYMF)
- Cebu City; Philippines
- Broadcast area: Metro Cebu and surrounding areas
- Frequency: 963 kHz
- Branding: DYMF Bombo Radyo

Programming
- Languages: Cebuano, Filipino
- Format: News, Public Affairs, Talk, Drama
- Network: Bombo Radyo

Ownership
- Owner: Bombo Radyo Philippines; (People's Broadcasting Service, Inc.)
- Sister stations: 95.5 Star FM

History
- First air date: 1978
- Former frequencies: 648 kHz (1978–1991)
- Call sign meaning: Marcelino Florete

Technical information
- Licensing authority: NTC
- Power: 10,000 watts
- Transmitter coordinates: 10°17′18″N 123°52′50″E

Links
- Webcast: Listen Live
- Website: Bombo Radyo Cebu

DYMF (963 AM) Bombo Radyo is a radio station owned and operated by Bombo Radyo Philippines through its licensee People's Broadcasting Service, Inc. Its studio and business offices are located at Bombo Radyo Broadcast Center, 87-A Borromeo St., Brgy. Pahina Central, Cebu City, while its transmitter is located at Sitio Alaska, Brgy. Mambaling, Cebu City.

DYMF was formerly the home of the Bombo Radyo Production Center. Cebu's Extremes Travel & Entertainment Provider (Cebu City) Corp. formerly supplied Cebuano dramas to the station from its inception in 2009 until 2025, when most of its talents retired. Bombo Radyo Drama Center currently supplies centralized national drama programming to selected Bombo Radyo stations across Luzon, Visayas and Mindanao.

== History ==
Bombo Radyo was inaugurated in 1978 on 648 kHz. Bobby Nalzaro, whose transferred to Cebu in 1987, serving as its acting station manager for ten years until he resigned in 1997 to joined GMA Cebu. In 1991, the station swapped frequencies with DYRC's 963 kHz. DYMF used to air NBA games through a partnership deal in the same year.

Bombo Radyo went off the air on December 16, 2021, after its transmitter was destroyed by Typhoon Rai (Odette). During the time being, several of its programs were aired on its sister station under the interim name Bombo Radyo Star FM. It resumed operations on February 16, 2022, this time with a newly installed transmitter.
