= DYRK =

Radio station in Cebu City, Philippines

WRocK (DYRK)
Cebu City; Philippines
- Broadcast area: Metro Cebu and surrounding areas
- Frequency: 96.3 MHz
- RDS: WRocK
- Branding: 96.3 WRocK

Programming
- Language: English
- Format: Soft AC, OPM

Ownership
- Owner: Exodus Broadcasting Company, Inc.

History
- First air date: October 2, 1993
- Call sign meaning: "Rock"

Technical information
- Licensing authority: NTC
- Class: A/B/C
- Power: 10,000 watts
- ERP: 75,000 watts

Links
- Webcast: Listen live (via TuneIn)
- Website: www.963wrock.com

DYRK (96.3 FM), broadcasting as 96.3 WRocK, is a radio station owned and operated by Exodus Broadcasting Company, Inc.. The station's studio and transmitter are located at Room 2016, 20th Floor, Golden Peak Hotel and Suites, Gorordo Ave. cor. Escario St., Brgy. Camputhaw, Cebu City. It operates daily from 5:00 am to 12:00 mn on terrestrial radio, and 24/7 online.

== Background ==
Exodus Broadcasting Company, Inc. was established by the Hodreal family on October 2, 1993, and operated as a sister company of ACWS-UBN. It launched WRocK in Cebu province.

On October 6, 2008, it was announced that the Elizalde Group of Companies' Manila Broadcasting Company (MBC) purchased the Manila station DWRK from the Hodreal family, owners of ACWS-UBN and Exodus, for ₱229.6 million. Except for the acquisition price, further terms were not disclosed. While DWRK since then has been under the control of MBC, Exodus Broadcasting Company retained control of its provincial stations and the WRocK name. In the same year, the Hodreal group decided to re-establish the original WRocK format via online streaming, branding it as "WRocK Online" through Hayag.com, while DYRK was relaunched as a separate entity from WRocK Online.

In 2015, a new group of investors acquired ACWS-UBN from the Hodreal group.

By June 2016, the station is the sole station bearing the WRocK brand.

== See also ==
- WRocK Online
