= Word Broadcasting Corporation =

Philippine radio network

- Type: Private
- Industry: Broadcast
- Founded: March 24, 1968
- Founder: Julio Rosales
- Headquarters: Cebu City, Philippines
- Key people: Engineer Ruben Virtucio General Manager
- Owner: Society of the Divine Word - Philippine Southern Province
- Website: https://www.svdphs.ph/Word-Broadcasting-Corporation https://www.wordbroadcastingcorporation.org/

Word Broadcasting Corporation (also known as Filipinas Broadcasting Association, Inc.) is a Philippine radio network. Its corporate office is located at University of San Carlos, Downtown Campus, Corner. P. del Rosario St. Cebu City.

Originally founded by the local division of the Congregation of the Most Holy Redeemer, it is operated by the Society of the Divine Word's Philippine Southern Province division since 1979. It is currently an affiliate of Catholic Media Network.

In 2025, its FM stations in Cebu and Ormoc entered an airtime lease agreement with RSV Broadcasting Network and both rebranded as Juander Radyo.

== Stations ==
=== AM stations ===
Branding	Call-Sign	Frequency	Location
Radio Fuerza	DYRF-AM	1215 kHz	Cebu

=== FM stations ===
The following stations are operated by RSV Broadcasting Network.

Branding	Call-Sign	Frequency	Location
Juander Radyo Cebu	DYDW-FM	89.1 MHz	Cebu
Juander Radyo Ormoc	DYAJ-FM	90.3 MHz	Ormoc

=== Former stations ===
Call-Sign	Frequency	Location	Status
DYDW-AM	531 kHz	Tacloban	Off the air since November 8, 2013.
