= Love Radio =

Broadcast radio network in the Philippines

- Type: Broadcast radio network
- Country: Philippines
- Headquarters: MBC Building, Star City Complex, Pasay

Programming
- Language(s): Filipino (main); English and other regional languages (secondary)
- Format: Contemporary MOR, OPM
- Affiliations: Broadcast licensees within the MBC Media Group: Cebu Broadcasting Company; Pacific Broadcasting System; Philippine Broadcasting Corporation

Ownership
- Owner: MBC Media Group

History
- Founded: February 14, 1975

Coverage
- Availability: Nationwide

Links
- Webcast: loveradio.com.ph/radio
- Website: loveradio.com.ph

Love Radio is a broadcast FM radio network in the Philippines owned by MBC Media Group. Its headquarters are located at Cultural Center of the Philippine Complex, Pasay, Manila. The network's original format is easy-listening from 1975 until 2000 when Love Radio shifted to Contemporary MOR or more popularly known as the masa format.

Its flagship station is DZMB in Metro Manila (licensed to Cebu Broadcasting Company), which has been rated as #1 in the FM radio ratings for 16 years (from 2002 to 2017), according to the KBP's Radio Research Council Surveys and AC Nielsen Car Survey.

== History ==
Love Radio was previously known by its call letters DZMB (previously broadcasting under call letters KZMB until 1948) when it began broadcasts on the FM band in 1975 from its first broadcast days on the AM band. Back then, it played mainstream pop, later relegating to easy listening music. As DZMB, it also introduced and institutionalized the deep-voiced radio announcers. In the 1980s, Manuelito F. Luzon, then station manager of DZMB, conceptualized the station's branding identity.

In the 2000s, Love Radio was reformatted to a contemporary masa, a format that was trending on the landscape of FM radio in the country which was started by rival stations since the dawn of the new millennium.

== See also ==
- MBC Media Group
