= DYRC =

Radio station in Cebu City, Philippines

Aksyon Radyo Cebu (DYRC)
- Cebu City; Philippines
- Broadcast area: Central Visayas and surrounding areas
- Frequency: 648 KHz
- Branding: DYRC Aksyon Radyo 648

Programming
- Languages: Cebuano, Filipino
- Format: News, Public Affairs, Talk

Ownership
- Owner: MBC Media Group
- Sister stations: DZRH Cebu, 91.5 Yes FM, 97.9 Love Radio, 102.7 Easy Rock, Radyo Natin Pinamugajan, DYBU-DTV 43

History
- First air date: January 7, 1929 (as KZRC); September 21, 1940 (as DYRC)
- Former call signs: KZRC (1929–1948); DYXR (1999–2010)
- Former frequencies: 600 kHz (1929–1978); 963 kHz (1978–1991)
- Call sign meaning: Radyo Cebu

Technical information
- Licensing authority: NTC
- Class: B
- Power: 10,000 watts
- ERP: 20,000 watts

Links
- Website: https://aksyonradyo.mbcmediagroup.com

DYRC (648 AM) Aksyon Radyo is a radio station owned and operated by MBC Media Group. The station's studio is located at Eggling Subd., Busay, Cebu City and its transmitter is located at Brgy. Tangke, Talisay, Cebu.

== History ==
DYRC began as KZRC (Radio Cebu), first established by the Radio Corporation of the Philippines (RCP) in Cebu City in 1929; the first radio station in Cebu province and the pioneer of provincial radio broadcasting. Had a one kilowatt power, it was used to be a relay of KZRM in Manila for a few months in an unsuccessful experiment. In 1931, RCP, which halted its operations, sold its stations to department store operator Erlanger and Galinger.

KZRC resumed its operations in 1940 after being bought by another department store, H. E. Heacock Co. of Samuel Gaches, becoming a sister station to KZRH in Manila, and returned its Cebuano broadcast. It broadcast from the top floor of Gotiaoco Building, owned by Chinese trader Pedro Gotiaoco which also housed the local branch of Heacock's. Its station manager, Harry Fenton, would later become a guerrilla leader during the Japanese occupation of the Philippines. It was the only commercial radio station in the city, yet short-lived again, prior to the Second World War when it was used as the mouthpiece of the guerilla movement.

The station was later bought by Isaac Beck, who, after the war, sold the station to the Elizaldes which owned Manila Broadcasting Company (MBC). The station, eventually renamed DYRC, was opened by an MBC subsidiary Cebu Broadcasting Company on September 21, 1947, debuting the post-war provincial radio broadcast.

Later that year, at that time it was the most listened to station, DYRC produced its first female voice announcer, Ginny Peralta Vamenta. DYRC carried the slogan "The Voice of Cebu" until prior to the period of nationwide martial law.

Vamenta and Henry Halasan topped the bill in prime time broadcasting. Some famous personalities aired on DYRC were Nene Pimentel, Former Congressman Antonio Cuenco, Asia's Queen of Songs Pilita Corrales, veteran broadcaster Angelo Castro Sr., Former DILG Undersecretary Inday Nita Cortez Daluz, Arch. Angel Lagdameo, lawyer Jane Paredes, among others. Star Cebuano singers featured in DYRC were: Josie Lauron, Josephine Ferrer, Stacs Huguete, and child singer Amapola Cabase popularly known as Amapola, to name a few. Bandleaders and pianists leading the DYRC-DYBU bands were Emilio Villareal and Manny Cabase.

In September 11 1972, the station along with DYBU went off the air, due to martial law under Ferdinand Marcos.

In 1973, it returned on air under the new management as a local outlet of Sunshine City. In 1978, the frequency migrated to 963 kHz under the NARBA to GE75. In 1991, the station swapped frequencies with DYMF's 648 kHz and was relaunched as Radyo Balita.

On January 4, 1999, Padayon Pilipino Media Consultancy Services Inc. took over the management of the station and changed its call sign to DYXR. This marks the birth of Aksyon Radyo. Back then, its studios were located in Brgy. Tangke, Talisay, Cebu. In August 2010, the station went off the air and Padayon Pilipino's management migrated its operations to the United States under Aksyon Radyo's US News Bureau division.

Logo of DYRC Aksyon Radyo Cebu from 2010 to 2021

On September 21, 2010, BisaLog Broadcasting (owned by lawyer/host Rhina Seco, DZRH-Aksyon Radyo News Bureau Manila's Niño Padilla, and Aksyon Radyo Program Director Ed Montilla) took over the management of the station and brought back its original callsign DYRC as part of its 70th anniversary. It moved to Unit 301 Doña Luisa Building, Fuente Osmeña. At the same time, DYRC launched "Dangpanan", the local version of DZRH's "Operation Tulong" that offers free medical, dental and legal services to the needy; as well as a music format on Sundays.

In the wake of the canonization of Pedro Calungsod in 2012, DYRC adopted a temporary branding Radyo Calungsod.

In May 2018, Manila Broadcasting Company and RJR Media Solutions took over the operations of DYRC with Atty. Rudolph Steve E Jularbal as its Station Manager (who also happens to be the station manager of DYRC's parent station, DZRH). Months later, the station moved to its current studios in GD Uyfang Building. The present DYRC Station OIC is Rodolfo "Dodie Ladrera Jr.

On November 15, 2021, Aksyon Radyo along with sister stations launched their new logos and its new corporate slogan, Sama-Sama Tayo, Pilipino! (lit. transl. Let's Get Together, Filipinos!).
