= DYLA =

Radio station in Cebu City, Philippines

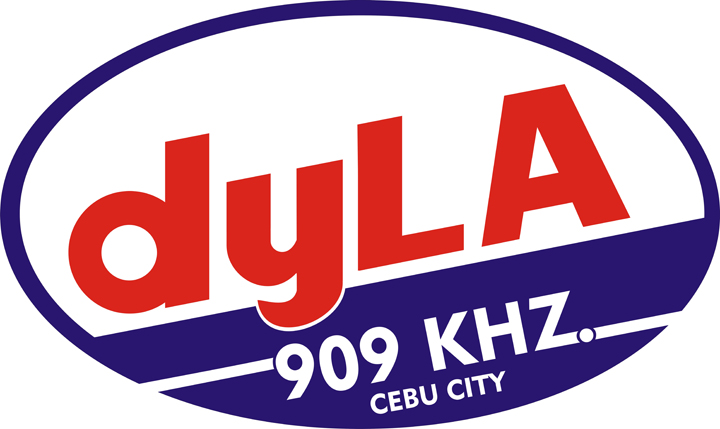
- Cebu City; Philippines
- Broadcast area: Central Visayas and surrounding areas
- Frequency: 909 kHz
- Branding: DYLA 909

Programming
- Languages: Cebuano, Filipino
- Format: News, Public Affairs, Talk

Ownership
- Owner: Vimcontu Broadcasting Corporation
- Sister stations: FM Radio 93.1 (operated by PCMC)

History
- First air date: September 27, 1967
- Former frequencies: 1505 kHz (1967–1978); 1476 kHz (1978–1988)

Technical information
- Licensing authority: NTC
- Power: 10,000 watts

Links
- Website: dyla909cebu.com

DYLA (909 AM) is a radio station owned and operated by Vimcontu Broadcasting Corporation, the broadcast arm of the Visayas-Mindanao Confederation of Trade Unions. The station's studio is located at 2nd Floor, JSU-PSU Mariners' Court-Cebu, ALU-VIMCONTU Welfare Center, Pier 1, Cebu City, and its transmitter is located at Alumnos, Brgy. Mambaling, Cebu City.

== History ==
In December 1984, DYLA broadcaster Vicente Villordan was assassinated by gunmen shortly after his morning program. On the evening of June 1, 1985, DYLA broadcaster Nabocodonosor "Nabing" Velez was watching a beauty pageant where his daughter was competing when he was assassinated by motorcycle-riding gunmen at point-blank range.

== Former anchors ==
- Leo Lastimosa
- Cerge Remonde†
