= DYRR =

Radyo Natin Pinamungajan (DYRR)
- Pinamungajan; Philippines
- Broadcast area: Western Cebu
- Frequency: 103.9 MHz
- Branding: 103.9 Radyo Natin

Programming
- Languages: Cebuano, Filipino
- Format: Community radio
- Network: Radyo Natin

Ownership
- Owner: MBC Media Group

History
- First air date: January 30, 1997

Technical information
- Licensing authority: NTC
- Power: 1 kW
- ERP: 5 kW

103.9 Radyo Natin (DYRR 103.9 MHz) is an FM station owned and operated by MBC Media Group. Its studios and transmitter are located in Purok 1, Brgy. Buhingtubig, Pinamungajan.
