= MBC Media Group =

Philippine media company

Manila Broadcasting Company

- MBC Media Group Headquarters in Pasay, Philippines
- Trade name: MBC Media Group
- Type: Public
- Traded as: PSE: MBC
- Industry: Mass media
- Founded: June 12, 1946; 80 years ago (SEC Registration No. 1674)
- Founders: Federico Elizalde; Joaquín Miguel Elizalde; Manolo Elizalde; Manuel Elizalde
- Headquarters: MMG Building, Star City, V. Sotto St., CCP Complex, Roxas Boulevard, Pasay, Metro Manila, Philippines
- Area served: Worldwide
- Key people: Fred J. Elizalde (Chairman); Ruperto Nicdao Jr., (President and CEO); Juan Manuel Elizalde, (Vice-President for Operations)
- Brands: DZRH; DZRHTV; Love Radio; Yes! FM; Easy Rock; Aksyon Radyo; Radyo Natin
- Services: Radio and television broadcasting, Digital media
- Revenue: ▲PHP1.1 billion (FY 2020)
- Operating income: ▲PHP168.7 million (FY 2020)
- Net income: ▼PHP94.3 million (FY 2020)
- Total assets: ▲PHP2.6 trillion (FY 2020)
- Total equity: ▲PHP1.4 trillion (FY 2020)
- Owners: Elizalde Holdings Corporation (34.7%); Elizalde Land, Inc. (21.6%); Other (17.4%) Public stock (26.3%)
- Number of employees: 216 (FY 2025)
- Parent: FJE Group of Companies
- Divisions: MBC Radio; MBC TV; MBC Digital; MBC Events; MBC Promos; MBC Talents
- Subsidiaries: see list
- Website: mbcmediagroup.com

The Manila Broadcasting Company (MBC), doing business as MBC Media Group, is a Philippine multimedia company that is owned by the FJE Group of Companies of Fred J. Elizalde, which also operates hotels and Pasay-based amusement park, Star City. MBC operates DZRH, the second-oldest radio station in the country, and five other national radio brands spread across several cities and provinces, including Aksyon Radyo, Love Radio, Yes FM, Easy Rock, and Radyo Natin. MBC Media Group's corporate headquarters and studios are located at the MMG Building inside the Star City amusement park at the CCP Complex, V. Sotto St., Pasay, Metro Manila.

MBC Media Group currently focuses on six business ventures namely, terrestrial radio, television (digital and pay TV), digital media, events, on-air and on-ground promotions and talent management for its roster of Radio DJs.

== History ==
=== The Heacock era ===
The origins of MBC can be traced to DZRH, which first went on air as KZRH on the morning of July 15, 1939, by the Heacock Company, a prominent department store based in Escolta Street, Binondo, Manila. Years later, it bought KZRC (now DYRC) from Isaac Beck in Cebu City. The Japanese took over the stations and KZRH became PIAM (Philippine Islands AM) for their propaganda use.

=== The birth of MBC and DZRH ===
After World War II, the Elizalde brothers (Federico "Fred", Joaquin Miguel "Mike" and Manuel "Manolo") took over KZRH and KYRC. With the help of station manager Bertrand Silen, KZRH transferred its operations to the Insular Life Building in Plaza Cervantes. On June 12, 1946, the Elizaldes established the network under the Manila Broadcasting Company (MBC).

KZRH returned to the airwaves on July 1, 1946. At the same day, MBC launched KZMB. On July 4, 1946, it aired the live coverage of the Philippine independence from the United States and the inauguration of the third Philippine Republic.

In 1948, after the international telecommunications conference in the United States where the Philippines changed its first letter to "D", KZRH changed its callsign to DZRH (with the station expanded to over 30 stations nationwide) while KZMB changed also its callsign to DZMB.

In 1949, DZRH began airing the first radio drama, Gulong ng Palad. At the same year, MBC launched its another radio station, DZPI (the station was then renamed as DWIZ in 1972, until it was later sold to Aliw Broadcasting Corporation in 1991).

Ben Aniceto began his long media career, working with DZRH, DZMB, and DZPI as a radio talent.

In 1956, MBC moved to its own Radio Center along Taft Avenue in Ermita, Manila. In the same year, Philippine radio gained popularity and AM radio became lucrative in what was considered as the golden years.

=== 1960s to Marcos dictatorship ===
On April 11, 1962, MBC (through its subsidiary, the Metropolitan Broadcasting Company) launched its TV station, DZRH-TV on VHF channel 11. A new building for the TV station was inaugurated on January 9, 1972, with President Ferdinand Marcos attending the ceremony.

When Marcos declared martial law in September 1972, MBC was temporarily closed for a few months.

In 1975, MBC ventured into the FM band when its stations DZMB and other MBC music AM stations (such as DYBU in Cebu) moved to FM radio. This would become the nucleus of MBC's Love Radio Network.

=== The expansion of MBC ===
In 1985, Manolo Elizalde retired. His son, Fred J. Elizalde, became chairman and CEO.

After the People Power Revolution ended the Marcos dictatorship in 1986, MBC began to expand its FM stations (Love Radio Network) while DZRH continued to broadcast nationwide. Ruperto Nicdao, Jr. became a board member of MBC in 1988 before he became president of MBC.

In January 1992, the application of MBC and Springs Foundation's channel 11 (DZRH-TV) to operate was denied by the National Telecommunications Commission, stating that it is "not legally, technically, and financially qualified". The channel was later acquired by Eddie Villanueva's ZOE Broadcasting Network and renamed DZOE-TV in 1998.

In 1994, DZRH relaunched itself as "One Nation, One Station" by launching the first nationwide satellite broadcast.

In July 2002, MBC studios were transferred from FJE Building in Makati to CCP Complex in Pasay.

MBC co-hosted the Aliwan Fiesta since 2003, in partnership with Cultural Center of the Philippines, and the cities of Manila and Pasay. Aliwan Fiesta is an annual event that gathers different cultural festivals of the Philippines in Star City in Pasay wherein contingents compete in dance parade and float competitions, as well as in a beauty pageant.

After 35 years, MBC returned to television with the launch of DZRH News Television on October 1, 2007.

==== Acquisitions, new networks, and changes ====
Logo used from 2002 to 2024, as Manila Broadcasting Company

In 1995, MBC acquired DWKS-FM and changed its callsign to DWST as 101.1 Showbiz Tsismis. It lasts until 1998 and relaunched as Yes FM. During the 1990s, DYRC was spun off into Aksyon Radyo, established in 11 provincial AM stations.

On December 16, 1997, MBC launched Radyo Natin. Composed of 100 FM stations strategically across the nation by using state of the art satellite technology, Radyo Natin is able to reach audiences that has never been reached before by another radio station.

In January 1999, Hot FM was launched in Dagupan, Cebu City, General Santos and Zamboanga City, with more than 50 minor provincial radio stations (under the consortium with Radyo Natin).

In October 2008, MBC acquired DWRK from ACWS-United Broadcasting Network. Seven months later in May 2009, DWRK was relaunched as Easy Rock.

In 2017, Hot FM was unofficially ceased itself as most of the remaining Hot FM stations were rebranded and switched to Radyo Natin.

In 2018, MBC began to test broadcast its TV channel DZRH News Television on digital free TV using ISDB-T in Cebu, Bacolod and Iloilo. That same year, its legislative franchise was renewed for another 25 years.

==== 2019 fire, rebranding ====
The Design Center Building in CCP Complex, Pasay, home to MBC studios and offices from 2019 to 2021

MBC main offices and studios were affected by a major fire that originated in the nearby theme park and sister company Star City on October 2, 2019. While regular programming for its AM station DZRH was suspended as a result of the fire, MBC Manila radio stations transferred its operations and broadcasts, in interim, at BSA Twin Towers, in Ortigas Center, Mandaluyong, where its FM transmitters are located. One month later on November 11, the MBC studios and offices transferred again at the Design Center of the Philippines, which is near the MBC Building.

On November 15, 2021, after a two-year hiatus, MBC studios and offices returned to the newly renovated MBC Building at the Star City Complex (which was still under rehabilitation and reconstruction), except for DZRH which would later be relocated on December 17. On the same day, MBC relaunched its new corporate slogan, Sama-Sama Tayo, Pilipino! (lit. transl. Let's be together, Filipinos!) along with the new logos of all MBC radio stations.

=== As MBC Media Group ===
On February 6, 2024, the Manila Broadcasting Company announced to adopt a new trade name as the MBC Media Group, while keeping MBC as its corporate name. The rebranding signify its diversification from broadcast media into other ventures such as digital media, events, promotions and talent management.

== Assets ==
=== Divisions ===
==== MBC Radio ====
Network	Format	Language	Year of launch	Notes
DZRH	News, talk	Tagalog	1939	MBC's flagship AM network. Flagship station is 666 AM Manila with relay stations across the country.
Love Radio	Contemporary MOR, OPM	Tagalog	1975	MBC's flagship FM network. Flagship station is 90.7 FM Manila.
Aksyon Radyo	News, talk	Tagalog; Various regional languages	1995	MBC's regional AM network. Flagship station is DYRC 648 AM Cebu.
Radyo Natin	Community radio	Tagalog; Various regional languages	1997	MBC's largest community radio network. Main feed is Radyo Natin Nationwide.
Yes FM	Contemporary MOR, OPM	Tagalog	1998	Flagship station is 101.1 FM Manila.
Easy Rock	Soft adult contemporary	English	2009	Flagship station is 96.3 FM Manila.

Defunct networks

Network	Format	Language	Year	Fate
DWIZ	Contemporary MOR, OPM, News, talk	English, Tagalog	1949–1991	Acquired by Aliw Broadcasting Corporation in 1991.
Showbiz Tsismis	Show business-centric talk radio	Tagalog	1995–1998	Replaced by Yes FM in 1998.
ComNet	Community radio	Tagalog	1990s	Replaced by Radyo Natin in 1997.
Hot FM	Community radio	Tagalog	1999–2017	Stations in Cebu, Dagupan, Cauayan and Zamboanga became part of the Yes FM network in 2014. Other stations were either disaffiliated or became part of the Radyo Natin network in the same year.

==== MBC TV ====
Network	Format	Language	Year of launch	Notes
DZRH News Television	News	Tagalog	2007	A 24/7 news channel that simulcast selected programs from MBC's flagship AM network, DZRH.

==== Others ====
- MBC Digital
- MBC Events
  - Aliwan Fiesta
  - Metro Manila Film Festival Gabi ng Parangal
- MBC Promos
- MBC Talents

=== Subsidiaries and affiliates ===
Cebu Broadcasting Company
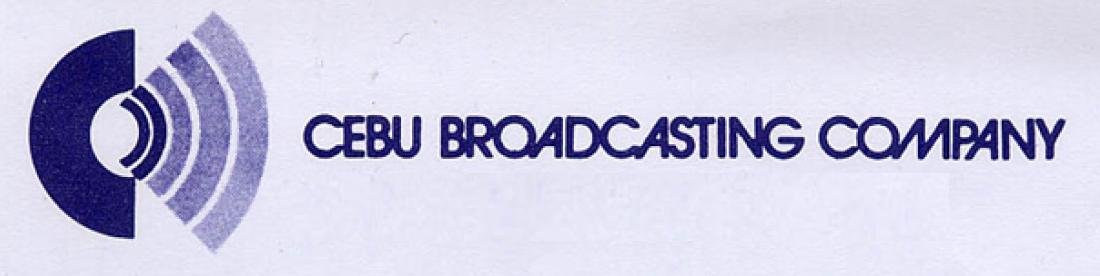
- Type: Subsidiary
- Industry: Radio network
- Founded: 1947
- Headquarters: Pasay, Philippines
- Owner: Elizalde Holdings Corporation
- Parent: MBC Media Group
- Website: mbcmediagroup.com

Philippine Broadcasting Corporation
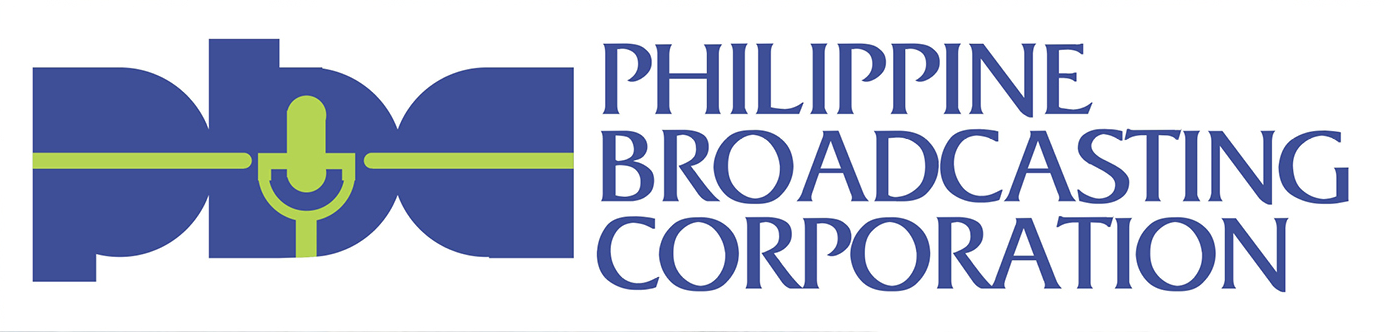
- Type: Subsidiary
- Industry: Radio network
- Founded: 1948
- Headquarters: Pasay, Philippines
- Owner: Elizalde Holdings Corporation
- Parent: MBC Media Group
- Website: mbcmediagroup.com

- Cebu Broadcasting Company
- Pacific Broadcasting System
- Philippine Broadcasting Corporation
- Operation Tulong - MBC's corporate social responsibility program.
- Elizalde Hotels and Resorts (80%)
- Star Parks Corporation
- Cultural Center of the Philippines
