= Call Me Papa Jack =

Filipino talk show

- Genre: Talk show, Radio
- Created by: TV5 Network
- Presented by: John S. Gemperle
- Country of origin: Philippines
- Original languages: Filipino; English
- No. of episodes: 18

Production
- Running time: 60 minutes

Original release
- Network: TV5
- Release: January 24 – April 19, 2015

Call Me Papa Jack is a Philippine television talk show broadcast by TV5. Hosted by John S. Gemperle (a.k.a. Papa Jack of 90.7 Love Radio), it aired from January 24 to April 19, 2015.

== Show format ==
Gemperle evaluates relationship concerns and offers love advice. He also interviews celebrities. Previous guests include Julia Clarete, Bianca King and Bret Jackson.

== See also ==
- List of TV5 (Philippine TV network) original programming
