= Tsuper =

Tsuper is a surname. Notable people with the surname include:

- Alla Tsuper (born 1979), aerial skier
- Chris Tsuper (born 1979), Filipino radio disc jockey and recording artist
