= Papa Jackson =

Filipino radio and television personality (born 1982)

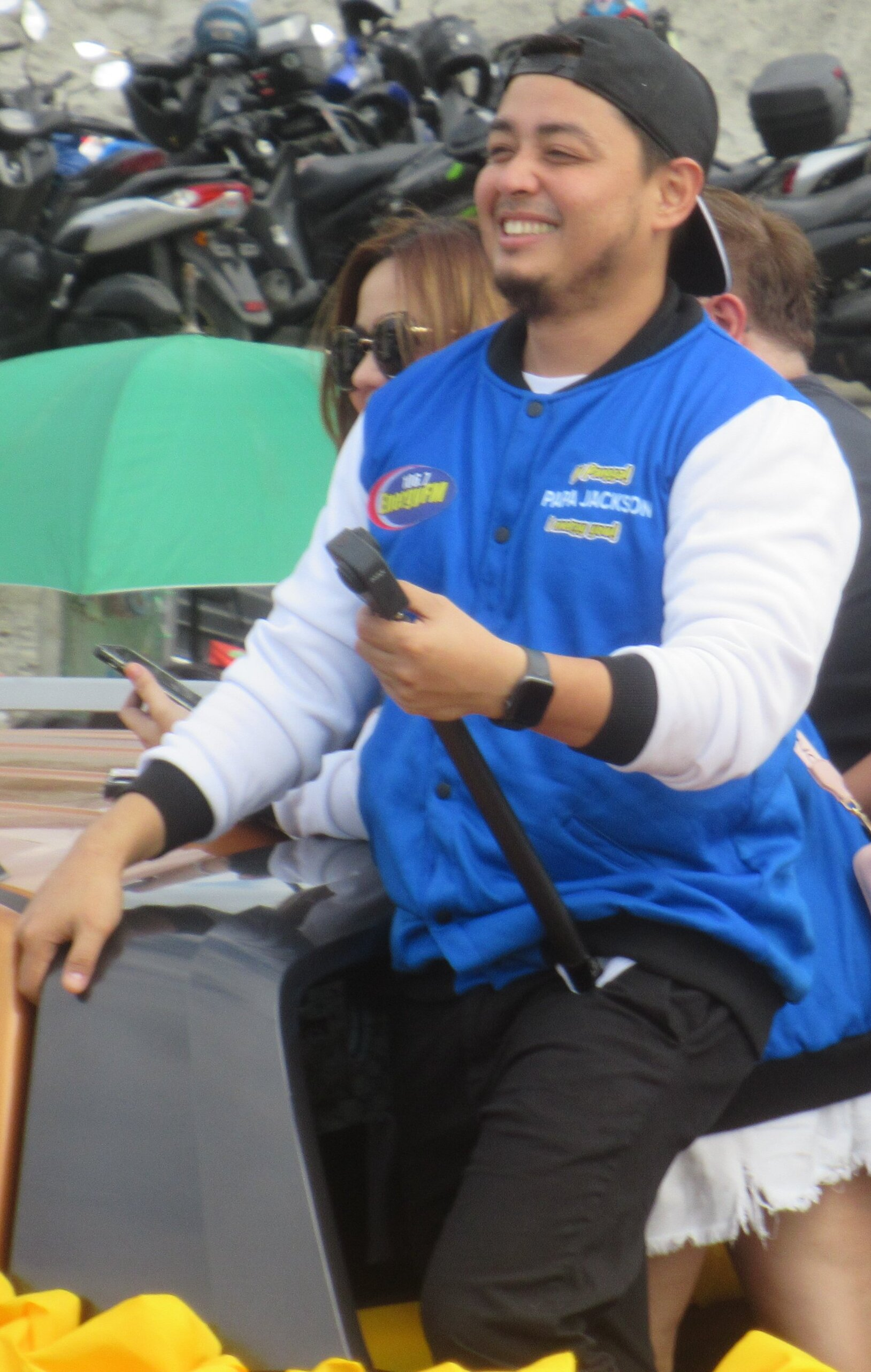
- Papa Jackson at the 2023 Metro Manila Film Festival
- Born: John S. Gemperle; September 8, 1982 (age 44); Alcala, Pangasinan, Philippines
- Presenting career
- Show: Petty Nights
- Stations: 90.7 Love Radio (2007–2016); 106.7 Energy FM (2017–2026); DWIZ (Since 2026)
- Time slot: Monday – Friday, 9PM – 12MN
- Country: Philippines
- Previous shows: TLC: True Love Conversations; Hello... STG (Sorry, Thank You and Goodbye); Gabi Na, Umaga Na! (with Gandang Kara)

John S. Gemperle (born September 8, 1982), better known as Papa Jackson and formerly as Papa Jack, is a Filipino radio disc jockey and television personality. He is best known for his former popular evening-to-late night radio programs TLC: True Love Conversations and Wild Confessions on 90.7 Love Radio Manila, which was simulcast on Love Radio stations nationwide and ran from 2007 to 2016.

Gemperle would later spend 9 years with Ultrasonic Broadcasting System from 2017-2026 through its flagship 106.7 Energy FM in a concurrent capacity as station manager and senior disk jockey through the late-night program, Hello, STG (Sorry, Thank You and Goodbye).

Outside of radio, Gemperle has authored two books about love advice, both of which are based on his previous radio shows.

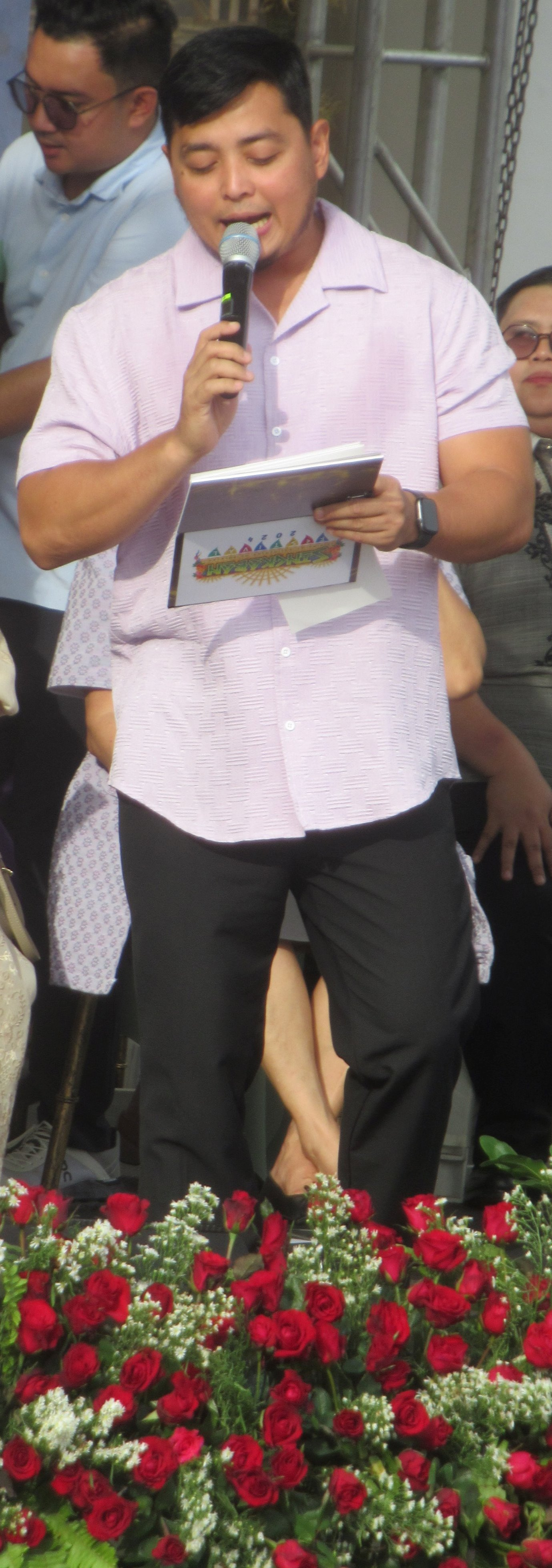
Jackson at Sinkaban Festival

== Early life and education ==
Gemperle was born in an impoverished family from Alcala, Pangasinan. At the age of 10, he became a farmer, a hog raiser and a vendor. By his high school years, he joined and won a modeling contest before moving to Manila for his studies until graduating with a bachelor's degree of mass communication at the Polytechnic University of the Philippines.

== Career ==
=== 2007–2016: Career beginnings; TLC: True Love Conversations ===
Prior to his career on radio, Gemperle started out as a call center agent but was also a listener of the Tambalan program on 90.7 Love Radio that aired on a late afternoon time slot by Chris Tsuper and Nicole Hyala.

Upon Love Radio conducting a DJ search in 2007, the 24-year old successfully got hired, beginning his career under his persona known as "Papa Jack". In mid-2007, he launched his love advice program TLC: True Love Conversations, which became one of the most popular radio shows in Metro Manila.

In 2013, Papa Jack and then-101.1 Yes FM DJ Chico Loco (Mark Jimel Gales) collaborated for a weekly program Gabi Na, Gising Na!, which lasted for 2 years.

He later ventured into television hosting, starting off with the talk show Star Box, alongside Ali Sotto on GMA Network. In March 2015, he became the host of his own program Call Me Papa Jack on TV5.

He also became a brand endorser for Motortrade, with rapper Gloc-9 and Julie Anne San Jose (formerly with Denise Barbacena).

=== 2017–2026: Rebranding as Papa Jackson ; Hello, STG ===
On December 16, 2016, Papa Jack made his final broadcast of his nightly radio program, and eventually resigned as a DJ of 90.7 Love Radio. Gemperle did not specify complete details about his resignation.

Prior to his final broadcast on 90.7, his last co-host was DJ Kara Karinyosa (Klariz Magboo); the chemistry of both led to listeners nicknaming the tandem on-the-air as KarJack.

On March 20, 2017, Papa Jack transferred 106.7 Energy FM and launched a new program, Hello... STG (Sorry, Thank You and Goodbye). The show initially ran every Monday to Thursday from 9 PM to 1 AM until the creation of Gabi Na, Umaga Na! on Fridays starting May 8, 2017 with the return of erstwhile collaborator Mark Jimel Gales (who, by that point, assumed the name of Kuya Chico). The duo would be later re-joined by DJ Kara on February 6, 2019.

Upon his move, Gemperle used "Papa J" as his new monicker but was eventually renamed to “Papa Jackson” in April 2017 to avert confusion and trademark issues as his former employer held the intellectual rights to the "Papa Jack" on-air name. He also served as the program manager of 106.7 Energy FM until November 2018 when he was promoted to station manager following significant listenership ratings gains. Gemperle would resign as station manager in October 2025 but remained as a regular DJ on Energy FM until fully departing the station in January 2026.

=== 2025–present: Petty Nights: aborted move to DWIZ ===
In October 2025, amidst changes and uncertainty with his position at Energy FM, Papa Jackson expanded his media presence by launching Petty Nights, a digital talk series on his official PAPA JACKSON YouTube channel, featuring a similar format of his earlier radio programs. Episodes of Petty Nights were released regularly on the channel while seeking his future options.

On March 3, 2026, Aliw Broadcasting Corporation signed Gemperle and Mark Jimel Gales (Kuya Chico) to become hosts for their flagship broadcast properties DWIZ-AM and Aliw Channel 23. The 43-year old veteran was planned by the network to host the love advice program Love Discussion and Reactions on weeknights at 9:00 PM. However, managerial changes at Aliw Broadcasting and DWIZ following the death of longtime 97.9 Home Radio manager Braggy Braganza on April 25, 2026 and sacking of Dennis L. Antenor Jr. as the company's Vice President for Business Development on May 8 repeatedly delayed and ultimately canceled the program's premiere. Gales, however would continue on DWIZ alone with the premiere of Night Talks on June 15, occupying the timeslot planned for Gemperle.

== Personal life ==
Aside from his work at Love Radio during the first years of TLC: True Love Conversations, he also became one of the instructors for mass communication students at the Polytechnic University of the Philippines Manila, his alma mater - helping run PUP's campus radio DZMC 98.3 as trainer to students and faculty on the basics of broadcasting. He also performed as a singer at Padi's Point - a local restaurant and bar chain.

On April 28, 2013, he married Toni Rose Maniago. The couple separated around 2016.

== Filmography ==
=== TV ===
Year	Title	Role
2011	Star Box	Co-Host
2013	It's Showtime	Judge
2015	Call Me Papa Jack	Host
2015	Rising Stars Philippines	Judge
2026	Sigabo	Papa Love

== Radio ==
Year	Title	Notes	Station
2007–2016	TLC: True Love Conversations		90.7 Love Radio
2007–2014; 2016	Wild Confessions		90.7 Love Radio
2012–2014	The Letter		90.7 Love Radio
2013–2015	Gabi Na, Gising Na!	Co-hosted with Chico Loco	101.1 Yes! FM
2014–2016	TLC: The Drama Special Interactive	Occasional voice actor	90.7 Love Radio
2017–2026	Hello... STG (Sorry, Thank You and Goodbye)		106.7 Energy FM
2017–2021	Gabi Na, Umaga Na!	Co-hosted with Kuya Chico (2017–2019); Gandang Kara (2019–2021)	106.7 Energy FM
2021–2026	KarJack	Co-hosted with Gandang Kara on late Friday nights	106.7 Energy FM
2024–2026	ChiPa!	Co-hosted with Kuya Chico on Wednesday nights	106.7 Energy FM

== Authored books ==
- Everything I Need to Know About Love, I Learned from Papa Jack. Mandaluyong: Summit Books. 2013. ISBN 9789719902270.
- Everything I Need to Know About Moving On, I Learned from Papa Jack. Mandaluyong: Summit Books. 2014. ISBN 9789719902706. (also a give away for August 2015 FHM)

== Awards ==
Year	Award-Giving Body	Category	Result
2012	Yahoo! OMG Awards	Best Male Disc Jockey	Won
2013	Yahoo! OMG Awards	Best Male Disc Jockey	Won
2014	Yahoo! Celebrity Awards	Male DJ of the Year	Won
2017	RAWR Awards	Favorite Radio DJ	Won
