= Star Box (talk show) =

2011 Philippine television talk show

- Title card
- Genre: Talk show
- Directed by: Louie Ignacio
- Presented by: Ali Sotto; Papa Jack; MM & MJ Magno
- Country of origin: Philippines
- Original language: Tagalog
- No. of episodes: 28

Production
- Camera setup: Multiple-camera setup
- Running time: 30 minutes
- Production company: TAPE Inc.

Original release
- Network: GMA Network
- Release: April 4 – May 13, 2011

Star Box is a 2011 Philippine television talk show broadcast by GMA Network. Directed by Louie Ignacio, it is hosted by Ali Sotto, Papa Jack, MM Magno and MJ Magno. It premiered on April 4, 2011. The show concluded on May 13, 2011, with a total of 28 episodes.

== Ratings ==
According to AGB Nielsen Philippines' Mega Manila household television ratings, the pilot episode of Star Box earned a 7.7% rating.
