= Lucban longganisa =

Filipino pork sausage

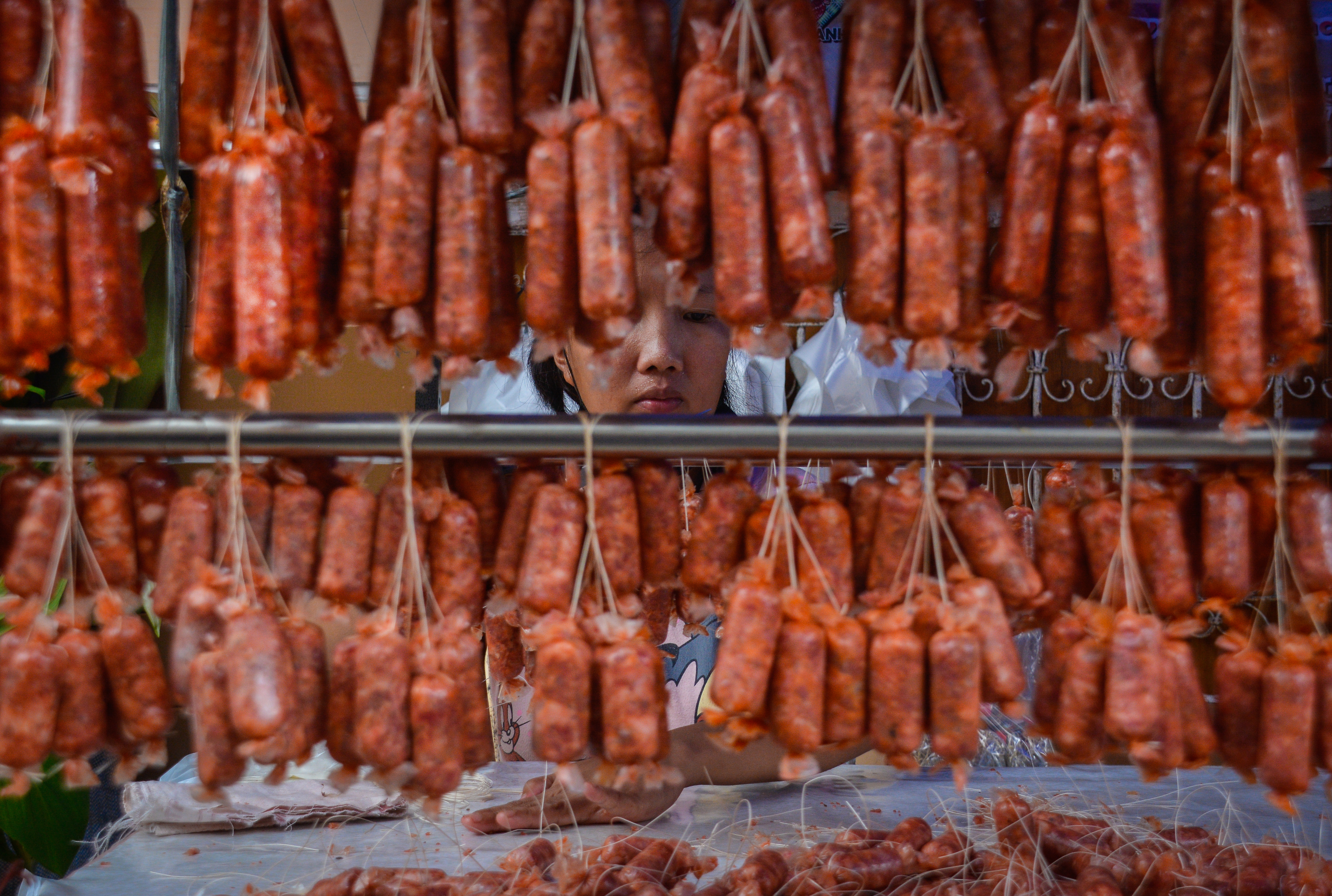
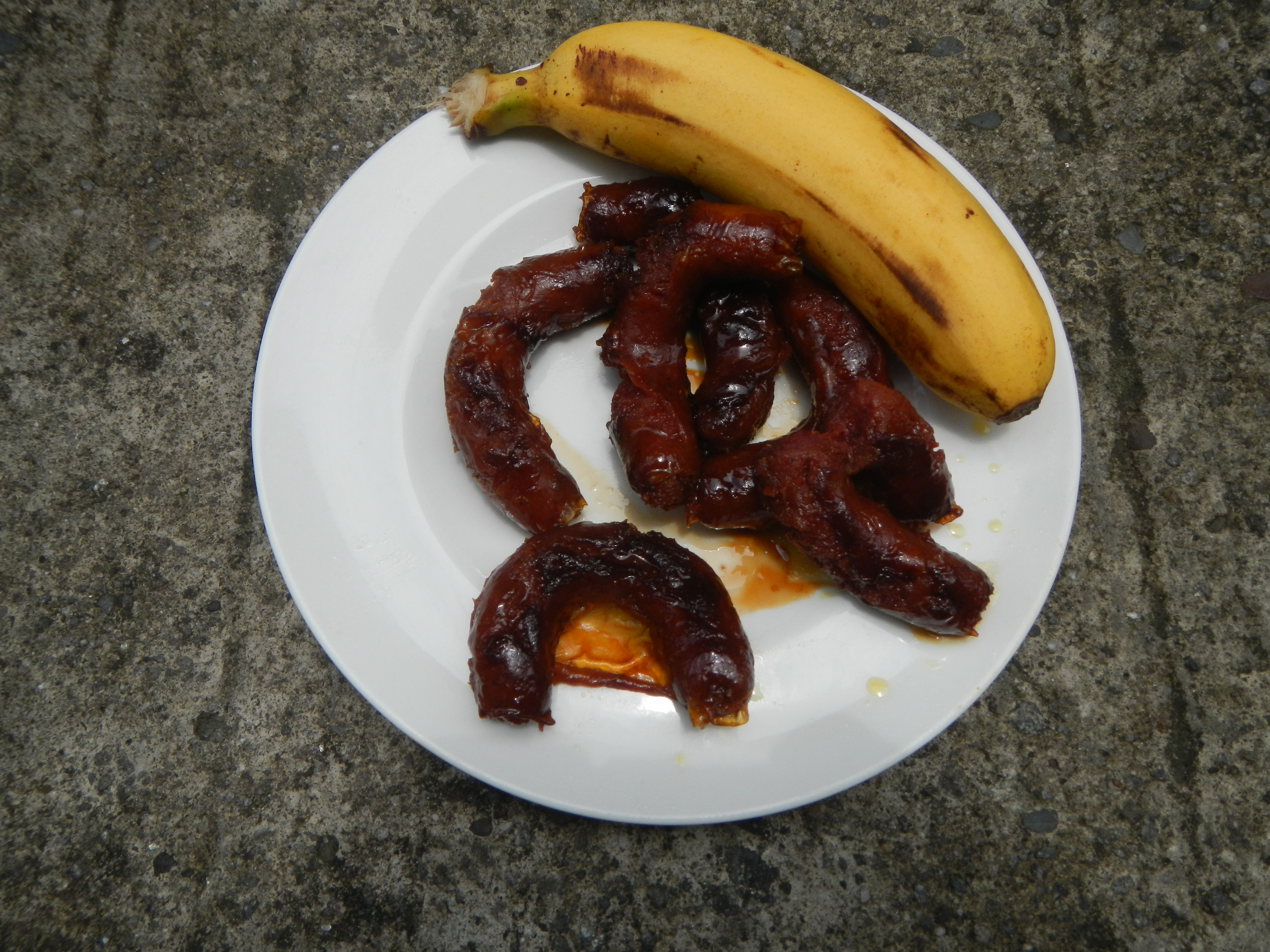
- Course: Sausage
- Place of origin: Philippines
- Region or state: Lucban, Quezon
- Main ingredients: Pork

Lucban longganisa is a Filipino pork sausage originating from Lucban, Quezon. It is a type of de recado longganisa. It is characterized by its use of oregano and its garlicky and sour taste. It is made with coarse and lean pork, pork fat, coarse salt, onions, garlic, oregano, paprika, peppercorns, sugar, and vinegar. It can be prepared with or without the sausage casing.
