= DZMB =

Radio station in Metro Manila, Philippines

Love Radio Manila (DZMB)
- 90.7 Love Radio logo since November 2021
- Pasay; Philippines
- Broadcast area: Mega Manila and surrounding areas
- Frequency: 90.7 MHz
- RDS: 1. LOVE; 2. RADIO
- Branding: 90.7 Love Radio

Programming
- Language: Filipino
- Format: Contemporary MOR, OPM
- Network: Love Radio

Ownership
- Owner: MBC Media Group; (Cebu Broadcasting Company)
- Sister stations: DZRH-TV; DZRH; 96.3 Easy Rock; 101.1 Yes FM

History
- First air date: July 1, 1946 (on AM band); February 14, 1975 (on FM band)
- Former call signs: KZMB (1946–1948)
- Former frequencies: 760 kHz (1946–1975)
- Call sign meaning: Manila Broadcasting Company

Technical information
- Licensing authority: NTC
- Power: 25,000 watts
- ERP: 75,000 watts
- Transmitter coordinates: 14°35′9.76″N 121°03′29.66″E

Links
- Webcast: Listen Live
- Website: Love Radio

DZMB (90.7 FM), broadcasting as 90.7 Love Radio, is a radio station owned and operated by MBC Media Group through its licensee Cebu Broadcasting Company. It serves as the flagship station of the Love Radio Network. The station's studio is located on the Second Floor, MMG Building, Star City, V. Sotto St., CCP Complex, Roxas Boulevard, Pasay. Its transmitter is located at the BSA Twin Towers, Bank Drive, Ortigas Center, Mandaluyong, sharing the same site with sister stations 96.3 Easy Rock and 101.1 Yes FM.

== History ==
=== Early years ===
Manila Broadcasting Company (MBC) founded the first music radio station in Manila under the callsign KZMB, which started its operations on the AM band on July 1, 1946, and was then originally broadcast at 760 kHz on the AM band. The station was assigned to Cebu Broadcasting Company, an associate to the Elizalde family which also owns MBC. It also served as the sister station of DZRH and another established station DZPI in 1949.

In 1948, following the international telecommunications conference in the United States where the Philippines changed its first letter to "D", KZMB changed its callsign to DZMB.

In September 1972, when President Ferdinand Marcos declared Martial Law, the dictatorship shut down and took over radio stations to silenced public criticism and opposition by controlling information that people had access to. DZMB was then allowed to resume operations a few months later.

=== Migration to FM ===
On February 14, 1975, MBC converted DZMB to the FM band, assigned at 90.7 MHz. The station maintained its music programming but it began airing as an easy listening station, earning the on-air moniker known as "Beautiful Music". Most notable personalities who worked on the station during that time were Mel Tiangco, Jay Sonza, and Reysie Amado.

In the 1980s, Manuelito "Manny" F. Luzon took over the management of the station, and reforming DZMB 90.7 under the new identity: 90.7 Love Radio. With this new strategy, 90.7 Love Radio became one of the most-listened to stations in Manila.

The station's easy listening format lasted for over the next two decades until the beginning of the new millennium.

=== Kabisyo era ===
On February 14, 2000, marking its 25th anniversary, 90.7 Love Radio was relaunched with a fresh new logo and the catchy tagline "Kailangan pa bang i-memorize 'yan? Bisyo na 'to!"; phrases that soon became part of the everyday vocabulary of many Filipinos plus a catchy theme jingle from Filipino girl group, Sooperbabes. Following the relaunch, the station was reformatted into a mass-based station, inspired by the rising popularity of its sister station, Yes FM 101.1. In the years that followed, Love Radio steadily climbed the ratings, eventually surpassing Yes FM 101.1 to become the top-rated FM station. Its strong listener base and relatable programming helped it maintain the #1 spot in FM radio ratings for several consecutive years.

In 2004, 90.7 Love Radio became the launchpad for the careers of now-iconic radio personalities Chris Tsuper and Nicole Hyala. The duo introduced their program Tambalang Balasubas at Balahura, which initially aired during a late-afternoon to early-evening time slot before moving to its current and highly popular morning schedule. Due to its massive success and loyal following, the program eventually began airing via satellite across all Love Radio stations nationwide, further cementing its status as a staple in Filipino radio entertainment.

In 2007, John Gemperle, widely known by his on-air name "Papa Jack" joined the station. He quickly rose to prominence after launching TLC: True Love Conversations, a love advice program that became one of the most popular night-time radio shows. Papa Jack remained a staple of the station until his departure on December 16, 2016. He subsequently moved to 106.7 Energy FM on March 20, 2017.

Following MBC's acquisition of 96.3 DWRK from the Hodreal family in 2008, the company strategically reallocated DZMB to its original station licensee Cebu Broadcasting Company. This is to allow the transfer of 96.3's license to MBC's own franchise, streamlining the company's broadcast portfolio.

On October 2, 2019, a major fire broke out at the Star City theme park, affecting the main studios of 90.7 Love Radio at the MBC Building in CCP Complex, Pasay, along with its sister stations under MBC. In the aftermath, Love Radio temporarily operated from its backup studio at the BSA Twin Towers in Ortigas Center, Mandaluyong, where its transmitter is located. On November 11, 2019, Love Radio Manila moved its studio at Design Center of the Philippines, situated near the MBC Building across Vicente Sotto Street.

On November 15, 2021, after a two-year hiatus, Love Radio Manila, alongside sister stations 96.3 Easy Rock and 101.1 Yes The Best, returned to the newly renovated MBC Building within the Star City complex, which was still undergoing rehabilitation and reconstruction at the time. That same day, MBC unveiled its new corporate slogan Sama-Sama Tayo, Pilipino! (lit. transl. We're altogether, Filipinos!), along with refreshed logos for all MBC radio stations. Meanwhile, MBC’s AM station, DZRH continued to operate from its interim studios at the Design Center of the Philippines, located near the MBC Building, before officially relocating on December 17, 2021.

On March 4, 2023, the station launched its very own Top 10 Countdown. Later that year, Love Radio expanded its initiatives by debuting its student jock program, Love Radio Academy.

On February 14, 2024, in celebration of its 49th anniversary, Love Radio launched the radio drama program Dear Love, offering listeners stories and narratives. Alongside this addition, the station also refreshed its iconic slogan: "Kailangan pa bang i-memorize yan? Basic!"

In October 2024, Chris Tsuper left the station to run for councilor of Lucban, Quezon for the 2025 Philippine Midterm Elections. As a result, his long-running program Tambalan, co-hosted with Nicole Hyala, aired its final broadcast on October 11, 2024, marking the end of an era after more than two decades on air.

== Notable Personalities ==
=== Former ===
- Papa Jack (2007–16)
- Mike Enriquez (1970’s, pre Love Radio era)

== Awards ==
- Best Male Disk Jockey - ALTA Media Icon Awards for Chris Tsuper (2016)
- Best FM Station - ALTA Media Icon Awards (2016)
- Best FM Station - 24th KBP Golden Dove Awards (2016)
- Best FM Station - 23rd KBP Golden Dove Awards (2015)
- Best FM Station - 2014 Yahoo PH Celebrity Awards
- Best Female Disk Jockey for Nicole Hyala - 2013 Yahoo! OMG Awards
- Best Female Disk Jockey for Nicole Hyala - 2012 Yahoo! OMG Awards
- Best Radio Program: Tambalang Balasubas at Balahura for Nicole Hyala and Chris Tsuper - 2012 Yahoo! OMG Awards
- Best Male Disk Jockey for Papa Jack - 2012 Yahoo! OMG Awards
- Best Male Disk Jockey for Papa Jack - 2013 Yahoo! OMG Awards
- Male DJ of the Year for Papa Jack - 2014 Yahoo! Celebrity Awards
- Best Radio Comedy Program: Tambalan for Nicole Hyala and Chris Tsuper - 27th KBP Golden Dove Awards (2019)
