= Lucban Church =

Roman Catholic church in Quezon, Philippines

- Saint Louis Bishop Parish Church
- San Luis Obispo de Toulousa Parish Church and Diocesan Shrine of San Isidro Labrador
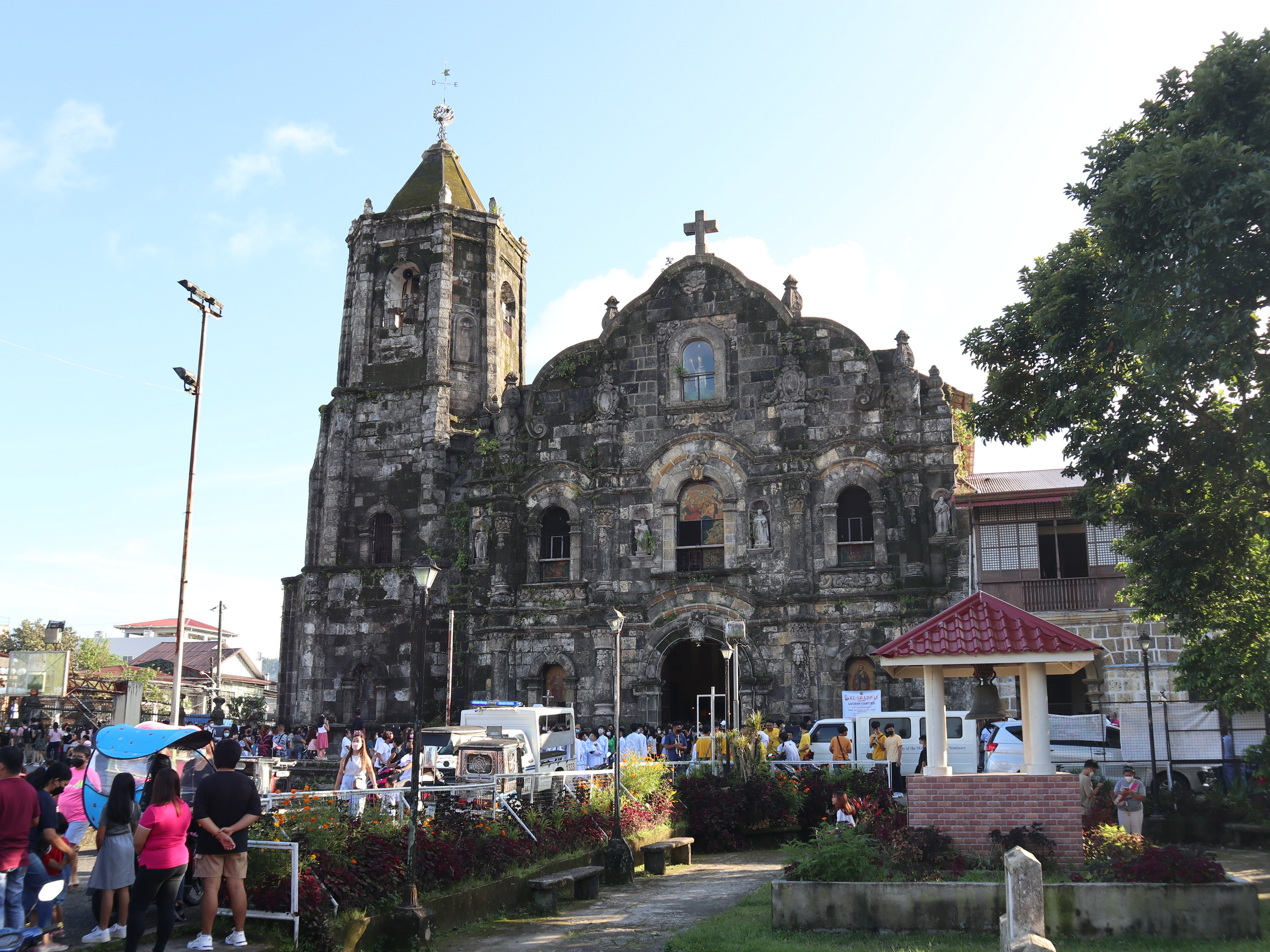
- Church façade after its 2018 restoration

- Location in Luzon Location in the Philippines
- 14°06′53″N 121°33′13″E
- Location: La Purisima Concepcion St., Poblacion, Lucban, Quezon
- Country: Philippines
- Denomination: Roman Catholic

History
- Status: Parish church - Diocesan Shrine
- Founder(s): Fray Juán Portocarrero de Plasencia, OFM and Fray Diego Oropesa, OFM
- Dedication: Saint Louis of Toulouse

Architecture
- Functional status: Active
- Architectural type: Church building
- Style: Baroque
- Completed: 1738, 2019 (restoration)

Administration
- Province: Lipa
- Archdiocese: Lipa
- Diocese: Lucena

Clergy
- Archbishop: Most. Rev. Gilbert Garcera, DD
- Bishop(s): Most Rev. Mel Rey M. Uy, DD
- Priest(s): Rev. Msgr. Melecio B. Verastigue, PC

Saint Louis Bishop Parish Church, also known as San Luis Obispo de Tolosa Parish Church, Saint Louis of Toulouse Parish Church and Diocesan Shrine of San Isidro Labrador, commonly known as Lucban Church, is a Roman Catholic parish church located in Lucban, Quezon, Philippines under the supervision of the Diocese of Lucena. Its titular is Saint Louis, Bishop of Toulouse.

== History ==
Father Juan de Plasencia and Father Diego de Oropesa de San José, known as the Apostles of Laguna and Tayabas, established the visita of Lucban in 1578 and started evangelizing the people of the town. The visita was elevated to a parish in 1595 under Father Miguel de Talavera alongside the construction of its first church made of wood, dedicated to Saint Louis of Toulouse.

The first church was ruined in 1629 and a second church was established on the present site. Construction of the second church, made of stone, masonry, and nipa, proceeded from 1630 to 1640 and the convent was finished in 1650. Church roofing was changed to tiles in 1683 under the supervision of Father Francisco Huerta.

Fire destroyed the building in 1733. That same year, Father Pascual Martinez began construction of a third building, the present one, which was completed in 1738. The rebuilt convent was completed in 1743. On April 4, 1945, the day American soldiers liberated Lucban during World War II, the church was partially damaged by a bomb. It was immediately reconstructed under the supervision of Monsignor Antonio Radovan.

In July 2014 Typhoon Glenda destroyed the roof over the altar, causing flooding inside the church. Under the supervision of the National Historical Commission of the Philippines, the church underwent a full-scale exterior restoration in 2019. It is being proposed as a diocesan shrine under the tutelage of Saint Isidro Labrador.

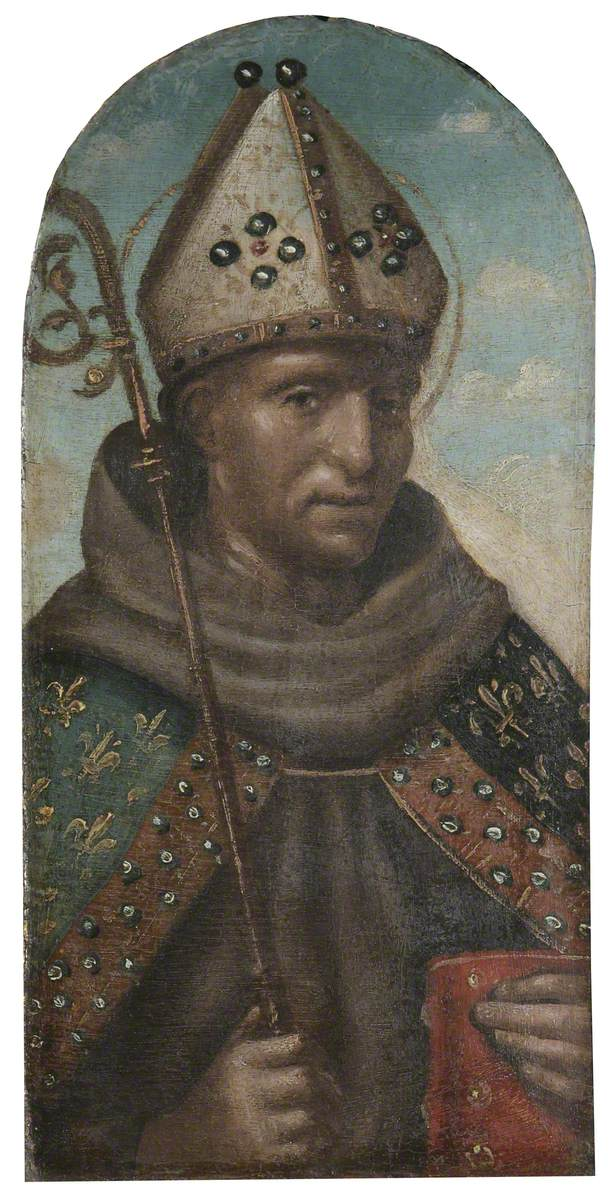
Saint Louis d'Anjou, also known as the "Boy Bishop", titular of Lucban, Quezon

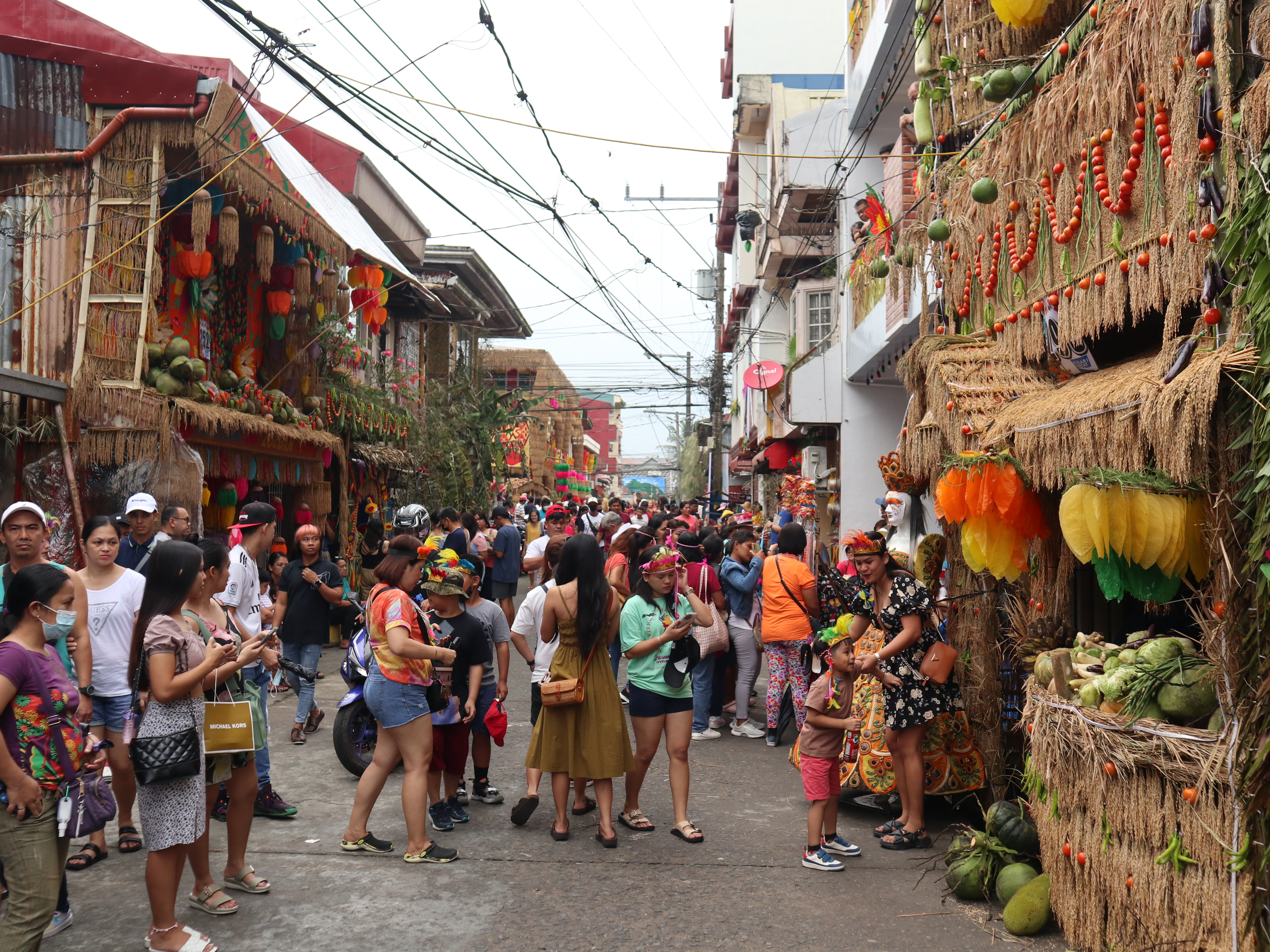
Pahiyas is held every May 15 to honor St. Isidore the Laborer, the patron saint of farmers and good harvest

== Architectural features ==
The church follows the baroque design. It has a three-story facade. The second level features semi-circular windows flanked by Corinthian columns and niches containing statues of saints. The church also has an octagonal, three-story bell tower standing on a square base.

== Administration ==
San Luis Obispo Parish Church is within the jurisdiction of the Vicariate of Saint Thomas of the Roman Catholic Diocese of Lucena. Presently, it is administered by Rev. Msgr. Melecio Verastigue, PC and is assisted by Rev. Fr. Reymart Karl Estrada as parochial vicar.

== Lucban Catholic Cemetery ==
Locally known as Campo Santo, the cemetery was built in 1848 during the time of Fray Manuel Sancho, OFM and Capt. Simeon de Ramos. Its construction was paused briefly until Don Casimiro Antonio de Leon decided to complete the project. In 1882, in order to control the spread of cholera and reduce the number of deaths, Don Victor Eleazar oversaw the building of a small chapel (capilla) within the cemetery complex in such a way that will prevent the people from passing by the parish church to get the priest's final blessing. The impact of cholera on the town was not as grave as was expected. Because of the building's distinct and eerie character, various horror movie shots were filmed here.

== Pahiyas Festival ==
A 6:00 AM Mass at the church marks the start of the colorful Pahiyas Festival every May 15; at 7:00 AM, a procession leaves the church carrying the images of San Isidro Labrador and Beata María de la Cabeza on a route around the town.

== Other popular devotions ==
=== Santo Entierro de Lucban ===
The Santo Entierro de Lucban is regarded by the locals as a miracle-worker. Every Good Friday procession, the image is processed throughout the town in a custom similar to that of Quiapo's Traslacion. According to Pantaleon Nantes' account, it ended up in a pawnshop in Manila causing many illnesses to the townspeople. Later on, two prominent families — the Lukban-Villaseñor Clan and the present owners, the Rañola clan — have contested the image's original ownership to the extent that they fought all the way to the Real Audiencia. The high court ruled in favor of the latter; it happened in 1892.

=== Kalbaryo ===
Kalbaryo is a local commemoration of Saint Helena and Bishop Macarius' discovery of Christ's real cross that is held every May 3.

== Gallery ==
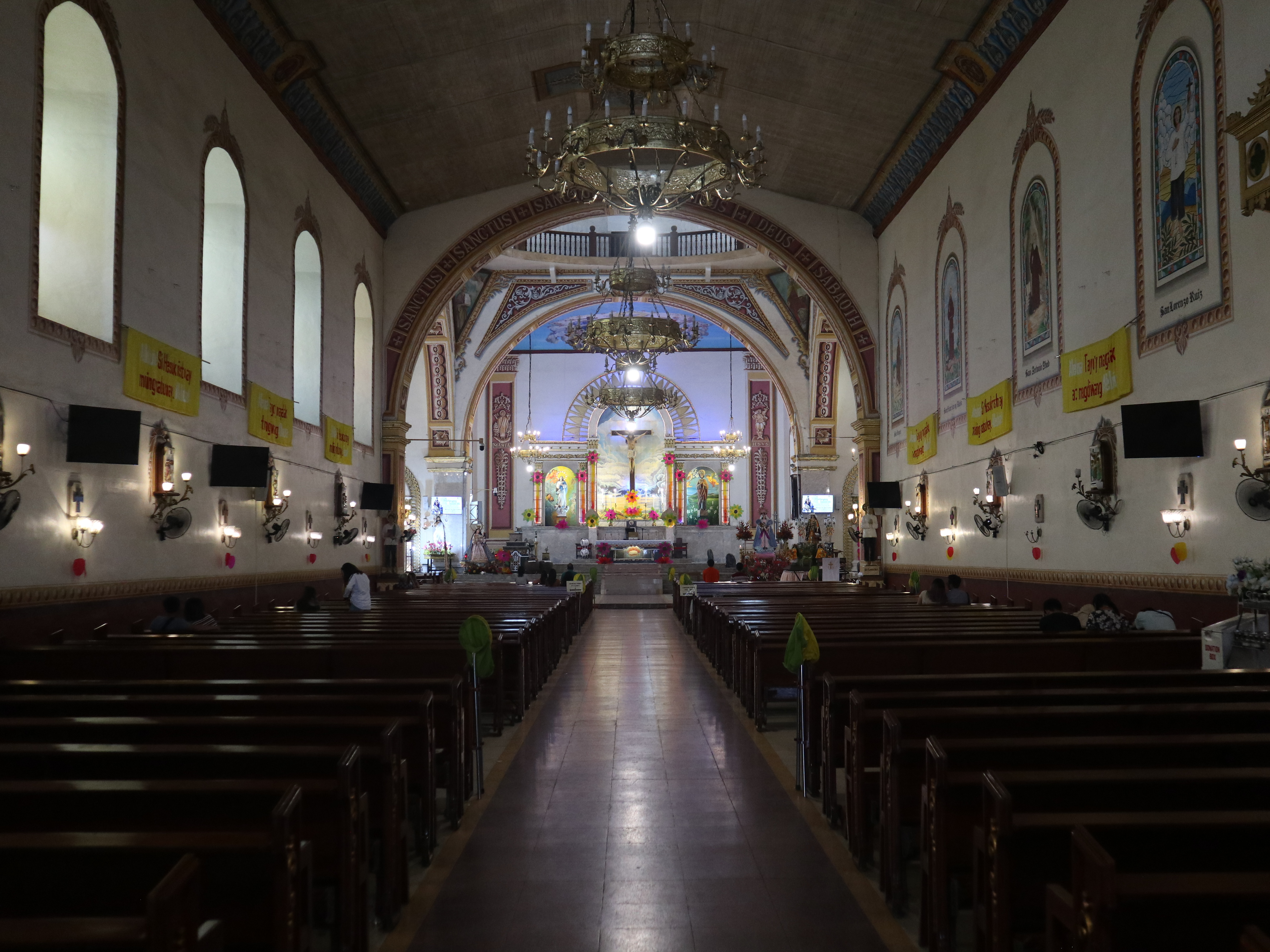
Church interior in 2023

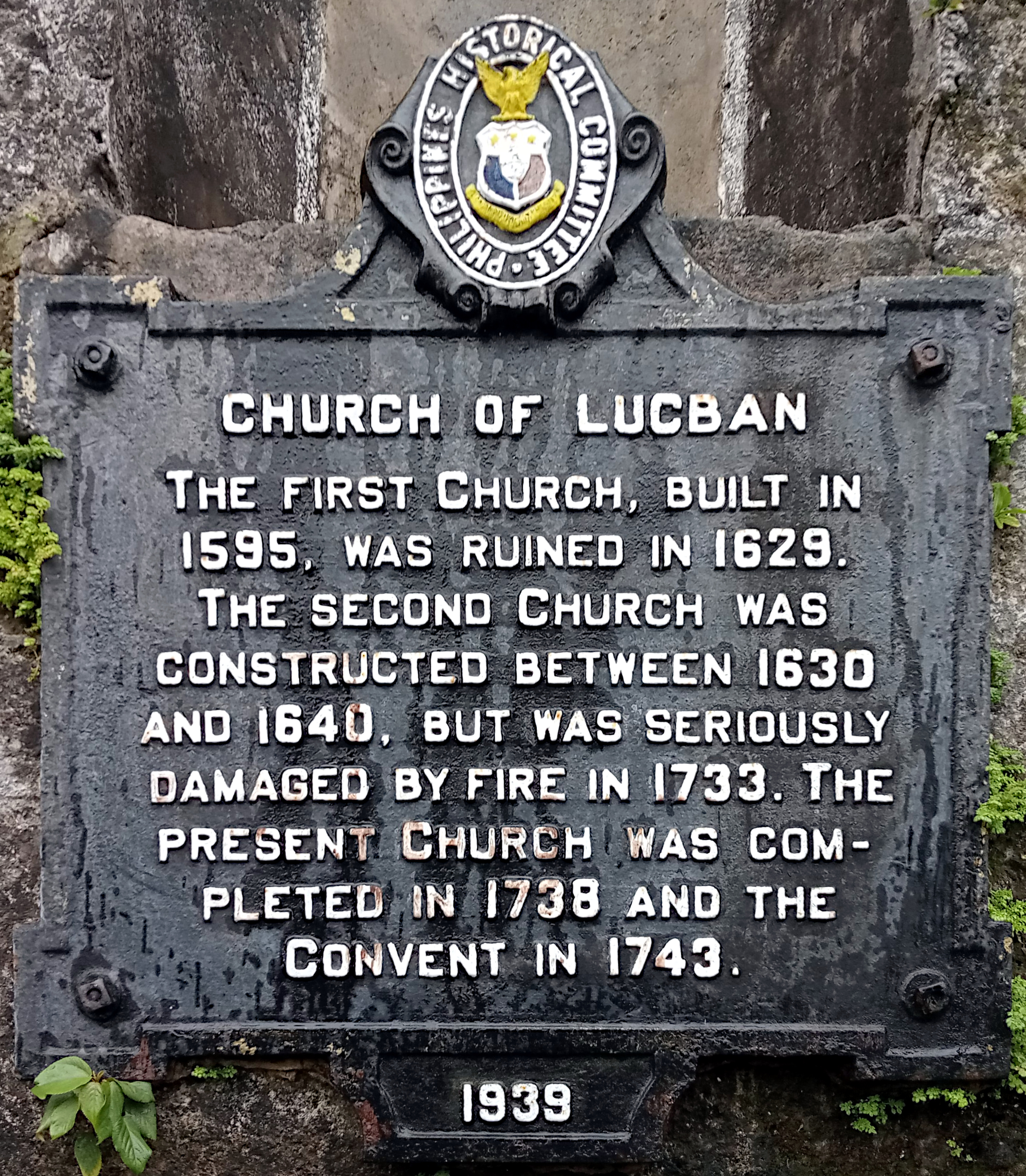
National historical marker installed in 1939

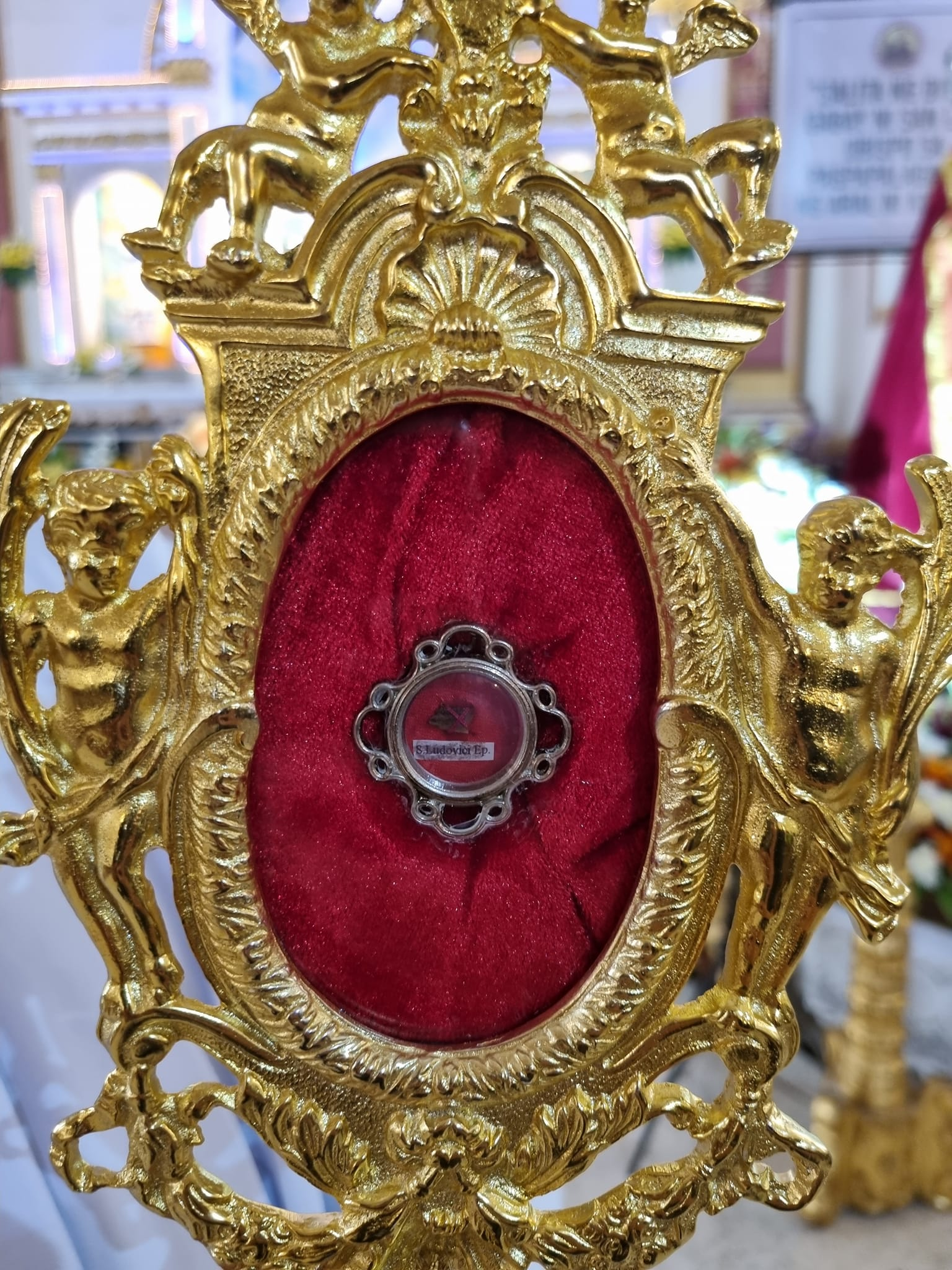
Bone Relic of Saint Louis of Toulouse under the care of the parish

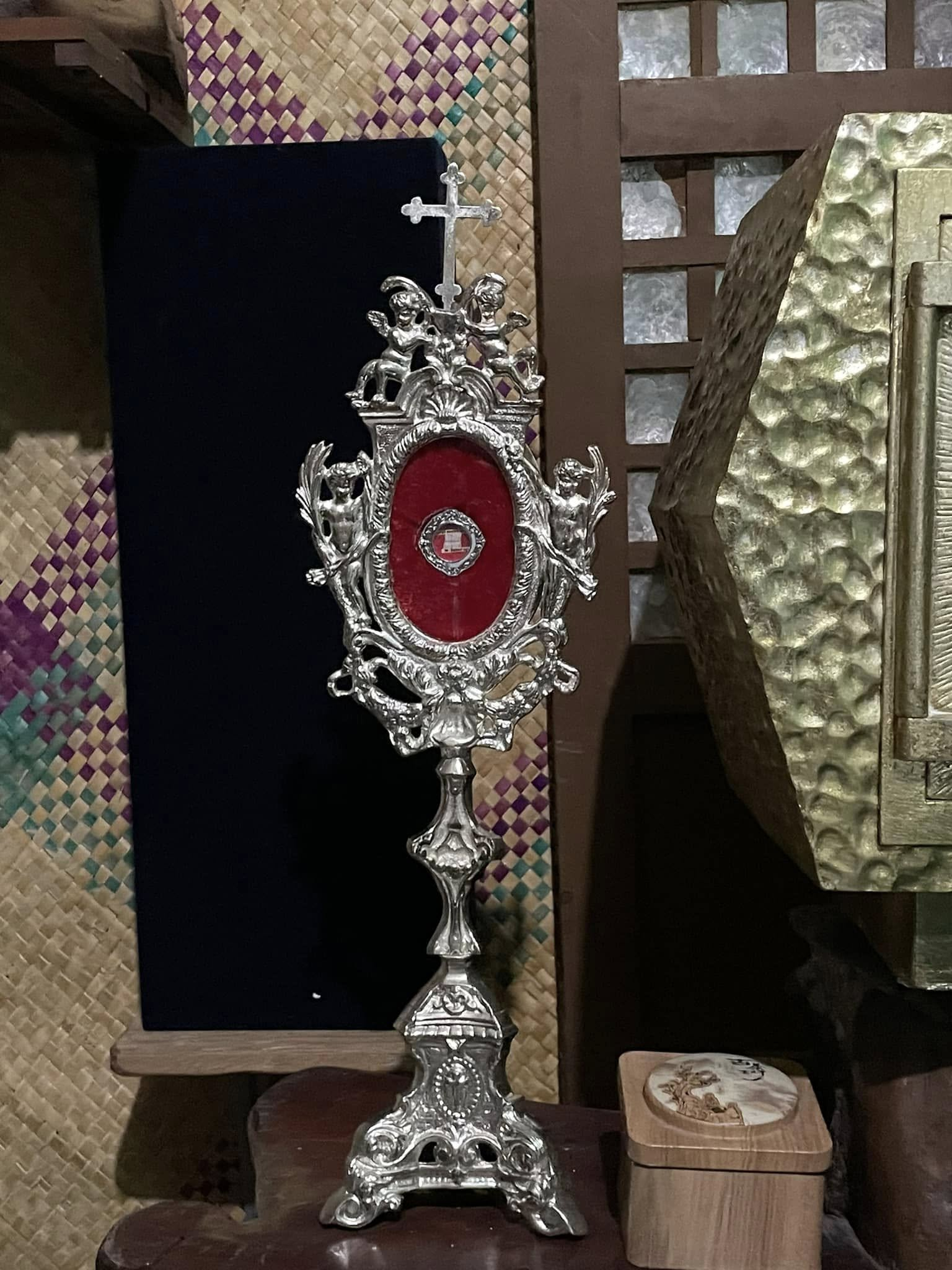
Second-class ex linteis relic of Saint Isidore the Laborer under the care of the parish

== Bibliography ==
- Arnold, John H. (2014). The Oxford Handbook of Medieval Christianity. OUP Oxford. ISBN 9780191015014.
- Brunner, Melanie (2011). "Poverty and Charity: Pope John XXII and the canonization of Louis of Anjou". Franciscan Studies. 69.
- Cusato, Michael F.; Geltner, Guy (2009). Defenders and Critics of Franciscan Life: Essays in Honor of John V. Fleming. BRILL. ISBN 978-9004176300.
- Grieco, Holli J. (2013). "In Some Way Even More than Before: Approaches to Understanding St. Louis of Anjou, Franciscan Bishop of Toulouse". In Jansen, Katherine L.; Geltner, G.; Lester, Anne E. (eds.). Center and Periphery: Studies on Power in the Medieval World in Honor of William Chester Jordan. Brill.
- Historical Markers: Regions I-IV and CAR. Manila: National Historical Institute (Philippines). 1993. p. 85. ISBN 9715380611.
- Huerta, Felix de (1865). Estado geográfico, topográfico, estadístico, histórico religioso. Binondo: Imprenta de M. Sanchez y Ca.
- Johnson, Timothy (2007). Franciscans at Prayer. BRILL. ISBN 9789047419891.
- Musto, Ronald G. (2003). Apocalypse in Rome: Cola di Rienzo and the Politics of the New Age. University of California Press.
- Pryds, Darleen N. (2000). The King embodies the world: Robert d'Anjou and the politics of preaching. BRILL. ISBN 9004114025.
- Tolan, John V. (2009). Saint Francis and the Sultan: The Curious History of a Christian-Muslim Encounter. OUP Oxford. ISBN 9780199239726.
- Toynbee, Margaret (1929). S. Louis of Toulouse and the Process of Canonisation in the Fourteenth Century. Manchester University Press.
