= Kamay ni Hesus Healing Church =

Roman Catholic church in Quezon, Philippines

Coordinates: 14°06′05″N 121°34′22″E

Kamay ni Hesus Shrine
- Kamay ni Hesus Healing Church
- Healing Church of the Risen Christ
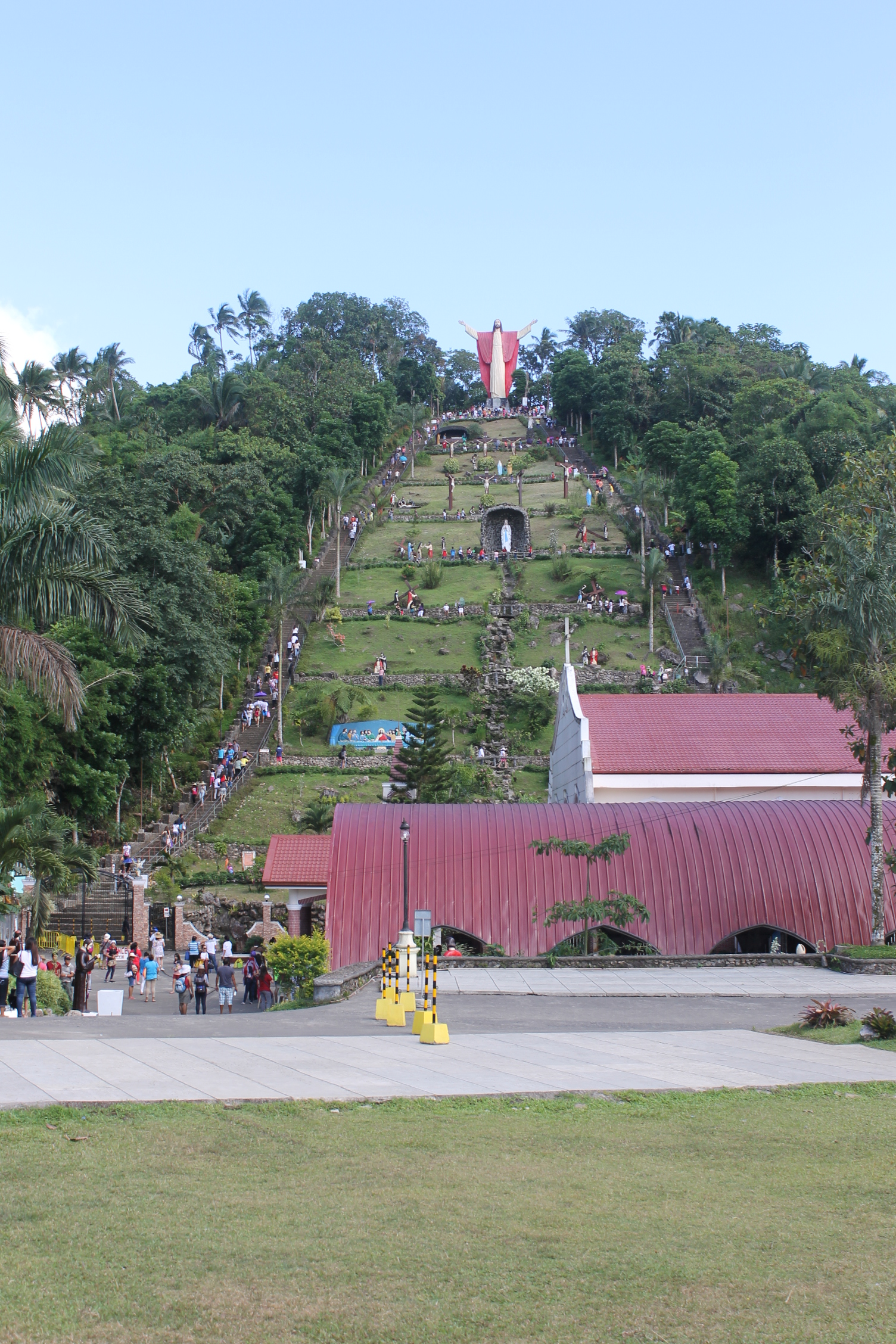
- The church and the nearby hill within the Shrine

- Location in Luzon Location in the Philippines
- Location: Lucban-Tayabas Road, Tinamnan, Lucban, Quezon Province
- Country: Philippines
- Denomination: Roman Catholic

History
- Status: Parish church
- Founded: 2002
- Founder: Rev. Fr. Joseph Faller

Architecture
- Functional status: Active
- Architectural type: Church building
- Completed: 2004, 2020 (restoration)

Specifications
- Capacity: 60,000

Administration
- Province: Lipa
- Archdiocese: Lipa
- Diocese: Lucena

Clergy
- Archbishop: Most Rev. Gilbert Garcera, DD
- Bishop(s): Most Rev. Mel Rey Uy, DD

The Kamay ni Hesus Healing Church,(lit. 'Hand of Jesus') also known as the Healing Church of the Risen Christ and commonly known as the Kamay ni Hesus Shrine, is a Roman Catholic church and tourist destination found along the Lucban-Tayabas Road in barangay Tinamnan, Lucban, Quezon province, Philippines under the supervision of the Diocese of Lucena.

== History ==
The construction of the shrine and the surrounding complex commenced in February 2002 and was completed in 2004. It was built through donations and an inheritance received by its founder. The shrine was temporarily closed in 2020 and 2021 due to travel restrictions in connection to community quarantine measures but was reopened in 2022.

== Features ==
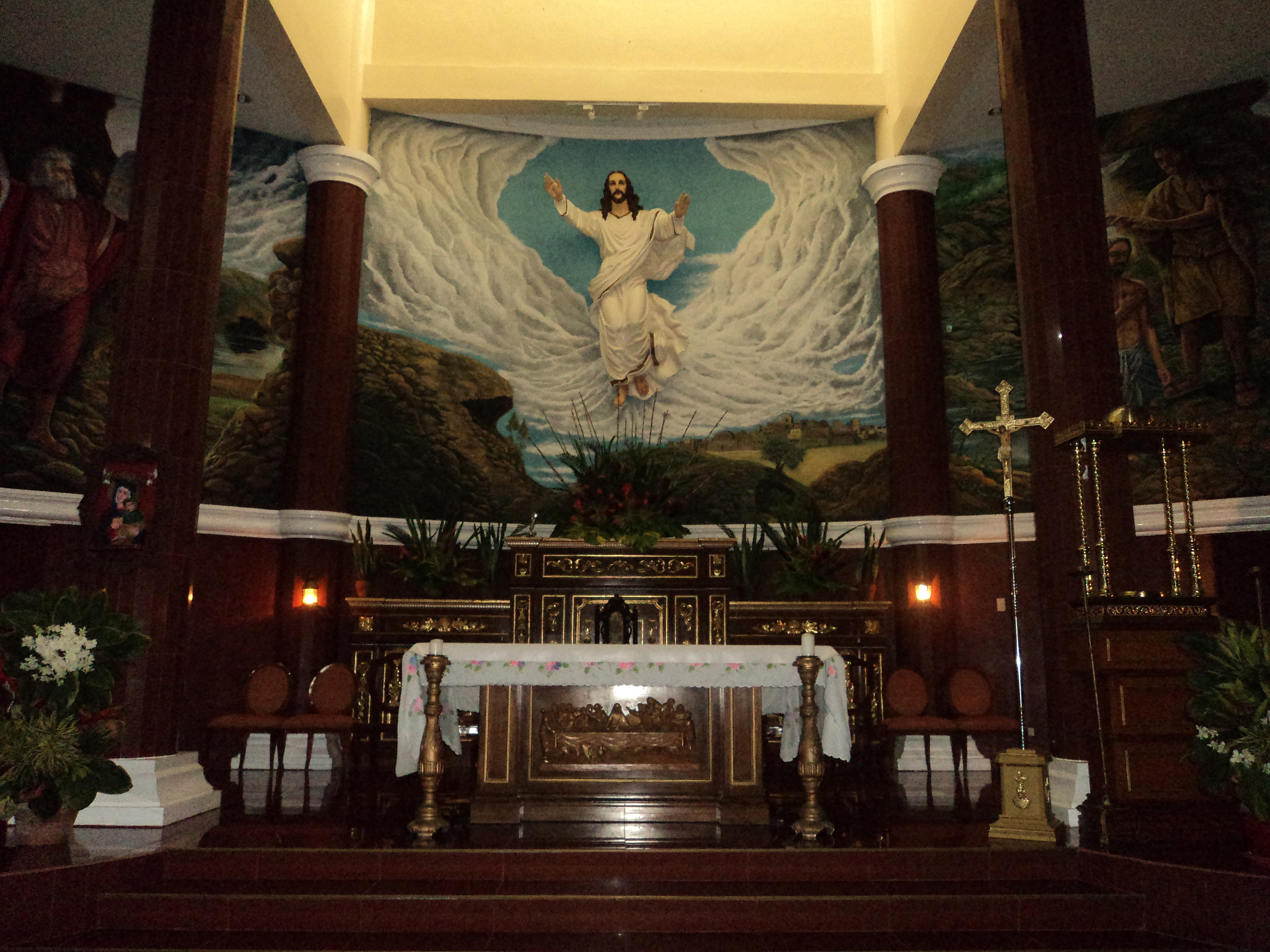
The church's sanctuary in 2010

The shrine and the surrounding complex covered an area of 5 hectares (12.36 acres) but was expanded to 7 hectares (17.30 acres). The shrine contains a healing chapel where masses are conducted but has encountered instances of overcrowding despite the chapel having a capacity of 1,000 people. A building dubbed as the "healing dome", subsequently named as the Healing Church of the Risen Christ, was completed in November 2022. Near the church and chapel is a hill containing scenes depicting the way of the Cross and a statue depicting the ascension of Jesus. The shrine also has an outdoor museum containing replicas of Biblical events and characters.
