= Lucban =

Municipality in Quezon, Philippines

- Municipality
- Municipality of Lucban
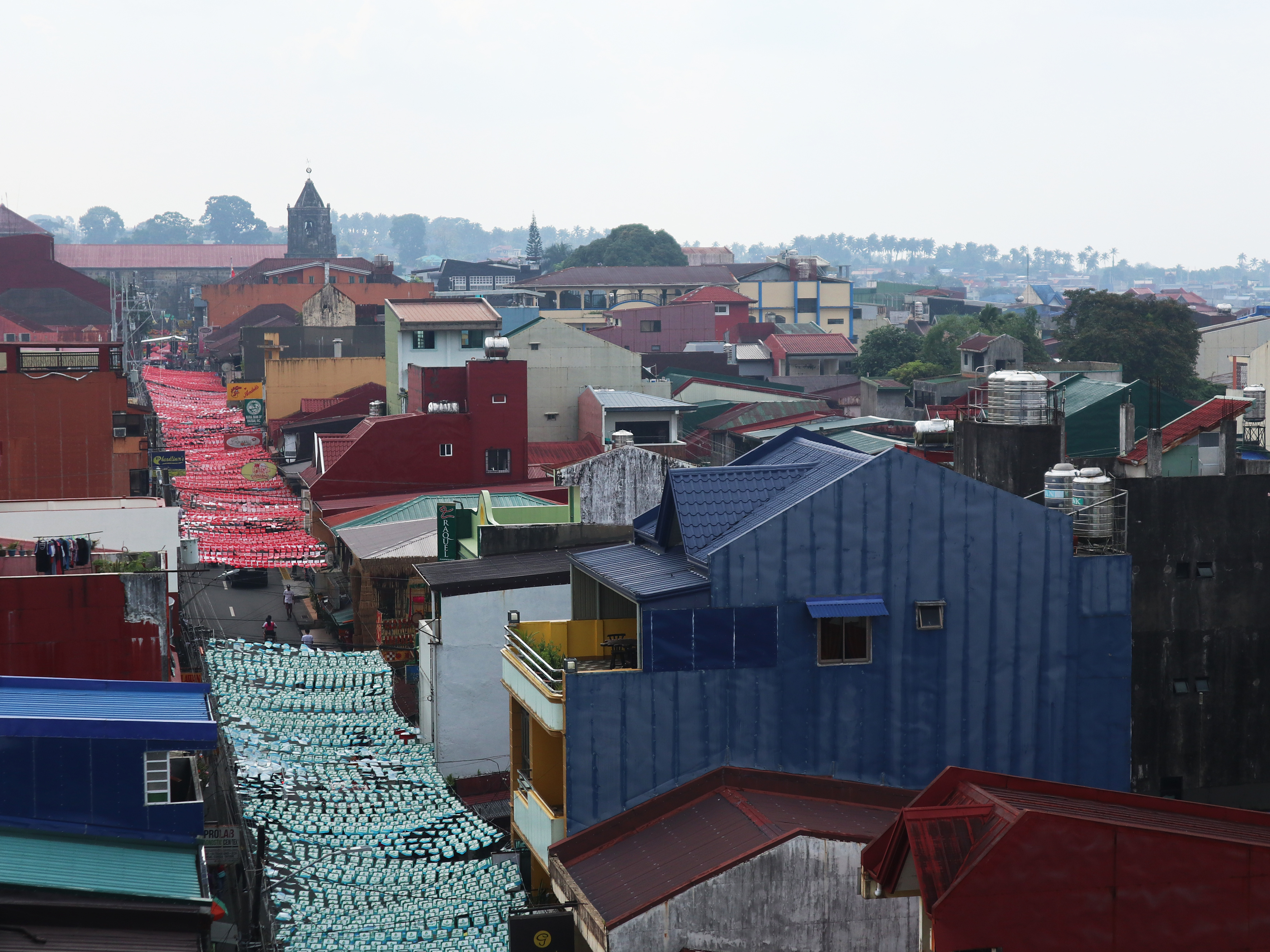
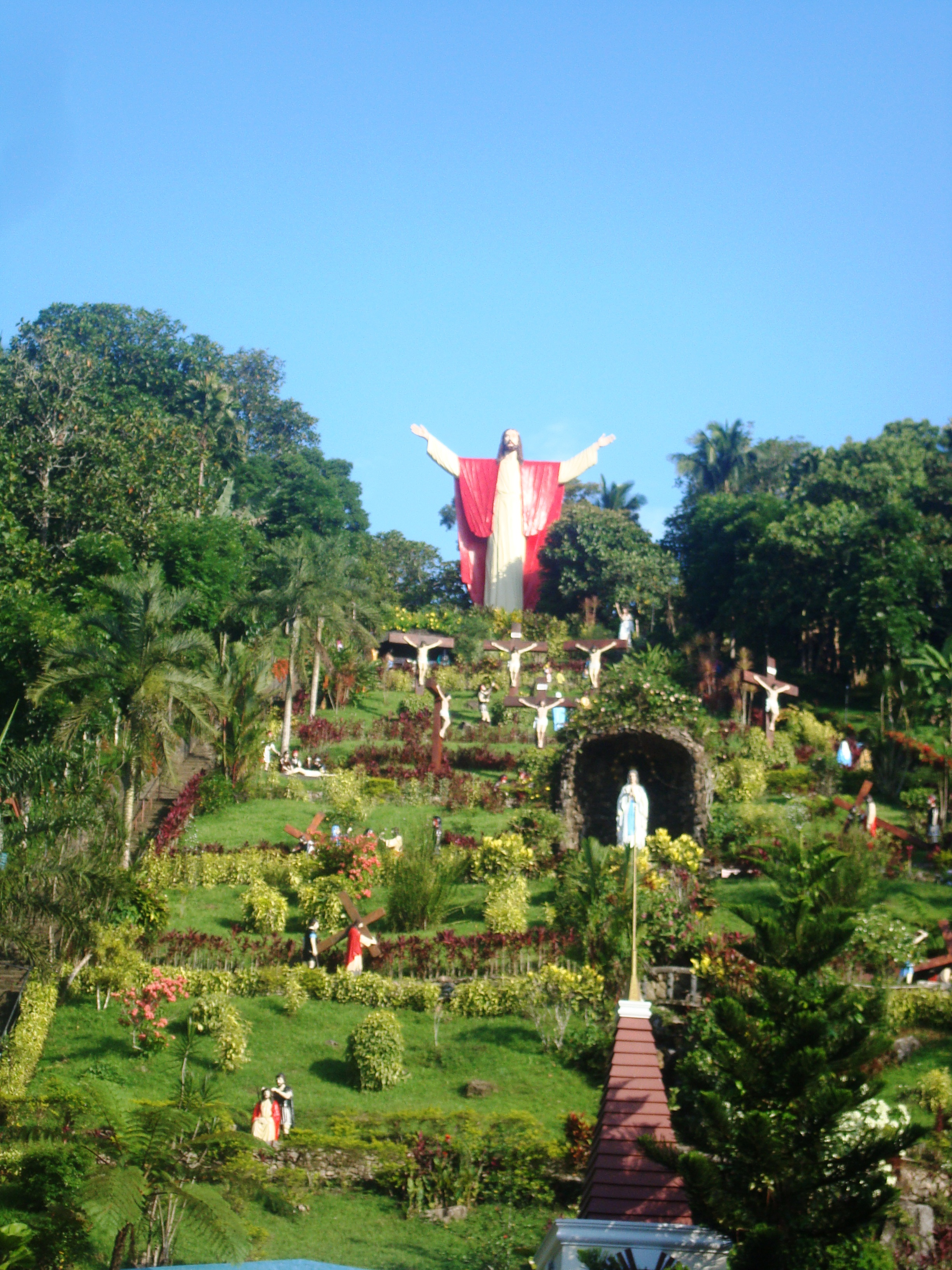
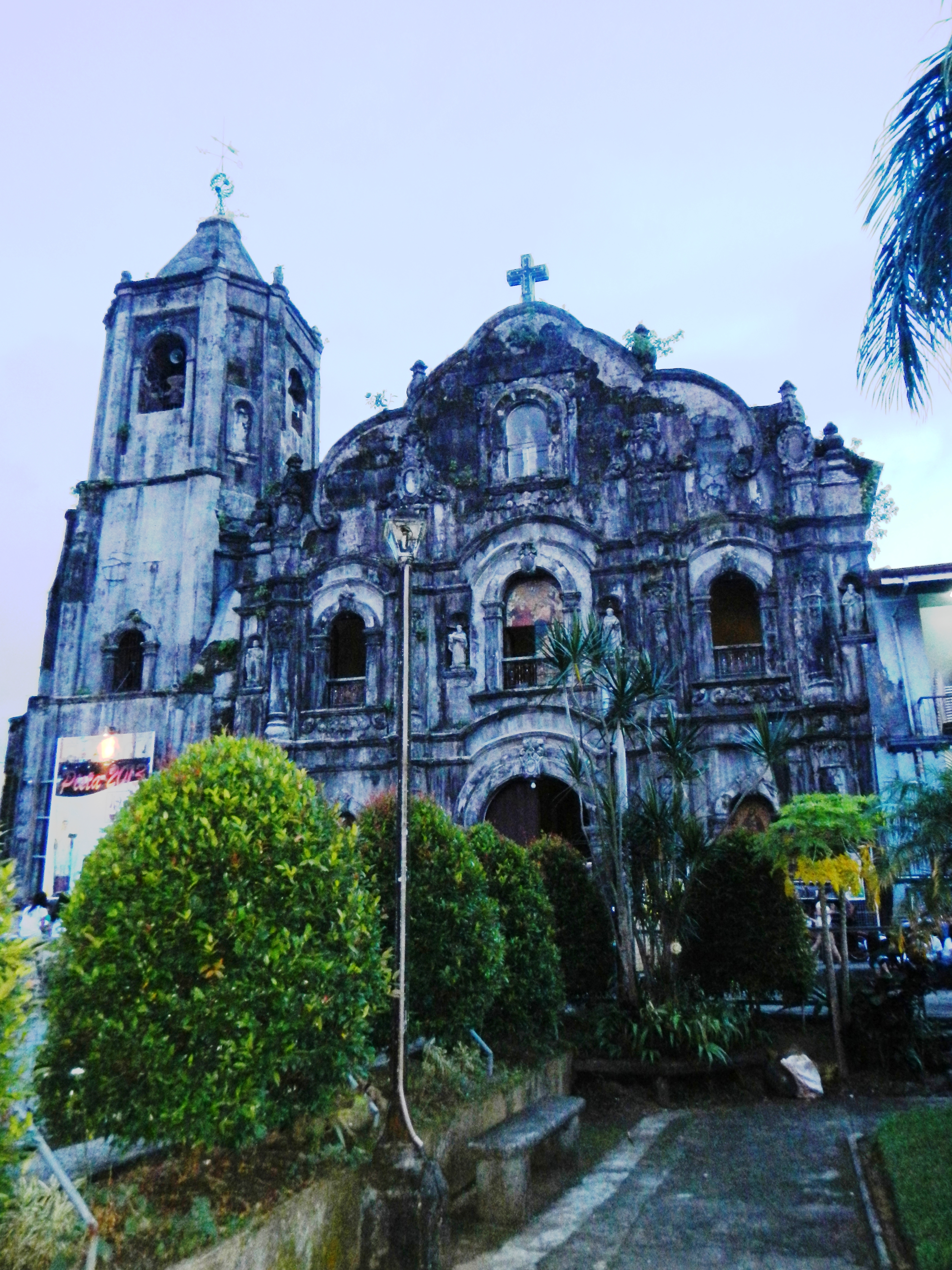
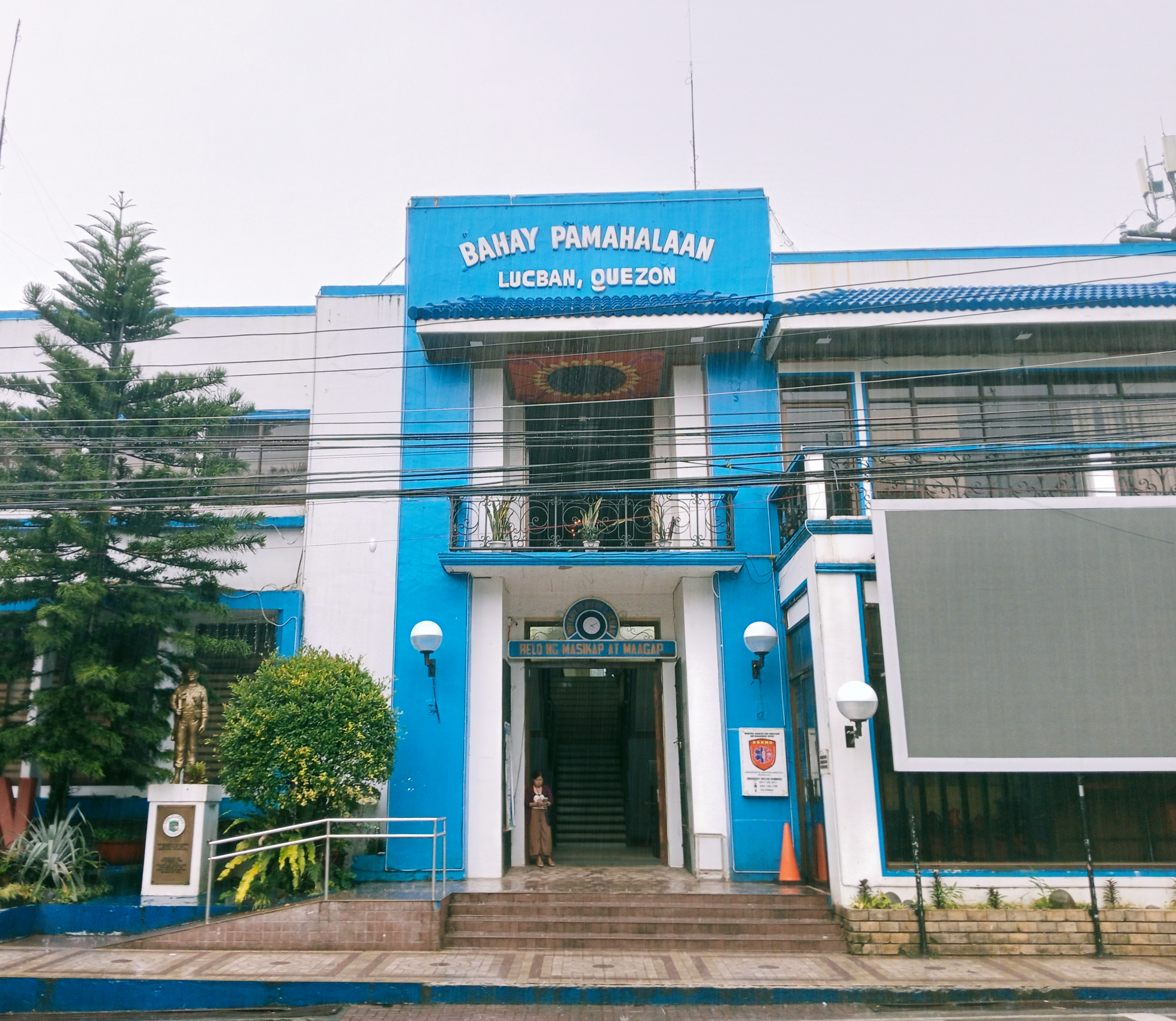
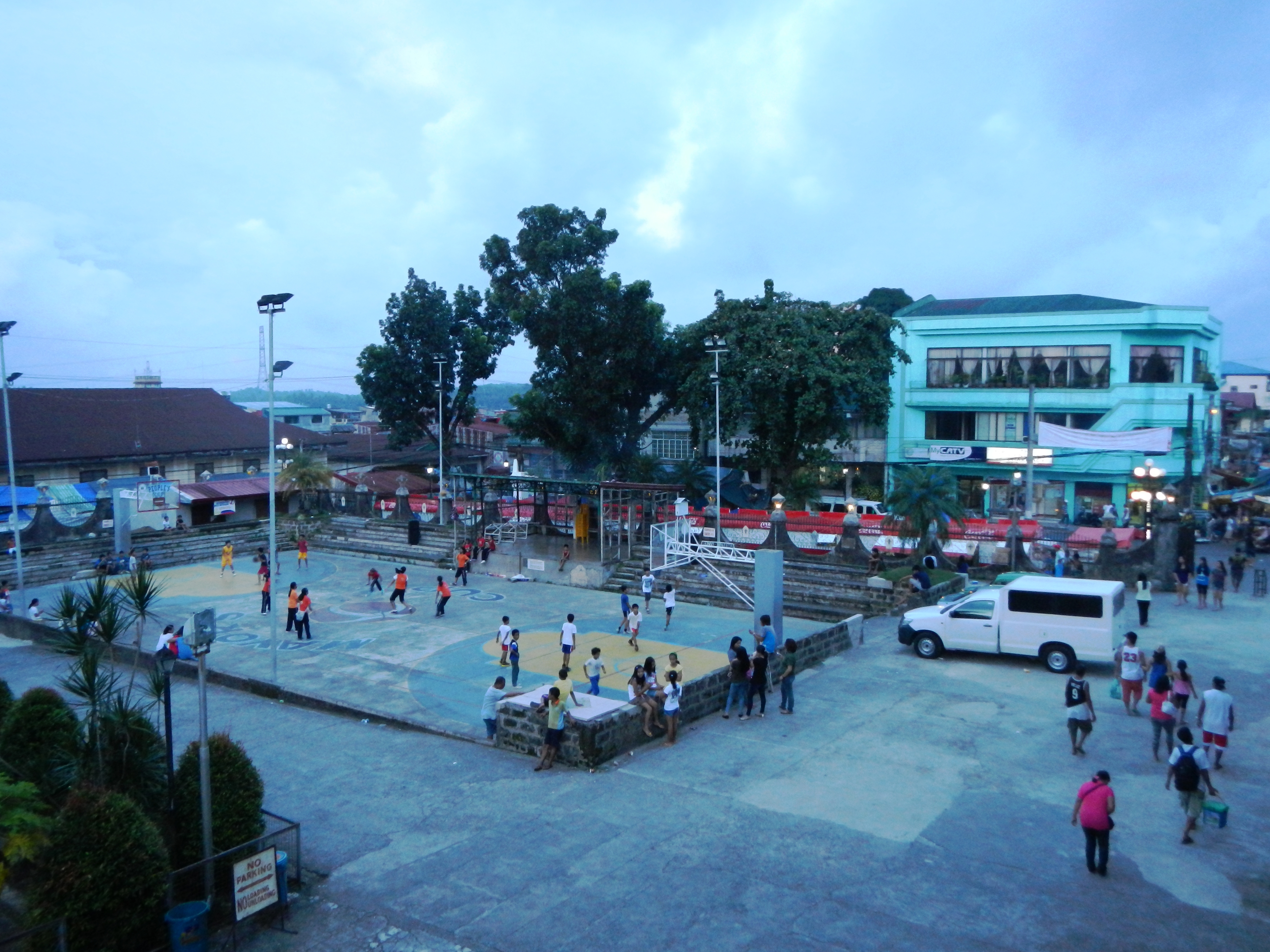
- Clockwise from top: Town Proper, Lucban Church, Plaza, Municipal Hall, Kamay Ni Hesus Healing Shrine

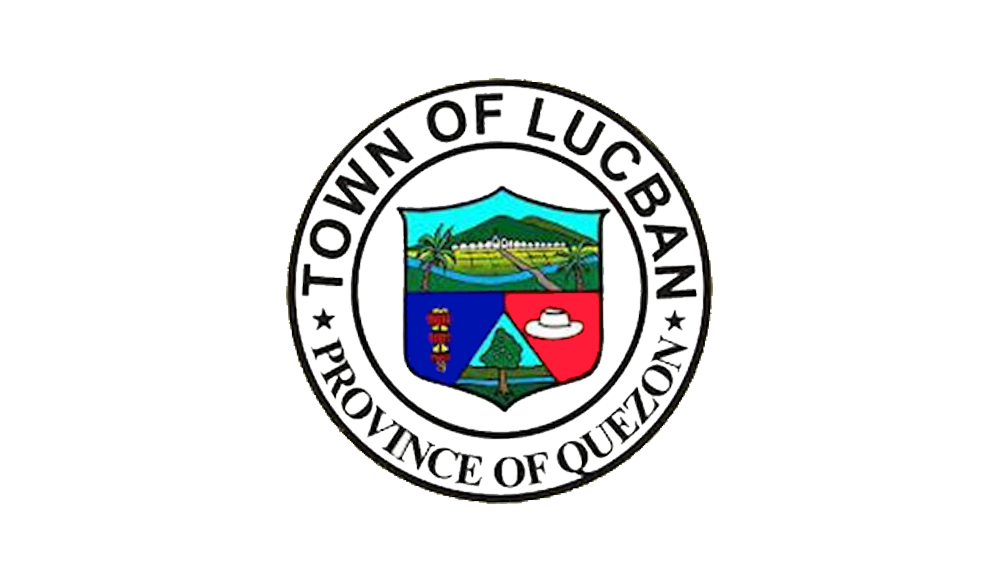
- Flag Seal
- Nicknames: Home of Pahiyas; Art Capital of Quezon; Longaniza Capital of Southern Tagalog
- Motto: Yanong Rikit! Baling Ganda!
- Anthem: Lucban, Paraiso kong Bayan
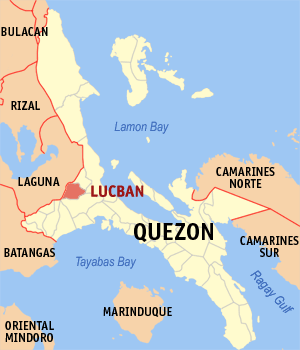
- Map of Quezon with Lucban highlighted
- Interactive map of Lucban
- Location within the Philippines
- Coordinates: 14°06′48″N 121°33′25″E
- Country: Philippines
- Region: Calabarzon
- Province: Quezon
- District: 1st district
- Founded: August 19, 1578
- Barangays: 32 (see Barangays)

Government
  - Type: Sangguniang Bayan
  - Mayor: Agustin M. Villaverde
  - Vice Mayor: Avin Villaseñor
  - Representative: Wilfrido Mark M. Enverga
  - Municipal Council: Members: Eduardo Alamo; Nyerwina Pavino; Aven Bince V. Rada; Faye Dominique Deveza; Pio Lim Jr.; Marife V. Hari; Mike Borines; Freddie Martinez
  - Electorate: 36,961 voters (2025)

Area
  - Total: 130.46 km^{2} (50.37 sq mi)
- Elevation: 521 m (1,709 ft)
- Highest elevation: 1,872 m (6,142 ft)
- Lowest elevation: 252 m (827 ft)

Population (2024 census)
  - Total: 54,134
  - Density: 414.95/km^{2} (1,074.7/sq mi)
  - Households: 12,692
- Demonym(s): Lucbanin, Lukbanin

Economy
  - Income class: 1st municipal income class
  - Poverty incidence: 3.21% (2023)
  - Revenue: ₱ 287 million (2024)
  - Assets: ₱ 664.4 million (2024)
  - Expenditure: ₱ 15.04 million (2024)
  - Liabilities: ₱ 96.23 million (2024)

Service provider
  - Electricity: Manila Electric Company (Meralco)
  - Water: Apolinario Dela Cruz Waterworks System
  - Telecommunications: PLDT; LUKTEL
  - Cable TV: BANAHAW CATV
- Time zone: UTC+8 (PST)
- ZIP code: 4328
- PSGC: 0405623000
- IDD : area code: +63 (0)42
- Native languages: Tagalog
- Website: www.lucban.gov.ph

Lucban, officially the Municipality of Lucban (Tagalog: Bayan ng Lukban), is a municipality in the province of Quezon, Philippines. According to the 2024 census, it has a population of 54,134 people.

It is dubbed as the Summer Capital, Art Capital, Dance Capital, Tourist Capital, and Rice Capital of Quezon province. The town is also known for its annual Pahiyas Festival, which is held every May 15 in honor of San Isidro Labrador. The municipality is locally the 'Baguio' counterpart of the province.

== Etymology ==
Legend has it the town derives its name from the lukbán or pomelo tree. Three hunters from neighbouring Majayjay— namely Marcos Tigla, Luis Gamba, and Lucas Mañawa— lost their way following the trail of wild animals at the foot of volcanic Mount Banahaw. Resting under a tree, they saw a crow (uwák) in the tree's branches, and believing this to be a bad omen, they moved to another place and rested again. Whilst in the shade of a large pomelo (lucbán) tree, the trio was attracted to a couple of kingfishers (salacsác) that were singing. Fascinated by the bird's plumage and rhythmic chirps, the superstitious hunters took this as a sign of good fortune and thus settled in the place they named "Lucbán."

== History ==
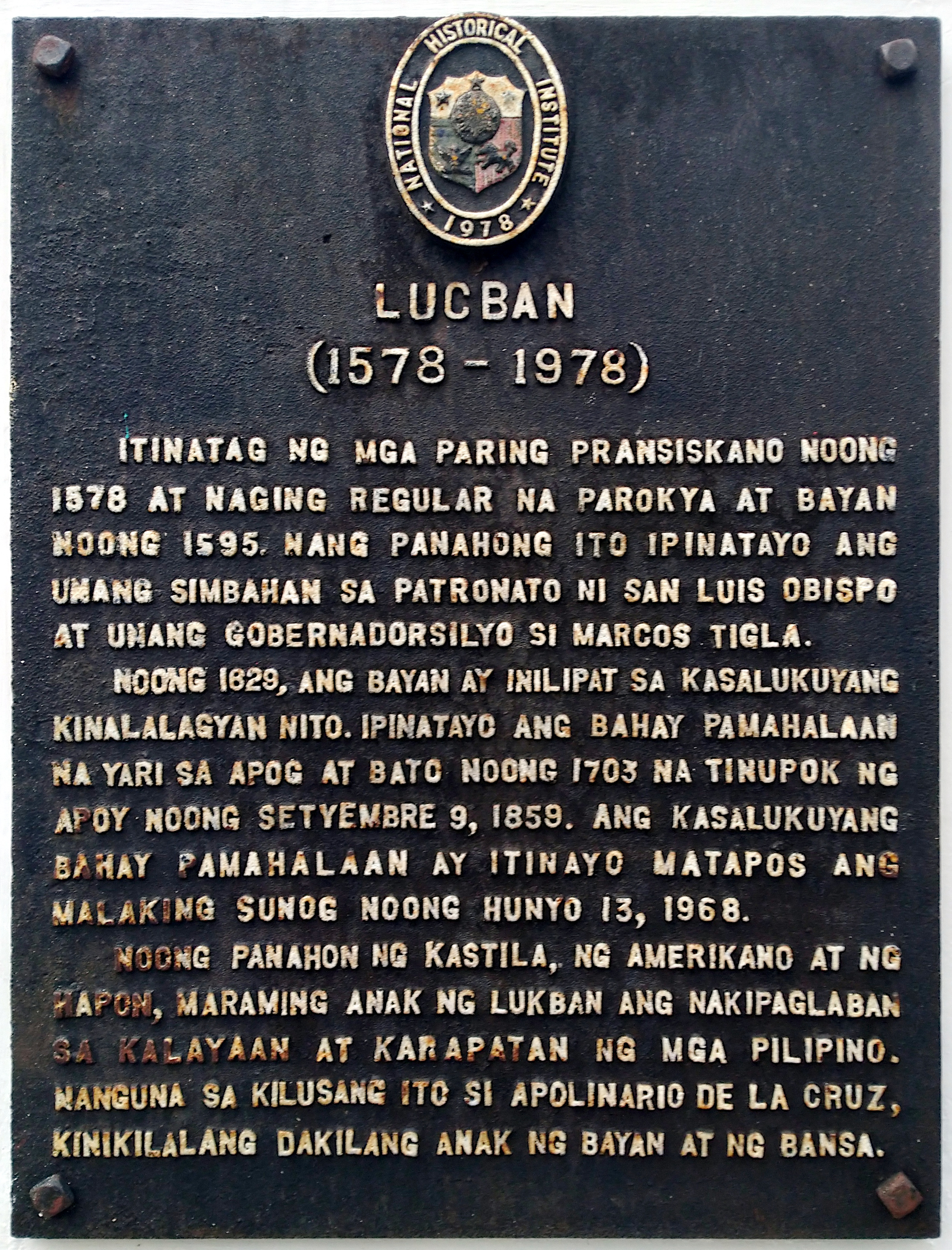
National historical marker installed at the municipal hall in 1978

=== Second World War and Japanese Occupation ===
Early in the campaign, Japanese forces invaded and occupied Lucban. On December 26, 1941, Filipino and American troops defended Barrio Piis and the attack by the Japanese shifted to the Bataan Peninsula. After Japanese forces occupied the town, they built a military garrison, and the Japanese armed forces were stationed in Lucban. Both local guerrilla and regular troops of the Philippine Commonwealth Army initiated attacks in Lucban from 1942 to 1945.

=== Sampaloc, Quezon ===
Plaza De Revolucion

Sampaloc used to be the Barrio Dingin of Lucban, Quezon consisting of three sitios. It was later renamed Sampaloc because of the presence of a large tamarind tree found in the center of the settlement during the earlier days. The name was also changed in Alfonso Trece for a time to honor the King of Spain. In 1873, Capt. Pedro Cadelina of Lucban recommended changing the barrio into a municipality but due to the lack of residents, it was only made into a “visita”. “Teniente Mayores” were appointed to head the ”visita”, the first of whom was from Polilio, followed by Arcadio Veluya, Laureano Nanola, Silverio Abueva, and Juan Saludades.

Through the efforts of Juan Pineda, Sampaloc became a municipality in 1892. He was elected as the first Capitan. He was succeeded by Diego Gagan followed by Teofilo Daya in 1901. During Daya's term in office, three more barrios from Mauban – Banot, Bilucao, and San Bueno, became a part of Sampaloc through the efforts of Ireneo Domeo, the municipal secretary. The town was also renamed to Sampaloc during this time.

== Geography ==
Lucban is 22 kilometres (14 mi) from Lucena City and 121 kilometres (75 mi) from Manila and is accessible by land from Metro Manila passing through Rizal via Manila East Road or via the South Luzon Expressway with approximately 2- to 3-hour drive.

=== Barangays ===
Lucban is politically subdivided into 32 barangays, as indicated below. Each barangay consists of puroks and some have sitios.

- Abang
- Aliliw
- Atulinao
- Ayuti (Poblacion)
- Barangay 1 (Poblacion)
- Barangay 2 (Poblacion)
- Barangay 3 (Poblacion)
- Barangay 4 (Poblacion)
- Barangay 5 (Poblacion)
- Barangay 6 (Poblacion)
- Barangay 7 (Poblacion)
- Barangay 8 (Poblacion)
- Barangay 9 (Poblacion)
- Barangay 10 (Poblacion)
- Igang
- Kabatete
- Kakawit
- Kalangay
- Kalyaat
- Kilib
- Kulapi
- Mahabang Parang
- Malupak
- Manasa
- May-It
- Nagsinamo
- Nalunao
- Palola
- Piis
- Samil
- Tiawe
- Tinamnan

=== Climate ===
Climate data for Lucban, Quezon
Month	Jan	Feb	Mar	Apr	May	Jun	Jul	Aug	Sep	Oct	Nov	Dec	Year
Mean daily maximum °C (°F)	24 (75)	25 (77)	27 (81)	29 (84)	29 (84)	28 (82)	27 (81)	26 (79)	26 (79)	26 (79)	26 (79)	24 (75)	26 (80)
Mean daily minimum °C (°F)	18 (64)	18 (64)	18 (64)	19 (66)	21 (70)	22 (72)	21 (70)	21 (70)	21 (70)	20 (68)	20 (68)	19 (66)	20 (68)
Average precipitation mm (inches)	52 (2.0)	35 (1.4)	27 (1.1)	27 (1.1)	82 (3.2)	124 (4.9)	163 (6.4)	144 (5.7)	145 (5.7)	141 (5.6)	100 (3.9)	102 (4.0)	1,142 (45)
Average rainy days	12.0	8.1	8.8	9.7	17.9	22.6	26.2	24.5	24.6	22.0	16.7	14.9	208
Source: Meteoblue

== Demographics ==
Population census of Lucban
Year	Pop.	±% p.a.
1903	10,227	—
1918	12,913	+1.57%
1939	13,976	+0.38%
1948	15,060	+0.83%
1960	17,452	+1.24%
1970	23,157	+2.87%
1975	23,044	−0.10%
1980	25,826	+2.30%
1990	30,130	+1.55%
1995	35,128	+2.92%
2000	38,834	+2.17%
2007	45,616	+2.24%
2010	46,698	+0.86%
2015	51,475	+1.87%
2020	53,091	+0.65%
2024	54,134	+0.47%
Source: Philippine Statistics Authority

== Economy ==
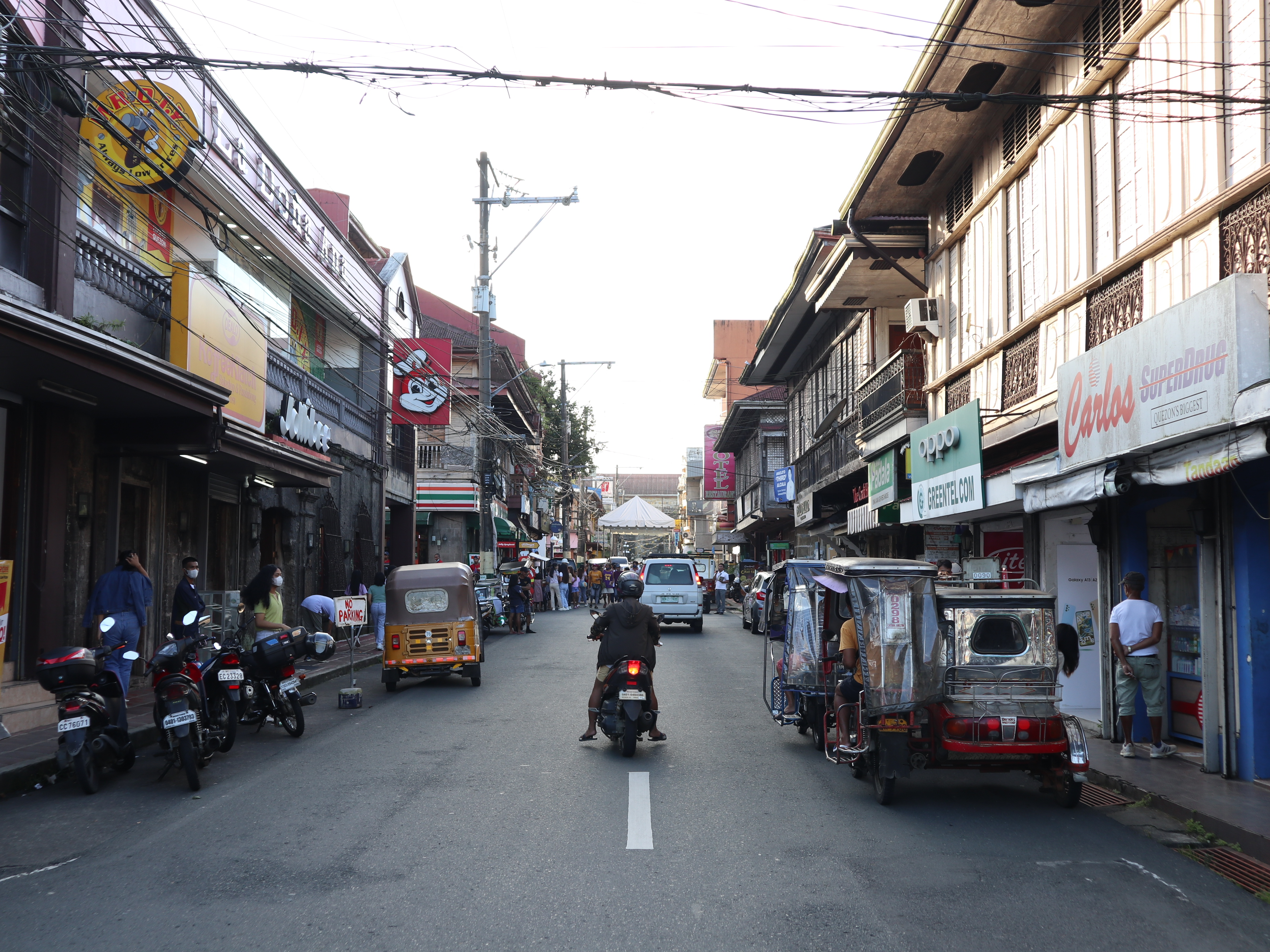
Lucban town proper

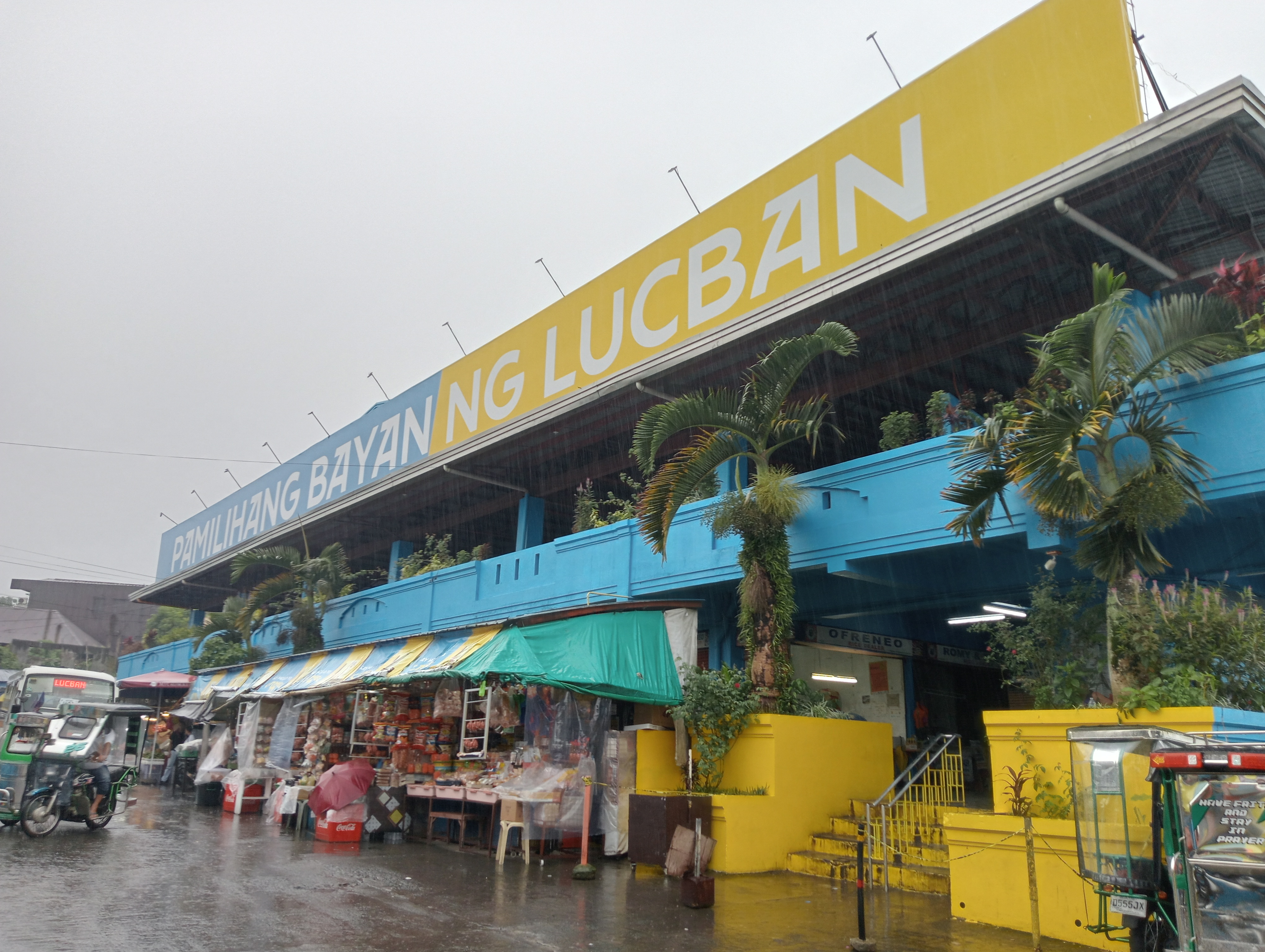
Public Market

Poverty incidence of Lucban (%)

Source: Philippine Statistics Authority

== Government ==
Lucban Municipal Hall

=== Elected officials ===
The following serve an elected term from 2025 to 2028.

Elected Municipal Officials of Lucban, Quezon
Position	Name
Mayor	Agustin M. Villaverde (PRP)
Vice Mayor	Avin Villaseñor (LP)
Councilors	Eduardo Alamo (Stan Q)
Councilors	Nyerwina Pavino (Stan Q)
Councilors	Aven Bince Rada (Stan Q)
Councilors	Faye Dominique Deveza (Stan Q)
Councilors	Pio Lim Jr. (Akay)
Councilors	Marife Hari (Stan Q)
Councilors	Mike Borines (LP)
Councilors	Freddie Martinez (Stan Q)
Councilors	Mario V. De Asis (LBP)
Councilors	Romscell Suarez (SKP)

== Culture ==
=== Pahiyas festival ===
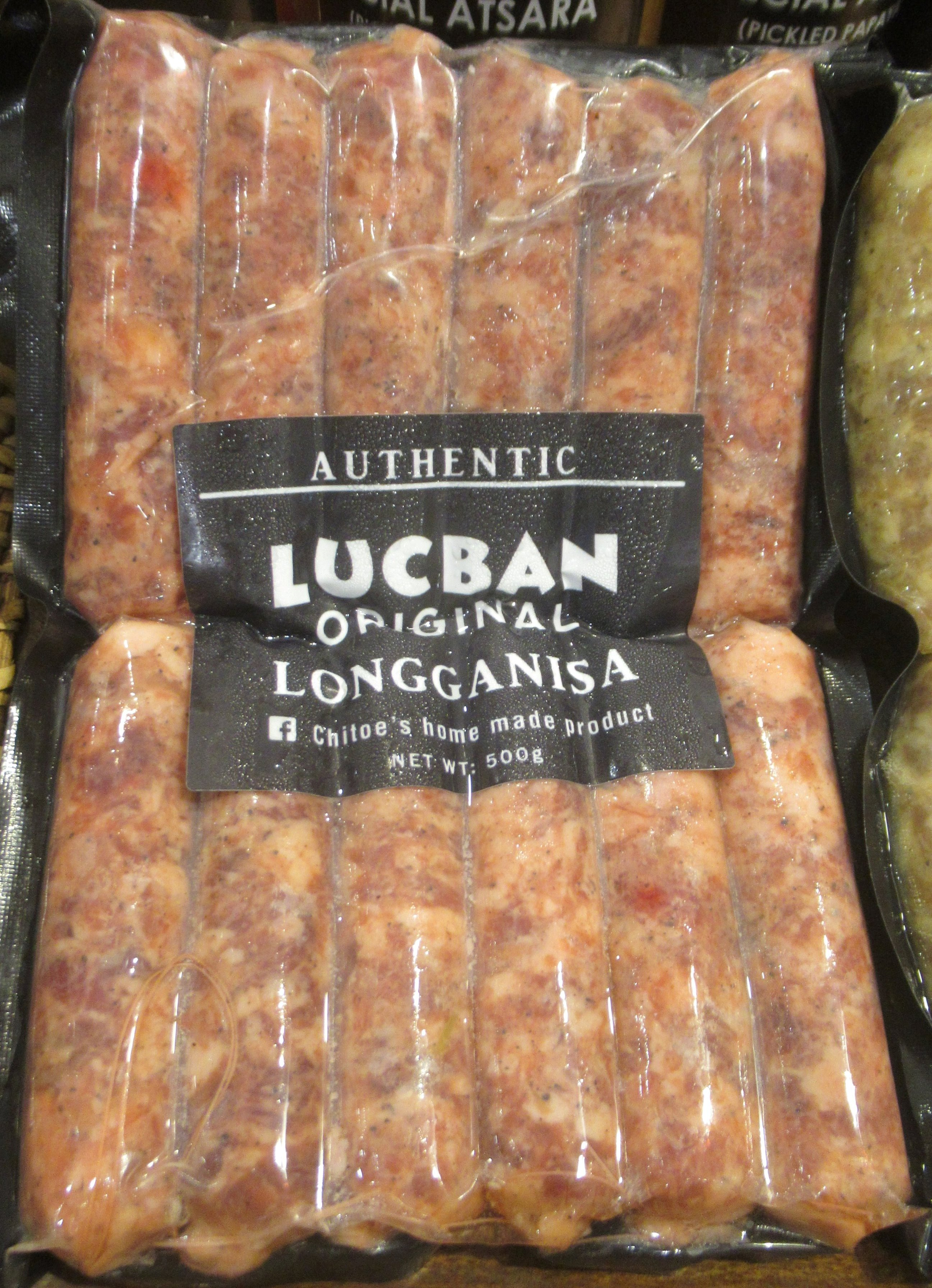
Lucban longganisa

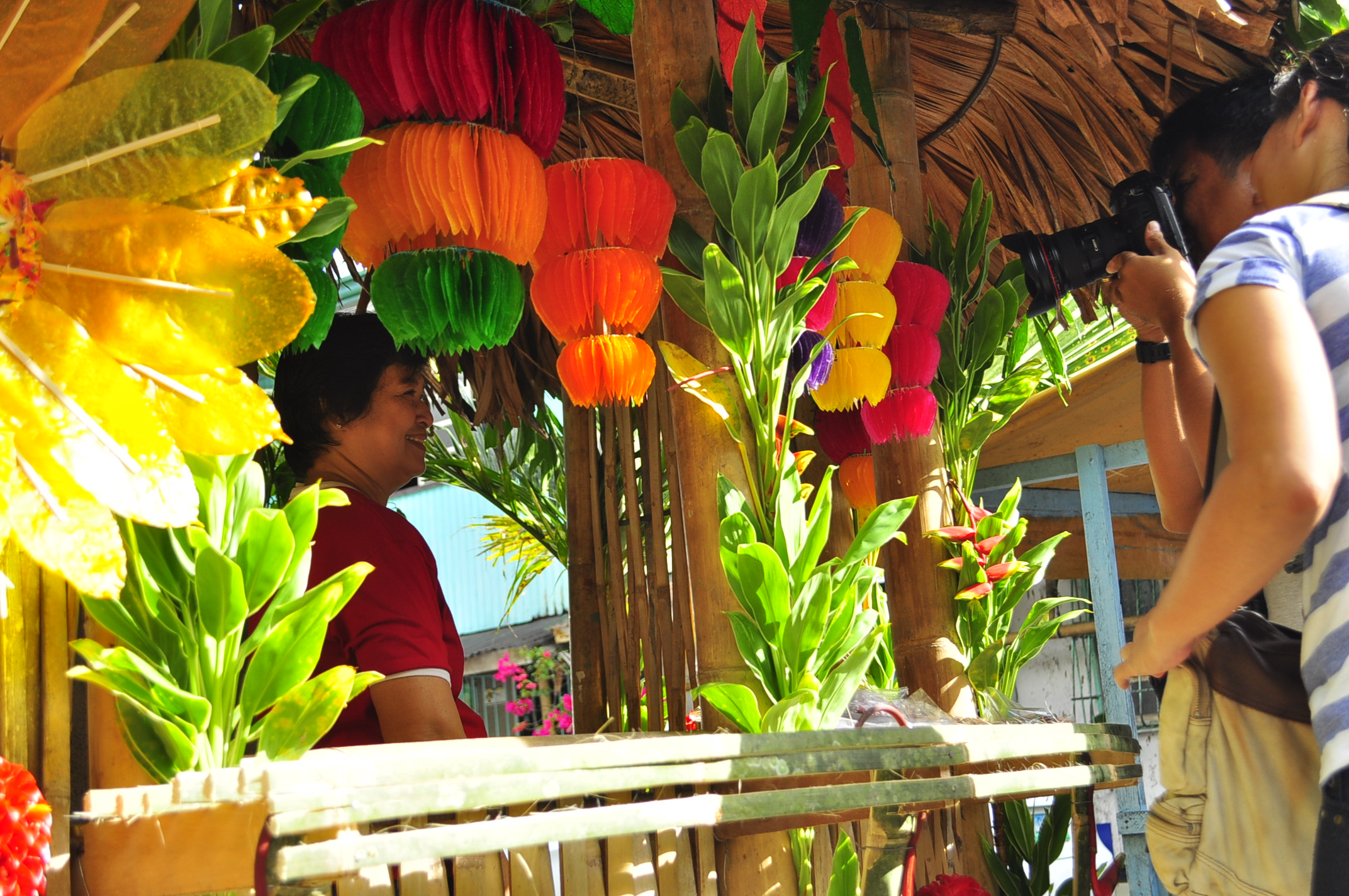
A vendor selling colorful fried kiping

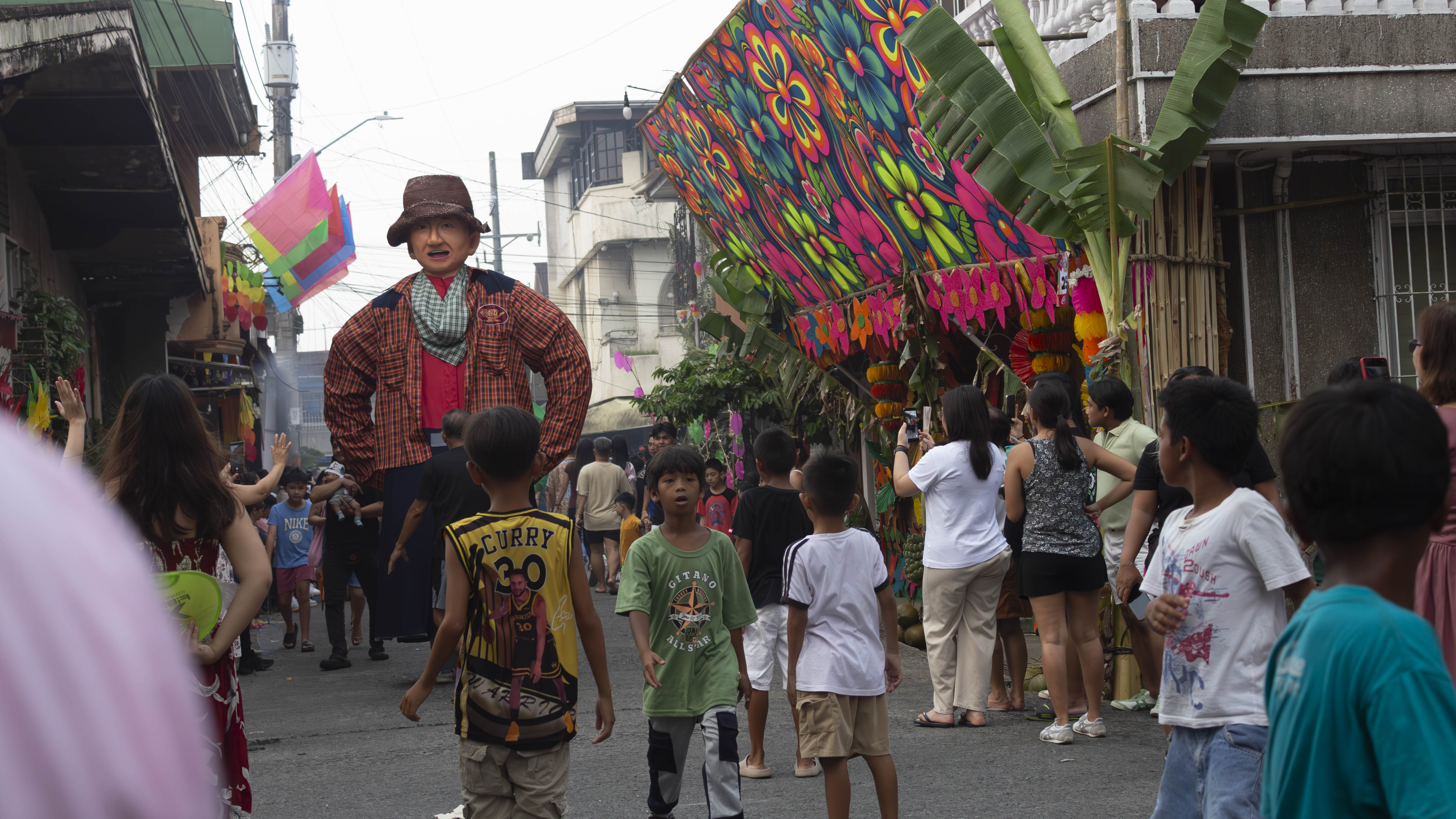
Higante Parade at the Pahiyas Festival 2026

Lucban celebrates the Pahiyas Festival every May 15 in honor of the patron saint of farmers, St Isidore the Labourer. Beginning with a 6:00am Catholic Mass at the Lucban Church, this festival showcases a street of houses which are adorned with fruits, vegetables, agricultural products, handicrafts and kiping, a rice-made decoration, which afterwards can be eaten grilled or fried. The houses are judged and the best one is proclaimed the winner. Every year, tourists roam the municipality to witness the decoration of houses. Nowadays, Pahiyas Festival is a week long celebration starting every May 15.

In the 2014 Pahiyas Festival, 40,000 Lucban longganisa were made by Rimberto Veloso, of Eker and Ely’s longganisa, including 10 commercial sausage makers, from May 12 to 19, a “one whole week of buying spree” — P150 a dozen for jumbo size and P75 for regular. The reddish sausages adorned façade of houses, stores, and public market stalls.

== Education ==
The Lucban Schools District Office governs all educational institutions within the municipality. It oversees the management and operations of all private and public, from primary to secondary schools.

=== Primary and elementary schools ===
- Casa Del Niño Jesus de Lucban
- Good Shepherd Diocesan School
- Paaralang Elementarya ng Lucban 1
- Paaralang Elementarya ng Lucban 2
- Paaralang Elementarya ng Lucban 3A
- Paaralang Elementarya ng Lucban 3B
- Paaralang Elementarya ng Lucban 4
- Paaralang Elementarya ng Lucban 5
- Paaralang Elementarya ng Lucban 6
- Paaralang Elementarya ng Lucban 7
- Paaralang Elementarya ng Lucban-Maka
- Paaralang Elementarya ng May-it Manasa
- Paaralang Elementarya ng Nagsinamo
- Paaralang Elementarya ng Nakal
- Paaralang Elementarya ng Piis
- Lucban Adventist Elementary School
- Lucban Christian School
- Steadfast Love Kiddie School

=== Secondary schools ===
- Casa del Niño Jesus de Lucban - High School
- Banahaw View Academy
- Lucban Academy
- One in Christ Church School of Lucban Inc.
- Paaralang Sekundarya ng Lucban Integrated School
- Nagsinamo National High School
- Lucban Christian School - Junior High School

=== Higher educational institutions ===
- Banahaw Technological College
- Our Lady of the Most Holy Rosary Seminary
- Southern Luzon State University

== Religious landmarks ==
Kamay ni Hesus Healing Church

- Saint Louis Bishop Parish (Lucban Church)
- Kamay ni Hesus Shrine

== Notable people ==
- Hermano Pule, religious leader who founded and led the Cofradía de San José
- Angel Lagdameo, Archbishop of the Archdiocese of Jaro and former President of the Catholic Bishops' Conference of the Philippines
- Tommy Abuel, actor
- Pauline Mendoza, actress and model
- Leo Oracion, first Filipino mountaineer to successfully reach the Mt. Everest summit
- Adrian L. Policena, also known as Chris Tsuper, popular radio personality
- Pops Fernandez, celebrity, OPM singer
- Edwin Panergo, Bishop of the Diocese of Boac
