= Chris Tsuper =

Filipino radio disc jockey (born 1979)

- Born: Adrian Lagdameo Policena; December 7, 1979 (age 46); Lucban, Quezon, Philippines
- Other names: Chris Tsuper, Chris, Adrian
- Education: Far Eastern University (BA); Ateneo de Manila University (MBA)
- Occupations: Radio Disc Jockey, Recording Artist, Events Host, Product Endorser, Digital Influencer
- Known for: 90.7 Love Radio, 100.7 Love Radio Lucena
- Political party: Akay (from 2024)
- Awards: List: 2017 Catholic Mass Media Special Citation for Best Radio Program; 2017 Platinum Stallion Media Awardee for Best Male DJ; 2017 Platinum Stallion Media Awardee for Best Radio Show; 2017 COMGUILD Media Awardee for Best Radio Program; 2017 Alta Media Icon Awardee for Best Male Radio Personality; 2017 Most Popular Tandem in Radio Kapisanan ng mga Kamag-anak ng Migranteng Pilipino; 2016 Alta Media Icon Awardee for Best Male Radio Personality; 2015 Alta Media Icon Awardee for Best Male Radio Personality; 2015 Alta Media Icon Awardee for Best Radio Program; 2013 Yahoo! OMG! Awardee for Best Radio Show; 2013 Star Brand Awardee for Best Male Radio Host; 2010 Top Brand Most Outstanding Radio DJ; 2009 People's Choice Awardee for Most Outstanding Male Radio DJ; 40th Guillermo Mendoza Memorial Scholarship Foundation Awardee for Most Popular Novelty Singer; PMPC Star Awards for Music Nominee for Best Novelty Artist and Best Novelty Album; 23rd Awit Awards Nominee for Best Novelty and Best Christmas Song Categories; 9th Gawad Tanglaw Awardee for Best FM Radio DJ

Adrian Lagdameo Policena (born December 7, 1979), known professionally as Chris Tsuper and formerly Carlo Valentino, is radio disc jockey and recording artist in the Philippines. He is best known for his longtime radio program Tambalan (with co-host Nicole Hyala) on 90.7 Love Radio Manila and other Love Radio stations nationwide.

== Early life ==
Policena took his primary and secondary education in his hometown of Lucban, Quezon. He is also a graduate of Mass Communication at Far Eastern University. When he headed back to Quezon, he was discovered by Lady Love, the station manager of 100.7 Love Radio Lucena. Thus he began to work as "Carlo Valentino" at that station. A year later, he moved to Love Radio Manila upon being discovered by Wilfredo Espinosa, Love Radio Manila's program director.

== Career ==
Policena, also known as Love Radio Manila's "Chris Tsuper", is a KBP (Kapisanan ng mga Broadkaster ng Pilipinas) accredited radio announcer, a recording artist, and one of the most sought after product endorsers in Philippine radio today. He is best known for his top-rated morning program Tambalan along with Nicole Hyala aired over 90.7 Love Radio Manila and Love Radio stations nationwide. Tambalan is not a typical radio program with two people conversing with each other; rather it engages listeners who have the chance to air out their problems. With Tambalan's special segment, "Ang Kwento ng Mahiwagang Burnay", deals with different human experiences that listeners can relate to— be it bad, silly, exciting, funny, remorseful, or embarrassing— and can make them smile or even laugh.

Aside from the program Tambalan, Chris and co-host Nicole have branched out into recording albums with lyrics that reflect their on-air antics and vibrancy. These songs showcase the relatable everyday Filipino experiences that they feature in their show, Tambalan.

And the entertainment does not stop on air or in albums. Chris has co-authored the number one best-selling book "Tambalan". Due to their success on FM radio, he and Nicole crossed-over to television, as the additional hosts of the Saturday morning edition of Music Uplate Live on ABS-CBN. in 2009. He also became one of the hosts of the prime noontime show Eat Bulaga "Spogify: The Singing Baes" and "Grabe S'ya!" in 2015 to 2016.

In October 2024, he ended teaming up with Nicole Hyala after 20 years to pursue a political career and to focus on his family living in Quezon. He ran for councilor of Lucban in 2025 under Akay National Political Party, but lost, placing 9th and thus outside of the top 8.

== Discography ==
=== Albums ===
- Hey Tambalan Na! (D' Nakakalurkei na Album) (2007)
- Hey Tambalan Na! (‘D Mas Nakakalurkei Na Album) (2009)
- Hey Tambalan Na! (’D Pinaka Nakakalurkei Na Album) (2009)

== Filmography ==
Year	Title	Role	Notes
2013	Eat Bulaga!	Himself	Guest player for Hakot Pa More segment
2015-2016	Eat Bulaga!	Himself	Features in Spogify featuring Singing Baes
2020	Eat Bulaga!	Himself	Bawal Judgemental Contestant
2023	E.A.T.	Himself	Guest player for Babala! 'Wag Kayong Ganuuun...

== Awards ==
	Award-Giving Body	Category	Work	Result
2011	GMMSF Box-Office Entertainment Awards	Most Popular Novelty Singers (with Nicole Hyala)		Won
