= Ballet Manila =

Dance company in the Philippines

General information
- Name: Ballet Manila
- Year founded: 1995
- Principal venue: Pasay, Philippines
- Website: balletmanila.com.ph

Artistic staff
- Artistic director: Lisa Macuja-Elizalde (Artistic Director and Principal Dancer)
- Resident choreographers: Gerardo Francisco (Resident Choreographer and Rehearsal Master for Modern Dance)
- Other Artistic Staff: Osias Barroso (Artistic Associate & Rehearsal Master); Jonathan Janolo (Assistant Ballet Master/Set & Costume Designer); Eileen Lopez (Assistant Rehearsal Mistress)

Other
- Associated schools: Vaganova Ballet Academy
- Formation: Principal; Jr. Principal; Senior Soloist; Soloist; Demi Soloist; Company Member; Company Apprentice; Company Scholars

Ballet Manila is a classical ballet institution and dance company in the Philippines. It currently highlights more than fifty highly trained dancers in the highly rigorous Russian (Vaganova) method of classical ballet. Locally the company has performed in 47 cities holding more than 4,100 performances. The company has done tours in Asia, Europe and North America, where it has held more than 140 performances. The company is most notable for its in-house creative director, principal dancer and prima ballerina Lisa Macuja-Elizalde. Along with Ballet Philippines and the Philippine Ballet Theatre, Ballet Manila is one of the three major ballet companies in the Philippines. It regularly held its performances at the Aliw theater and Star Theater which were damaged by a fire in 2019, which are both located within Star City at Pasay. The concept of a ballet company by the dancers, of the dancers and for the dancers was the idea of Lisa Macuja-Elizalde when she, along with ballet master Osias Barroso and ten other dancers established Ballet Manila in 1995.

== Repertoire ==
Ballet Manila has featured full-length performances of Swan Lake, Don Quixote, The Nutcracker, Giselle, La Bayadere, Romeo and Juliet, Carmen, Le Corsaire, and other classical staples, as well as contemporary Filipino ballet pieces by some of the Philippines most distinguished choreographers. Ballet Manila has also performed non-classical pieces such as the major production piece Tatlong Kuwento ni Lola Basyang (The three stories of Grandmother Basyang). The company also performs short non-classical pieces which they perform at the Star City amusement center to cater to the masses, such pieces include Paskong Pista (Christmas Fiesta) and Hi-skul Musikahan which directly translates and is also a Filipino ballet rendition of High School Musical. The company's season runs from April to February of the following year, where they do four major productions annually. Ballet Manila's major production calendar for 2011 includes Tatlong Kuwento ni Lola Basyang in August, Swan Lake in October, Maligayang Pasko (Happy Christmas) in December and Love ko to (I love this) in February 2012.

Ballet Manila's tie-up with Manila Broadcasting Company has paved the way for the concert series “Ballet and Ballads” where the show features the artistic merger of pop songs and classical dance. To date, Ballet Manila has done collaborations with the bands’ Side A and Freestyle, as well as musicians Ariel Rivera, Lani Misalucha, Janno Gibbs, Jaya, Luke Mijares, Karylle, Toni Gonzaga, Kyla and Nyoy Volante.

=== “Of Hope and Homecoming” ===
Ballet Manila, in partnership with Areté hosted Martin Lawrance's Filipino iteration of “Romeo + Juliet” at Hyundai Hall in Areté from 16 to 17 September 2023, as part of its concluded 25th performance season “Of Hope and Homecoming.”

=== "Ballet Master Pieces" ===
On January 31, 2024, Lisa Macuja-Elizalde announced at Aliw Theater, Ballet Manila's 2024 events in its 26th ballet season "Ballet Master Pieces." Lisa's "Le Corsaire (The Pirate)" opened the season on February 24–25. With partner partner Anvil Publishing, the dance adaptation of "Tatlong Kuwento ni Lola Basyang" which started in 2008 will be performed on May 11, May 12 and 18 at Aliw Theater. Mga Kuwento ni Lola Basyang includes "Ang Prinsipe ng mga Ibon", "Ang Kapatid ng Tatlong Maria", and "Ang Mahiwagang Biyulin". In the portrayal, Comedian Mitch Valdez', now in her 53rd year in show business, unlike Luz Fernandez, will "move around with the dancers" and will present a modern, “groovier” and “more hip” Lola Basyang, wearing a daster.

The season will end with Giselle, on August 31 and September 3, followed by premieres of Florante at Laura with a modern Ang Ibong Adarna and finally Snow White.

=== International tours ===
Ballet Manila has performed in international tours, more than 140 times since 1995. Notable tours include their United States tour of 2004 & 2005, their participation in the Aberdeen International Youth Festival in 2004, the Angkor-Gyeongju World Culture Expo in Cambodia, Gyeongju World Performing arts festival in South Korea and tours in Russia, Taiwan, United Kingdom and Ireland. Ballet Manila received good raves and high praises in their performances of a recent 2011 United Kingdom and Ireland tour. The Philippine delegation was cited for performing difficult pieces such as Don Quixote, Alberto Dimarucut's "Dulce", Aguila (Eagle dance), Mga Awit at Savaw (Dances & songs), Arachnida (Spider dance), Sotto Voce, Arnis (Philippine stick-fighting combat art), Reve and excerpts from Romeo and Juliet. The company was said to have received eight standing ovations in all of its eight performances in the same tour. The company performed in the Venetian Theatre in Macau in June 2013.

== Ballet Manila School ==
Ballet Manila School started as a spin-off from the “Lisa Macuja Summer Workshop” which was originally conducted in the summer of 1995. Previously, the classes were held at the old Ballet Manila Studio which was located in Quezon city. The pilot class performed their first piece entitled Etudes in June 1996. The company officially opened its own summer workshops in April 1997, this time at the permanent facility, where the first enrollees were thirty six students. The Ballet Manila School has direct links with the Vaganova Academy of Russian Ballet in St. Petersburg, Russia. Here, the students are trained in the vaganova ballet methodology. The classes held at this school are split into five levels from 3 levels for girls, namely beginner, intermediate and finally to advance. The boy's levels however are only split into beginners and advance classes. From the time that the school opened, it has held several auditions wherein the company offers full and half scholarships to those who would successfully pass the screening. In previous years ballet was predominantly still viewed as a female art form until recently wherein more people are now more appreciative of ballet which opened the opportunity for more male dancers to enroll at the institution.

== Facility ==
Since then, the company opened up a facility located at Donada street within Pasay. The private compound currently has three rehearsal studios, a music library which houses a collection of books and videos which sole purpose is to ensure that the dancers and students are given continuous education. The company also holds ballet workshops during summers, this is done on top of the professional training and regular master classes for the company. Aside from the school, Ballet Manila is also equipped with a fully staffed office which provides marketing, logistical and administrative requirements for the company.

== Advocacy ==
Project Ballet Futures (PBF) is a dance scholarship program established by Ballet Manila in 2008. It provides quality ballet education and training to elementary and high school students enrolled in public schools. As of 2011, the project has thirty-five underprivileged students from the Philippine Christian Foundation in Tondo, Manila and Gotamco Elementary School and Bonifacio Elementary School in Pasay. Along with ballet education, they are also given full meals, vitamins and other nourishment good for six days of the week, as well as ballet uniforms and shoes. The kids are chosen through an audition, where the successful ones are given daily ballet class training in an accelerated dance program. In a 2010 interview with Macuja-Elizalde, she said that one of the first male scholar was the Macuja family's house boy, the late Rolando Tagaro. Tagaro then went on to become the company's costume master where he was earning enough to send money back to his family in the province and send several children to school.

== Lisa Macuja-Elizalde's retirement ==
In March 2010, it was reported that Lisa Macuja-Elizalde had sustained minor injuries during rehearsal. This prompted the cancellation of several shows that year. Upon consulting her physician, she underwent surgery to release her tendons in December 2011. Despite being able to walk a day after checking out of the hospital, she acknowledged that she might only have three to four years left before she finally retires from dancing. Subsequently, Macuja-Elizalde underwent another operation in August 2011, this time it was to correct her plantar fasciitis problem. In early September of the same year, Macuja-Elizalde announced that she will dance her last full-length Swan Lake in a series of shows scheduled in October 2011. She stated that she would eventually concentrate on being the company's artistic director after a series of farewell performances.

== Notable members ==
- Lisa Macuja-Elizalde
- Osias Barroso
- Mylene Agabao-Salgado
- Eileen Lopez
- Jerome Espejo
- Rudy de Dios
- Gerardo Francisco Jr.
- Niño Guevarra
- Zaira Cosico
- Jennifer Olayvar
