= Jennifer Olayvar =

Jennifer Rose Olayvar
- Born: Jennifer Rose Olayvar; 4 October; Philippines
- Known for: Ballet
- Movement: Classical
- Awards: 2012 Gawad Buhay Awards nominee for Female Lead Performance in a Classical Production (Giselle) and Female Lead Performance in a Modern Production (Sinderela)

Jennifer Rose Olayvar is a ballerina from the Republic of the Philippines. She was a dancer for Ballet Manila from 2000 to 2013. She became the Special Assistant to Lisa Macuja-Elizalde from 2004 to 2007. Olayvar has taken minor and intermediate examinations for the Royal Academy of Dance London.

== Career ==
Olayvar studied ballet at Goldcrest Dance Workshop under the tutelage of Jinggay Formoso and Josette Salang. In 1995, she transferred to Steps Dance Studio where she trained with Sofia Zobel de Ayala-Elizalde and Raul Sauz. At Steps, she has danced the lead roles of many of its shows including the Sugar Plum Fairy for "The Nutcracker", Princess Aurora for "Sleeping Beauty" and Olivia for "Olivia the Octopus Princess". Olayvar came to the attention of Ballet Manila when she was able to get the principal role of Giselle in July 2000 when the Royal Academy of Dance (RAD) held local auditions in the Philippines. She joined Ballet Manila right after where she stayed with the company until 2007 but returned after a year of absence. In an interview with Pointe Magazine, about the support for the arts, Olayvar pointed out that Ballet Manila is not state funded and the dancers do not have contracts, instead they are paid from the troupe's performances.

== Notable performances ==
Olayvar has danced the principal roles of Lise in "La Fille Mal Gardee", Kitri in "Don Quixote Grand Pas", Giselle in "Giselle", Gulnara in "Le Corsaire", Micaela in "Carmen" and Cinderella in "Cinderella". She was a Muslim princess for "Sayaw sa Pamlang" (dance with the bamboos), the other half of Agnes Locsin's intense and sensual pas de deux "Arachnida" (mating spiders) and Bam Damian's "Widmung", a dance choreographed to Jennifer and her partner Romeo Peralta. In 2008, during the visit of guest choreographer and People's Artist of Russia title holder Sergey Vikulov Olayvar was one of the dancers selected to perform the lead role of "Lise" in La Fille Mal Gardée (The Naughty Daughter).

Jennifer has joined the company's performances for La Bayadere, Romeo & Juliet, Carmen, Don Quixote, Paquita, Firebird, Nutcracker, Le Corsaire, La Fille Mal Gardee, Swan Lake, Pinocchio and Giselle. She has traveled and performed with the company during its 2004 Aberdeen International Youth Festival in Scotland, the 2004 & 2005 United States Tour, the 2005 8th Asia Arts Festival in China, the 2005 Andong Mask Dance Festival in South Korea, the 2005 Russia Tour, the 2006 Angkor-Gyeongju World Culture Expo in Cambodia, and the 2011 England, Ireland, and South Korea Tour and with its performances within the Philippines bringing her from Baguio to Zamboanga. Representing Ballet Manila, Jennifer has also participated in an arts appreciation program of the Cultural Center of the Philippines (CCP) with Sopas, Sining at Sorbetes, an outreach program for the underprivileged communities in the country.

In 2012, she was a Gawad Buhay Awards nominated Female Lead Performer for two categories - the Female Lead Performer in a Classical Production (for Giselle), where she was up against her mentor and the Philippines' Prima Ballerina Lisa Macuja, and the Female Lead Performer in a Modern Production (for Sinderela).

== Personal life ==
Jennifer Rose Olayvar is the eldest of two daughters of DLTB Co. SVP James Olayvar and Landbank AVP Emerita Estonina. Jennifer is a bachelor's degree graduate majoring in International Studies from De La Salle University where her undergraduate thesis in which she got a perfect score of 4.0 was about the comparative study of ballet in the Philippines and Russia. Olayvar was also an active cheerleader of the Pep Squad organization in DLSU. When she left Ballet Manila in 2007 to pursue a different career path, she got accepted to be in the 1st batch of Filipino flight crew members of AirAsia (from over 600 applicants, it went down to less than 15 potential flight attendants). She was about to be deployed in Kuala Lumpur, Malaysia for the next 3 years. However, after 5 months of absence in the dance circuit, she came back performing with Ballet Manila. The dance bug bit her as she fondly says. In her years with Ballet Manila (2000–2013), she has become the Special Assistant to the Chief of Staff, a faculty staff member of the Ballet Manila School and a Marketing Consultant. In February 2013, she has nailed a major project for Ballet Manila, bringing the dance company to Macau for the 113th Philippine Independence Day celebration and the 2012-2013 Years of Friendly Exchanges between the Philippines and China.

Olayvar has always been the athletic type – enjoying football in her high school alma mater at the Colegio San Agustin (CSA) in Dasmarinas Village, Makati. Being a team varsity of the CSA Soccer team and a pioneer of the Boosters (cheerleading varsity) squad, she also played for Makati Football School and had been a part of the champion team during the 1997 Metro Manila Girls Football Association, the 1st Alaska Soccer Cup, and many more. She was part of the Philippine soccer youth team who played in international football tournaments – the Helsinki Cup in Finland, the Gothia Cup (described to be the "World Cup" for the youth) in Sweden and the Pondus Cup in Denmark.

Olayvar is now married to former Pacific Islands Club Guam Executive Sous Chef Jerome Espejo. The couple is now based in Perth, Western Australia. For the meantime, they enjoy doing yoga and taking ballet classes together, as well as traveling the world when their schedule permits.
