= Mga Kuwento ni Lola Basyang =

Short story collection

- Short story by Severino Reyes
- Country: Philippines
- Language: Tagalog

Publication
- Published in: Liwayway
- Publication type: Anthology
- Publication date: 1925

Mga Kuwento ni Lola Basyang (Tagalog, lit. 'The Stories of Grandmother Basyang') is an anthology of short stories written by "Lola Basyang," the pen name of Severino Reyes, founder and editor of the Tagalog magazine, Liwayway. The original magazine stories have since been adapted into books, comics, television, and film.

== Work ==
In 1925, Severino Reyes wrote a series of short stories under the series title Mga Kuwento ni Lola Basyang for Liwayway, the Tagalog-language magazine. The stories by Reyes were published under the pen name "Lola Basyang".

=== Lola Basyang ===
Lola Basyang
- First appearance: Mga Kuwento ni Lola Basyang; 1925
- Last appearance: LolaBasyang.com; 2015
- Created by: Severino Reyes

Mga Kuwento ni Lola Basyang featured the character Lola Basyang who is characterized as an elderly woman fond of telling stories to her grandchildren. The character is based on Gervacia Guzman de Zamora, a neighbor of author Severino Reyes, who was the matriarch of the Zamora family of Quiapo, Manila. According to the National Historical Commission of the Philippines, the name Lola Basyang became a "generic" or placeholder name for old Filipino grandmothers with the same traits as the fictional character.

== Adaptations ==
=== Comics ===
Lola Basyang was featured in illustrated form in Tagalog Klasiks. a komiks which had its first issue released in 1949. The story of was rewritten by Severino Reyes' son Pedrito and was llustrated by Jesus Ramos, and later on, Ruben Yandoc.

=== Feature film ===
Sampaguita Pictures produced a film adaptation of Lola Basyang in 1958. The film is an anthology adapted from two short stories. Regal Films released their own film in 1985, which featured three stories. Mga Kuwento Ni Lola Basyang of Unitel Pictures was originally among the official entries of the 2012 Metro Manila Film Festival. However the film was left unreleased and was replaced by Thy Womb.

=== Miniseries ===
LolaBasyang.com is a modern adaptation of Mga Kuwento ni Lola Basyang produced by and released in TV5 as a television miniseries. The miniseries was first released in 2015. The adaptation starred Boots Anson-Roa as Lola B, an internet blogger who tells stories to her grandchildren via webcam.

=== Repertoire ===
On January 31, 2024, Lisa Macuja-Elizalde announced at Aliw Theater, Ballet Manila's 2024 events in its 26th ballet season "Ballet Master Pieces." Lisa's "Le Corsaire (The Pirate)" opened the season on February 24–25. With partner partner Anvil Publishing, the dance adaptation of "Tatlong Kuwento ni Lola Basyang" which started in 2008 will be performed on May 11, May 12 and 18. Mga Kuwento ni Lola Basyang includes "Ang Prinsipe ng mga Ibon", "Ang Kapatid ng Tatlong Maria", and "Ang Mahiwagang Biyulin".

== See also ==
- Mga Kuwento ni Lola Basyang (TV program)
