= Aliw =

Aliw may refer to:

- Aliw Broadcasting Corporation, Philippine broadcast network
  - Aliw Channel 23, its television station
- Aliw Theater, events venue located in Pasay, Metro Manila, Philippines.
