= Zaira Cosico =

- Born: Zaira Cosico; Quezon City, Philippines
- Known for: Ballet
- Notable work: Don Quixote, Swan Lake, Giselle, La Bayadère, The Nutcracker, Carmen Tatlong Kwento Ni Lola Basyang and other Philippine contemporary ballets
- Movement: Classical
- Awards: Bronze Medalist, 2008 National Music Competition for Young Artists (NAMCYA)

Zaira Cosico is a ballerina from the Philippines. She is one of a few successful scholars of Liza Macuja's dance company, Ballet Manila. She first learned to dance at the Halili Cruz School of Dance. Cosico has been instructed in the Vaganova method by Tatiana A. Udalenkova of the Academy of Russia Ballet (Vaganova Choreographic Institute). She has also worked with Viktor Savaliev, Sergey Vikulov and Evgeny Scherbakov.

== Notable performances ==
Cosico's most notable performance was in a ballet version of Pinocchio, in which she portrayed the Blue Fairy; however, during the entire performance, she was wearing a white tutu.

In her career she has joined Ballet Manila in their European tours in Russia (2001 & 2005) and Scotland at the 2004 Aberdeen International Youth Festival. She has also joined the company's Asian performances, particularly in the 2005 Andong International Mask Dance & Folk Arts Festival in South Korea, the 2006 Angkor-Gyeongju World Culture Expo in Cambodia, the 2007 Gyeongju World Performing Arts Festival 2007 held in Gyeongju, South Korea and most recently the Nan-Ying International Folklore Festival 2007 in Nan-Ying, Taiwan.

== Awards ==
In 2008, Cosico won third prize in the National Music Competition for Young Artists (NAMCYA) Senior Division.
