= Mykola Kanevets =

Mykola Kanevets Микола Канівець
- Citizenship: Canadian
- Occupations: Artistic Director and Ballet Master
- Writing career
- Subject: Ukrainian Folk Dancing
- Notable awards: Arts Achievement Award (2001); RISE Award (2005); Maestro Academic Diploma Award (2012); Queen Elizabeth II Diamond Jubilee Medal (2012); Pavlo Virsky Medal (2013)
- Website: cheremosh.ca

Mykola Kanevets (Ukrainian: Микола Канівець), is the Artistic Director and Ballet Master of the Cheremosh Ukrainian Dance Company in Edmonton, Alberta, Canada.

== Life and career ==
A native of Kyiv, Ukraine, Mykola attended the National University of Culture and Performing Arts in Kyiv, Ukraine where he graduated from the Faculty of Choreography with the distinction of Ballet Master and Choreographer. During his studies, Mykola had the opportunity to develop his dancing skills with the world-famous Virsky Studio, where he traveled throughout Europe with them. This experience, along with the training he received from such Ukrainian dance icons as Apukhtin, Virska, Zaitstev and Vasylenko.

Mykola first began to work with Cheremosh in 1991. Over the years, Mykola has created and staged numerous dance programs, such as Cheremosh's western Alberta Tour (1992–1993), Cheremosh's participation at the Aberdeen International Youth Festival in Scotland (1996 and 2000) and the International Folk Dance Festival in Idaho (2002). Mykola also choreographed Cheremosh's 30th Anniversary tour production “New Beginnings” (1999), as well as, “Cheremosh… Revolutions!” (2005), “Canadian Dance Steps: Journey to the Great Wall” in 2007 and Cheremosh's 40th anniversary production "The Art of Cheremosh".

In June 2001, Mykola received the City of Edmonton's prestigious Arts Achievement Award. The award recognized his dedication and achievements as Cheremosh's Artistic Director and was a testament to his hard work and unsurpassed choreography.
