= Star City fire =

2019 fire in Pasay, Philippines

- Date: October 2, 2019; 6 years ago
- Duration: 14 hours
- Venue: Star City and Manila Broadcasting Company building
- Location: Pasay, Metro Manila, Philippines; 14.556°N 120.9859°E
- Type: Fire
- Cause: Electrical fire
- Outcome: 80 percent of Star City burned
- Deaths: None
- Property damage: ~₱1 billion (US$19.3 million)

A fire at Star City, an amusement park in Pasay, Metro Manila, Philippines, occurred at midnight on October 2, 2019. Initial investigation determined the cause as arson, citing traces of gasoline detected in the remains of the building. In December 2019, however, the cause was confirmed as an electrical fire which originated from a game booth on Star City's ground floor. Although there were no reported casualties, 80 percent of the establishment was confirmed to have been damaged by the fire, the cost of which was estimated to be ₱1 billion (US$19.3 million). The management of Star City announced that it would engage in a year-long rehabilitation effort before reopening the amusement park.

== Incident ==
The fire started at 12:22 a.m. when the amusement park had closed after its operation the previous day. The fire spread two hours later, prompting the Bureau of Fire Protection (BFP) to raise the alarm status to Task Force Bravo, which sent 19 fire trucks to the site. The adjacent Manila Broadcasting Company (MBC) building was also affected by the fire. The fire, which lasted 14 hours, was put under control at 4:32 a.m. and was declared "fire out" at 2:02 p.m.; at least 70 fire trucks responded to the incident. There were no casualties reported.

== Investigation ==
The BFP assembled a team of investigators to probe the cause and extent of the fire. Their initial investigation cited an electrical fault and arson as possible causes, which were believed to have started in the stockroom where inflammable materials, such as stuffed toys, were kept. Different parts of the amusement park were also noted to have been set ablaze simultaneously. The arson angle was brought to light after authorities suspected that the fire may have been perpetrated by disgruntled employees. It was also initially linked to a tweet, which stated, "Star City is dying", written before the fire. It was later revealed that the tweet's poster, a 12-year-old boy, referred to the fictional Star City by DC Comics. The management would later rule out the tweet's connection to the fire.

On October 6, 2019, authorities determined the cause as arson after traces of gasoline were detected "in an area where it should not be". Additional factors that suggested arson were the detected char pattern and irregular bend of metals, as well as the fire spreading in two directions: toward the entrance of Star City and the MBC building. Star City officials, including a tenant and his personnel, have become the subject of investigation. According to a local fire marshal, the tenant and his unlogged personnel were spotted entering the premises with sacks of cotton on the day of the fire. The management, however, denied the arson claim, believing the fire to be unintentional, and criticized the fire officials' findings as "irresponsible". The management explained that the gasoline was brought in to fuel their bumper boats and that the tenant's action was a standard procedure as cotton was used as stuffing for the plush toys offered as prizes in some games. It also denied the alleged criminal motive of the employees, explaining that the business was lucrative, especially during the Christmas season. Despite its protests, the management has vowed to cooperate in the probe.

On December 27, 2019, the BFP spokesperson identified the cause as an electrical fire due to the overheating of one of the light ballasts from a game booth on Star City's ground floor.

== Aftermath ==
Star City entrance in December 2020, around a year after the fire

Around 80 per cent of Star City was destroyed by the fire. The management estimates that the fire caused ₱1 billion (US$19.3 million) worth of damage, while the BFP provisionally pegs their estimate at ₱15 million (US$290,000). Twenty-five rides and attractions were reported to have been destroyed, including the Gabi ng Lagim (transl. Night of Terror), Dungeon of Terror, Bump Car Smash, Snow World, and Star Theater. Attractions outside the complex were intact, including Star City's proprietary Star Flyer roller coaster and the Giant Star Wheel. The park's entrance foyer, the facade of the MBC building, and the seats and stage of the Aliw Theater also survived the fire.

The management announced that it would engage in a year-long rehabilitation effort, including the importation of new rides and the reconstruction of the park, until Star City is reopened by October 2020; however, there were plans to partially reopen within 2019, depending on the assessment on the damage caused. MBC, which runs the AM radio station DZRH, television news channel DZRH News Television and FM stations 90.7 Love Radio, 101.1 Yes The Best, 96.3 Easy Rock and Radyo Natin, were able to resume operations using its secondary facilities at the BSA Twin Towers in Mandaluyong for its FM stations, and in Valenzuela and Bulacan for its AM stations.

The venues for Ballet Manila's scheduled performance of Giselle were moved from the Aliw and Star Theaters to the Cultural Center of the Philippines Complex. MNL48's three concerts, set to take place at the Star Theater in October 2019, were moved to different venues. The MBC's National Choral Competitions, which were also set to take place at the Star Theater in December 2019, were also cancelled.

Martin Andanar, Secretary of the Presidential Communications Operations Office, has urged government agencies to provide assistance to both Star City employees and the Manila Broadcasting Company. Presidential spokesperson Salvador Panelo, on behalf of the national government, expressed grief over the incident. The Department of Labor and Employment, under its Tulong Panghanapbuhay sa Ating Disadvantaged/Displaced Workers (TUPAD; transl. Aid to the Livelihood of Our Disadvantaged/Displaced Workers) program, allocated ₱5.5 million (US$106,139) emergency assistance for 500 employees who were affected by the fire.

On November 15, 2021, after a 2-year hiatus, MBC studios and offices returned to the newly renovated MBC Building inside the Star City complex, except for DZRH, which moved on December 17, 2021.

On January 5, 2022, Star City announced through their Facebook page that they would have their "soft [re]opening" on January 14, 2022. However, the opening was postponed due to an increase in COVID-19 cases in Metro Manila brought by the Omicron variant amidst a pandemic of the disease that reached the metropolis in early 2020. After some delays, the park reopened on February 24, 2022.

== See also ==
- List of fires
- Other notable fires in the Philippines
  - Ozone Disco fire, 1996, 162 dead
  - Kentex slipper factory fire, 2015, 74 dead
  - 2017 Davao City mall fire, 39 dead
