= Star City (amusement park) =

Amusement park in the Philippines

- The outer facade of the entrance building, pictured in 2020
- Interactive map of Star City
- Location: Cultural Center of the Philippines Complex, Pasay, Philippines
- Coordinates: 14.556°N 120.9859°E
- Status: Operating
- Opened: February 23, 1991; 35 years ago
- Owner: Star Parks Corporation
- Operating season: Year-round
- Attendance: 1.5 million

Attractions
- Total: 25 (2022)
- Website: starcity.com.ph

Star City is a 35,000 m^{2} (380,000 sq ft) amusement park in Pasay, Philippines. It is located in the reclaimed area of the Cultural Center of the Philippines Complex, part of Bay City. The facility is owned by Star Parks Corporation, a subsidiary of Elizalde Holdings Corporation (the holding company of the FJE Group of Companies).

Star City was hit by a fire on October 2, 2019, causing major damage to the main building and forcing its closure. Before the fire, Star City had an annual attendance of about 1.5 million people. Star City had more than 30 rides and attractions at the time of the fire, many of which were indoors. The park reopened on February 24, 2022, after delays caused by the COVID-19 pandemic.

== History ==
The park was established on February 23, 1991, as an offshoot of the annual Toys and Gift Fair, a Christmas trade exhibition by the Philippine Center for International Trade and Exhibit (PhilCite), first organized in 1976. In the 1990s, under Fred Elizalde, the fair evolved into an amusement park later named Star City. The former PhilCite building upon which the park was based was pulled down in the late 1990s to make way for the park's indoor rides.

=== 2019 fire ===
Star City was hit by a major fire on October 2, 2019, which destroyed about 80 per cent of the main Star City building, which housed over 30 rides and attractions. At least 25 of those were damaged in the fire, including Gabi ng Lagim, Dungeon of Terror, Bump Car Smash, and Snow World. The outdoor area, including the Star Flyer and Star Frisbee, was mostly spared by the fire. Initial damage estimates ranged from 15 million to 1 billion Philippine pesos.

=== 2022 reopening ===
In December 2021, Star City's social media accounts posted a teaser suggesting that the amusement park would be reopened. The reopening was planned for January 14, 2022, but was postponed due to an increase of COVID-19 cases in Metro Manila brought by the Omicron variant amidst a pandemic of the disease which reached the metropolis in early 2020. After some delays, the park finally reopened on February 24, 2022.

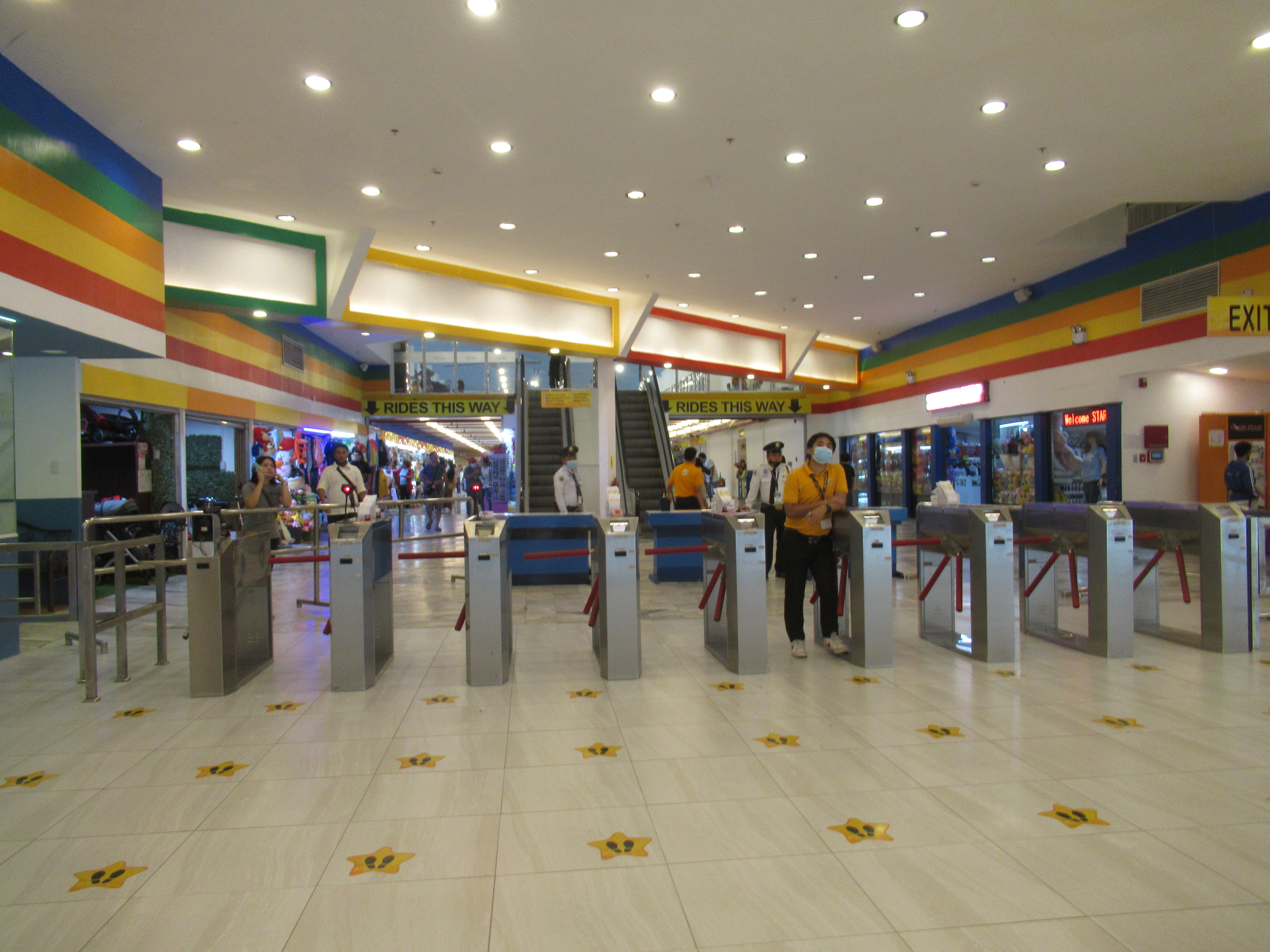
Entrances in February 2023

== Attractions ==
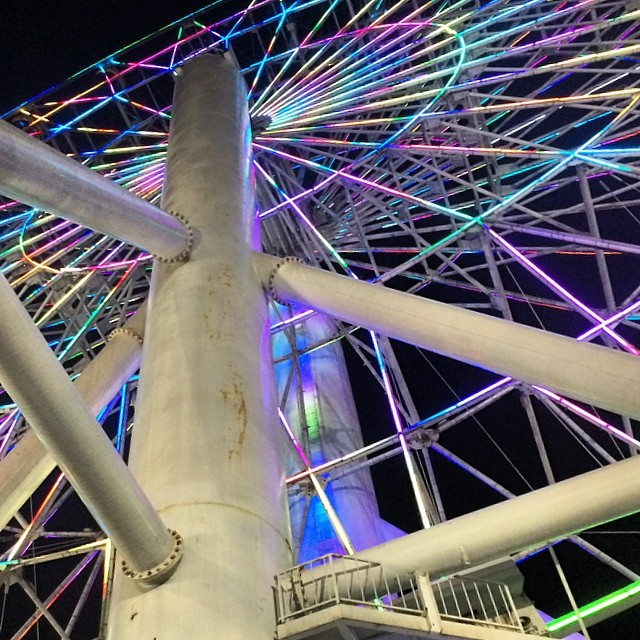
The Giant Star Wheel in 2014

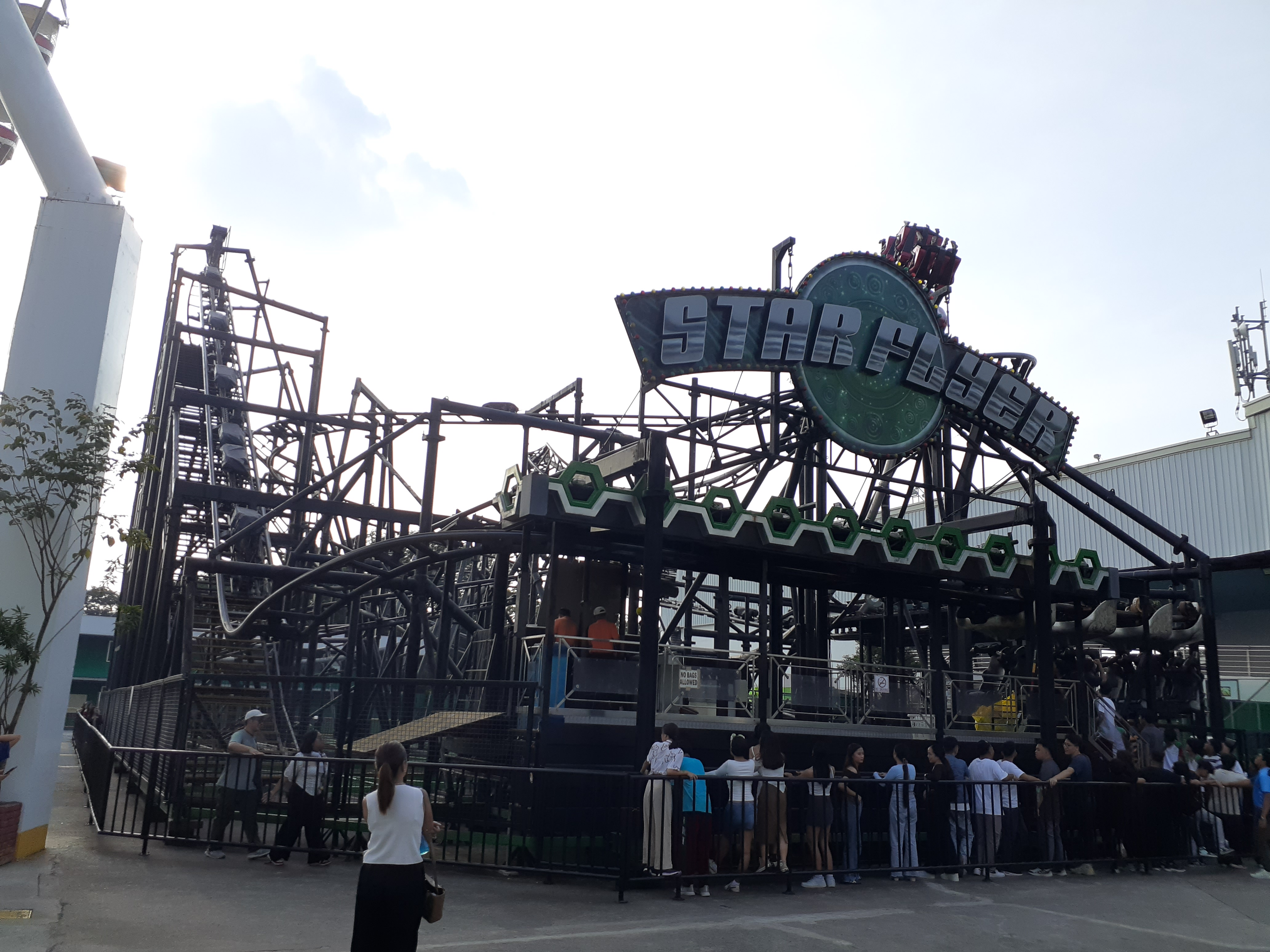
Star Flyer in 2024

Before the 2019 fire, 70 per cent of the facilities of Star City were covered and air-conditioned. The amusement park introduced various types of rides and attractions in the Philippines. It hosted the double-deck carousel, 360-degree-loop roller coaster (the Zyklon Loop), and water log ride (the Jungle Splash) in the country. It hosted Snow World, the largest permanent ice entertainment area in the country, which featured ice carvings, a snow play area and the country's longest ice slide. Another attraction in the amusement park was the inverted roller coaster Star Flyer, which opened in 2007 and was marketed as the first inverted coaster in the Philippines.

Star City hosts the Giant Star Wheel Ferris wheel. It has 32 air-conditioned gondolas, each seating up to six persons. In 2012, it was said to be the tallest Ferris wheel in the Philippines. Conflicting reports credit it with a height of 60 m (197 ft) and 62.5 m (205 ft) tall.

The Aliw and Star Theaters, with a combined seating capacity of 2,125, are located within the amusement park complex, which also houses the headquarters of Manila Broadcasting Company (later MBC Media Group).

The amusement park has 25 operating rides and six attractions.

== Future ==
The Elizalde family's lease on the property where Star City is located is due to expire in 2026. The Philippine government has indicated that it would sell the property as part of efforts by the administration of President Bongbong Marcos to raise revenue by disposing of state assets. The Department of Finance estimates that proceeds from the property's sale could amount to P15 billion.

== Incidents ==
- September 9, 2006: A 13-year-old patron died due to falling off the Wild River (now Jungle Splash) ride. On September 19, four days after its quiet "grand opening," the Pasay City engineering office ordered the suspension of operations of the amusement park, coinciding with the same day that the management reached a settlement with the family of the deceased patron and another but non-fatal incident at the amusement park's bump car ride.
- February 6, 2009: The Star Flyer temporarily ceased operations after a man fell 15 meters (49 ft) off from the ride and died.
- February 7, 2018: The Star Flyer attraction suffered an electrical malfunction at 3:20 p.m., affecting about ten riders who came to a stop in the middle of their hanging tracks for about 15 minutes.
- July 8, 2018: A man died after falling from the top of the Giant Star Wheel ride that night.
- October 2, 2019: A huge blaze caused widespread damage to Star City, forcing it to cease all attractions and ride operations, then closing.

== See also ==
- Boom na Boom
