= Cheremosh Ukrainian Dance Company =

Ukrainian dance company in Canada

Ukrainian Cheremosh Society Logo

Cheremosh Ukrainian Dance Company (Ukrainian: Український Танцювалний Ансамбль "Черемош", romanized: Ukrayins'kiy Tantsyuvalniy Ansambl' "Cheremosh") is a Ukrainian dance company based in Edmonton, Alberta and a leader of Ukrainian dance in Canada. It was founded in 1969 by Chester and Luba Kuc and named after the Cheremosh River that separates the parts of the regions of Bukovina and Galicia within Ukraine. Since 1991 Cheremosh has been under the direction of Artistic Director and Ballet Master Mykola Kanevets. Cheremosh has toured throughout Canada, the United States, Scotland, China, and most recently, a 15-day tour across four Australian cities.

== History ==
The Cheremosh Ukrainian Dance Company of Edmonton, Alberta, was founded in 1969 by Chester and Luba Kuc. The group began with just 19 dancers, and since then has grown to include four performing groups, a School of Dance and over 100 dancers at the various levels. Named after the Cheremosh River that separates the parts of the regions of Bukovina and Halychyna within Ukraine, the company easily matches the river's boisterousness and vivacity.

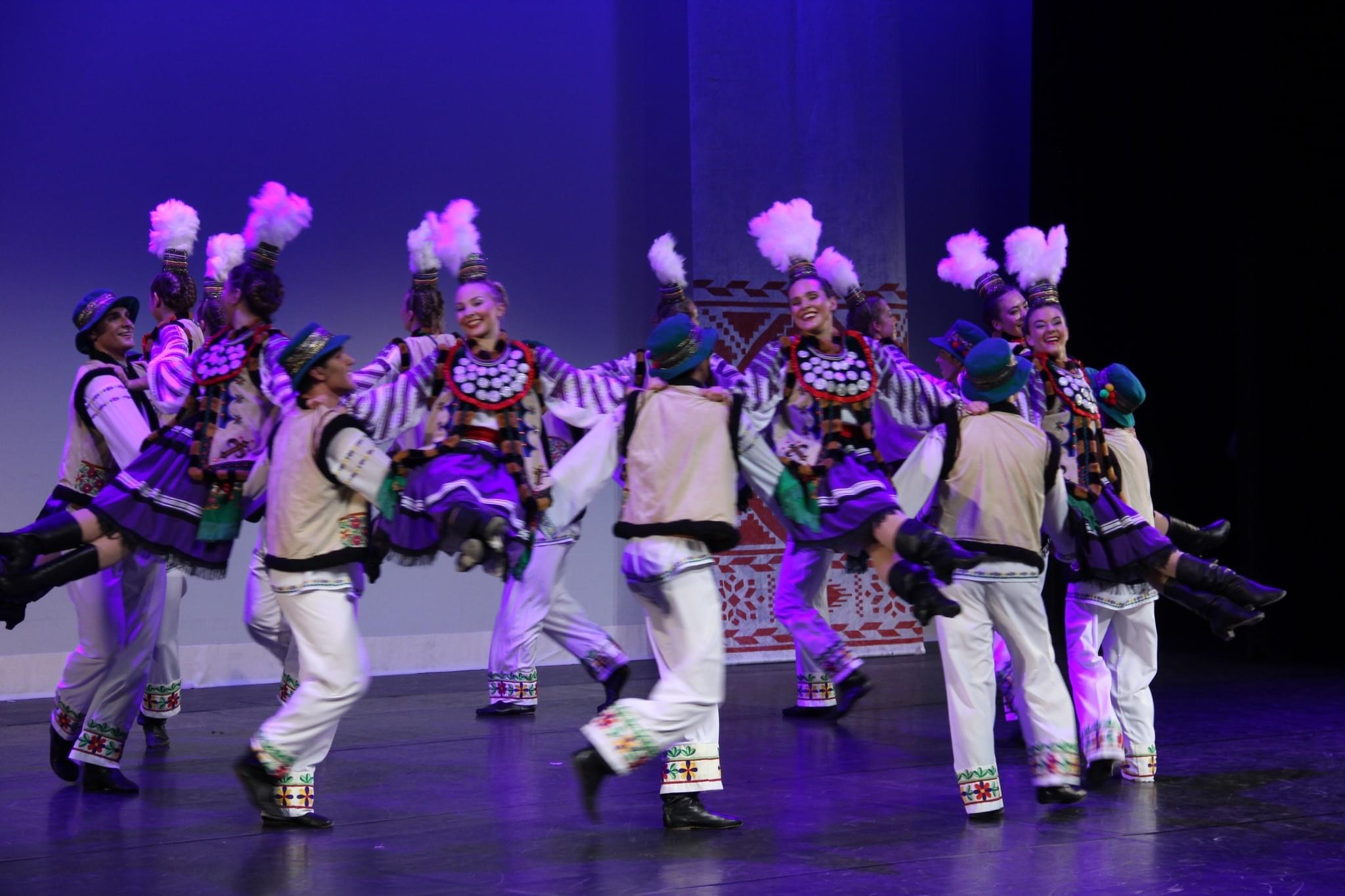

As Cheremosh's first Artistic Director, Chester Kuc's goal was to modernize Ukrainian folk dance by attempting to convey certain truths about the Ukrainian people. Using dance to make these truths dramatic and effective, he brought his dances to the stage in order to entertain audiences and further the growth of the Ukrainian culture in Canada.

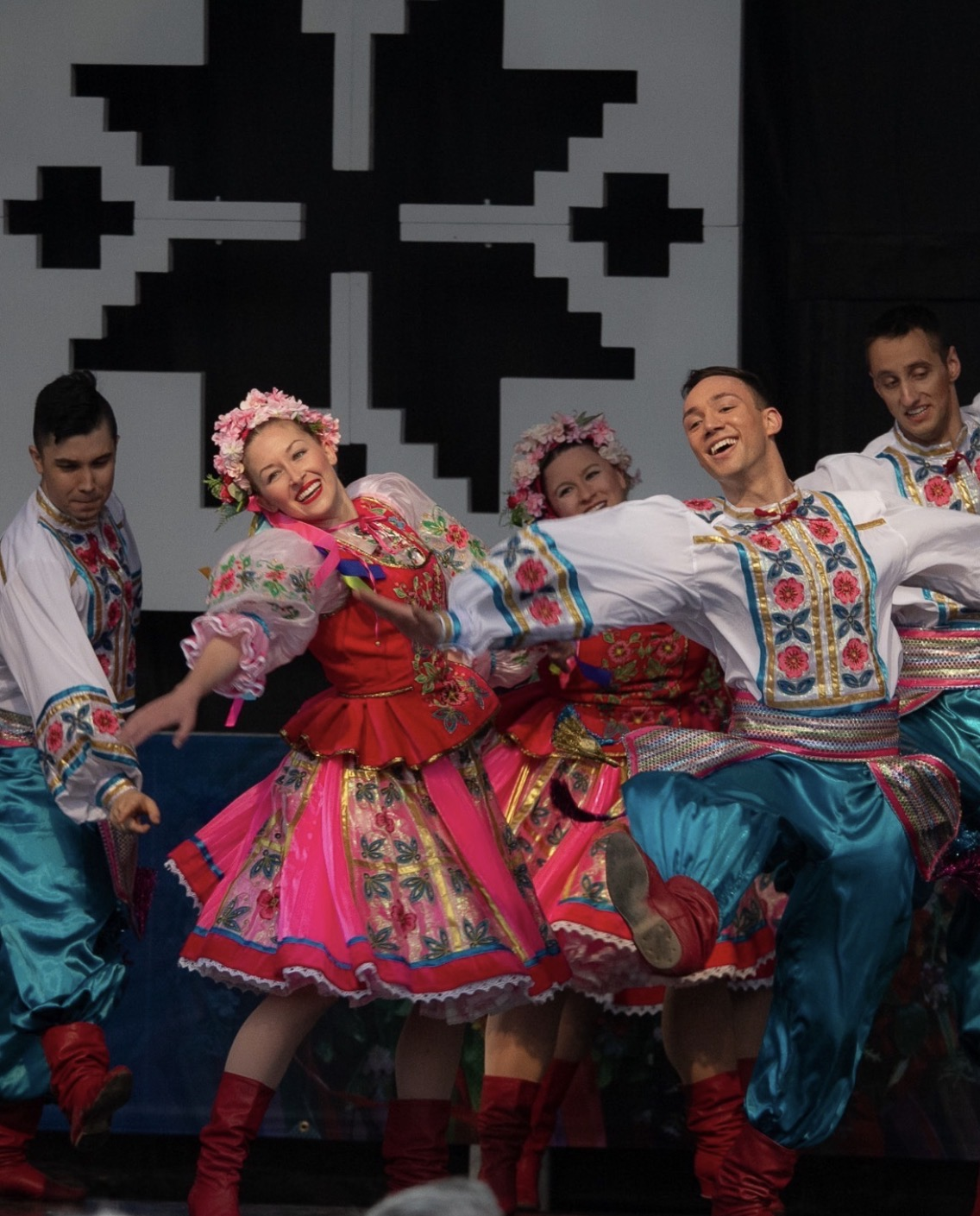
UFest, Edmonton 2019

Since its inception, Cheremosh has had five artistic directors. Following Chester Kuc, Richard Wacko, Ken Kachmar and Greg Bayda, respectively, led Cheremosh between the years of 1982 and 1991.

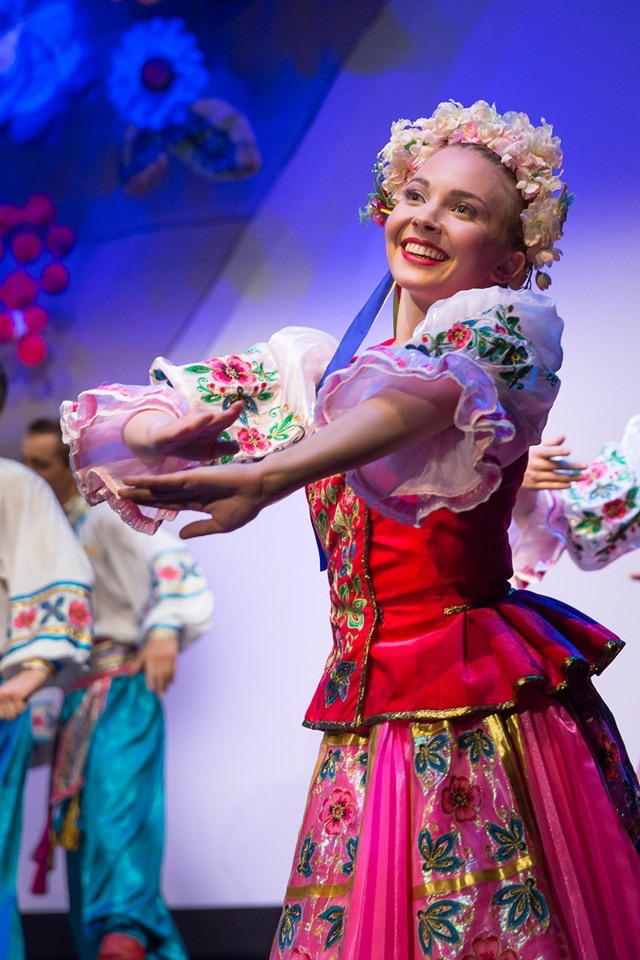
Rhapsodia, Hopak in the style of a Rhapsody Costuming

Currently, all performing groups train under Artistic Director and Ballet Master Mykola Kanevets, whose distinctive choreography and meticulous instruction have helped the Cheremosh Ukrainian Dance Company and its affiliates maintain a strong reputation as a successful and accomplished Ukrainian dance organization.

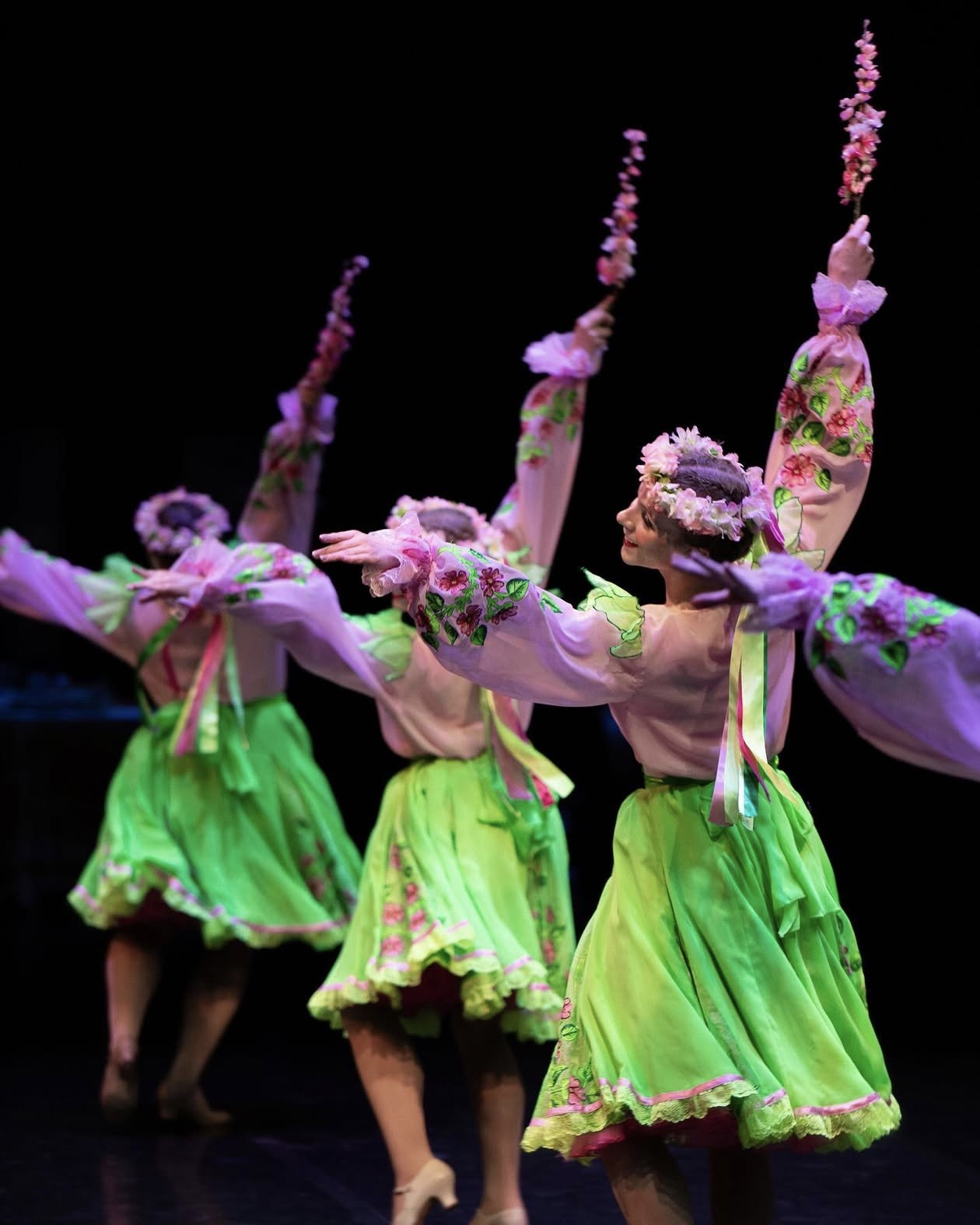
Vesnianochky Panianochly “ Beautiful Women of Spring”

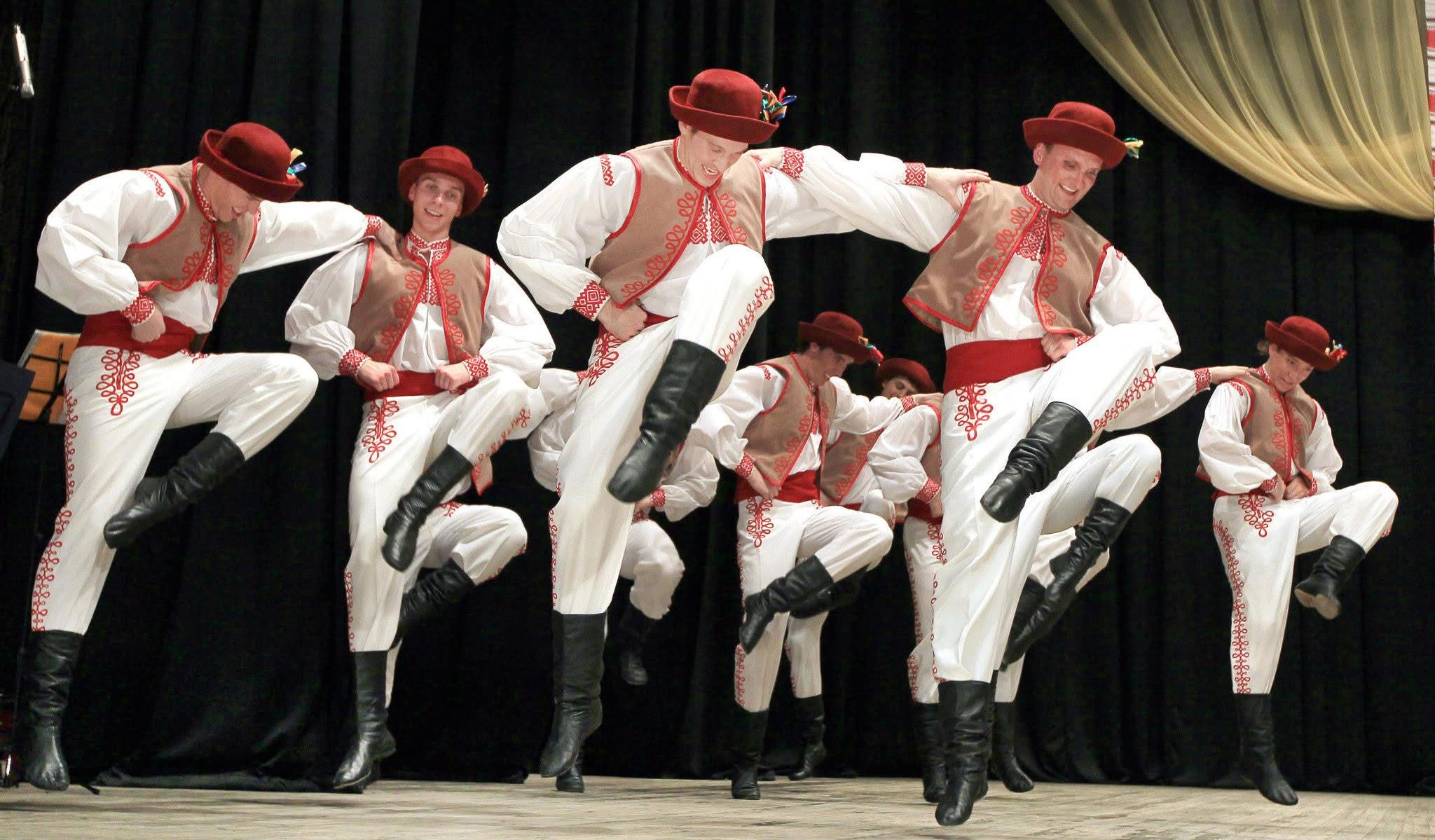
Karichka, Transcarpathian Dance by Cheremosh

== Past tours ==
- 1977 – Sidmouth International Festival (East Devon, south England)
- 1978 –
- 1984 –
- 1988 – Encore Cheremosh
- 1993 – 25th Anniversary Tour
- 1999 – New Beginnings
- 2005 – Revolutions
- 2007 – Journey to the Great Wall (China)
- 2009 – Razom: A Fusion of Ukrainian Dance
- 2010 – Aberdeen, Scotland
- 2011 – Bulgaria
- 2012 – Bud'mo Cheremosh
- 2013 – Tour of Ukraine
- 2015 – "Kaleidoscope" (U.S. tour)
- 2016 – "Kaleidoscope" (Canada tour)
- 2019 – Razom: Two Nations, One Spirit (Australia)

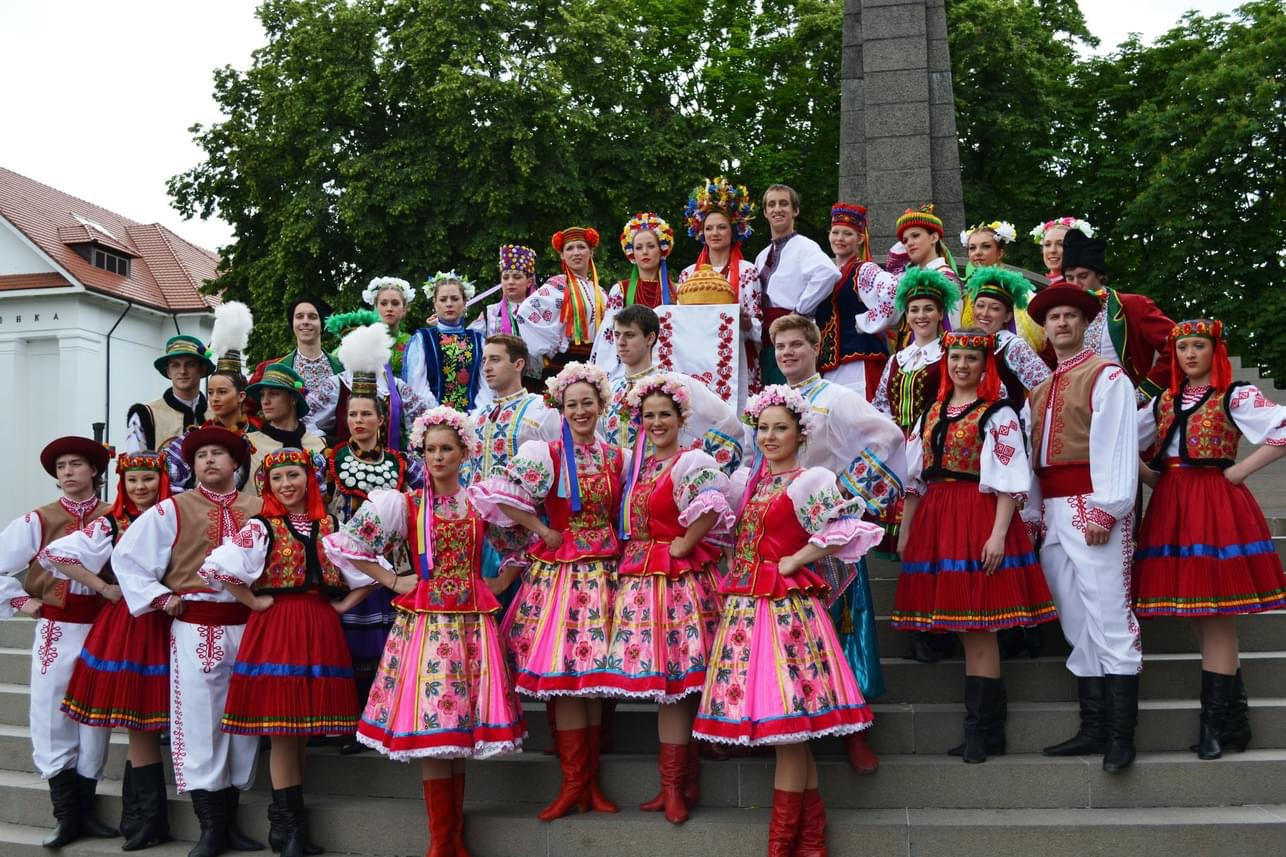
Cheremosh in Ukraine, 2013 Tour

== Other achievements ==
- Have performed for Heads of State, including Queen Elizabeth II and members of the Royal Family; former U.S. President Ronald Reagan, members of Congress and the Senate; Prime Minister Brian Mulroney; and Alberta Premiers Don Getty, Ralph Klein and Ed Stelmach.
- Were chosen as Canada's sole representative to the prestigious 1996 Aberdeen International Youth Festival in Aberdeen, Scotland. Performed in Aberdeen again in 2000.
- Recipients of the 1997 City of Edmonton Salute to Excellence Arts Achievement Award and the 1994 Alberta Council for the Ukrainian Arts Excellence in Artistry Award.
- Headliners at numerous festivals including Festival 88, the Vegreville Pysanka Festival, Canada's National Ukrainian Festival, Hopak in the Park, Heritage Days and Klondike Days.
- Invited to dance at Expo '74 in Spokane, Washington, and Expo 86 in Vancouver, British Columbia.
- Produced the first Ukrainian music compact disc in the world in 1988.
- Performed at the opening ceremonies of the 2005 World Masters Games in Edmonton.

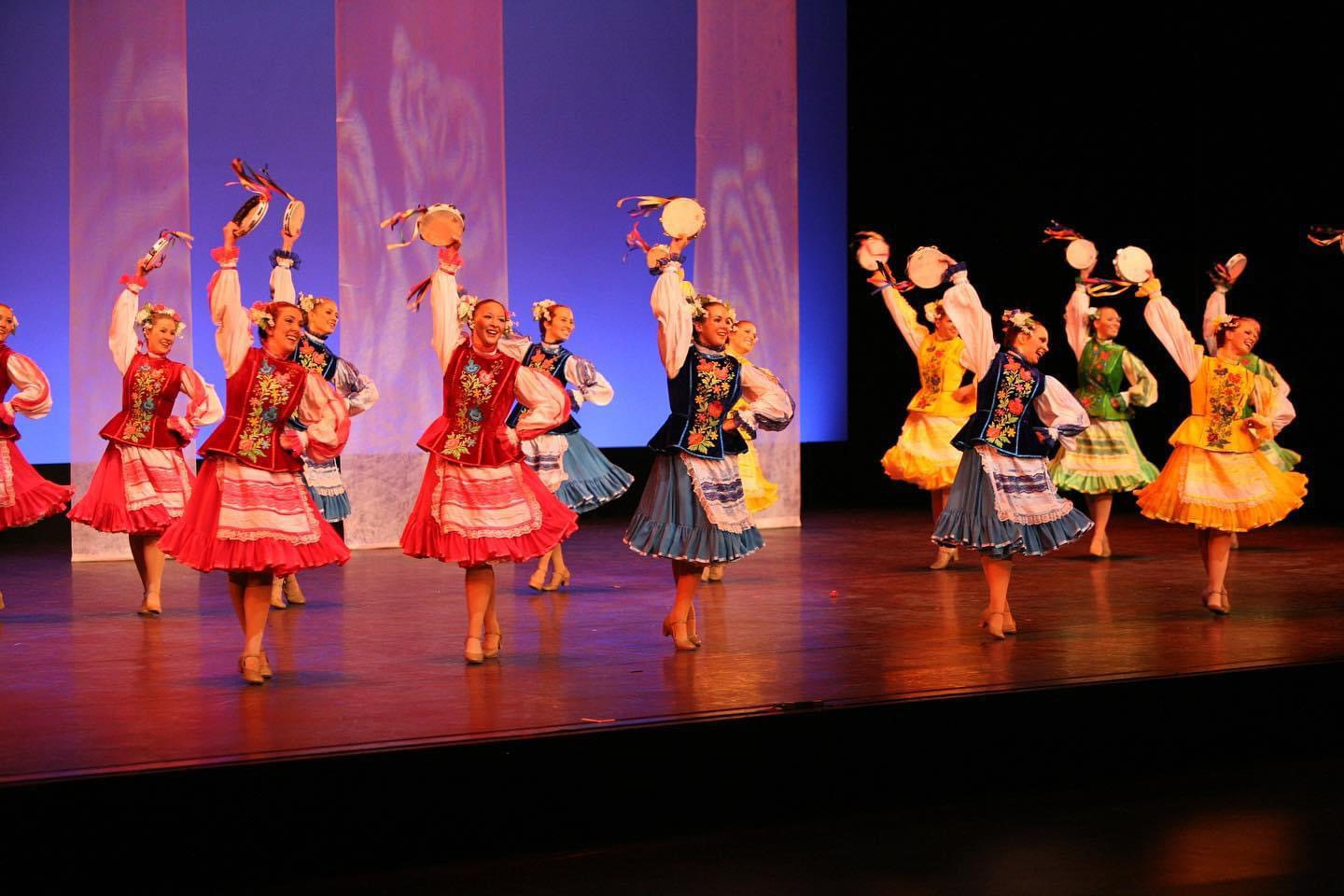
Woman’s Tambourine Dance, Cheremosh Ukrainian Dance Company

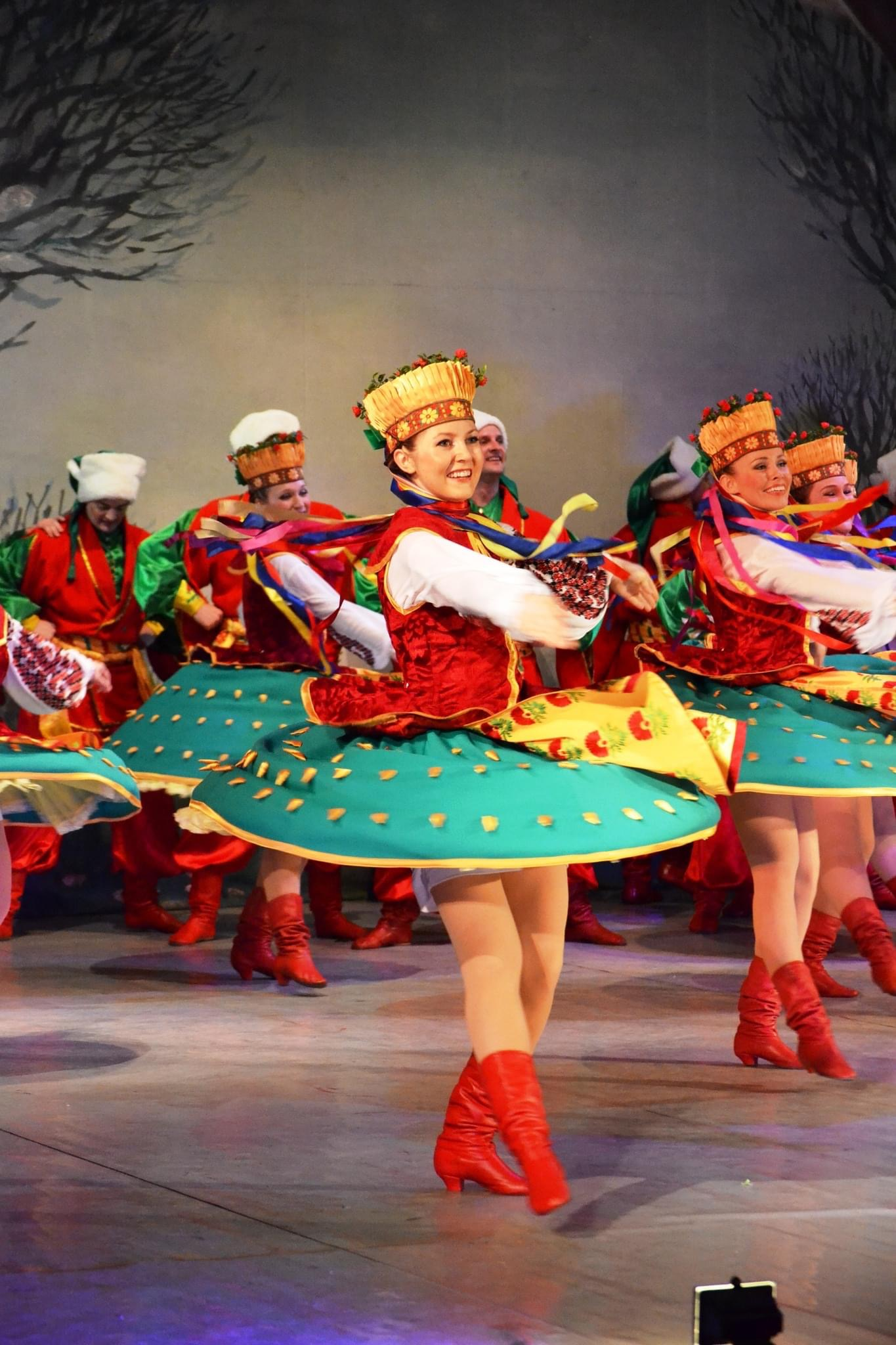
Costuming for Edmonton Hopak
