= Boom na Boom =

Amusement park in Pasay, Philippines

- Interactive map of Boom na Boom
- Location: Pasay, Metro Manila, Philippines
- Coordinates: 14°33′12.2″N 120°59′14.5″E
- Status: Defunct
- Opened: 1989
- Closed: 2000s
- Operated by: Philippine Exhibits and Themeparks Corp.
- Operating season: November–January (Christmas season)

Boom na Boom was a seasonal amusement park in the Pasay, Metro Manila, Philippines. Established in 1989, the attraction has opened every Christmas season until sometime around the 2000s.

== History ==
Philippine Exhibits and Themeparks Corp. (Petco) first opened the Boom na Boom Carnival in 1989. It only operates during the Christmas season opening as early as November and ends in January.

In the 1990s, it faced issues with the Pasay city government regarding taxes.

In 2003, the site was redevelopment as a mixed-used development and rebranded as the Boomland amusement park. The Boom na Boom still had its 2004–05 season. By 2007, Boom na Boom is already defunct as a theme park.

== Rides and attractions ==
The Boom na Boom Carnival has been describe as a perya, a "carnival", and a theme park.

Boom na Boom had various rides during its operation. It had a one-miler roller coaster dubbed as the Ring of Fire; the 360 degree-thriller ride, the Vortex. Other named attractions were the Boomerang, the Mad Mouse and Flying Carpet. It also had horror houses.

Boom na Boom hosted various events such as fireworks display and concerts. The Royal London Circus have performed at Boom na Boom. It also hosted a freak show which persisted until around 2002 as viewership declined. People who were exhibited in the show includes Galema, biled as the "snake queen", the Penguin Boy, Zurika, the woman who eats live chicken.

The Kart Trak, a kart racing course reportedly opened in 2003. The venue was operational until 2015.
