= Philippine Ballet Theatre =

Classical ballet company in the Philippines

The Philippine Ballet Theatre is a classical ballet company in the Philippines. The Philippine Ballet Theatre was founded in 1987 out of an alliance of leading dance groups. It quickly won recognition, as a resident ballet company of the Cultural Center of the Philippines.

The Philippine Ballet Theatre pursues the goal of bringing the art of dance to the general appreciation of Filipino audiences. With its concurrent preservation of the classical story ballets, such as Swan Lake, Giselle, The Nutcracker, and Raymonda, the theatre also launches contemporary ballets like Carmina Burana by David Campos. The company has travelled in national and international tours presenting its Filipino and Western repertoire.
