= Aliw Theater =

Events venue in Pasay, Philippines

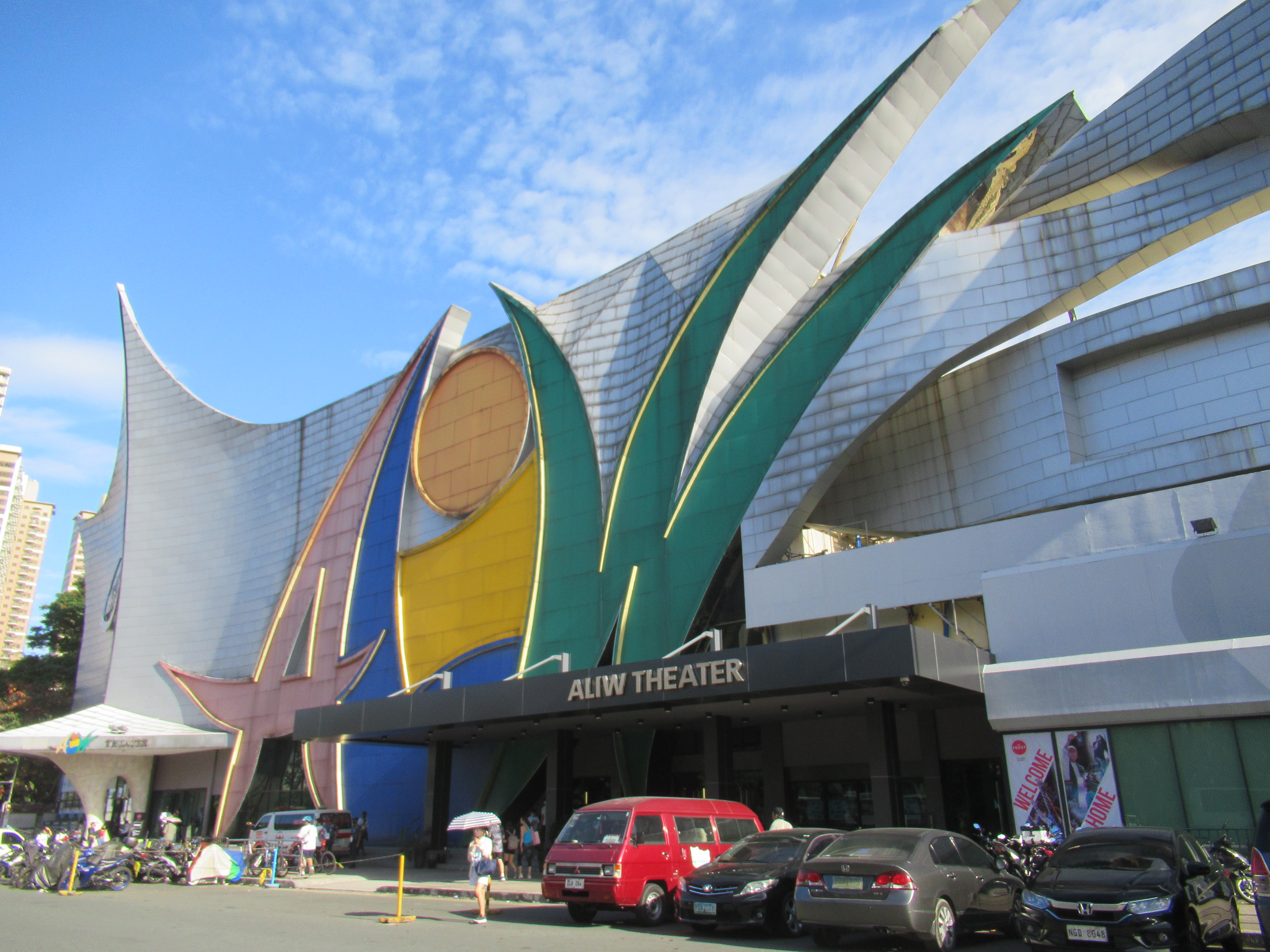

- Location within Metro Manila Location within Luzon Location within Philippines
- Address: CCP Complex, Pasay, Philippines
- Coordinates: 14°33′25″N 120°59′09″E
- Owner: Star Parks Corporation
- Capacity: 2,358 (2002–2019); 1,275 (2022–present)

Construction
- Opened: 2002
- Reopened: August 10, 2022

Website
- aliwtheater.com.ph

The Aliw Theater (Tagalog: [aˈlɪʊ]) is an events venue in Pasay, Metro Manila, Philippines. It is located in the Cultural Center of the Philippines Complex, adjacent to the Star City amusement park and the MBC Media Group building.

== History ==
The Aliw Theater was built in 2002 as a gift of businessman Fred J. Elizalde to his ballerina wife, Lisa Macuja-Elizalde. The theater was personally designed by Fred Elizalde and is owned by Star Parks Corporation, which is also the owner and developer of the adjacent Star City amusement park.

The theater's seating and stage survived a major fire on October 2, 2019, which affected the Star City amusement park compound.

On August 10, 2022, Aliw Theater reopened with newly refurbished seats and stage design, followed by the accompanied performances by Ballet Manila. From December 2022 to December 2023, The Feast Bay Area, a weekly gathering of the Light of Jesus Family founded by Bro. Bo Sanchez, held its sessions at the theater once again.

== Features ==
The Aliw Theater is situated in an area spanning 3,614 square meters (38,900 sq ft). The theater originally had a seating capacity of 2,358 people, with the seating area covering an area of 2,150 square meters (23,100 sq ft). The performing area of Aliw Theater has a width of 27 meters (89 ft) and a height of 1.32 meters (4.3 ft). Other event facilities hosted within the theater building are the 300-square-meter (3,200 sq ft) Aliw Theater Lounge and the 765-square-meter (8,230 sq ft) Elizalde Hall (Aliw Theater Hall). After renovations, the seating capacity of the theater was reduced to 1,275. For orchestral events, 200 seats are reduced to accommodate the band.

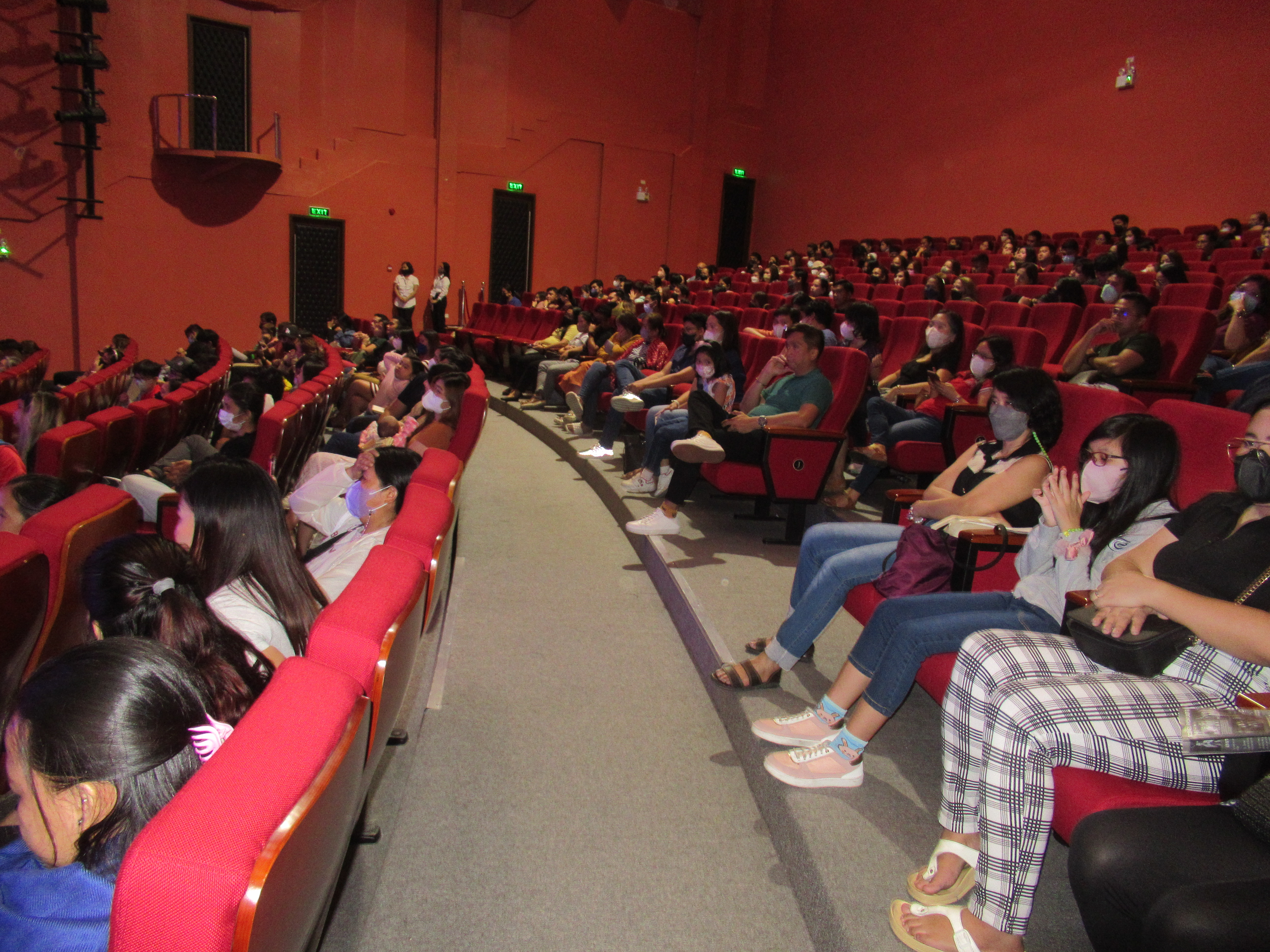
Interior in February 2023

A 100-capacity orchestra pit is also present within the theater, which is the largest in the Philippines. The feature was unveiled in October 2012 as a present to Lisa Macuja-Elizalde on her 48th birthday.

Radio stations owned by the MBC Media Group, namely DZRH, DZMB (Love Radio), DWRK (Easy Rock), DWYS (Yes FM) and Radyo Natin, are also hosted on the theater's first floor, where the entrance is also situated.
