= Aberdeen International Youth Festival =

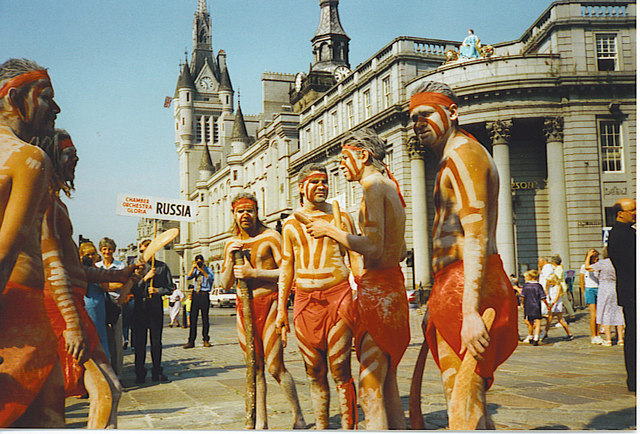
Native Australian performers at the festival

Aberdeen International Youth Festival was a festival of performing arts and one of Scotland's major international cultural events, which ran from 1981 to 2017.

Each year the festival brought over 1000 young people in performing arts companies and music groups from across the globe. It provided a showcase for their talents, bringing them together with professionals and artists.

As well as the ticketed events the Festival staged a parade, open-air performances and a fringe programme in community venues.

A programme attracted over 30,000 people to more than seventy events throughout north east Scotland each year. Concerts, dance shows and galas in Aberdeen were held in venues such as His Majesty's Theatre, the Music Hall and The Lemon Tree as well as smaller venues such as churches (such as Queen's Cross Church, Aberdeen) and also featured a touring programme taking events to rural venues.

The AIYF programme included symphony orchestras and steel bands, song recitals and jazz, traditional music, world music, ballet, contemporary and traditional dance. The festival also produced an opera, (Opera Garden) as well as performances developed by the participating companies working together over the course of the Festival.

In November 2017 it was announced that Aberdeen City Council was to cease funding the event. In March 2018, it was announced that the festival trust was to be wound up.

== History ==
Aberdeen had hosted the International Festival of Youth Orchestras from 1973 to 1980. A dispute between the managers and the local organising committee regarding the participation of South African performers resulted in the event moving to Exeter.

At the same time, the local organising committee in Aberdeen began a new incarnation of the event, the Aberdeen International Festival of Music and the Performing Arts. In 1983 the name was changed to Aberdeen International Youth Festival.

In 2003 the Festival established a full-time office base in Aberdeen and a new Chief Executive, Stephen Stenning was appointed. Developments during this time include the creation of Grampian Youth Orchestra. In 2007 Stewart Aitken, formerly Artistic Director of Wigan Pier Theatre Company became the Chief Executive.

== Opera Garden ==
Opera Garden was the Aberdeen International Youth Festival's Opera Project. Named after the Aberdonian opera singer, Mary Garden, the project aspired to continue her work, providing new challenges and performances for young singers.

Conceived by Artistic Director Gidon Saks, the project brought together young singers from across the world and in three weeks produced a full-scale opera production. Opera Garden staged Così fan tutte, Eugene Onegin, Don Giovanni, Carmen, The Magic Flute, Falstaff, The Turn of the Screw and Hansel and Gretel.

== AIYF Dance School ==
The Festival's Dance Summer School ran for 25 years and welcomed teachers from major schools and companies worldwide including the Paris Opera Ballet School and the Kirov and Bolshoi companies.

A Dance Summer School was held annually as part of the Aberdeen International Youth Festival. The school offered an intensive course in dance for students aged 12–16, a performance course for advanced level students in full-time training for a career in dance, a music theatre course and a 'taster day' for younger dance students.

== Some notable people that have appeared at the festival ==
- Claudio Abbado
- Cheremosh Ukrainian Dance Company
- Kyung-wha Chung
- Aaron Copland
- Zaira Cosico
- Noel Edmonds
- Evelyn Glennie
- Rolf Harris
- Nigel Kennedy
- Julian Lloyd Webber
- Magnus Magnusson
- Simon Rattle
- José Serebrier
- Leopold Stokowski
- The University of the Philippines Concert Chorus
- The Philippine Baranggay Folk Dance Troupe

== Patrons ==
Patrons of the festival included -

- The Lord Provost of the City of Aberdeen
- The Honourable The Marchioness of Aberdeen and Temair
- Dame Evelyn Glennie
- Lisa Milne CBE
