= Lisa Macuja-Elizalde =

Filipino prima ballerina (born 1964)

- Born: Lisa Teresita Pacheco Macuja; October 3, 1964 (age 61); Manila, Philippines
- Education: Russian Vaganova technique
- Known for: Ballet
- Movement: Classical, Modern

Lisa Teresita Macuja Elizalde (born October 3, 1964) is a Filipino prima ballerina. In 1984, she became the first foreign soloist to ever join the Kirov Ballet. In the Philippines, she is the Artistic Director and CEO of Ballet Manila and was the Vice-Chairman of the Philippine UNESCO National Commission. She was also the Commissioner of the National Commission on the Role of Filipino Women. Macuja-Elizalde is also Directress and faculty member of the Lisa Macuja School of Ballet – a training center for ballet professionals who are steeped in the Russian Vaganova method. She is also the founder of Project Ballet Futures (PBF) - an internationally recognized community scholarship program that provides training and performance opportunities for deserving public school students.

== Biography ==
=== Early years ===
Macuja was born at Lourdes Hospital in the City of Manila, Philippines. She is the daughter of Cesar Macuja and Susan Pacheco. She is the second among four siblings. Her elder brother, Julio II (Joly), was born in 1963. She had a younger brother who was a teenage actor and musical artist named Jerome, who was born in 1967 but died in a car accident on September 30, 1984, just three days before her 20th birthday, during her first season at the Kirov Ballet. She is the sister of Gia Macuja, an actress and musical artist who was born in 1971. As a Roman Catholic, she attended St. Theresa's College in Quezon City, Philippines, where she was a consistent honour student in grade school until she graduated salutatorian in her high school class. At age 8, she started her first ballet class with Felicitas Layag-Radaic as her mentor, who kept a vigilant eye on her early years as a ballerina and saw her through five Royal Academy of Dancing (RAD) syllabus examinations in the ten years while she was under her school. At age 11, she danced onstage for the first time in a ballet recital called Twinkle Toes in Tinsel Land that was shown on February 29, 1976, at the Meralco Theater, Pasig City, Philippines. She was an apprentice and young soloist of Dance Theater Philippines (DTP). She received her advanced certificate from the Royal Academy of Dancing and earned a scholarship to the Vaganova Choreographic Institute in Leningrad. She danced with the renowned Kirov Ballet between 1984 and 1986. She returned to Manila in 1986 and became the first artist-in-residence of the Cultural Center of the Philippines (CCP) while dancing with Ballet Philippines. In 1988, she became a ballerina of the Philippine Ballet Theater (PBT) and has since remained Philippine-based, performing as the principal ballerina in major local productions and as an international guest artist in Russia, Lithuania, Latvia, Ukraine, Georgia, Armenia, the United States, Cuba, Mexico, Japan, South Korea, Malaysia, Singapore, and New Zealand. In 1995, she established her very own ballet company, Ballet Manila, envisioned as a ballet company by the dancers, of the dancers and for the dancers, dance training and education rank among the foremost priorities of the group under the watchful eyes of Macuja-Elizalde and ballet master Osias Barroso, who have drilled the company in the highly-rigorous Russian (Vaganova) method of classical ballet. During the first 10 years of Ballet Manila's touring, Lisa Macuja-Elizalde has led the company on four performance tours of 16 cities in Russia, four performance tours of 15 cities in the United States, and arts festivals such as the Aberdeen Youth Festival in Scotland, and the Folk Arts Festival in South Korea, the Asia Arts Festival in Beijing, China, the Angkor-Gyeongju World Culture Expo in Angkor-Wat, Cambodia and the Philippine Fiesta in Japan. She also led her company in outreach performance tours of more than 45 cities and towns throughout the Philippines.

=== Career and education ===
In 1982, Macuja was a scholar of the USSR Ministry of Culture when she entered the Vaganova Choreographic Institute, currently known as the Academy of Russian Ballet at Saint Petersburg, Russia. Lisa trained under former Kirov ballerina Tatiana Alexandrovna Udalenkova, who taught her the Russian Vaganova technique. At the Leningrad Choreographic School, Macuja was coached by Natalia M. Dudinskaya, then under the artistic director Konstantin Sergeyev. She graduated at the top of her class in 1984, as she became the first foreign soloist to be invited to join the Kirov ballet. At the Kirov, Lisa was taught by Galina P. Kekisheva under artistic director Oleg Vinogradov. It was at the historical Maryinsky Theater that Lisa first premiered as the principal ballerina in The Nutcracker, Don Quixote, and Giselle.

In 1984, on a television interview during the 245th graduation program of the Leningrad Choreographic School at St. Petersburg, Russia, Konstantin Sergeyev spoke these words in Russian language (translated to English) about Lisa Macuja: "Especially remarkable is Lisa Macuja, who is exceptionally gifted. She is striking. She is like a spark, a spark full of life. She is graceful and virtuosic in her technique. She excites the audience. This is a great art, and it is her art and her natural talent."

She received an Associate of Arts degree in General Studies in 2004 and her Bachelor of Science degree in Business Management (with honours) in 2007 from the University of Phoenix, U.S., which is an online correspondence school.

=== Media personality ===
It was on March 11, 2007, when Lisa Macuja-Elizalde launched her radio show billed as 'Art 2 Art', with the hope to nurture a relationship between the Filipino audience and the artists, thereby further promoting art consciousness to the public with a lively exchange of ideas and experiences by guest artists on the radio. Macuja-Elizalde's 'Art 2 Art' is produced by the Manila Broadcasting Company, the largest radio network in the Philippines and in Asia with over 500 radio stations all over, with its flagship station DZRH, the oldest radio station in the Philippines covering 97% of the archipelago.

In July 2012, Senator Miriam Defensor-Santiago filed Senate Resolution 808, urging then-President of the Philippines Benigno Aquino III to confer on prima ballerina Lisa Macuja-Elizalde the title of National Artist for Dance. Santiago said she filed the resolution after watching "World Stars of Ballet," which starred Macuja-Elizalde.

Macuja was the first foreign soloist in the prestigious Kirov Ballet, also known as the Imperial Russian Ballet.

"Lisa is hailed as the 'ballerina of the people.' No Filipina ballerina has yet surpassed the recognition and pride Lisa Macuja-Elizalde has brought to the Philippines. She is the embodiment of talent, creativity, imagination, technical proficiency of the highest order, grace, and humanity, which makes her worthy of the title of National Artist," Santiago said.

== Awards and recognitions ==
=== Awards ===
- Special Prize for Artistry by the House of Diaghilev in Moscow (1992)
- International Diaghilev Ballet Competition in Moscow, Russia, 5th Place (1992)
- USA International Ballet Competition in Jackson, Mississippi, Semi-Finalist (Senior Division) (1990)
- Quezon City's Outstanding Citizen Award (1989)
- Asia-Pacific Ballet Competition in Tokyo, Silver Medal (1987)
- Patnubay ng Kalinangan at Sining Award (Outstanding Achievement in the Arts) given by the City Government of Manila (1988)
- Most Outstanding Citizen Award given by the Quezon City Government (1989)
- Best Radio Host - Arts and Culture Program (Gawad Tanglaw Awards) 2011,
- Hildegarde Award for Women in Media given by St. Scholastica's College, Manila (2013)

=== Recognitions ===
- Ten Outstanding Young Persons of the World (TOYP U.S.A, 1997)
- Ten Outstanding Young Filipinos (TOYF, 1995)
- The Outstanding Women in Nation's Service (TOWNS, 1989)
- The Order of International Friendship awarded by Russian President Vladimir Putin (2001)
- Pearl of the Orient Award given by the Rotary Club of the Philippines (2008)
- Outstanding Female Lead Performance in a Dance Production (Gawad Buhay Awards for the Performing Arts, 2008)
- Outstanding Female Lead Performance in a Dance Production (Gawad Buhay Awards for the Performing Arts, 2010)
- Natatanging Gawad Buhay (Lifetime Achievement Award) 2010
- Outstanding Female Lead Performance in a Classical Dance Production (Gawad Buhay Awards for the Performing Arts, 2011)
- Outstanding Female Lead Performance in a Classical Dance Production (Gawad Buhay Awards for the Performing Arts, 2012)
- Entertainer of the Year (Aliw Awards Foundation, 2012)
- Outstanding Female Lead Performance in a Classical Dance Production (Gawad Buhay Awards for the Performing Arts, 2012)

== Personal life ==
Macuja married Fred J. Elizalde on June 7, 1997. The couple have two children, Michelle Elizabeth "Missy" M. Elizalde, born July 28, 1998, and Manuel Cesar "Mac" M. Elizalde, born August 27, 2000.

== Sources ==
- Ballerina of the People. Lisa Macuja-Elizalde, Angela Blardony Ureta, Susan A. De Guzman. 2006. ISBN 978-971-93615-0-3
- Treading Through: 45 Years of Philippine Dance. Basilio Esteban S. Villaruz. 2006. ISBN 978-971-542-509-4
- Villaruz, B.E.S. "Altar". In CCP Encyclopedia of Philippine Art, 1st ed., Vol. 5, 219. Philippines: CCP Publications Office, 1994.
