= 34th PMPC Star Awards for Television =

Philippine television awards

- Date: October 17, 2021
- Location: MOWELFUND Studio
- Presented by: Philippine Movie Press Club
- Hosted by: Sanya Lopez; Alfred Vargas

Television/radio coverage
- Network: STV
- Produced by: Film Development Council of the Philippines
- Directed by: Peter Allan Mariano

The 34th PMPC Star Awards for Television honored the best in Philippine television programming from 2019 until 2020, as chosen by the Philippine Movie Press Club. The ceremony was held virtually on October 17, 2021, and broadcast on STV at 6:00 pm. The ceremony was hosted by Sanya Lopez and Alfred Vargas.

The nominations were announced by the Press on July 19, 2021.

== Winners and Nominees ==
Winners are listed first and highlighted in bold:

=== Networks ===
Best TV Station
- **ABS-CBN 2**
  - PTV 4
  - TV5
  - GMA 7
  - CNN Philippines 9
  - IBC 13
  - GMA News TV 27
  - Net 25
  - UNTV 37

=== Programs ===
Best Primetime Drama Series	Best Daytime Drama Series
**Pamilya Ko (ABS-CBN 2)**; FPJ's Ang Probinsyano (ABS-CBN 2); The Gift (GMA 7); The Killer Bride (ABS-CBN 2); Love of My Life (GMA 7); One of the Baes (GMA 7); Starla (ABS-CBN 2)	**Magkaagaw (GMA 7)**; Bilangin ang Bituin sa Langit (GMA 7); Dahil Sa Pag-ibig (GMA 7); Hanggang sa Dulo ng Buhay Ko (GMA 7); Madrasta (GMA 7); Prima Donnas (GMA 7); Sandugo (ABS-CBN 2)
Best Drama Anthology	Best Horror/Fantasy Program
**Ipaglaban Mo (ABS-CBN 2)**; Dear Uge (GMA 7); Karelasyon (GMA 7); Magpakailanman (GMA 7); Maynila (GMA 7); Tadhana (GMA 7); Wagas (GMA News TV 27)	**Daig Kayo Ng Lola Ko (GMA 7)**; Parasite Island (ABS-CBN 2); The Haunted (ABS-CBN 2)
Best Comedy Show	Best Variety Show
**Pepito Manaloto (GMA 7)**; Banana Sundae (ABS-CBN 2); Daddy's Gurl (GMA 7); Home Sweetie Home: Extra Sweet (ABS-CBN 2)	**It's Showtime (ABS-CBN 2)**; All-Out Sundays (GMA 7); ASK TV: Artihan, Sayawan at Kantahan (IBC 13); The Boobay and Tekla Show (GMA 7); Sunday PinaSaya (GMA 7); Wowowin (GMA 7)
Best Musical Variety Show	Best Talent Search Program
**Young Once Upon A Time (Net 25)**; Letters and Music (Net 25); SMAC Pinoy Ito (IBC 13)	**The Clash (GMA 7)**; ASOP Music Festival (UNTV 37)
Best Celebrity Talk Show	Best News Program
**Tonight with Boy Abunda (ABS-CBN 2)**; Gandang Gabi Vice (ABS-CBN 2); Magandang Buhay (ABS-CBN 2); Mars Pa More (GMA 7); Moments (Net 25); Profiles (CNN Philippines); Sarap, 'Di Ba? (GMA 7)	**TV Patrol (ABS-CBN 2)**; 24 Oras (GMA 7); Aksyon (TV5); Bandila (ABS-CBN 2); Balitaan (CNN Philippines); Balitanghali (GMA News TV); Saksi (GMA 7); State of the Nation (GMA News TV 27)
Best Public Affairs Program	Best Morning Show
**The Bottomline with Boy Abunda (ABS-CBN 2)**; Bawal ang Pasaway kay Mareng Winnie (GMA News TV 27); Get It Straight with Daniel Razon (UNTV 37); On the Record (CNN Philippines 9); Sa Ganang Mamamayan (Net 25); Sports Desk (CNN Philippines 9); The Source (CNN Philippines)	**Umagang Kay Ganda (ABS-CBN 2)**; Bagong Pilipinas (PTV 4); Good Morning Kuya (UNTV 37); Pambansang Almusal (Net 25); Unang Hirit (GMA 7)
Best Public Service Program	Best Documentary Program
**Healing Galing (TV5)**; Imbestigador (GMA 7); Mission Possible (ABS-CBN 2); My Puhunan (ABS-CBN 2); Salamat Dok (ABS-CBN 2); S.O.C.O.: Scene of the Crime Operatives (ABS-CBN 2); Wish Ko Lang (GMA 7)	**I-Witness (GMA 7)**; The Atom Araullo Specials (GMA 7); Brigada (GMA News TV 27); CNN Philippines Presents (CNN Philippines); Local Legends (ABS-CBN 2); No Filter (ABS-CBN 2); Reporter's Notebook (GMA 7)
Best Magazine Show	Best Travel Show
**Kapuso Mo, Jessica Soho (GMA 7)**; Ang Pinaka (GMA News TV 27); Biyaheng Langit (PTV 4); Good News Kasama si Vicky Morales (GMA News TV 27); IJuander (GMA News TV); Kasangga Mo ang Langit (PTV 4); Rated K (ABS-CBN 2)	**G Diaries (ABS-CBN 2)**; Biyahe ni Drew (GMA News TV 27); Cooltura (IBC 13)
Best Lifestyle Show	Best Educational Program
**Taste Buddies (GMA News TV 27)**; Glow Up (GMA News TV 27); Loving What You Do (GMA News TV 27); Pop Talk (GMA News TV 27)	**Born to Be Wild (GMA 7)**; AHA! (GMA 7); Idol sa Kusina (GMA News TV 27); Matanglawin (ABS-CBN 2); Med Talk (CNN Philippines 9); Pinas Sarap (GMA News TV); Sports U (ABS-CBN 2)
Best Children Show
**Talents Academy (IBC 13)**; Anong Say Nyo? (Net 25); Kid Kwento (Net 25); The KNC Show (UNTV 37)

=== Personalities ===
Best Drama Actor	Best Drama Actress
**JM de Guzman on Pamilya Ko (ABS-CBN 2)**; Dingdong Dantes on Descendants of the Sun (GMA 7); Joshua Garcia on The Killer Bride (ABS-CBN 2); Jeric Gonzales on Magkaagaw (GMA 7); Joey Marquez on Pamilya Ko (ABS-CBN 2); Coco Martin on FPJ's Ang Probinsyano (ABS-CBN 2); Alden Richards on The Gift (GMA 7)	**Sylvia Sanchez on Pamilya Ko (ABS-CBN 2)**; Nora Aunor on Bilangin ang Bituin sa Langit (GMA 7); Sunshine Dizon on Magkaagaw (GMA 7); Jennylyn Mercado on Descendants of the Sun (GMA 7); Coney Reyes on Love of My Life (GMA 7); Maja Salvador on The Killer Bride (ABS-CBN 2); Judy Ann Santos on Starla (ABS-CBN 2)
Best Drama Supporting Actor	Best Drama Supporting Actress
**Roderick Paulate on One of the Baes (GMA 7)**; Michael de Mesa on FPJ's Ang Probinsyano (ABS-CBN 2); Gabby Eigenmann on Bilangin ang Bituin aa Langit (GMA 7); Jaime Fabregas on FPJ's Ang Probinsyano (ABS-CBN 2); Rocco Nacino on Descendants of the Sun (GMA 7); Joel Torre on Starla (ABS-CBN 2); Gardo Versoza on Sandugo (ABS-CBN 2)	**Aiko Melendez on Prima Donnas (GMA 7)**; Irma Adlawan on Pamilya Ko (ABS-CBN 2); Angel Aquino on FPJ's Ang Probinsyano (ABS-CBN 2); Vina Morales on Sandugo (ABS-CBN 2); Cherry Pie Picache on Sandugo (ABS-CBN 2); Isabel Rivas on Bilangin ang Bituin aa Langit (GMA 7); Lorna Tolentino on FPJ's Ang Probinsyano (ABS-CBN 2)
Best Single Performance by An Actor	Best Single Performance by An Actress
**Seth Fedelin on Maalaala Mo Kaya: Ilog (ABS-CBN 2)**; Ogie Alcasid on Maalaala Mo Kaya: Flyers (ABS-CBN 2); Joshua Garcia on Maalaala Mo Kaya: Tren (ABS-CBN 2); Sid Lucero on Maalaala Mo Kaya: Mural (ABS-CBN 2); Ruru Madrid on Magpakailanman: Adik Sa'yo (GMA 7); Dennis Trillo on Magpakailanman: OFW Most Wanted (GMA 7); Cris Villanueva on Maalaala Mo Kaya: Ilog (ABS-CBN 2)	**Sunshine Dizon on Tadhana: Magkano Ang Forever (GMA 7)**; Julia Barretto on Maalaala Mo Kaya: Colored Pens (ABS-CBN 2); Jasmine Curtis-Smith on Tadhana: Sex Slave (GMA 7); Janice de Belen on Maalaala Mo Kaya: Mata (ABS-CBN 2); Jane de Leon on Maalaala Mo Kaya: Medal (ABS-CBN 2); Alessandra de Rossi on Tadhana: Sisters at War (GMA 7); Glaiza de Castro on Magpakailanman: Sino Ang Baliw (GMA 7)
Best Child Performer	Best New Male TV Personality
**Enzo Pelojero on Starla (ABS-CBN 2)**; Jana Agoncillo on Starla (ABS-CBN 2); Euwenn Aleta on Hanggang sa Dulo ng Buhay Ko (GMA 7); Charles Jacob Briz on The Gift (GMA 7); Yuan Francisco on The Better Woman (GMA 7); Raikko Mateo on Pamilya Ko (ABS-CBN 2); Kenken Nuyad on Parasite Island (ABS-CBN 2)	**Joaquin Domagoso on All-Out Sundays (GMA 7)**; Allen Ansay on Magpakailanman: Buhay Kapalit ng Alak (GMA 7); Kim de Leon on All-Out Sundays (GMA 7); Dan Delgado on It's Showtime (ABS-CBN 2); Jerick Dolormente on All-Out Sundays (GMA 7); Wize Estabillo on It's Showtime (ABS-CBN 2); Radson Flores on All-Out Sundays (GMA 7); Jin Macapagal on It's Showtime (ABS-CBN 2); Ron Macapagal on It's Showtime (ABS-CBN 2); Abdul Raman on All-Out Sundays (GMA 7)
Best New Female TV Personality	Best Comedy Actor
**Kaori Oinuma on Maalaala Mo Kaya: Mata (ABS-CBN 2)**; Angela Alarcon on Beautiful Justice (GMA 7); Thea Astley on All-Out Sundays (GMA 7); Faye Lorenzo on Bubble Gang (GMA 7); Rere Madrid on Magpakailanman: Tanging Ina Ng Lahat: The Amelia Calma Story (GMA 7); Shayne Sava on All-Out Sundays (GMA 7); Gillian Vicencio on Maalaala Mo Kaya: Colored Pens (ABS-CBN 2); Chantal Videla on Starla (ABS-CBN 2)	**Vic Sotto on Daddy's Gurl (GMA 7)**; Bayani Agbayani on Home Sweetie Home: Extra Sweet (ABS-CBN 2); Jayson Gainza on Banana Sundae (ABS-CBN 2); Luis Manzano on Home Sweetie Home: Extra Sweet (ABS-CBN 2); Vhong Navarro on Home Sweetie Home: Extra Sweet (ABS-CBN 2); Pooh on Banana Sundae (ABS-CBN 2); Michael V. on Pepito Manaloto (GMA 7)
Best Comedy Actress	Best Male TV Host
**Manilyn Reynes on Pepito Manaloto (GMA 7)**; Alex Gonzaga on Home Sweetie Home: Extra Sweet (ABS-CBN 2); Toni Gonzaga on Home Sweetie Home: Extra Sweet (ABS-CBN 2); Maine Mendoza on Daddy's Gurl (GMA 7); Angelica Panganiban on Banana Sundae (ABS-CBN 2); Pokwang on Banana Sundae (ABS-CBN 2); Nova Villa on Pepito Manaloto (GMA 7)	**Vice Ganda on It's Showtime (ABS-CBN 2)**; Ogie Alcasid on ASAP Natin 'To (ABS-CBN 2); Paolo Ballesteros on Eat Bulaga! (GMA 7); Luis Manzano on ASAP Natin 'To (ABS-CBN 2); Martin Nievera on ASAP Natin 'To (ABS-CBN 2); Alden Richards on Eat Bulaga! (GMA 7); Vic Sotto on Eat Bulaga! (GMA 7); Gary Valenciano on ASAP Natin 'To (ABS-CBN 2)
Best Female TV Host	Best Talent Search Program Host
**Amy Perez on It's Showtime (ABS-CBN 2)**; Anne Curtis on It's Showtime (ABS-CBN 2); Sarah Geronimo on ASAP Natin 'To (ABS-CBN 2); Pia Guanio on Eat Bulaga! (GMA 7); Karylle on It's Showtime (ABS-CBN 2); Maine Mendoza on Eat Bulaga! (GMA 7); Regine Velasquez on ASAP Natin 'To (ABS-CBN 2)	**Luis Manzano on I Can See Your Voice (ABS-CBN 2)**; Rayver Cruz and Julie Anne San Jose on The Clash (GMA 7); Toni Rose Gayda and Richard Reynoso on ASOP Music Festival (UNTV 37)
Best Celebrity Talk Show Host	Best Male Newscaster
**Boy Abunda on Tonight with Boy Abunda (ABS-CBN 2)**; Mitzi Borromeo on Profiles (CNN Philippines 9); Melai Cantiveros, Karla Estrada and Jolina Magdangal on Magandang Buhay (ABS-CBN 2); Cassy Legaspi, Mavy Legaspi and Carmina Villarroel on Sarap, 'Di Ba? (GMA 7); Gladys Reyes on MOMents (Net 25); Vice Ganda on Gandang Gabi Vice (ABS-CBN 2)	**Julius Babao on Bandila (ABS-CBN 2)**; Arnold Clavio on Saksi (GMA 7); Noli de Castro on TV Patrol (ABS-CBN 2); Alvin Elchico on TV Patrol Weekend (ABS-CBN 2; Mike Enriquez on 24 Oras (GMA 7); Ted Failon on TV Patrol (ABS-CBN 2); Raffy Tima on Balitanghali (GMA News TV 27)
Best Female Newscaster	Best Public Affairs Program Host
**Vicky Morales on 24 Oras (GMA 7)**; Luchi Cruz-Valdes on Aksyon (TV5); Karen Davila on Bandila (ABS-CBN 2); Bernadette Sembrano on TV Patrol (ABS-CBN 2); Jessica Soho on State of the Nation (GMA News TV); Mel Tiangco on 24 Oras (GMA 7); Pinky Webb on Balitaan (CNN Philippines 9)	**Boy Abunda on The Bottomline with Boy Abunda (ABS-CBN 2)**; Ruth Cabal on On the Record (CNN Philippines 9); Andrei Felix on Sports Desk (CNN Philippines 9); Rodante Marcoleta and Gen Subardiaga on Sa Ganang Mamamayan (Net 25); Winnie Monsod on Bawal ang Pasaway kay Mareng Winnie (GMA News TV); Daniel Razon on Get It Straight with Daniel Razon (UNTV 37); Pinky Webb on The Source (CNN Philippines 9)
Best Morning Show Host	Best Public Service Program Host
**Sarah Barba-Cabodil, Diego Castro III, Janis de Vera, Angela Lagunzad, Joseph Lee, Daniel Razon, Bong Santiago and Rheena Villamor on Good Morning Kuya (UNTV 37)**; Love Añover, Arnold Clavio, Lyn Ching, Nathaniel Cruz, Susan Enriquez, Suzi Entrata, Ivan Mayrina, Lhar Santiago, Connie Sison and Mariz Umali on Unang Hirit (GMA 7); Ariella Arida, Jeff Canoy, Jorge Cariño, Winnie Cordero, Gretchen Ho, Tina Marasigan, Amy Perez, Kori Quintos, Anthony Taberna, Bryan Termulo and Ariel Ureta (Umagang Kay Ganda/ABS-CBN 2); Chichi Atienza Valdepenas, Fifi delos Santos, Jules Guiang, Dianne Medina, Karla Paderna and Diane Querrer on Bagong Pilipinas (PTV 4); Earlo Bringas, Wej Cudiamat, Kristel Fesalbon, Genesis Gomez and Phoebe Publico on Pambansang Almusal (Net 25)	**Edinell Calvario on Healing Galing (TV5)**; Gus Abelgas on S.O.C.O.: Scene of the Crime Operatives (ABS-CBN 2); Julius Babao on Mission Possible (ABS-CBN 2); Karen Davila on My Puhunan (ABS-CBN 2); Alvin Elchico and Bernadette Sembrano on Salamat Dok (ABS-CBN 2); Mike Enriquez on Imbestigador (GMA 7); Vicky Morales on Wish Ko Lang (GMA 7)
Best Documentary Program Host	Best Magazine Show Host
**Atom Araullo on The Atom Araullo Specials (GMA 7)**; Kara David on Brigada (GMA News TV 27); Abner Mercado on No Filter (ABS-CBN 2); Maki Pulido and Jun Veneracion on Reporter's Notebook (GMA 7); Sandra Aguinaldo, Atom Araullo, Kara David, Howie Severino and Raffy Tima on I-Witness (GMA 7); Pinky Webb on CNN Philippines Presents (CNN Philippines)	**Jessica Soho on Kapuso Mo, Jessica Soho (GMA 7)**; Love Anover, Jay Arcilla, Maey Bautista, Bea Binene and Vicky Morales on Good News Kasama si Vicky Morales (GMA News TV 27); Cesar Apolinario and Susan Enriquez on IJuander (GMA News TV); Rovilson Fernandez on Ang Pinaka (GMA News TV); JR Langit and Rey Langit on Biyaheng Langit (PTV 4); JR Langit and Rey Langit on Kasangga Mo ang Langit (PTV 4); Korina Sanchez on Rated K (ABS-CBN 2)
Best Travel Show Host	Best Lifestyle Show Host
**Ernie Lopez on G Diaries (ABS-CBN 2)**; Drew Arellano on Biyahe ni Drew (GMA News TV 27); Kris Tiffany Janson and Pat Natividad on Cooltura (IBC 13)	**Gil Cuerva and Solenn Heussaff on Taste Buddies (GMA News TV 27)**; Michelle Dee, Winwyn Marquez and Thia Thomalla on Glow Up (GMA News TV 27); Dianne Medina on Loving What You Do (GMA News TV 27); Tonipet Gaba on Pop Talk (GMA News TV 27)
Best Educational Program Host	Best Children Show Host
**Kim Atienza on Matanglawin (ABS-CBN 2)**; **Dingdong Dantes on Amazing Earth (GMA 7)**; Drew Arellano on AHA! (GMA 7); Dyan Castillejo on Sports U (ABS-CBN 2); Kara David on Pinas Sarap (GMA News TV); Nielsen Donato and Ferdie Recio on Born to Be Wild (GMA 7); Boy Logro and Chynna Ortaleza on Idol sa Kusina (GMA News TV)	**Sedrick Ganolon, Madisen Go, Gracelle, Joace Jimenez, Anastacia Paronda and Candice Ayesha Paronda on Talents Academy (IBC 13)**; Christian Luke Alarcon, Eric Cabobos, Percida Capulong, Kimberly Enriquez, Christian Daniel Isip, Leane Manalanzan, Lexter Manalanzan, Liana Rose Manalanzan, Marcos Joaquin Paler, David Soriano, Angelica Tejana and Bency Braine Vallo on The KNC Show (UNTV 37); Dj Albert on Anong Say Nyo? (Net 25); Sally Lopez on Kid Kwento (Net 25)

== Special awards ==
=== Ading Fernando Lifetime Achievement Award ===
- Boy Abunda

=== Excellence in Broadcasting Lifetime Achievement Award ===
- Korina Sanchez

=== German Moreno Power Tandem Award ===
- Seth Fedelin and Andrea Brillantes

== Most major nominations ==
Nominations by Network
Nominations	Network
103	ABS-CBN 2
97	GMA 7
30	GMA News TV 27
13	Net 25
12	CNN Philippines 9
9	UNTV 37
7	PTV 4
7	IBC 13
5	TV5

== Most major wins ==
Wins by Network
Wins	Network
22	ABS-CBN 2
17	GMA 7
2	TV5
2	IBC 13
2	GMA News TV 27
1	Net 25
1	UNTV 37

== Performers ==
Name(s)	Performed
Christian Bautista	Ikaw Lamang
Gerald Santos	Why God Why?
Ima Castro	I Dreamed A Dream
Zsa Zsa Padilla	Maging Sino Ka Man

== See also ==
- PMPC Star Awards for TV
- 2020 in Philippine television
