= UNTV Broadcast Center =

Skyscraper in Quezon CIty, Philippines

- Render of the proposed design for the building
- Interactive map of the UNTV Broadcast Center area
- Alternative names: UNTV Tower; The Millennial Tower; The Philippine Broadcast Hub

General information
- Status: Under construction
- Type: Mixed-use
- Location: Quezon City
- Coordinates: 14°39′00″N 121°02′00″E
- Construction started: June 26, 2014; 12 years ago
- Estimated completion: TBA
- Owner: Breakthrough and Milestones Productions International

Height
- Antenna spire: 202.50 m (664.37 ft)

Technical details
- Floor count: 37
- Floor area: 1,428 square metres (15,370 sq ft)

Design and construction
- Architecture firm: Rchitects, Inc.
- Main contractor: Archipelago Builders; BAP Construction and Development Corporation

The UNTV Broadcast Center is a mixed-use skyscraper and broadcast facility, currently under construction, located along Epifanio delos Santos Avenue in Barangay Philam, Quezon City. It will serve as the new headquarters of UNTV-37, also known as UNTV News and Rescue / UNTV Public Service, a major UHF television channel. It will also house radio stations Radyo La Verdad 1350 kHz and Wish 107.5. In 2022, the glass cladding during construction was removed before being reinstalled.

== Background ==
The building is referred to as The Millennial Tower according to the firm Rchitects, Inc. and is now called as The Philippine Broadcast Hub based on UNTV's official website. It was built by Archipelago Builders while the second phase is awarded to BAP Construction and Development Corporation.

The building is owned by Breakthrough and Milestones Productions International, the content provider and major blocktimer of UNTV (DWAO-DTV), a broadcast station owned by the Progressive Broadcasting Corporation.

It is located near the former UNTV Building, the station's headquarters since July 2008. The 16-storey building with three discs on top will be built on a 1,428 square metres (15,370 sq ft) lot formerly occupied by the Transient Home of Kamanggagawa Foundation Inc. (KFI), a charitable institution run by the Members Church of God International, a Christian religious organization and UNTV's long-time partner.

Pending completion of the new building, UNTV relocated its studios, radio booths and production facilities at the La Verdad Christian College - Caloocan Campus in EDSA, Caloocan City.

== Construction ==
The groundbreaking ceremony for the UNTV Broadcast Center was held on June 26, 2014. It was aired live on UNTV's morning shows Good Morning Kuya and Get It Straight with Daniel Razon. The event is part of the station's 10th anniversary celebration with the theme "UNTV Big 10: Bigger. Better. Broader." headed by UNTV-BMPI Chairman and CEO Daniel Razon. Guest speakers during the event were Architect Jose Pedro "Bong" Recio of Rchitects Inc. and Quezon City Mayor Herbert Bautista. Also present during the event were UNTV-PBC President Alfredo "Atom" Henares and UNTV Chairman Emeritus Hilarion "Larry" Henares†.

== Features ==
The UNTV Broadcast Center will be a mixed-use skyscraper. A whole floor at the lower portion of the building will be designated for public service purposes such as legal, dental and medical services. A 400 square metres (4,300 sq ft) broadcast studio for news and public affairs programs along with photo and radio drama studios will be built. The building will also host a mini-concert hall, a 300-seating capacity auditorium for A Song of Praise (ASOP) Music Festival and other entertainment programs and a full-sized basketball court, which is planned as the new venue of UNTV Cup. A bike and jogging lane will be on the roof deck surrounded by glass panels. An accommodations area will be hosted at the 16th floor with free suites for employees and talents and a daycare area for employees with children.

Three disc structures and transmission tower will be constructed on top of the 16-storey building. The lower disc will have floating restaurant which can accommodate up to 200 guests. The middle disc will be a floating AM and FM radio studio for Radyo La Verdad 1350 kHz and Wish 107.5. The top disc will serve as a 360-degree observatory deck with coffee bar. The building's facade will be covered with LED panels to serve as advertising space for UNTV programs and other third-party advertisers.
