= 32nd PMPC Star Awards for Television =

- Date: October 14, 2018; October 28, 2018 (Delayed Telecast)
- Location: Henry Lee Irwin Theater, Ateneo de Manila University, Quezon City
- Presented by: Philippine Movie Press Club
- Hosted by: Julia Barretto; Robi Domingo; Raymond Gutierrez; Yassi Pressman; Jodi Sta. Maria

Television/radio coverage
- Network: ABS-CBN
- Produced by: Airtime Marketing Philippines, Inc.
- Directed by: Bert de Leon

The 32nd PMPC Star Awards for Television honored the best in Philippine television programming from 2017 until 2018, as chosen by the Philippine Movie Press Club. The ceremony was held on October 14, 2018, at the Henry Lee Irwin Theater in Ateneo de Manila University, Quezon City, and was aired the delayed telecast by ABS-CBN on October 28, 2018. The ceremony was hosted by Julia Barretto, Raymond Gutierrez, Robi Domingo, Yassi Pressman and Jodi Sta. Maria.

The nominations were announced by the Press on October 5, 2018.

== Winners and Nominees ==
Winners are listed first and highlighted in bold:

=== Networks ===
Best TV Station
- **ABS-CBN 2**
  - PTV 4
  - TV5
  - GMA 7
  - CNN Philippines 9
  - GMA News TV 11
  - IBC 13
  - Net 25
  - UNTV 37

=== Programs ===
Best Primetime Drama Series	Best Daytime Drama Series
**The Good Son (ABS-CBN 2)**; Bagani (ABS-CBN 2); The Blood Sisters (ABS-CBN 2); Inday Will Always Love You (GMA 7); Kambal, Karibal (GMA 7); Sherlock Jr. (GMA 7); Since I Found You (ABS-CBN 2)	**Contessa (GMA 7)**; Asintado (ABS-CBN 2); Hanggang Saan (ABS-CBN 2); Hindi Ko Kayang Iwan Ka (GMA 7); Precious Hearts Romances Presents: Araw Gabi (ABS-CBN 2); Sana Dalawa ang Puso (ABS-CBN 2); The Stepdaughters (GMA 7)
Best Drama Anthology	Best Horror/Fantasy Program
**Ipaglaban Mo (ABS-CBN 2)**; Dear Uge (GMA 7); Karelasyon (GMA 7); Magpakailanman (GMA 7); Maynila (GMA 7); Tadhana (GMA 7); Wagas (GMA News TV 11)	**Wansapanataym (ABS-CBN 2)**; Daig Kayo Ng Lola Ko (GMA 7); Sirkus (GMA 7)
Best Comedy Show	Best Gag Show
**Pepito Manaloto (GMA 7)**; Hapi Ang Buhay (Net 25); Hashtag Michael Angelo The Sitcom (GMA News TV 11); Home Sweetie Home (ABS-CBN 2)	**Goin' Bulilit (ABS-CBN 2)**; Banana Sundae (ABS-CBN 2)
Best Variety Show	Best Musical Variety Show
**Sunday PinaSaya (GMA 7)**; Bossing & Ai (GMA 7); It's Showtime (ABS-CBN 2); Wowowin (GMA 7)	**Letters and Music (Net 25)**; Beautiful Sunday (Net 25)
Best Celebrity Talk Show	Best News Program
**Tonight with Boy Abunda (ABS-CBN 2)**; Gandang Gabi Vice (ABS-CBN 2); Magandang Buhay (ABS-CBN 2); MARS (GMA News TV 11); MOMents (Net 25); RYTS: Rule Yourself to Success (Net 25); Tonight with Arnold Clavio (GMA News TV 11)	**TV Patrol (ABS-CBN 2)**; 24 Oras (GMA 7); Aksyon Prime (TV5); Balitaan (CNN Philippines 9); Balitanghali (GMA News TV 11); Bandila (ABS-CBN 2); Saksi (GMA 7); State of the Nation with Jessica Soho (GMA News TV 11)
Best Public Affairs Program	Best Morning Show
**The Bottomline with Boy Abunda (ABS-CBN 2)**; Bawal ang Pasaway kay Mareng Winnie (GMA News TV 11); Get It Straight with Daniel Razon (UNTV 37); Iskoolmates (PTV 4); Sa Ganang Mamamayan (Net 25); The Source (CNN Philippines 9); Tapatan Ni Tunying (ABS-CBN 2)	**Umagang Kay Ganda (ABS-CBN 2)**; Good Morning Kuya (UNTV 37); Good Morning Pilipinas (PTV 4); Pambansang Almusal (Net 25); Unang Hirit (GMA 7)
Best Public Service Program	Best Documentary Program
**Healing Galing (TV5)**; Imbestigador (GMA 7); Mission Possible (ABS-CBN 2); My Puhunan (ABS-CBN 2); Red Alert (ABS-CBN 2); Salamat Dok (ABS-CBN 2); Wish Ko Lang (GMA 7)	**I-Witness (GMA 7)**; Brigada (GMA News TV 11); Investigative Documentaries (GMA News TV 11); Reel Time (GMA News TV 11); Reporter's Notebook (GMA 7); Tunay na Buhay (GMA 7)
Best Documentary Special	Best Magazine Show
**Paglayang Minamahal (ABS-CBN 2)**; Bakas Ng Sigwa (PTV 4)	**Kapuso Mo, Jessica Soho (GMA 7)**; Ang Pinaka (GMA News TV 11); Day Off (GMA News TV 11); Good News Kasama si Vicky Morales (GMA News TV 11); IJuander (GMA News TV 11); Profiles (CNN Philippines 9); Rated K (ABS-CBN 2)
Best Travel Show	Best Lifestyle Show
**G Diaries (ABS-CBN 2)**; Biyahe ni Drew (GMA News TV 11); Landmarks (Net 25); Sagisag Kultura (PTV 4)	**The World of Gandang Ricky Reyes (GMA News TV 11)**; Taste Buddies (GMA News TV 11); Taumbahay (Net 25)
Best Educational Program	Best Children Show
**Matanglawin (ABS-CBN 2)**; AHA! (GMA 7); Born to Be Wild (GMA 7); Idol sa Kusina (GMA News TV 11); Pinas Sarap (GMA News TV 11); Say Mo Doc (GMA News TV 11)	**Homework (Net 25)**; The KNC Show (UNTV 37); Word Hub (Net 25)

=== Personalities ===
Best Drama Actor	Best Drama Actress
**Joshua Garcia on The Good Son (ABS-CBN 2)**; **Jerome Ponce on The Good Son (ABS-CBN 2)**; Nash Aguas on The Good Son (ABS-CBN 2); Arjo Atayde on Hanggang Saan (ABS-CBN 2); JM de Guzman on Precious Hearts Romances Presents: Araw Gabi (ABS-CBN 2); Coco Martin on Ang Probinsyano (ABS-CBN 2); Enrique Gil on Bagani (ABS-CBN 2); Piolo Pascual on Since I Found You (ABS-CBN 2)	**Yasmien Kurdi on Hindi Ko Kayang Iwan Ka (GMA 7)**; Glaiza de Castro on Contessa (GMA 7); Erich Gonzales on The Blood Sisters (ABS-CBN 2); Katrina Halili on The Stepdaughters (GMA 7); Julia Montes on Asintado (ABS-CBN 2); Sylvia Sanchez on Hanggang Saan (ABS-CBN 2); Liza Soberano on Bagani (ABS-CBN 2); Jodi Sta. Maria on Sana Dalawa ang Puso (ABS-CBN 2)
Best Drama Supporting Actor	Best Drama Supporting Actress
**Gabby Eigenmann on Contessa (GMA 7)**; Christopher de Leon on Sana Dalawa ang Puso (ABS-CBN 2); Gary Estrada on The Stepdaughters (GMA 7); John Estrada on The Good Son (ABS-CBN 2); Matteo Guidicelli on Bagani (ABS-CBN 2); Jhong Hilario on Ang Probinsyano (ABS-CBN 2); Arnold Reyes on Hanggang Saan (ABS-CBN 2); Ariel Rivera on Hanggang Saan (ABS-CBN 2)	**Kyline Alcantara on Kambal, Karibal (GMA 7)**; **Lorna Tolentino on Asintado (ABS-CBN 2)**; Mylene Dizon on The Good Son (ABS-CBN 2); Shaina Magdayao on Asintado (ABS-CBN 2); Pauline Mendoza on Kambal, Karibal (GMA 7); Yassi Pressman on Ang Probinsyano (ABS-CBN 2); Susan Roces on Ang Probinsyano (ABS-CBN 2); Eula Valdez on The Good Son (ABS-CBN 2)
Best Single Performance by An Actor	Best Single Performance by An Actress
**James Blanco on Maalaala Mo Kaya: Hapag Kainan (ABS-CBN 2)**; **Ruru Madrid on Magpakailanman: Takbo Ng Buhay Ko (GMA 7)**; McCoy de Leon on Ipaglaban Mo: Katiwala (ABS-CBN 2); Joross Gamboa on Maalaala Mo Kaya: Alkansya (ABS-CBN 2); Angelo Ilagan on Maalaala Mo Kaya: Lambat (ABS-CBN 2); Zaijan Jaranilla on Ipaglaban Mo: Titser (ABS-CBN 2); Alden Richards on Magpakailanman: Kuwentong Marawi sa Mata ng Isang Sundalo (GMA 7); Ian Veneracion on Maalaala Mo Kaya: Portrait (ABS-CBN 2)	**Kim Chiu on Ipaglaban Mo: Korea (ABS-CBN 2)**; Ana Capri on Maalaala Mo Kaya: Medalya (ABS-CBN 2); Gloria Diaz on Ipaglaban Mo: Daya (ABS-CBN 2); Denise Laurel on Maalaala Mo Kaya: Hapag Kainan (ABS-CBN 2); Pokwang on Maalaala Mo Kaya: Eskoba (ABS-CBN 2); Ina Raymundo on Maalaala Mo Kaya: Sunflower (ABS-CBN 2); Claire Ruiz on Maalaala Mo Kaya: Bibliya (ABS-CBN 2); Sharlene San Pedro on Maalaala Mo Kaya: Rubber Shoes (ABS-CBN 2)
Best Child Performer	Best New Male TV Personality
**Seth dela Cruz on Hindi Ko Kayang Iwan Ka (GMA 7)**; Leanne Bautista on The Cure (GMA 7); Caprice Cayetano on Hindi Ko Kayang Iwan Ka (GMA 7); Yñigo Delen on Since I Found You (ABS-CBN 2); Sofia Pablo on Sherlock Jr. (GMA 7); Nayomi "Heart" Ramos on Ang Probinsyano (ABS-CBN 2); Zachie Rivera on The Stepdaughters (GMA 7); Karlo Ezekiel Torres on The Blood Sisters (ABS-CBN 2)	**Tenten "Kendoll" Mendoza on Eat Bulaga! (GMA 7)**; Greg Hawkins on It's Showtime (ABS-CBN 2); Charles Kieron on Asintado (ABS-CBN 2); Ronwaldo Martin on Ang Probinsyano (ABS-CBN 2); Kelvin Miranda on Bubble Gang (GMA 7); Markus Paterson on Sana Dalawa ang Puso (ABS-CBN 2); Wilbert Ross on It's Showtime (ABS-CBN 2); Henz Villaraiz on Sana Dalawa ang Puso (ABS-CBN 2)
Best New Female TV Personality	Best Comedy Actor
**Heaven Peralejo on Wansapanataym Presents: Jasmin's Flower Power (ABS-CBN 2)**; Mary Joy Apostol on Maalaala Mo Kaya: Portrait (ABS-CBN 2); Tricia Bersano on Iskoolmates (PTV 4); Charlie Dizon on Bagani (ABS-CBN 2); Jackie Gonzaga on It's Showtime (ABS-CBN 2); Maxine Medina on Hanggang Saan (ABS-CBN 2)	**Ogie Alcasid on Home Sweetie Home (ABS-CBN 2)**; Jobert Austria on Banana Sundae (ABS-CBN 2); Ryan Bang on Banana Sundae (ABS-CBN 2); Sef Cadayona on Bubble Gang (GMA 7); Jayson Gainza on Banana Sundae (ABS-CBN 2); Piolo Pascual on Home Sweetie Home (ABS-CBN 2); Pooh on Banana Sundae (ABS-CBN 2); Michael V. on Pepito Manaloto (GMA 7)
Best Comedy Actress	Best Male TV Host
**Rufa Mae Quinto on Home Sweetie Home (ABS-CBN 2)**; Sunshine Garcia on Banana Sundae (ABS-CBN 2); Toni Gonzaga on Home Sweetie Home (ABS-CBN 2); Angelica Panganiban on Banana Sundae (ABS-CBN 2); Manilyn Reynes on Pepito Manaloto (GMA 7); Chariz Solomon on Bubble Gang (GMA 7); Nova Villa on Pepito Manaloto (GMA 7)	**Alden Richards on Eat Bulaga! (GMA 7)**; Robi Domingo on ASAP (ABS-CBN 2); Vice Ganda on It's Showtime (ABS-CBN 2); Luis Manzano on ASAP (ABS-CBN 2); Vhong Navarro on It's Showtime (ABS-CBN 2); Piolo Pascual on ASAP (ABS-CBN 2); Willie Revillame on Wowowin (GMA 7); Vic Sotto on Eat Bulaga! (GMA 7)
Best Female TV Host	Best Talent Search Program Host
**Maine Mendoza on Eat Bulaga! (GMA 7)**; Anne Curtis on It's Showtime (ABS-CBN 2); Ai-Ai delas Alas on Sunday PinaSaya (GMA 7); Sarah Geronimo on ASAP (ABS-CBN 2); Toni Gonzaga on ASAP (ABS-CBN 2); Jolina Magdangal on ASAP (ABS-CBN 2); Amy Perez on It's Showtime (ABS-CBN 2); Marian Rivera on Sunday PinaSaya (GMA 7)	**Luis Manzano on I Can See Your Voice (ABS-CBN 2)**; Billy Crawford on Little Big Shots (ABS-CBN 2); Billy Crawford on Your Face Sounds Familiar Kids (ABS-CBN 2)
Best Celebrity Talk Show Host	Best Male Newscaster
**Boy Abunda on Tonight with Boy Abunda (ABS-CBN 2)**; Melai Cantiveros, Karla Estrada and Jolina Magdangal on Magandang Buhay (ABS-CBN 2); Arnold Clavio on Tonight with Arnold Clavio (GMA News TV 11); Suzie Entrata and Camille Prats on MARS (GMA News TV 11); Vice Ganda on Gandang Gabi Vice (ABS-CBN 2); Neo "Kuya E" Padua on RYTS: Rule Yourself to Success (Net 25); Gladys Reyes on MOMents (Net 25)	**Raffy Tima on Balitanghali (GMA News TV 11)**; Julius Babao on Bandila (ABS-CBN 2); Arnold Clavio on Saksi (GMA 7); Noli De Castro on TV Patrol (ABS-CBN 2); Mike Enriquez on 24 Oras (GMA 7); Ted Failon on TV Patrol (ABS-CBN 2); Howie Severino on News to Go (GMA News TV 11)
Best Female Newscaster	Best Public Affairs Program Host
**Bernadette Sembrano on TV Patrol (ABS-CBN 2)**; Pia Arcangel on 24 Oras Weekend (GMA 7); Luchi Cruz-Valdes on Aksyon Prime (TV5); Karen Davila on Bandila (ABS-CBN 2); Vicky Morales on 24 Oras (GMA 7); Jessica Soho on State of the Nation with Jessica Soho (GMA News TV 11); Mel Tiangco on 24 Oras (GMA 7); Pinky Webb on Balitaan (CNN Philippines 9)	**Boy Abunda on The Bottomline with Boy Abunda (ABS-CBN 2)**; Pia Hontiveros on On The Record (CNN Philippines 9); Rodante Marcoleta and Genycil Subardiaga on Sa Ganang Mamamayan (Net 25); Winnie Monsod on Bawal ang Pasaway kay Mareng Winnie (GMA News TV 11); Daniel Razon on Get It Straight with Daniel Razon (UNTV 37); Anthony Taberna on Tapatan Ni Tunying (ABS-CBN 2); Pinky Webb on The Source (CNN Philippines 9)
Best Morning Show Host	Best Public Service Program Host
**Love Añover, Pia Arcangel, Lyn Ching, Arnold Clavio, Nathaniel Cruz, Susan Enriquez, Suzi Entrata, Ivan Mayrina, Lhar Santiago and Connie Sison on Unang Hirit (GMA 7)**; John Bertiz, Alfonso Delos Santos, Jules Guiang, Dianne Medina, Karla Paderna, Diane Querrer on Good Morning Pilipinas (PTV 4); Earlo Bringas, Claire Cuenca, Nicole Facal, Julie Fernando, Genesis Gomez, Leo Martinez and Phoebe Publico on Pambansang Almusal (Net 25); Jorge Cariño, Winnie Cordero, Gretchen Ho, Amy Perez, Anthony Taberna and Ariel Ureta on Umagang Kay Ganda (ABS-CBN 2); Diego Castro III, Erica “Kikay” Honrado, Angela Lagunzad, Daniel Razon, Beth Santiago, Erin Tañada and Rheena Villamor-Camara on Good Morning Kuya (UNTV 37)	**Vicky Morales on Wish Ko Lang (GMA 7)**; Gus Abelgas on S.O.C.O.: Scene of the Crime Operatives (ABS-CBN 2); Julius Babao on Mission Possible (ABS-CBN 2); Jeff Canoy on Red Alert (ABS-CBN 2); Karen Davila on My Puhunan (ABS-CBN 2); Ted Failon on Failon Ngayon (ABS-CBN 2); Bernadette Sembrano on Salamat Dok (ABS-CBN 2)
Best Documentary Program Host	Best Magazine Show Host
**Sandra Aguinaldo, Atom Araullo, Kara David, Howie Severino, Jay Taruc and Mariz Umali on I-Witness (GMA 7)**; Malou Mangahas on Investigative Documentaries (GMA News TV 11); Maki Pulido and Raffy Tima on Reporter's Notebook (GMA 7); Rhea Santos on Tunay Na Buhay (GMA 7); Jessica Soho on Brigada (GMA News TV 11)	**Korina Sanchez on Rated K (ABS-CBN 2)**; Love Añover, Cesar Apolinario, Susan Enriquez and Vicky Morales on IJuander (GMA News TV 11); Bea Binene and Vicky Morales on Good News Kasama si Vicky Morales (GMA News TV 11); Mitzi Borromeo on Profiles (CNN Philippines 9); Ken Chan and Janine Gutierrez on Day Off (GMA News TV 11); Rovilson Fernandez on Ang Pinaka (GMA News TV 11); Jessica Soho on Kapuso Mo, Jessica Soho (GMA 7)
Best Travel Show Host	Best Lifestyle Show Host
**Gina Lopez on G Diaries (ABS-CBN 2)**; Hero Angeles and Lara Maigue on Sagisag Kultura (PTV 4); Drew Arellano on Biyahe ni Drew (GMA News TV 11); Indra Cepeda and Dolly Malgapo on Landmarks (Net 25)	**Ricky Reyes on The World of Gandang Ricky Reyes (GMA News TV 11)**; Monalise Aguilar, Mabel Cruz, Claire Cuenca, Julie Fernando and Mylene Mariano Rivera on Taumbahay (Net 25); Solenn Heussaff and Rhian Ramos on Taste Buddies (GMA News TV 11)
Best Educational Program Host	Best Children Show Host
**Kim Atienza on Matanglawin (ABS-CBN 2)**; Drew Arellano on AHA! (GMA 7); Susan Barlin, Maggie dela Riva and Anna Rivera on Say Mo Doc (GMA News TV 11); Dingdong Dantes on Amazing Earth (GMA 7); Kara David on Pinas Sarap (GMA News TV 11); Boy Logro on Idol sa Kusina (GMA News TV 11); Ferds Recio on Born to Be Wild (GMA 7)	**Sally Lopez on Homework (Net 25)**; Christian Luke Alarcon, Eric Cabobos, Percida Capulong, Kimberly Enriquez, Christian Daniel Isip, Leanne Manalanzan, Liana Manalanzan, MJ Paler, David Soriano, Angelica Tejana and Bency Braine Vallo on The KNC Show (UNTV 37); DJ Albert on Word Hub (Net 25)

== Special awards ==
=== Ading Fernando Lifetime Achievement Award ===
- Herbert Bautista

=== Excellence in Broadcasting Lifetime Achievement Award ===
- Arnold Clavio

=== German Moreno Power Tandem Award ===
- Coco Martin and Yassi Pressman

=== Hall of Fame Award ===
- ASAP (ABS-CBN 2) (Best Musical Variety Show)

=== Stars of the Night ===
- Greg Hawkins (Male)
- Julia Barretto (Female)

=== Glupa Glowing Guy and Gal ===
- McCoy de Leon and Heaven Peralejo

=== Frontrow Celebrity of the Night ===
- Ken Chan (Male)
- Tori Garcia (Female)

=== Faces of the Night ===
- Ken Chan (Male)
- Yassi Pressman (Female)

== Most major nominations ==
Nominations by Network
Nominations	Network
131	ABS-CBN 2
70	GMA 7
38	GMA News TV 11
20	Net 25
8	PTV 4
8	CNN Philippines 9
7	UNTV 37
4	TV5
1	IBC 13

== Most major wins ==
Wins by Network
Wins	Network
27	ABS-CBN 2
16	GMA 7
3	GMA News TV 11
3	Net 25
1	TV5

== Performers ==
Name(s)	Performed
Daryl Ong; Angeline Quinto	Perfect Strangers
Kim Chiu; G Force	Dura
Broadway Boys (Benedict Aboyme, Francis Aglabtin, Joshua Lumbao and Joshua Torino); Mitoy Yonting	Barry Manilow Medley: Mandy; I Write the Songs; I Made It Through the Rain; Looks Like We Made It; Copacabana
Jerome Ponce; McCoy de Leon; Charles Kieron; Heaven Peralejo; Vivoree Esclito; Michelle Vito	Dance Medley
Jayda Avanzado; Kiana Valenciano; Isabela Vinzon	Ariana Grande Medley
Vina Morales	Eres Mio

== See also ==
- PMPC Star Awards for TV
- 2018 in Philippine television
