= UNTV (disambiguation) =

UNTV is one of the television networks in the Philippines.

UNTV may also refer to:

- UN Web TV, formerly known as United Nations Television
- DWAO-DTV, the flagship station of UNTV
- DZXQ-AM, the Radio station of Radyo La Verdad 1350
