= UNTV Transmitter =

UNTV Transmitter Tower
- Interactive map of the UNTV Transmitter Tower area

General information
- Type: Communications tower
- Location: Antipolo, Philippines
- Coordinates: 14°36′29″N 121°09′53″E
- Construction started: 2012
- Completed: 2013
- Opening: 2014
- Owner: Breakthrough and Milestones Productions International, Inc. (BMPI); UNTV News and Rescue

The UNTV Transmitter is a 328 ft (100.0 m) communication tower owned by Breakthrough and Milestones Productions International, Inc. located at Emerald Hills, Sumulong Highway, Antipolo, Rizal, Republic of the Philippines. It serves as the new transmitter facility for flagship stations DWAO-TV (UNTV News and Rescue) and DWNU, with broadcast licenses owned by the stations founder Progressive Broadcasting Corporation.

== History ==
In July 2013, BMPI Chairman and CEO Daniel Razon announced the network's plan of upgrading its facilities, in preparation for its transition from analog to the Japanese ISDB-T digital system. The construction of the new transmitter began in early 2013, completed before the end of the year and became fully operational in January 2014. Upon the launch, the tower replaced its old transmitter under a lease agreement at Crestview Subdivision in Antipolo, Rizal since 2001. In July 2014, when BMPI took over the management of PBC's 107.5, DWNU also shifted its transmitter to the UNTV Tower.

== Features ==
=== Transmitter ===
UNTV acquired its new analog and digital broadcast equipment from Digital Multimedia Technologies (DMT) System Engineering Solutions (SyES). SyES has been in the manufacturing industry for over 30 years with headquarters in Lissone, Italy. The 328 ft (100.0 m) tower uses highly efficient SyES complete antenna system (COEL brand) to produce a wide coverage of UHF analog and digital TV reception in Metro Manila, Bulacan, Pampanga, Laguna, Batangas, Cavite and Rizal. with a 30,000-watt TPO in UHF 37 (analog) and up to a maximum of 10,000-watt TPO in UHF 38 (digital). It serves as the originating transmitter for its relay stations in the provinces.

On October 2, 2014, UNTV began its simulcast test broadcast on UHF channel 38 (617.143 MHz) with two standard definition (SD) channels, one high-definition (HD) channel and one 1seg channel. UNTV's low-powered DTV test broadcast can be received in Metro Manila and nearby provinces using ISDB-T set top boxes, LED TV sets and mobile devices with built-in ISDB-T tuners. In a DTV signal test conducted by Starmobile last April 2015, UNTV was present in eight out of 14 locations in Metro Manila with decent signal strength of three (3) up to the maximum of four (4) signal bars.

For FM, BMPI transferred the 25-kilowatt Nautel NV30 FM transmitter, acquired in 2010 by PBC for its former partnership with ZimZam Management of Mr. Manuelito Luzon, from Crestview Subdivision to Emerald Hills when it acquired the operations of 107.5 FM in 2014. Win Radio meanwhile transferred its Manila station to Mabuhay Broadcasting System's DWKY 91.5 FM, which transmits programs to an in-house facility at the Summit One Tower in Mandaluyong. Wish FM initially suffered a poor signal reception during its grand launching but later on, it dramatically improved its signal reception in Mega Manila after a series of technical adjustments on its transmission settings.

The transmitter is being controlled from UNTV headquarters in Quezon City via studio/transmitter link (STL) facility.

=== Transmitter facility ===
A concrete transmitter control room was built on the ground beneath the tower. It houses the transmitter equipment for UNTV, Truth Channel and Wish FM, power supply, cooling system and backup generator sets. The site also has satellite uplink and downlink facility inside the compound.

== See also ==
- UNTV
- DWAO-TV
- DZXQ
- DWNU
- Progressive Broadcasting Corporation
- Members Church of God International
- List of famous transmission sites
- List of tallest towers in the world
