= Ayra Mariano =

Filipino actress

- Born: January 10, 1998 (age 28); Northern Marianas Islands
- Education: Asian Institute for Distance Education
- Occupation: Actress
- Years active: 2015–present
- Agents: GMA Artist Center (2015–2021); UNTV (2021–present)
- Known for: First Princess of StarStruck; Nikki in Meant to Be; Kyla in Poor Senorita
- Height: 1.58 m (5 ft 2 in)

Ayra Mariano (Note: Ayra Mariano was born in Northern Marianas Islands, United States. Thus, she does not possess her mother's maiden name which is Samaniego.) (born January 10, 1998) is a Filipino actress. She first became known through a television commercial for Eskinol before participating in Starstruck Season 6, where she finished First Princess.

== Early life ==
Mariano was born in Northern Mariana Islands and grew up in Bocaue, Bulacan, Philippines.

== Career ==
She became known after being crowned as the First Princess of Starstruck 6. She then acted in supporting roles in shows such as Poor Señorita, Meant to be, Mulawin vs Ravena, G.R.I.N.D. Get Ready It's A New Day, Inday Will Always Love You and Sahaya.

In 2022, Mariano transferred to UNTV for her first morning program hosting stint Good Morning Kuya, with original host Kuya Daniel Razon with her co-host Joshua Dionisio, Ian Mercado and Tini Balanon.

== Filmography ==
Television performances
Year	Title	Role
2015	StarStruck 6	Herself/1st Princess
2016; 2017	Pepito Manaloto	Herself/MOS Host
2016; 2017	Mars	Herself/Guest
2016; 2017	iBilib	Herself/Guest/Guest Co-Host
2016; 2017	Pop Talk	Herself/Guest
2016	Taste Buddies	Herself/Guest
2016	#AySonOnMaynila	Yanny
2016	Dear Uge	Jaymee/Coleen
2016	Poor Señorita	Kyla dela Cruz
2016	Dangwa	Joni
2016	Bubble Gang	Herself/Guest
2016	Love Hotline: Binata Na si Totoy	Belle
2016	Kapuso Mo Jessica Soho	Herself/Guest
2017	G.R.I.N.D. Get Ready It's A New Day	Lui Gonzales
2017	Road Trip	Herself/Guest
2017	Jackpot en Poy	Herself/Guest
2017	Kantaririt	Herself/Guest
2017	Wowowin	Herself/Guest
2017	#MLABrunoAyra	Leovie
2017	Magpakailanman: #KenAyraAsLanceElla	Ella
2017	Mulawin vs. Ravena	Selda
2017	Meant To Be	Nikki
2017	#MLAChakaAndTheBae	Ma. Cristina "Neneng" Franciloso
2018	AHA!	Herself/Special Guest
2018	Maynila: Magkapatid, Magkaribal	Peachy
2018	Inday Will Always Love You	Sunshine Fuentes
2018	Dear Uge: To-Gather Again	Mishka
2018	Wagas: Ang Tinig ni Jennifer	Jennifer
2018	Ang Forever Ko'y Ikaw	Marione
2018	The One That Got Away	Mikaela "Ekay" Makalintal
2018	Bossing & Ai	Herself/Guest
2019	Wagas: Wait Lang, Is This Love	Bane
2019	Sahaya	Hadiya
2021	Heartful Café	Mars
2022	Kristiano Drama: Pagkatapos ng Unos	Liezel
2022	Good Morning Kuya	Herself/Host

== Notes ==
Awards and achievements
Preceded by Diva Montelaba	StarStruck; Runner-up; 2015 (season 6)	Succeeded by Lexi Gonzales
