= DWNU =

Radio station in Metro Manila, Philippines

Wish 107.5 (DWNU)
- Wish 107.5 logo since 2015
- Caloocan; Philippines
- Broadcast area: Mega Manila and surrounding areas
- Frequency: 107.5 MHz
- RDS: WISH FM
- Branding: Wish 107.5

Programming
- Language: English
- Format: Soft Adult Contemporary, OPM

Ownership
- Owner: Progressive Broadcasting Corporation
- Operator: Breakthrough and Milestones Productions International
- Sister stations: Through BMPI: Radyo La Verdad 1350; Through PBC: DWAO-DTV (UNTV)

History
- First air date: August 31, 1987
- Former names: NU 107 (August 31, 1987 – November 7, 2010); Win Radio (November 8, 2010 – June 26, 2014)
- Call sign meaning: Pronounced as "new" (former branding)

Technical information
- Licensing authority: NTC
- Class: A, B and C
- Power: 25,000 watts
- ERP: 75,000 watts

Links
- Website: www.wish1075.com

DWNU (107.5 FM), broadcasting as Wish 107.5 (pronounced as Wish one-o-seven-five), is a radio station owned by Progressive Broadcasting Corporation and operated by Breakthrough and Milestones Productions International (BMPI), the media arm of the Members Church of God International (MCGI). The station's studio is located at La Verdad Christian College - Caloocan Building, 351 EDSA, Brgy. Bagong Barrio West, Caloocan, while its transmitter is located at the UNTV Transmitter Complex, Sumulong Highway, Antipolo.

Online, Wish 107.5's first official YouTube channel is currently the Philippines' No. 1 YouTube channel by a local FM station with more than 4.4 billion views and 15.2 million subscribers and got its Diamond Play button from YouTube Creators Awards. The 2nd official YouTube account Wish 1075 (Wish USA) also got more than 384 million views and 2.37 millions subscribers.

== History ==
=== 1987–2010: NU 107 ===
==== Late 1980s ====
Final NU 107 logo prior to sign off on November 8, 2010

On August 31, 1987, an unnamed radio station began broadcasting on 107.5 FM, playing new wave music without call letters or DJs for a month. Upon revealing itself as “DWNU” and inviting listeners to call, its phone lines were inundated for three hours. At the time, its studios were located in Paseo De Roxas, Makati.

NU 107 was conceived by radio veteran Mike Pedero and businessman Atom Henares. Their vision was to establish a benchmark for youth music, with NU 107 broadcasting “dynamic, young, passionate, creative” rock music, aiming to set a new standard for musical taste.

NU 107 first hit the airwaves on October 31, 1987, being one of two FM stations (the other being Power 105 BM FM (now 105.1 Brigada News FM Manila) that played the latest new wave and punk hits during that time. It was also known as the station that inherited the format of WXB 102 (now 102.7 Star FM), which went off air a few months before the birth of NU 107. Meanwhile, the other rock station on the Metro Manila FM bandwidth, Boss Radio DZRJ 100.3 (now 100.3 RJFM), usually played classic rock of the '60s and '70s unlike NU 107 and Power 105 BM FM. Banker Atom Henares started the radio station in 1987, playing new wave music for about six weeks on the 107.5 MHz frequency. After that, when the station's tagline "The Home of New Rock" was aired and their telephone number was announced, the station's telephone rang for three hours straight.

President Corazon Aquino issued an executive order requiring radio stations to air at least three Original Pilipino Music (OPM) hourly; the station asked for contributions from listeners, under the program "In the Raw". The station also instituted the NU Rock Awards, in which the inaugural edition had guests such as Joey Pepe Smith, Freddie Aguilar and Grace Nono, to honor the country's best rock musicians. With Henares were Mike Pedero, who would later become its vice-president, and Cris Hermosisima who would later become the station manager. Back then, its studios were located at the Solidbank Building (now PSBank Center) along Paseo de Roxas in Makati.

==== 1990s ====
In the 1990s, NU 107 mainly played American grunge and alternative rock hits from bands like Nirvana, Soundgarden, Pearl Jam and Silverchair. Also, during that decade, the station played demos and songs from Filipino rock bands, most of which were unsigned. As a result, bands such as The Youth, Yano, Razorback, Wolfgang, Eraserheads, AfterImage and Rivermaya, among others, became highly popular as the Pinoy rock scene surged the airwaves. Later, the station formulated the show "In the Raw", which featured demos from amateur bands.

In 1994, NU 107 held its first NU Rock Awards, which honored the country's most distinguished rock artists every year. The NU Rock Awards was held annually until 2010.

Furthermore, NU 107 had a music chart show, the "Midnight Countdown", which was held every Sunday midnight, charting the top 12 rock songs every week. Among the most popular hits that topped the "Midnight Countdown" were "Paris" by Filipino band Chicosci (which lasted 52 weeks) and "Shimmer" by American band Fuel (which lasted for a year).

Among the popular radio shows on NU 107 during the '90s were "The Crossroads", which played blues and classic rock; "Euro Rock", which played European rock music; "Against the Flow", which played Christian rock; and "Not Radio", which played foreign indie music; and the morning show "Zach and Joey in the Morning". By 1994, NU 107 emerged as the number one in the AB market, or the upscale listeners, among commercial radio stations in Metro Manila at 32% according to the Radio Research Council, Inc. The station also opened their fourth station in Davao City to go along with its flagship Metro Manila station, and Cebu City and Iloilo City stations in the Visayas.

This period saw NU 107 introducing a number of innovations in the Philippine music scene. Another innovation was the idea of the NU 107 Pocket Concerts, which were concerts held in various malls. Prior to this, concerts of that size were simply not held. They became relatively common after the success of the first NU 107 Pocket Concerts.

==== 2000s ====
NU 107 then played nu metal music (popularly known among Filipino rock fans as the "kupaw" subgenre) popularized by Filipino bands Slapshock, Greyhoundz, Queso (formerly Cheese), and Chicosci (formerly Chico Science); and foreign bands like the Deftones, Korn, Limp Bizkit and Slipknot. Later, the station popularized Cebuano rock bands like Urbandub, Frank!, Sheila and the Insects, Junior Kilat, and Franco.

Meanwhile, in 2001, the Progressive Broadcasting Corporation aired the TV counterpart of NU 107, UNTV 37 (now UNTV News and Rescue, which eventually became the first public service channel in Philippine Television), on the free UHF band. The TV station, now operated and managed by Breakthrough and Milestones Productions International, an affiliate of a religious group known for its program Ang Dating Daan, the Members Church of God International (MCGI), used to play music videos of songs played on NU 107. It also aired the TV version of "In The Raw" and clips from past NU Rock Awards and NU 107 events like the Summer Shebang, Pocket Concerts and Party Monsters on the Loose.

For a while, the station popularized the emo rock subgenre, playing foreign hits from foreign bands like The Used and My Chemical Romance and local emo bands like Typecast and Blue Boy Bites Back. In the late 2000s, indie pop became popular on the station with the rise of Filipino indie pop bands Up Dharma Down, Taken by Cars, Pedicab and Narda.

Also in this decade, bands who were first featured on "In The Raw" like Sugarfree, Twisted Halo, Itchyworms and Silent Sanctuary rose to mainstream fame. In 2005, the "Midnight Countdown" was transformed into the "Stairway to Seven", NU 107's daily countdown of the top seven most popular rock hits. NU 107 also introduced an array of shows, like "Dredd at the Control", "Time Bomb", "Metal Madness", "Let's Fun", "University Rock", "Rock Ed Radio", "Pirate Satellite" and "The Room". In 2007, the station celebrated its 20th anniversary with the 2007 NU Rock Awards. Hermosisima, the station's network operations head, remarked to the Philippine Daily Inquirer that the station will continue on its current format "and we exert every possible means to keep it alive, especially in relation to the local rock scene."

==== The end of NU 107 ====
Former DJ Joyce Ann Burton Titular, popularly known as Jaedee, disclosed on her blog that NU 107 would close down in 2011, reportedly due to financial constraints (brought about by lack of advertisers' support) and poor ratings (as it struggled against other stations such as 90.7 Love Radio, IFM 93.9, Barangay LS 97.1 and Tambayan 101.9), which was later confirmed at the 2010 NU Rock Awards. On October 27, 2010, the Manila Bulletin reported that the station would sign off on November 7, 2010. Musicians and the recording industry "expressed sadness over developments regarding the station."

During the 2010 NU Rock Awards on October 29, Hermosisima announced that it was going to be the last Rock Awards, and that the station will be reformatted and injected with new capital. On the week leading up to the final day, a Facebook page was set up to formally organize the final day of broadcasts. More than a thousand fans responded to the call. Barangay officials in Brgy. San Antonio in Pasig were informed of the matter beforehand.

On Sunday, November 7, speakers were set up outside NU 107's studio where a crowd had gathered carrying candles as a sign of support. The crowd, which included musicians and supporters, stayed at NU 107's studios at Ortigas Center, Pasig. Some of the crowd wrote on a wall their sadness and memories, as well as their wishes for the station and its staff. The final edition of "In the Raw" had rock bands Urbandub and Itchyworms performing live. The disc jockeys openly wept as they thanked the supporters during the station's final hour. Hermosisima was the last person on the microphone with the final words: "This has been NU 107, the Philippines' one and only Home of NU Rock... This is NU 107, we are signing off", with The Eraserheads' "Ang Huling El Bimbo" as the final song of the station. Outside the building, the crowd joined in with the last half of the song, with loud chanting following after the song had finished. NU 107 signed off on November 8, 12:05 a.m, after the usual sign-off notice and the Philippine national anthem "Lupang Hinirang", sung by everyone gathered inside the station and outside the building premises, especially the final line of the anthem, which was sung fortississimo in unison, thus marking the end of NU 107 after 23 years of broadcasting. Footage of this can be found on YouTube as well as on other websites, including commentary and analysis regarding the final day of broadcast.

"Lumapit" by Archipelago was the last song that stayed at the number 1 spot on the NU 107 "Stairway to Seven" charts before the station closed down after 23 years. According to the Philippine Daily Inquirer, the new format had to imitate the format of various 'masa' stations to target listeners at the lower brackets of the socioeconomic scale. The new programming drew in more advertisers compared to the upscale market that NU 107 targeted.

=== 2010–2014: Win Radio ===
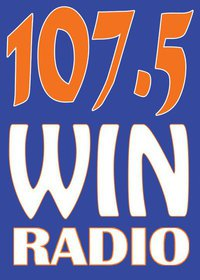
107.5 Win Radio logo (November 8, 2010-June 26, 2014)

On November 9, 2010, the station went back on air with a mass-based format, with the branding unveiled as 107.5 Win Radio the following day.

Managed by ZimZam Management, Inc. of Manny Luzon, who became EVP and COO on October 10, 2010, Win Radio aimed to be a “more decent mainstream frequency” with “responsible programming,” avoiding songs with “double meaning.” Just four months after its launch, it ranked #7 in the March 2011 KBP Radio Research Council survey.

On June 26, 2014, Win Radio ceased broadcasting on 107.5 FM and moved to 91.5 FM two days later, taking over the former 91.5 Big Radio frequency.

=== 2014–present: Wish FM ===
107.5 Wish FM (now Wish 107.5)'s logo (August 10, 2014-October 19, 2014)

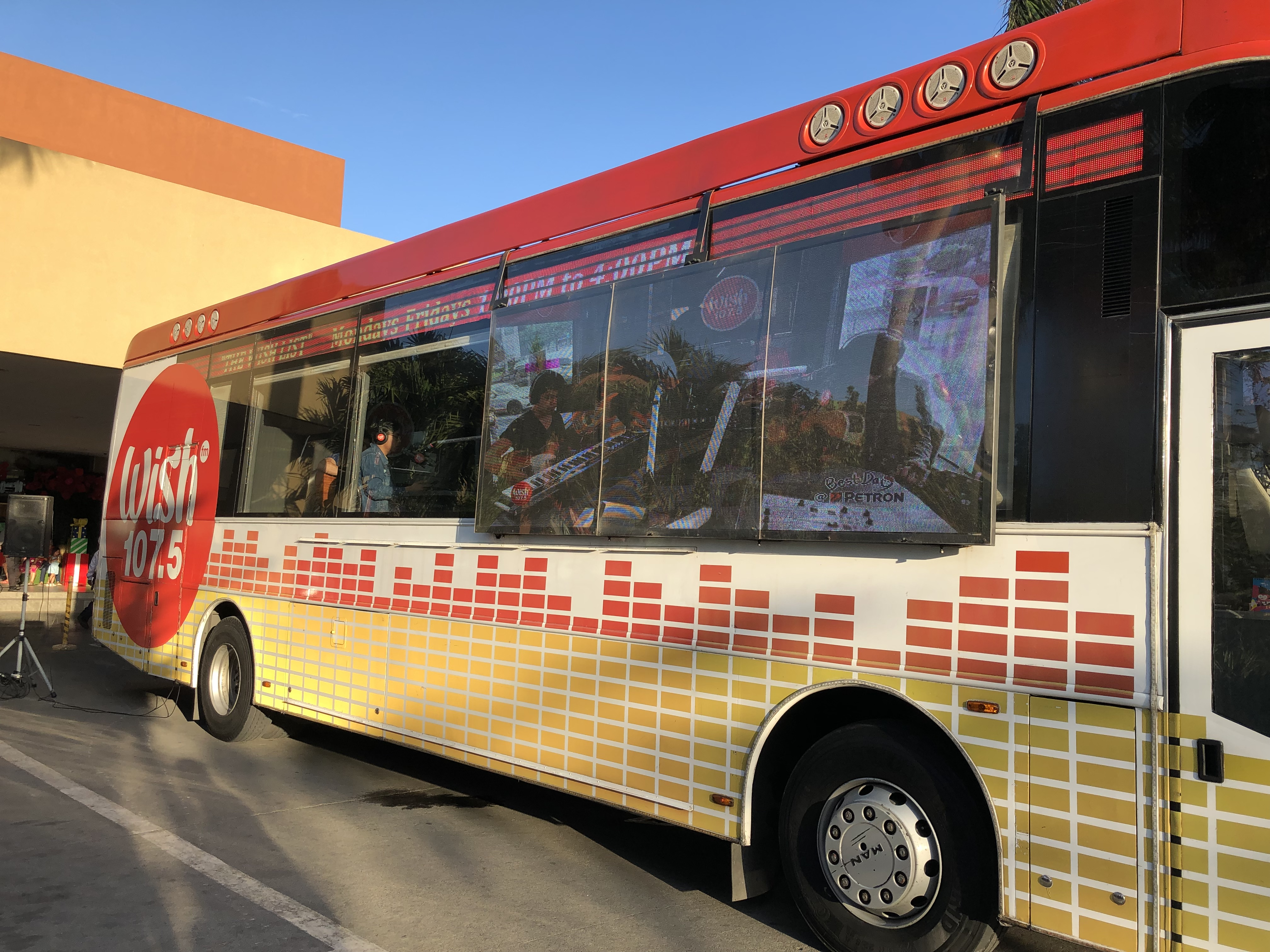
The Wish 107.5 mobile bus outside of CSI Lucao Mall, Dagupan, Pangasinan.

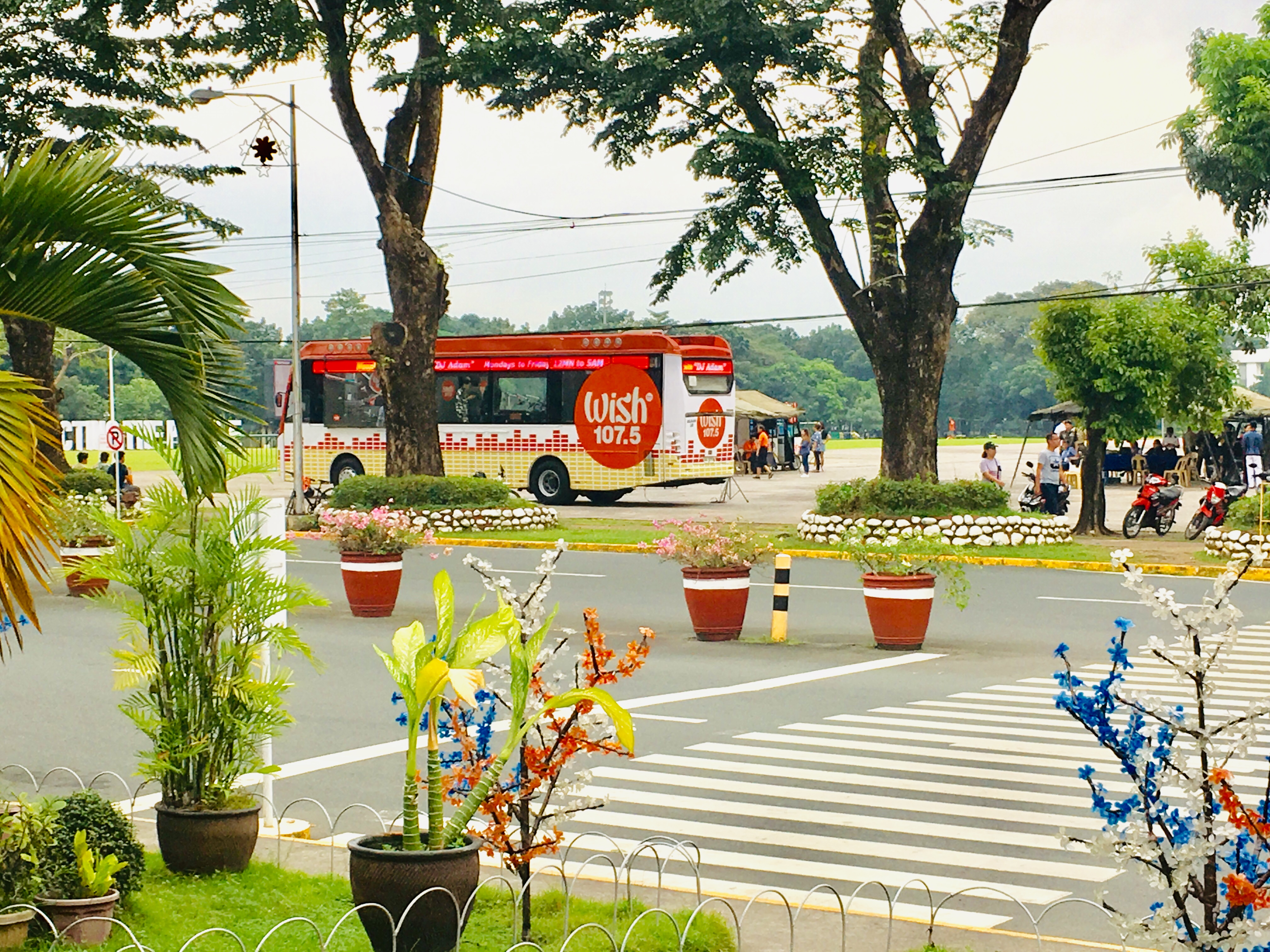
Wish 107.5 bus serenading Camp Aguinaldo, AFP Headquarters

In 2014, Breakthrough and Milestones Productions Incorporated (BMPI), under Chairman and CEO “Kuya” Daniel Razon (aka “Dr. Clark”), assumed management of the 107.5 MHz frequency. The station relocated its studios from Pasig to the UNTV Building in Quezon City and its transmitter facilities moved to the new UNTV transmission tower on Sumulong Highway, Antipolo. This solidified BMPI's influence across PBC's media platforms in Mega Manila, severing ties with the defunct UNTV (“un-tee-vee”) era. Concurrently, the Win Radio brand (under Manny Luzon's management) transferred to 91.5 FM.

The station soft-launched on June 26, 2014, as “107.5,” playing automated music and teasers for its upcoming jingle (sung by Gerald Santos and composed by Mon del Rosario). Its formal launch as 107.5 Wish FM occurred on August 10, 2014, with the “Wish Concert” at the World Trade Center in Pasay, officially signing on at 9:45 PM. On October 20, 2014, it was rebranded as Wish 107.5 (pronounced “one-oh-seven-five”). Willy “Hillbilly Willy” Inong served as station manager from inception until October 11, 2015, when Bryan “T-Bowne” Quitoriano took over.

During its launch, 107.5 Wish FM introduced the “Wish FM Bus,” the first mobile FM radio booth in a bus, a concept inspired by its sister station, Radio La Verdad 1350.

The station's new headquarters, the 16-storey Philippine Broadcast Hub (formerly The Millennial Tower) along EDSA Philam, is currently under construction and will also house UNTV and Radio La Verdad.

By July 2021, after nearly seven years with its new format, Wish FM became the third most listened to FM radio station in Metro Manila.

==== Wishclusive Videos ====
Wish FM's “The Roadshow” broadcasts remotely from the “Wish FM Bus,” featuring local artists performing original songs and covers. Their “Wishclusive” performances, recorded in high-quality audio and HD video, are uploaded to YouTube. Within two years, Wish 107.5's YouTube channel became the top FM radio station channel in the Philippines, the first to surpass 1 million subscribers. As of November 2022, it boasted over 5 billion views and more than 13.6 million subscribers.

On March 28, 2016, Wish 107.5 launched its television program, "Wish 107.5 TV," airing weekdays from 4:30 PM to 5:30 PM PST on UNTV. It was hosted by DJs Jelly Kiss, Faye, Alice, and Princess Leigh. In July 2016, its TV slot was replaced by “Serbisyong Kasangbahay.” By August 2016, DJs Jelly Kiss and Princess Leigh departed Wish 107.5. Singer Aliya Parcs joined as a DJ for “Wishlist,” while “The Roadshow” saw celebrity guest hosts before Robin Nievera took over.

==== Wish 107.5 Music Awards ====
Since 2016, Wish 107.5 has hosted its annual Music Awards, recognizing artists who performed live in the “Wish FM Bus.” This “FM Radio on Wheels” initially traveled Metro Manila and nearby Luzon provinces, later expanding nationwide and even to Los Angeles via Wish USA.

==== Parodies ====
On July 30, 2023, GMA Network's comedy show Bubble Gang parodied Wish 107.5's radio bus as the “Waste Truck.” In the segment, actor-comedian Michael V. performed “Oh Wow!,” a parody of Dilaw's song Uhaw (Tayong Lahat).
