= DWAO-DTV =

UNTV Networks (DWAO-DTV)
- "Dios ang Aming Sandigan, Serbisyo Publiko ang Aming Pinahahalagahan"; We Serve the People, We Give Glory to God
- Metro Manila; Philippines
- City: San Juan
- Channels: Digital: 38 (UHF) (ISDB-T); Virtual: 37.1
- Branding: UNTV Networks 37 Manila

Programming
- Subchannels: See list
- Affiliations: 37.1: UNTV; 37.2: UNTV (mirror feed); 37.3: Truth Channel

Ownership
- Owner: Progressive Broadcasting Corporation
- Operator: Breakthrough and Milestones Productions International
- Sister stations: Radyo La Verdad 1350; Wish 107.5

History
- First air date: January 1, 1999 (as NUTV Channel 37); July 16, 2001/May 2002 (as UNTV-37, NU 107 era); July 2004 (as UNTV 37, Tapatan era); 2007 (as UNTV-37, BMPI era); August 2015 (as UNTV Life); July 18, 2016 (as UNTV News & Rescue/Public Service)
- Former call signs: DWNU-TV (1999−2001); DWAO-TV (2001–2025)
- Former channel numbers: Analog: 37 (UHF, 1999–2025)
- Former affiliations: NUTV (1999−2002)

Technical information
- Licensing authority: NTC
- Power: Digital: 2.5 kW
- Transmitter coordinates: 14°36′29″N 121°9′53″E

Links
- Website: UNTVweb.com

DWAO-DTV (channel 38) is a digital-only television station in Metro Manila, Philippines, serving as the flagship of the UNTV network. The station is owned by the Progressive Broadcasting Corporation of Alfredo "Atom" Henares. Breakthrough and Milestones Productions International, headed by veteran broadcaster Daniel Razon, operate the station through an airtime lease agreement. The station maintains studios at the LVCC Bldg, EDSA, Bagong Barrio, Caloocan City; its hybrid digital transmitter facility is located at UNTV Transmitter Complex, Emerald Hills, Sumulong Highway, Brgy. Santa Cruz, Antipolo, Rizal.

== History ==
On July 16, 2001, the Progressive Broadcasting Corporation (PBC) owned by businessman Alfredo "Atom" Henares ventured into UHF television through UNTV-37 (pronounced as "un-tee-vee"). It serves as television counterpart to PBC's FM radio station NU 107, airing rock and alternative rock music videos. The station gained a cult following through comedy and reality show Strangebrew known as "Ang show na may tama" and "In the Raw."

In 2004, UNTV gradually reduced, until it eventually abandoned airing rock-oriented music videos after its airtime were acquired by Tapatan, Inc. headed by veteran broadcaster Jay Sonza. The station also began airing MCGI religious programs after Henares had a deal with the Ang Dating Daan group. Since then, UNTV became the permanent home of the religious program Ang Dating Daan (The Old Path) after leaving SBN 21. Later, the station was rebranded as "UN Television (UNTV)" (pronounced as "you-en-tee-vee.")

The new UNTV humbly started with a one-room broadcast studio located at the AIC Gold Tower in Ortigas Center, Pasig. The station transferred to Brgy. Damayang Lagi New Manila, Quezon City in 2006 as it needs bigger space for its growing public service initiatives. In 2008, UNTV transferred to its own building at 907 Philam Homes along EDSA Quezon City.

Since then, UNTV became a 24/7 station (however, the network continues to sign-off the air every Monday mornings from 12:05 am to 3:55 am due to regular transmitter maintenance on terrestrial TV only) on free-to-air TV airing news, entertainment and religious programs. In 2007, Breakthrough and Milestones Production International under the leadership of Kuya Daniel Razon acquired the main operations of the network and in turn, relaunched as the "public service channel," another first in the history of Philippine Television.

UNTV began using DJI Phantom aerial drones for their live news reporting in 2013. In 2013, UNTV ceased using its old tower in Crestview Heights Subdivision, Brgy. San Roque, Antipolo, Rizal and began using its new digital-ready transmitter located at Emerald Hills, Sumulong Highway, Antipolo, Rizal to improve signal reception. The tower is shared by UNTV and Wish FM 107.5.

On June 26, 2014, UNTV held the groundbreaking ceremony for the construction of UNTV Broadcast Center, that will serve as its new headquarters. It is located along EDSA, in front of Ayala Land's TriNoma mall and just a few meters away from its current building.

On August 10, 2014, BMPI acquired the operations of PBC's FM station on 107.5 MHz. It was formally launched as 107.5 Wish FM (now Wish 107.5) with a free concert featuring OPM artists at the World Trade Center in Pasay.

On August 26, 2015, UNTV was officially rebranded as UNTV Life, with a new logo, in a concert held at the SM Mall of Asia Arena.

On July 18, 2016, UNTV undergoes a major rebranding to a global news and rescue company and officially became UNTV News and Rescue. The station meanwhile retained its long-time slogan, "Your Public Service Channel". After the refresh, its programs were classified into two programming blocks, UNTV News and Rescue and UNTV Public Service.

On January 1, 2025, UNTV ceased its analog broadcast on UHF Channel 37. However, their plans to flash cut their digital signal into the former analog channel 37 was not materialized yet.

== Digital television ==
=== Digital channels ===
UHF Channel 38 (617.143 MHz)

Channel	Video	Aspect	Short name	Programming	Note
37.01	480i	16:9	UNTV-1	UNTV	Test Broadcast
37.02	1080i	16:9	STV	UNTV mirror feed	Test Broadcast
37.03	1080i	16:9	TRUTH CHANNEL	Truth Channel	Video Library (Test Channel)
37.04	480i	16:9	UNTV Reserve	Unknown	Black Screen
37.31	240p	4:3	UNTV 1SEG	UNTV	1seg

== Areas of coverage ==
=== Primary areas ===
- Metro Manila
- Cavite
- Bulacan
- Laguna

==== Secondary areas ====
- Portion of Rizal
- Portion of Pampanga
- Portion of Nueva Ecija

== Satellite broadcast ==
UNTV can be received via satellite in the Philippines and other countries in Asia, Australia, Middle East, Europe and Africa.

Satellite	Band	Position	Frequency	Polarity	System	SR FEC	Encryption	Coverage
Measat 3A	C Band	91.5° East	3705	Horizontal	DVB-S MPEG-2	4290 3/4	None	Asia, Australia, Middle East, South Eastern Europe and Eastern Africa

== Pay television ==
Pay TV Provider	Type	Ch. #	Coverage
SkyCable	Analog	33	Metro Manila, Rizal, Cavite, Laguna and Bulacan
SkyCable	Digital	58	Metro Manila, Rizal, Cavite, Laguna and Bulacan
Destiny Cable	Analog	9	Metro Manila
Destiny Cable	Digital	58	Metro Manila
Cablelink	Analog & Digital	99	Metro Manila
Cignal	Satellite (Digital)	182	Nationwide
GSat Direct TV	Satellite (Digital)	35	Nationwide
Other cable/satellite providers	N/A	N/A	check with local operators

== Internet streaming ==
UNTV can be received via online streaming through its website, through encoding the network's streaming link URL in the VLC Media Player installed on personal computers and mobile devices, and through the 24/7 YouTube livestream.

== Mobile application ==
In 2013, BMPI launched the UNTV Mobile App for Apple iOS, Google Android and Windows mobile and tablet devices. By downloading the mobile application, users with stable internet connection will be able to watch the broadcast feed of UNTV News and Rescue and listen to UNTV Radio La Verdad 1350 kHz for free.

Application	Platform
UNTV Mobile App	Apple iOS
UNTV Mobile App	Google Android
UNTV Mobile App	Microsoft Windows Mobile
