= Asian Institute for Distance Education =

Private college in Makati, Philippines

- Type: Private distance learning college
- Established: 1984
- Dean: Antonio O. Cojuangco, M.B.A.
- Location: Greenbelt Mansion, Perea St., Makati, Philippines; 14°33′17″N 121°01′14″E
- Website: aidefoun.info.com.ph
- Location in Metro Manila Location in Luzon Location in the Philippines

Asian Institute for Distance Education (AIDE) is a distance learning college accredited by the Commission on Higher Education (CHED), the government agency regulating all universities and colleges in the Philippines.

AIDE is a private, non-sectarian, higher education institution offering programs leading to baccalaureate degrees via a mixed mode of instruction, largely dependent on self-instructional module packages.

== Academics ==
AIDE courses are offered in printed modules which can be picked up or sent by mail to students. Each package includes lessons, open-book exams, and assignments. All modules are reviewed and updated by in-house academic staff who are experts in their fields.

The open-book exams and assignments are submitted to the AIDE Office for academic evaluation and grading. Upon submission of all required exams and homework, the student is required to be physically present to take his proctored final examination inside the school premises. Grades are then computed on the basis of final examinations and other submitted requirements. The grading system follows the CHED standard, which requires a passing grade of 75% or higher for every academic course.

Once a student passes all requirements, including final exams, for all academic courses required in a degree program, a CHED-recognized diploma and transcript of records can be awarded.

== Organization and administration ==
Established and fully operational since 1984, AIDE is the oldest existing college of its kind in the Philippines. It is also one of only four government recognized distance learning providers offering full academic degrees.

AIDE is headed by its incumbent president and chief executive officer, Antonio O. Cojuangco, who previously served as president of Associated Broadcasting Company (ABC) and Philippine Long Distance Telephone Company (PLDT). He holds degrees in business from Ateneo de Manila University and Stanford University.

AIDE has attended conferences of the Asian Association of Open Universities, an international academic group based in China Central Radio and TV University in Beijing, China.

== Notable alumni ==
- Mico Aytona - actor, singer and dancer
- Ayra Mariano – actress, singer, dancer, host and commercial model
- Enzo Pineda – actor
- Toni Gonzaga – singer, television host, producer and actress
