= La Verdad Christian College =

Private Christian college in Pampanga, Philippines

- Motto in English: Wisdom based on the Truth is priceless
- Type: private non-stock
- Established: 1998 (became College on March 3, 2005)
- Religious affiliation: Members Church of God International
- Chairman: Eli Soriano
- President: Daniel Razon
- Location: Apalit, Pampanga, Philippines; 14°57′32″N 120°45′31″E
- Campus: 2 campuses in Philippines 1 campus in Ghana 1 campus in Liberia
- Nickname: La Verdarians
- Website: app.laverdad.edu.ph
- Location in Luzon Location in the Philippines

The La Verdad Christian College or LVCC is a private educational institution established in Apalit, Pampanga, Philippines. It is the first private school in the Philippines that grants scholarship programs to deserving students by providing tuition-free education and no miscellaneous fees. It is one of the best schools in Pampanga, up to regional and national levels.

== History ==
La Verdad Christian College was established in 1998 by its founding chairman Eli Soriano. Currently, Dr. Daniel Razon serves as the president.

It offers pre-school, elementary and high school to its students since 1998 then college was started in 2005 offering its initial six technical courses. In 2010, the college established its first branch in Caloocan which eventually becomes the main branch of the institution. The year 2011 pave its way to establish its foreign campuses in Ghana and Liberia countries both in Africa.

At present, La Verdad Christian College holds the title as the only educational institution that provides free uniforms, instructional materials and meals since 2009 as part of its full-grant scholarship program to deserving students.

A Song Of Praise Music Festival tapes its weekly and monthly finals episodes at La Verdad Christian College auditorium in Caloocan campus.

== Bible School ==
Aside from academics, La Verdad Christian College also has its curriculum-based Bible School for Kids (KNC Bible School). It strives to nurture children about the Christian way of living through Bible story readings, biblical topic lessons, Bible-centered competitions, and talent searches. Its programs and activities that are Bible-based that teach moral values, Christian morality, good manners and right conduct, and many others. The KNC Show, its television program being aired daily on UNTV which is the only bible-based kiddie show on Philippine television to date.

== Campus ==
- Apalit, Pampanga
- Caloocan, Metro Manila

== Awards ==
In 2017, one of its students, Carlo Canlas entered into the competition organized by Cinema One dubbed as Cinema One Originals Festival 2017. Canlas won the said competition besting nine other universities.

In 2018, three of its students joined the competition in the Southeast Asia Video Festival for Children held on November 24. The competition was represented by ten countries in Southeast Asia including the Philippines. La Verdad Christian College won the two categories-the Children's Juror Award Amateur Level and the Professional Non-Fiction Category Amateur Level.
