= G Diaries =

- Also known as: G Diaries: Quest for Love (season 3); G Diaries: Share the Love (season 4); G Diaries: Change the World 2gether (season 8); G Diaries: Stronger 2gether (season 9)
- Genre: Travel; Lifestyle
- Directed by: Hanz Florentino
- Presented by: Ernie Lopez; Michelle Lopez
- Country of origin: Philippines
- Original languages: Filipino; English
- No. of seasons: 9

Production
- Executive producer: Marivic R. Trinidad
- Camera setup: Multiple-camera setup
- Running time: 120 minutes (seasons 1–2); 30 minutes (season 3–present)
- Production company: ABS-CBN Foundation

Original release
- Network: ABS-CBN
- Release: June 10, 2017 – May 3, 2020
- Network: Kapamilya Channel
- Release: June 14, 2020 – June 30, 2024

G Diaries is a Philippine television travel documentary show broadcast by ABS-CBN and Kapamilya Channel. Originally hosted by Gina Lopez, it aired as a special programming from June 10 to September 2, 2017 and was replaced by Dok Ricky, Pedia. The show returned as a special programming from February 11 to December 15, 2018 and later as a regular programming from March 10, 2019 to June 30, 2024. Ernie Lopez and Michelle Lopez served as the final hosts. It features destinations throughout the Philippines for an effort to support ecotourism.

The program stopped broadcasting on ABS-CBN after the network ceased its free-to-air broadcast operations as ordered by the National Telecommunications Commission (NTC) and Solicitor General Jose Calida.

== Host ==
- Gina Lopez (2017–2019)
- Ernie Lopez (2019–2022)
- Michelle Lopez (2021–2022)

== Accolades ==
Year	Award	Category	Recipient	Result	Ref.
2018	32nd PMPC Star Awards for Television	Best Travel Show	G Diaries	Won	
2018	32nd PMPC Star Awards for Television	Best Travel Show Host	Gina Lopez	Won	
2019	33rd PMPC Star Awards for Television	Best Travel Show	G Diaries	Won	
2019	33rd PMPC Star Awards for Television	Best Travel Show Host	Gina Lopez	Nominated	
