= Bossing & Ai =

Philippine television game show

- Title card
- Genre: Variety show; Game show; Gag show
- Directed by: Bibeth Orteza
- Presented by: Vic Sotto; Ai-Ai delas Alas
- Opening theme: "Bossing & Ai" theme song
- Country of origin: Philippines
- Original language: Tagalog
- No. of episodes: 19

Production
- Producer: Vic Sotto
- Production locations: APT Entertainment Studio, Cainta, Rizal, Philippines
- Camera setup: Multiple-camera setup
- Running time: 60 minutes
- Production companies: GMA Entertainment TV; M–Zet TV Production

Original release
- Network: GMA Network
- Release: September 24, 2017 – February 4, 2018

Bossing & Ai is a Philippine television comedy game show broadcast by GMA Network. Hosted by Vic Sotto and Ai-Ai delas Alas, it premiered on September 24, 2017 on the network's Sunday Grande sa Gabi line up. The show concluded on February 4, 2018, with a total of 19 episodes.

== Hosts ==
Hosts

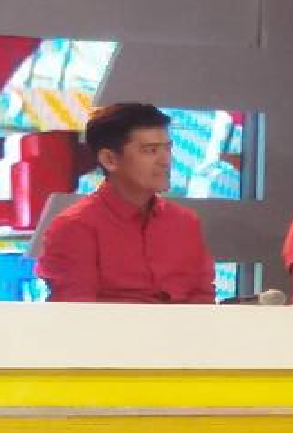
Vic Sotto

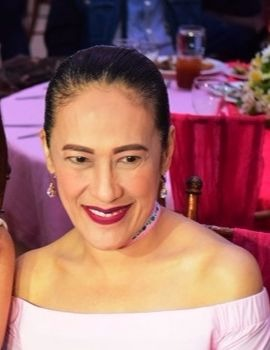
Ai-Ai delas Alas

- Vic Sotto
- Ai-Ai delas Alas

Co-hosts

- Boobsie Wonderland
- Jelson Bay

Guests

- Jose Manalo
- Oyo Boy Sotto
- Tart Carlos
- Ciara Sotto
- Pauleen Luna
- Kristine Hermosa
- Philip Lazaro

== Ratings ==
According to AGB Nielsen Philippines' Nationwide Urban Television Audience Measurement People in television homes, the pilot episode of Bossing & Ai earned a 4.6% rating. The final episode scored a 4% rating.

== Accolades ==
Accolades received by Bossing & Ai
Year	Award	Category	Recipient	Result	Ref.
2018	32nd PMPC Star Awards for Television	Best Variety Show	Bossing & Ai	Nominated	
