= Good Morning Kuya =

Philippine morning news-talk TV program

- Title card since 2022
- Also known as: GMK
- Genre: News, morning talk show
- Created by: Progressive Broadcasting Corporation
- Developed by: UNTV News and Rescue
- Presented by: Daniel Razon; Joshua Dionisio; Ayra Mariano; Ian Miranda; Tini Balanon; Celine Ang
- Opening theme: "Good Morning Kuya"
- Composer: Krist Melecio
- Country of origin: Philippines
- Original language: Filipino

Production
- Executive producer: Daniel Razon
- Production locations: UNTV Studio, LVCC Building, Bagong Barrio, EDSA, Caloocan
- Camera setup: Multicamera setup
- Running time: 2 hours and 30 minutes (2013–15, 2020–24, 2026–present); 2 hours (2010–13); 3 hours (2007–10, 2015–20); 3 hours and 30 minutes (2024–26); 1 hour and 30 minutes (2026)
- Production company: Breakthrough and Milestones Productions International

Original release
- Network: UNTV (2007–present); STV (2018–20)
- Release: July 23, 2007 – present

Related
- Pilipinas, Gising Ka Na Ba?

Good Morning Kuya (English: Good Morning Brother), also known as GMK, is a Philippine television news broadcasting and talk show broadcast by UNTV. Originally hosted by Daniel Razon, it premiered on July 23, 2007, replacing Pilipinas, Gising Ka Na Ba?. Razon, Ayra Mariano, Joshua Dionisio, Ian Miranda, Tini Balanon and Celine Ang currently serve as the hosts. The show also provides various public services by means of a free clinic, a free orphanage, free education, a free transient home, free legal services and free rides during weekday mornings. Look-alikes of Manny Pacquiao (a.k.a. Manny Pangyaw) and Mr. Bean (a.k.a. Mr. Bin) gives an added twist in the show. The show can be viewed from 5:00 am to 7:30 am. In 2015, it extended again back to 3 hours from 5:00 am to 8:00 am. On October 21, 2024, the program is extended to 3 hours and 30 minutes from 5:00 am to 8:30 am PST. On August 3, 2026, The program now airs from 6:30 am to 9:00 am PST.

== Hosts ==
- Daniel Razon
- Ayra Mariano
- Joshua Dionisio
- Ian Miranda
- Tini Balanon
- Celine Ang

=== Segment hosts ===
- Leslie Longboen
- Rey Pelayo
- Atty. Joeie Domingo

=== Former hosts ===
- Monica Verallo-Tantoco
- Atty. Regie Tongol
- Allan Encarnacion
- Eloisa "Lola Selah" Cruz Canlas
- Ka Tony Arevalo
- Robbie Packing
- Bryan "Wonder Boy" Evangelista
- Carls Teng
- "Datgirl" Piamonte
- Dave Tirao
- Krist Melecio
- Lyn Perez
- Wanlu
- Ryan Ramos
- Rodel Flordeliz
- Lea Ylagan
- Nina Taduran
- Jun Soriao
- Nicanor "Nick the Barber" Gatmaytan
- Ponce dela Paz
- Lorenzo "Erin" Tañada III
- Rey Pelayo
- Ninang Riza Muyot
- Ka Rene Jose
- Chris "Porky" dela Cruz
- Minyong
- Manny Pangyaw
- Diego Castro III
- Angela Lagunzad
- Erica "Kikay" Honrado
- Beth Santiago
- Rheena Villamor-Camara
- Kath Dumaraos
- Nel Maribojoc
- Dr. Janis Ann Espino-De Vera
- Dr. Joseph Lee
- Dr. Bong Santiago
- Dr. Sarah Barba-Cabodil

== Segments ==
- Serbisyong MCGI –A core segment highlighting the charitable efforts of the Members of the Church of God International (MCGI). The program provides free medical, dental, and optical services to the public, regardless of their background or affiliation
- Advisories –public service announcement
- Cook Eat Right –demonstration of cooking special recipes inherited from previous generations
- Weather and Traffic Update (formerly GMK News) –news segment for latest weather and traffic situation reports
- Usapang Pangkalusugan –Health Information
- Now You Know –health and information tips
- Easy Lang 'yan –life hacks and home management tips

== Awards ==
In 2009, the show was awarded as one of the Best Philippine Morning Shows in the 23rd Star Awards for Television (Philippines). Its hosts were also nominated in the Star awards as Best Morning Show Hosts for Philippine Television.

In 2018, Good Morning Kuya was awarded an Anak TV Seal for being a family-friendly program, alongside other UNTV shows.

Year	Association	Category	Nominee(s)	Result
2009	AnakTV	AnakTV Seal Award	Good Morning Kuya	Awarded
2010	AnakTV	AnakTV Seal Award	Good Morning Kuya	Awarded
2014	AnakTV	AnakTV Seal Award	Good Morning Kuya	Awarded
2016	AnakTV	AnakTV Seal Award	Good Morning Kuya	Awarded
2017	AnakTV	AnakTV Seal Award	Good Morning Kuya	Awarded
2018	AnakTV	AnakTV Seal Award	Good Morning Kuya	Awarded
2021	34th PMPC Star Awards for Television	Best Morning Show Hosts	Good Morning Kuya	Awarded
