= DZXQ =

Radio station in Metro Manila, Philippines

Radyo La Verdad (DZXQ)
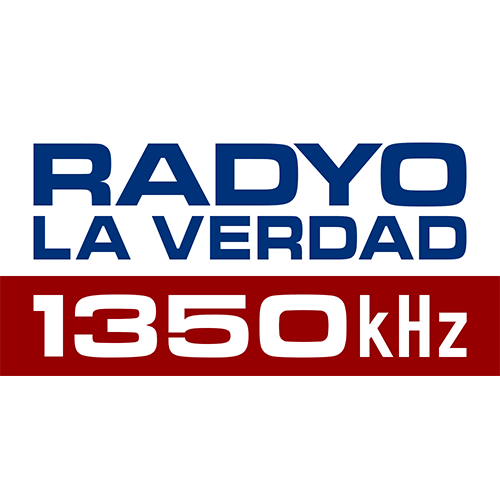
- Caloocan; Philippines
- Broadcast area: Mega Manila and surrounding areas
- Frequency: 1350 kHz
- Branding: Radyo La Verdad 1350

Programming
- Language: Filipino
- Format: News, Public Affairs, Talk, Religious Radio
- Affiliations: UNTV

Ownership
- Owner: Information Broadcast Unlimited
- Operator: Breakthrough and Milestones Productions International
- Sister stations: Through BMPI: DWAO-DTV (UNTV); Wish 1075

History
- First air date: July 1, 1973 (as DZXQ); January 16, 2012 (as UNTV Radio)
- Former call signs: DZXQ (1972–2011)
- Former frequencies: 1260 kHz (1972–1978)
- Call sign meaning: None; sequentially assigned

Technical information
- Licensing authority: NTC
- Power: 10,000 watts

Links
- Webcast: Listen live
- Website: www.radyolaverdad.com

DZXQ (1350 AM), on-air as Radyo La Verdad 1350, is a radio station owned by Information Broadcast Unlimited and operated by Breakthrough and Milestones Productions International. Its studio and offices are located in EDSA, Caloocan while its transmitter is located along Kagitingan St., Brgy. Muzon, Malabon.

== History ==
=== 1973-2011: DZXQ ===
The station was established in 1973 under the ownership of Mabuhay Broadcasting System. During the martial law era, DZXQ was as a music station, competing with top-rater DWBL. Notable personalities of the station were Divine Pascual and Bobby Ante.

In 1986, DZXQ reformatted into a talk station, offering brokered programming, and carried the slogan “Kaibigan ng Masa” (friend of the masses). In the early 1990s, it moved to The Centerpoint Building in Ortigas Center, Pasig. Since then, it was the home of the Powerhouse Broadcasters such as Nar Pineda, Roger Arienda (who was once one of the anchors of DZMM), Rolly Canon, Narissa Gonzalez, Ducky Paredes, Jhino Parrucho, Ruben Ilagan, Popo Villanueva, Roland Lumagbas, Dr. Erick San Juan, Reggie Vizmanos and Roy Señeres. It was also the home of "An Affair with Baby Tsina", a lifestyle radio show. It aired Chinese programs every 9:00 pm to midnight.

On March 6, 2011, DZXQ went off the air a few days after it was acquired by a new set of investors, whose immediate plan was to close only for six months. The affected broadcasters were informed that the station had been sold. Nar Pineda and the Powerhouse Broadcasters were forced to move to DWSS, while some moved to DWBL.

=== 2011-present: UNTV Radio ===
Former logo

It was later found out that these new investors were related to Information Broadcast Unlimited and UNTV. Breakthrough and Milestones Productions International took over the station's operations. In November 2011, the station returned on air as a simulcast of UNTV. Other timeslots were mostly filled by religious content provided by Ang Dating Daan. It also moved to its current home in UNTV Building in Quezon City.

On January 16, 2012, the station was formally launched as UNTV Radio La Verdad (Spanish word for "the truth radio"). Its mission is to bring back the glory of radio, from the current trend which is radio sans images or “Radio on TV” (TeleRadyo). UNTV Radio also introduced a mobile radio booth, a first in Philippine Radio history, where it broadcasts from a specific location via see thru mobile studio vehicle.

In 2017, UNTV Radio was rebranded to Radyo La Verdad with a new logo and slogan “Totoong Balita, Tunay na Kalinga Para sa Kapwa” (“Real News, Real Care for Others”). At that same year, it upgraded its transmitter facilities, which includes its transmitter house and a concrete catwalk, and replaced its four-decade old 10-kW analog tube-type transmitter with its brand new 50 kW solid-state radio transmitter (10 kW operational)

In 2016, UNTV Radio conducted its first Student Reporters' Convention held in Apalit, Pampanga. Currently, the radio station has Student Reporters across the country and abroad known as "La Verdad Correspondents".

== Notable on-air personalities ==
=== Current ===
- Daniel Razon
- Bro. Eli Soriano†

=== Former ===
- Manolo Favis†

== See also ==
- UNTV News & Rescue
- Ang Dating Daan
