= KNC Show =

- Title card since June 7, 2026
- Genre: Children's television series Educational
- Created by: Progressive Broadcasting Corporation
- Developed by: Broadcast Ministry of Members Church of God International
- Directed by: Rennie Aloc; Kurt Barillo (2026–present)
- Starring: Ate Hannah
- Theme music composer: Bong Rueda
- Composer: Bong Rueda
- Country of origin: Philippines
- Original languages: Filipino; English

Production
- Executive producers: Wens Lazaro; Bianca Santiago (2026–present)
- Running time: Sundays 10:00–10:30 AM (UTC+8)
- Production company: Breakthrough and Milestones Productions International

Original release
- Network: UNTV
- Release: July 16, 2004 – February 22, 2026
- Release: June 7, 2026 – present

KNC Show (English: Flock of Lamb) is a Philippine television educational show broadcast by UNTV. Originally hosted by Eric Cabobos, Johanne Velasco, Jan Arbes, Receli Reñosa, Jhavelle Punzalan, Oliver Malig, Awee Anilla, Avin Gapuz and Jax Marie Taguz, it premiered on July 16, 2004. The show temporarily had a season break from March 1 to May 31, 2026. The show resumed on June 7, 2026. Ate Hannah currently served as the host.

== Hosts ==
=== Main host ===
- Ate Hannah

=== Former hosts ===
- Eric Cabobos (2004–2026)
- Johanne Velasco
- Jan Arbes
- Receli Reñosa
- Jhavelle Punzalan
- Oliver Malig
- Awee Anilla
- Avin Gapuz
- Jax Marie Taguz
- Moonlight Alarcon
- Tim Argallon
- Angelica Tejana
- Kyla Manarang
- Christian Luke Alarcon
- Percida Capulong
- Kimberly Enriquez
- Christian Daniel Isip
- MJ Paler
- Angelica Tejana
- Bency Braine Vallo
- Liana Manalanzan
- Elisha Manalanzan
- Queenzy Villanueva
- EK Navales
- Kenchie Diaz
- Julia Oyong
- Merrielle Lagrimas
- Boo Andres
- Zyrus Juan
- Jof Garcia
- Roadblock Andres
- Xyum Diaz
- David Soriano
- Zach Salomo
- Clark Elias Carumba
- Juliana de Leon

== Broadcast ==
- KNC Show aired every Sunday at 11 am. Formerly aired on July 16, 2004, every Friday at 4 pm and Sunday at 11:30 am, later moved to Weekdays at 10:30 am (later axed the morning slot in 2006) and 4 pm also on weekends but axed the timeslot on July 22, 2007, but moved the weekday timeslot to 5 pm on July 23, 2007, and returned to 4 pm in 2008, later moved to 3:45 pm in 2014 and back at 4 pm in 2015 for weekdays until April 3, 2020, later added weekend run at 8 am in 2013, moved to 9 am slot on December 5, 2020, and axed the Saturday timeslot on August 10, 2024, and on from October 13 to December 15, 2024, the Sunday timeslot aired at 9:30 am. On July 18, 2016, until 2020, it returned to the morning timeslot at 8 am.

== Awards ==
- 2008, Best Children Show at the 22nd PMPC Star Awards for Television
- 2011, Awardee at the 25th PMPC Star Awards for Television and Finalist in the Golden Screen TV Awards’ Outstanding Educational Program
- 2012, Finalist in Quality in Children's Television Worldwide Award and Tunay na Programang Pambata sa Telebisyon Awardee by the Department of Education (National Council for Children's Television)
- 2013, Best Educational Program Finalist in the Gandingan Awards (7th UPLB Isko’t Iska's Choice Awards)
- 2014, Best TV Children's Program by the Golden Dove Awards
- 2015, Best Children Show at the 29th PMPC Star Awards for Television

Year	Association	Category	Nominee(s)	Result
2010	AnakTV	AnakTV Seal Award	KNC Show	Awarded
2011	AnakTV	AnakTV Seal Award	KNC Show	Awarded
2012	AnakTV	AnakTV Seal Award	KNC Show	Awarded
2013	AnakTV	AnakTV Seal Award	KNC Show	Awarded
2014	AnakTV	AnakTV Seal Award	KNC Show	Awarded
2015	AnakTV	AnakTV Seal Award	KNC Show	Awarded
2016	AnakTV	AnakTV Seal Award	KNC Show	Awarded
2017	AnakTV	AnakTV Seal Award	KNC Show	Awarded
2018	AnakTV	AnakTV Seal Award	KNC Show	Awarded
