= Breakthrough and Milestones Productions International =

Breakthrough and Milestones Productions International Inc.
- Company type: Parent
- Traded as: UNTV-BMPI; Wish-BMPI
- Industry: Media company
- Founded: July 2004
- Founder: Daniel Razon
- Headquarters: 351 EDSA, Bagong Barrio, Caloocan City, Philippines
- Area served: Worldwide
- Key people: Daniel Razon (President and CEO); Jay Eusebio (General Manager)
- Products: UNTV; Radio La Verdad 1350; Wish FM 107.5
- Services: Radio and Television Production, publishing, news, websites, movie production, talent management and development
- Subsidiaries: None
- Website: bmpicorp.com

Breakthrough and Milestones Productions International Inc. (abbreviated as BMPI) is a Filipino-owned media company, providing services for radio, television, motion picture, print, publications, Internet broadcasting, audio recording, photography, and talent management since 2004.

== Background ==
BMPI's principal activities include TV production and media network management, events management, advertising, and marketing. BMPI is the current marketing firm and content provider of Progressive Broadcasting Corporation's television and radio stations, including UNTV News and Rescue, and Wish 107.5 in Mega Manila and Cebu. It also manages the programming and content of Radyo La Verdad 1350 (UNTV Radio). BMPI also established its talent development center, known as BMPI Talent Center, in 2018.

The company's chairman and CEO is veteran broadcaster Daniel S. Razon.

== Filmography ==
- Isang Araw Lang
- Isang Araw: Ikalawang Yugto
- Isang Araw: Ikatlong Yugto

== See also ==
- Progressive Broadcasting Corporation
