= UNTV =

Television network in the Philippines

- Logo used since 2016
- Type: Broadcast television network
- Country: Philippines
- Stations: List of TV stations
- Headquarters: La Verdad Christian College Building, 351 EDSA, Brgy. Bagong Barrio West, Caloocan

Programming
- Languages: Filipino (main); English (secondary)
- Picture format: 16:9 480i SDTV; 720p/1080p HDTV

Ownership
- Owner: Progressive Broadcasting Corporation
- Key people: Alfredo "Atom" L. Henares (Chairman, President of PBC); Daniel S. Razon (Chairman, CEO of BMPI); Jay Eusebio (Vice President for TV, UNTV-BMPI)
- Sister channels: Truth Channel

History
- Founded: January 1, 1999; 27 years ago (as NUTV); July 16, 2001; 25 years ago (as UNTV)
- Launched: July 16, 2001; 25 years ago
- Founder: Hilarion "Larry" Henares Jr. Alfredo L. Henares
- Former names: NUTV (1999–2001); UNTV Life (2015–2016)

Links
- Website: untvnews.com

Availability

Terrestrial
- Digital terrestrial television: Channel 38 (Metro Manila)
- SkyCable Metro Manila: Channel 58
- Converge Vision / SkyTV Metro Manila: Channel 37
- Sky Direct Nationwide: Channel 10
- Cignal TV Nationwide: Channel 182
- SatLite Nationwide: Channel 101
- G Sat Nationwide: Channel 41

UNTV (Note: /juːˌɛntiːˈviː/ YOU-EN-tee-vee; formerly /ʌntiːˈviː/ UHN-tee-vee) (currently known as UNTV Networks) is the flagship Philippine television network of the Progressive Broadcasting Corporation (known on air as UNTV-PBC), together with Breakthrough and Milestones Productions International (known on air as UNTV-BMPI), the network's content provider and marketing arm, and Christian religious organization Members Church of God International (MCGI), its major blocktimer. DWAO-DTV is one of the few NTSC-System M stations in the world that broadcast on Ultra High Frequency (UHF) Channel 37. In 2019, UNTV transferred its studios from the old UNTV Building at 907 EDSA Quezon City to its temporary studios in La Verdad Christian College Building, 351 EDSA, Brgy. Bagong Barrio West, Caloocan. UNTV transmitter is located at Emerald Hills, Sumulong Highway in Antipolo, Rizal. The sixteen-storey UNTV Broadcast Center, also referred to as The Millennial Tower and now called The Philippine Broadcast Hub along EDSA Philam is currently under construction to serve as its new headquarters.

UNTV is known for its broadcast of Ang Dating Daan (The Old Path), the longest-running religious program in the Philippines, hosted by radio and televangelist Bro. Eli Soriano of the Members Church of God International (MCGI).

UNTV's public service programs and free services are manned by BMPI chairman and CEO, Daniel Razon. Razon is also known as the co-host of Ang Dating Daan and MCGI's Overall Servant.

== Network profile ==
=== PBC Blocktime ===
UNTV Manila and Cebu were part of a blocktime programming agreement between Progressive Broadcasting Corporation (PBC) majority owned by Alfredo "Atom" Henares and Breakthrough and Milestones Productions International Inc. led by Daniel Razon. BMPI is the broadcast arm of Members Church of God International (MCGI) in the Philippines.

Assigned to PBC is the broadcast license, the radio frequency spectrum (UHF) necessary for broadcasting in key populated areas. The owners entrusted Razon with the network's programming and marketing through BMPI.

UNTV is referred to as "The Kasangbahay Network", a Filipino word which means "household", a group of people, often a family, who live together. It was introduced in 2007.

== History ==
=== Original network, 2001 to 2004 ===
In July 2001, the Progressive Broadcasting Corporation (PBC) owned by businessman Alfredo "Atom" Henares ventured into UHF television through UNTV 37, which initially branded as NUTV Channel 37. After almost a year of test broadcast, UNTV (pronounced as "un-TV", implying "the opposite of TV") was launched in May 2002 as a television counterpart to PBC's FM radio station NU 107 (DWNU 107.5 FM), airing rock and alternative rock music videos. NU 107 was a brainchild of Henares and radio veteran Mike N. Pedero. It carved a niche in the radio broadcast history as one of the first alternative radio stations that played artists who break new ground in music. In its early years on television, UNTV gained a cult following through comedy and reality show Strangebrew. The channel also aired the TV version of the iconic NU107 radio show "In the Raw"; as well as clips from the previous editions of the now-defunct NU Rock Awards; and NU 107 events such as Summer Shebang, NU 107 Pocket Concerts, and Party Monsters on the Loose.

=== Overhauled network, 2004 to present ===
In 2004, UNTV gradually reduced and eventually ceased airing rock music videos (The rock-oriented programming format would later be picked up in 2019 through RJ DigiTV's digital subchannel Rock MNL, formerly known as Rock of Manila TV and RJ Rock TV, owned by the Rajah Broadcasting Network) after its blocktime slots were acquired by Tapatan, Inc., a multimedia and consultancy firm headed by veteran broadcaster Jay Sonza as chairman and CEO. Later, news and public affairs programs were introduced and Sonza became its station manager.

Henares also had a deal with MCGI for religious programming at night since 2003. Since then, UNTV started airing and eventually became the permanent home of the religious program Ang Dating Daan (The Old Path) after leaving GemCom Holdings-owned UHF TV network SBN 21 (later sold to Solar Entertainment Corporation in 2010 for Php 368.8 million).

Later, the station was re-branded as "UN Television (UNTV)" (the letters were spelled out, and did not appear to have any meaning). The relaunch aims to introduce the station to a larger demographic range of audience. It comes with a new Station ID, own website, and new tagline "In Service to Humanity. Worldwide."

UNTV started from scratch with a one-room broadcast studio located at the AIC Gold Tower in Ortigas Center, Pasig. 2004 marks UNTV's entry into satellite broadcasting using Agila 2 satellite then moved to ABS 5/ABS 3 satellite in late 2011, and later moved to Measat 3A satellite; as well as the start of its 24-hour broadcast through its official website.

In November 2005, UNTV became a household name as one of its cameraman captured an exclusive four-minute raw footage of a shooting incident in front of its studio in Ortigas, and was then aired on TV Patrol World, the top-rated primetime newscast of ABS-CBN.

As it needs a larger space for its growing public service initiatives, the station transferred to Brgy. Damayang Lagi New Manila, Quezon City in 2006 and later to its own building at 907 Philam Homes along EDSA Quezon City on July 21, 2008 (until 2019).

==== BMPI era (2007 to present) ====
Since the takeover in 2004, UNTV became a 24-hour free TV network (though it continues to sign-off on free TV every Monday mornings for regular transmitter maintenance; however, programming continues online, pay TV and satellite) broadcasting not only religious programs of ADD, but also news and current affairs, public service, informative and entertainment programs. In 2007, UNTV was relaunched as a public service channel, a first in Philippine TV history.

In 2013, UNTV ceased using its old analog transmitter tower in Crestview Heights Subdivision, San Roque, Antipolo, Rizal (which is now acquired by Radio Philippines Network and Nine Media Corporation for digital TV broadcasts purposes), and began using its newly constructed tower located near Emerald Hills on Sumulong Highway, Antipolo, Rizal for a clearer and better signal reception and used to broadcast UNTV both in both analog and digital and radio station Wish 107.5.

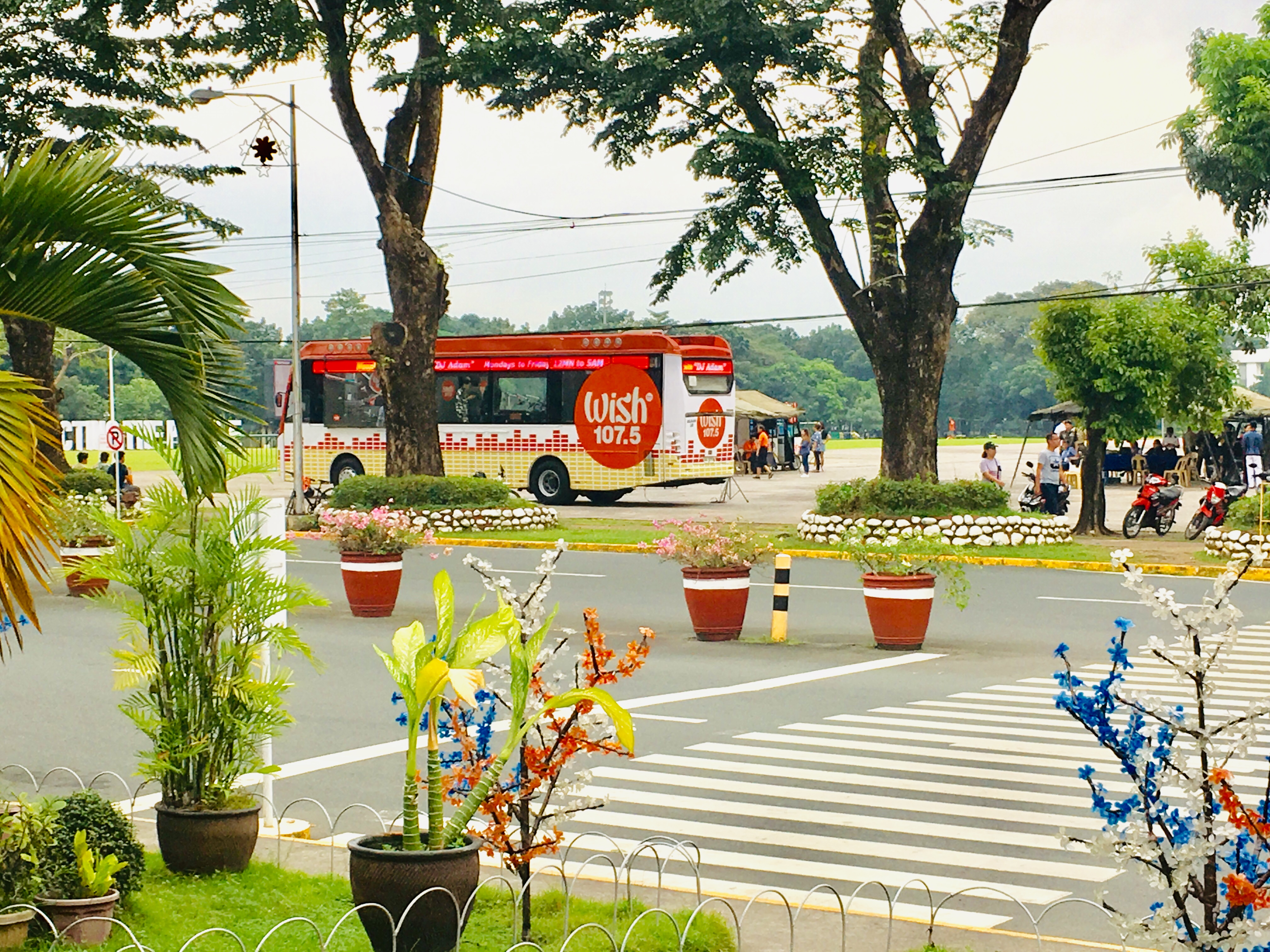
Wish 107.5 bus serenading Camp Aguinaldo, AFP Headquarters

From June 25 to 26, 2014, the network marked its tenth anniversary in the broadcast industry with a two-day UNTV Elderpowerment Expo and UNTV Rescue Summit held at the Philippine Trade Training Center (PTTC) and World Trade Center (WTC) both in Pasay; as well as the soft-relaunching of DWNU under management of UNTV-BMPI. On its last day, UNTV held the groundbreaking ceremony for the construction of UNTV Broadcast Center, a 16-storey building that will serve as its new headquarters strategically located along EDSA, in front of Ayala Land's Vertis North project and TriNoma mall, just a few meters away from its headquarters for more than a decade, the old UNTV building, the lot formerly occupied by Kamanggagawa Foundation's Transient Home.

On August 10, 2014, UNTV-BMPI formally relaunched DWNU 107.5 as 107.5 Wish FM with a free concert featuring OPM singers at the WTC and UNTV's newest station jingle entitled "Maaasahan Mo" sung by Shane Velasco and Beverly Caimen.

===== UNTV Life (2015 to 2016) =====
From August 25 to 26, 2015, as part of UNTV's 11th anniversary celebration, a two-day event was held including the opening of the basketball league of Philippine government agencies, the UNTV Cup Season 4 at the SM Mall of Asia Arena, Public Service Expo and the second UNTV Rescue Summit at the SMX Convention Center. On August 26, the unveiling of the new UNTV was held at the MOA Arena and it was officially rebranded as UNTV Life along with its upcoming shows and a new colorful 3D cube logo was introduced which was followed by a free concert courtesy of Wish 1075. On the following day, UNTV started airing with its new and refreshed look.

On May 18, 2016, President Benigno S. Aquino III signed Republic Act No. 10820 which renewed PBC's license for another 25 years. The law granted PBC a franchise to construct, install, operate, and maintain, for commercial purposes, radio broadcasting stations and television stations, including digital television system, with the corresponding facilities such as relay stations, throughout the Philippines.

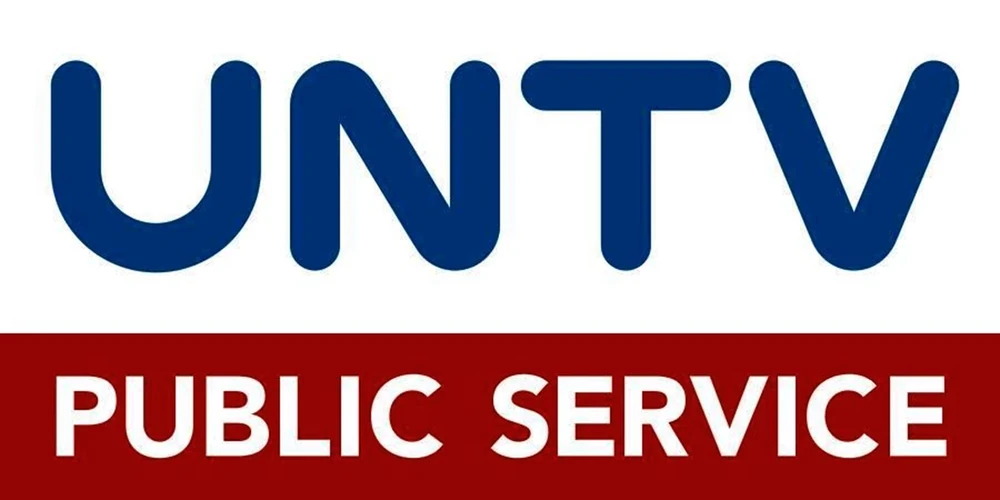
Logo of one of its program blocks after rebranding in 2016

===== UNTV News and Rescue/Public Service (2016 to present) =====
On July 18, 2016, UNTV Life underwent a major rebranding and rebranded to a global news and rescue company known as UNTV News and Rescue. The network meanwhile retained its long-time slogan, "Your Public Service Channel". After the refresh, its programs were classified into two programming blocks, UNTV News and Rescue and UNTV Public Service. The News and Rescue block is composed of newscasts such as Ito Ang Balita, UNTV Central News (UNTV C-News) and Why News and rescue-oriented program 911-UNTV. The Public Service block consists of public service and informative programs, including the network's newest public service program Serbisyong Bayanihan, religious programs like Ang Dating Daan and Itanong Mo Kay Soriano and entertainment and sports-oriented shows like ASOP Music Festival and UNTV Cup.

On August 19, 2019, UNTV has migrated to high-definition television broadcast. However, selected programs like Ang Dating Daan and Itanong Mo Kay Soriano still use a 4:3 aspect ratio, but stretched in an anamorphic 16:9 widescreen format.

As it needs more space, while waiting for the completion of the UNTV Broadcast Center, the station transferred its studios and production facilities to the La Verdad Christian College Building in Caloocan.

====== COVID-19 pandemic ======
As the world faces the global challenges brought by the COVID-19 pandemic, from March 16 to July 31, 2020, UNTV launched new slogans, "We serve the people, we give glory to God" for English-language newscasts, and the slogan "Diyos ang aming sandigan, serbisyo publiko ang aming pinahahalagahan" (English: God is our support, public service is what we value) for its Tagalog newscasts.

During the Luzon-wide ECQ, UNTV pioneered purely remote, live online shows on Philippine television. Its morning program, Good Morning Kuya, went live on March 17, 2020, with all of its hosts at home and online. This was mirrored across all of UNTV's news programs.

On April 8, 2020, UNTV aired the remote broadcast of Serbisyong Bayanihan, hosted by UNTV-BMPI President and CEO Kuya Daniel Razon, live from a makeshift studio at his residence. The public service program caters to helping those affected by the COVID-19 pandemic and educates the audience with updates about health protocols and announcements from authorities, including reports from UNTV's international correspondents. It also served to carry out small acts of kindness and opened direct access to government agencies and officials.

Also during the COVID-19 pandemic, UNTV launched its telemedicine platform for free medical consultations dubbed as UNTV Digital Clinic for outpatient and non-emergency cases.

On October 8, 2020, UNTV and Members Church of God International inaugurated a free-service, quarantine facility in the City of Malolos, province of Bulacan, for probable and mild cases of coronavirus disease (COVID-19). The health facility has 32 individual isolation rooms manned by full-time doctors, nurses, and non-medical personnel to assist the patients.

====== New programs ======
In June 2020, UNTV aired the pilot broadcast of Hataw Balita Pilipinas (later Hataw Balita Probinsya) newscast with live reports from its provincial correspondents. It was followed by UNTV News Worldwide newscast filled with live reports from international correspondents.

In October 2020, veteran broadcaster Don Manolo Favis aired his new daily program Ito ang Inyong Lingkod, Don Manolo at UNTV Radyo La Verdad, simulcast on UNTV's digital television subchannel STV (now defunct). Don Manalo is a long-time radio host at GMA Network's AM radio station DZBB and known for his long-running radio program This is Manolo and His GENIUS (God’s Eternal News in Universal Salvation) Family where international televangelist Bro. Eli Soriano, host of Ang Dating Daan religious program, became one of the show's regular panelists since the 80s.

On December 5, 2020, health-oriented program Healing Galing hosted by veteran broadcast journalist and naturopathy practitioner Dr. Edinell Calvario, aired its two-hour pilot live broadcast in UNTV with assigned timeslot every Saturday and Sunday mornings. Calvario is a pioneer DZMM Radyo Patrol 630 field reporter, the radio arm of multimedia giant ABS-CBN. Healing Galing shares information and offers advice during its on-air show about naturopathy employing a wide array of herbal supplements with emphasis on diet and lifestyle changes. The move came after its former home TV5 Network, owned by PLDT's MediaQuest Holdings, abruptly cancelled airing Healing Galing show, including its simulcast over its radio arm Radyo5 92.3 News FM (now 105.9 True FM) due to a programming revamp of TV5 and Radyo5 under the leadership of TV5/Cignal President and CEO Robert Galang.

== Digital transition ==
=== Digital terrestrial television ===
UNTV is currently testing Japan's Integrated Service Digital Broadcasting-Terrestrial (ISDB-T), the sole digital television (DTV) standard in the Philippines for its transition from analog to digital broadcast. During its ninth anniversary celebration in 2013, Daniel Razon announced the network's ongoing transition from analog to digital broadcast. The activity includes upgrading of technical equipment and studio facilities.

After a year, UNTV began its test broadcast in Metro Manila using its new digital transmitter in Antipolo. On October 2, 2014, UNTV began its simulcast test broadcast on UHF channel 38 (617.143 MHz) along with its analog broadcast on UHF channel 37. It has two standard definition (SD) channels and one 1seg or “oneseg” channel. 1seg is the common name of DTV service specifically for mobile phone devices. UNTV multi-channel line-up also includes one high definition (HD) channel called “ADDTV” or Ang Dating Daan TV showing purely religious programs. Its digital broadcast can be received in Metro Manila and nearby provinces like Bulacan, Pampanga, Cavite and Rizal, using ISDB-T set top boxes including LED TV sets and mobile devices with built-in ISDB-T tuners. In a DTV signal test conducted by Philippine mobile phone brand Starmobile last April 2015, UNTV was present in eight out of 14 locations in Metro Manila with decent signal strength of three up to the maximum of four signal bars.

In April 2016, Anywave Communication Technologies Co. Ltd. announced that UNTV tapped Anywave for its implementation of analog and digital transmitters. Anywave is a manufacturer of television and radio transmission equipment with headquarters in Illinois, United States.

In 2018, BMPI launched Social TV (STV) subchannel on digital terrestrial television airing entertainment and educational videos from social media contributors and vloggers. In May 2020, it was discontinued and was reverted to UNTV's mirror channel feed, this time at 1080p resolution.

On January 1, 2025, UNTV ceased its analog broadcast on UHF Channel 37. However, their plans to flash cut their digital signal into the former analog channel 37 was not materialized yet.

== News and current affairs ==
UNTV News and Current Affairs (also known as UNTV News) is the news division of UNTV News and Rescue. The organization is responsible for the daily news and information gathering for its news programs. It serves UNTV, UNTV Radio La Verdad 1350 kHz and UNTV News website.

The division operates at UNTV Building in Quezon City and has news bureaus in various provinces and abroad. It has news correspondents and stringers in North America, South America, Europe, Asia Oceania and the Middle East.

Currently, it is headed by Bernard Dadis, while the North America News Bureau Chief is Joselito Mallari. UNTV Radio La Verdad 1350 kHz, UNTV's flagship AM radio station is headed by station manager Annie Rentoy.

All newscasts (except Why News which is delivered in English) are presented in the Filipino vernacular. In 2016, UNTV reporters started delivering pre-recorded reports in different languages. Province-based reporters delivered the news in Filipino or in their native dialects, while foreign-based correspondents using in English or any foreign languages in their reports. Second-language subtitles were also introduced for the benefit of hearing-impaired viewers (English subtitles on all newscasts for the benefit of international viewers, but may add Filipino subtitles for regional and international reports). However, the subtitles were discontinued on March 16, 2020.

=== News and rescue team ===
In July 2010, Daniel Razon launched an advocacy "Tulong Muna Bago Balita" (English: Lifelines Before Headlines; lit: Rescue First, Report Later). UNTV correspondents are not pressured to break or report news exclusives but encourages media practitioners to prioritize saving lives as part of their profession. UNTV News correspondents were sent to an emergency response training (ERT) course. They were trained by the Search and Rescue Unit Foundation, Inc. (SARUF), a recognized army rescue unit in the Philippines, to be rescuers, from first-aid applications to technical search and rescue operations. After passing the ERT, the news team was renamed UNTV News and Rescue Team. On November 28, 2010, the network launched 15 news and rescue mobile units and later, a News and Rescue Command Center at the UNTV Building. The team are equipped with all-terrain/amphibian vehicles and rescue trucks for their operations. The station also launched the UNTV Fire Brigade after acquiring new firetrucks.

In August 2015, an underwater rescue team and hundreds of new rescuers were introduced. A new hotline for emergency situations, 911-UNTV (911–8688), was also launched. In 2016, news anchors and program hosts of the network also joined the rescue training.

=== Drone journalism ===
In 2013, UNTV marked another first in Philippine TV news landscape as the network acquired DJI Phantom aerial drones for their live news reporting. In November 2013, drones were used by UNTV for its coverage of the Typhoon Haiyan aftermath in Tacloban, Leyte. Currently, drones are used by the network in reporting traffic. The UNTV drone coverages set the standards for other channels to follow.

== Notable on-air personalities ==
- Bro. Eli Soriano†
- Kuya Daniel Razon
- Ayra Mariano
- Joshua Dionisio

== Public service ==
All these public services are located at their studio at EDSA-Philam. The daily free medical consultations were done at 164 Congressional Avenue, Barangay Bahay-Toro, Quezon City.

- 911-UNTV (8688): News and Rescue in Metro Manila and in key cities around the Philippines
- UNTV Digital Clinic (launched during COVID-19 pandemic)
- MCGI-UNTV Health Facility in City of Malolos, Bulacan (COVID-19 quarantine facility)
- Serbisyong Bayanihan
- Cleanup Drives
- MCGI Pharmacy (Former Clinic ni Kuya) (Free Clinic)
- Job Fair ni Kuya
- MCGI Law Center (Former Law Center ni Kuya)(Free Legal Counseling)
- Libreng Sakay (Free One-Ride Bus Ride)
- Manibela Academy
- Munting Pangarap TV program (Simple Wish)
- Transient Home
- Tulong Muna Bago Balita (Rescue First, Report Later)
- UNTV Fire Brigade
- Radyo La Verdad Mobile Radio Booth
- Wish 107.5 Bus

== Accolades ==
| Year | Award | Category | Categories/Personalities/Programs | Ref |
|---|---|---|---|---|
| 2005 | 8th Philippine Web Awards | People's Choice Award | Media and Entertainment Category | |
| 2006 | 9th Philippine Web Awards | People's Choice Award | News and Media Category | |
| 2007 | 10th Philippine Web Awards | Best Website Award | Media Category | |
| 2007 | 10th Philippine Web Awards | People's Choice Award | Media Category | |
| 2010 | PMPC Star Awards for TV | Best Male Newscaster | Daniel Razon | |
| 2010 | PMPC Star Awards for TV | Best Morning Show | Good Morning Kuya | |
| 2010 | PMPC Star Awards for TV | Best Public Service Program | Bitag LIVE! | |
| 2010 | PMPC Star Awards for TV | Best TV Public Service Announcement | Isang Araw Lang (Drugs infomercial) | |
| 2014 | 1st PUP Mabini Media Awards | Best Public Service Television Station | UNTV | |
| 2014 | DSWD | Maalaga Award | UNTV | |
| 2014 | 22nd KBP Golden Dove Awards | Best TV Public Service Announcement | Caring for the Elderly | |
| 2014 | 22nd KBP Golden Dove Awards | Best TV Children's Program | KNC Show | |
| 2015 | Gawad Amerika Awards | Most Promising News Personality | William Thio for Why News | |
| 2015 | 23rd KBP Golden Dove Awards | Lifetime Achievement Award | PBC Chairman Emeritus Hilarion "Larry" Henares | |
| 2015 | DSWD | Pagpapahalaga Award | UNTV Life | |
| 2015 | 29th PMPC Star Awards for TV | Best Talent Search Program | A Song of Praise (ASOP) Music Festival | |
| 2015 | 29th PMPC Star Awards for TV | Best Children Show | KNC Show | |
| 2015 | 29th PMPC Star Awards for TV | Best Children Show Hosts | Eric Cabobos, Bency Vallo, Moonlight Alarcon, Cid Capulong, Cedie Isip, Kim Enriquez, Tim Argallon, Angelica Tejana, Leanne Manalanzan and Kyla Manalang for KNC Show | |
| 2016 | Anak TV | Anak TV Seal Awardee | For 22 different shows | |
| 2017 | 31st PMPC Star Awards for TV | Best Talent Search Program | A Song of Praise (ASOP) Music Festival | |
| 2019 | 33rd PMPC Star Awards for TV | Best Documentary Program Host | William Thio for Spotlight | |
| 2021 | 34th PMPC Star Awards for TV | Best Morning Show Hosts | Daniel Razon, Angela Lagunzad, Angelo ‘Diego’ Castro III, Rheena Villamor, Barba-Cabodil-De Vera, Dr. Joseph Lee and Dr. Bong Santiago for Good Morning Kuya | |
| 2021 | 6th Guild of Educators, Mentors, and Students (GEMS) - Hiyas ng Sining Awards | Best Public Service Program | Healing Galing Live | |
| 2021 | 6th Guild of Educators, Mentors, and Students (GEMS) - Hiyas ng Sining Awards | Best Public Service Program Host | Dr. Edinell Calvario | |

=== Nominations ===
- Nominated, Best TV Station (PMPC Star Awards for TV 2006–2016)
- Nominated, Best TV Station in Metro Manila (KBP Golden Dove Awards 2005–2011)

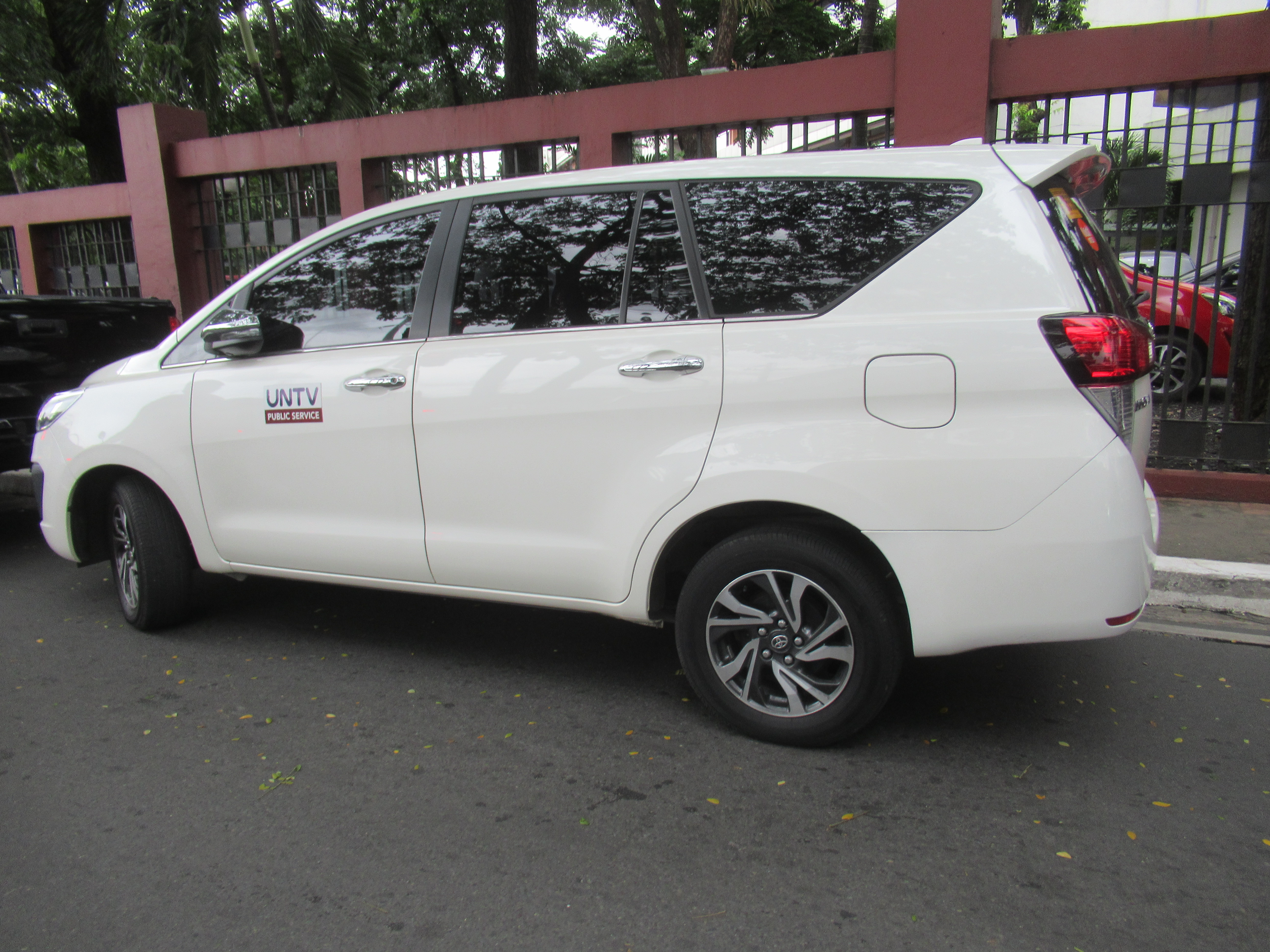
UNTV broadcasting vehicle

== Programming ==
UNTV's well-balanced program lineup consists of news and public service programs, religious programs, entertainment and informative programs, talk shows, sports shows, and educational programs. It also launched a regular community prayer aimed at bringing the prayerful lifestyle using broadcast media. The programs shown on the network are produced by BMPI. Meanwhile, religious programs are produced by the Members Church of God International.

Aside from these mentioned, UNTV also acts as a news channel. In case of developing stories, and even important or scheduled live coverage, UNTV pre-empts its regularly scheduled programming to give way for the developing news stories and/or important coverage of a news story as it happens. Regular scheduled programming resume once the coverage of an important event has ended.

== Television stations ==
=== Digital stations ===
UNTV is currently testing Japan's Integrated Service Digital Broadcasting - Terrestrial (ISDB-T), the sole digital television (DTV) standard in the Philippines for its transition from analog to digital broadcast. On October 2, 2014, UNTV began its simulcast test broadcast on UHF Channel 38 (617.143 MHz) with three high definition (HD) channel and one 1seg channel. UNTV's digital broadcast can be received in Metro Manila and nearby provinces using ISDB-T set top boxes, including LED TV sets and mobile devices with built-in ISDB-T tuners. In a DTV signal test conducted by Philippine mobile phone brand Starmobile last April 2015, UNTV was present in eight out of 14 locations in Metro Manila with decent signal strength of three up to the maximum of four signal bars.

| Branding | Callsign | Ch. # | Frequency | Power (kW) | Station Type | Transmitter Location | Coverage Area | Status |
|---|---|---|---|---|---|---|---|---|
| UNTV Manila | DWAO-DTV | 38 | 617.143 MHz | (2.5 kW) | Originating | UNTV Transmitter Complex, Sumulong Highway, Brgy. Sta. Cruz, Antipolo City, Rizal | Metro Manila, Rizal, Bulacan, Pampanga, Laguna, Cavite, Quezon and | Migrated from Analog to Digital; Free-to-air test broadcast |

=== Digital channel line-up ===
Channels on the UNTV multiplex
| Stream | Short name | LCN | Aspect Ratio | Video Format | Resolution | FPS | Scan | Audio Format | EPG | BML | Programming |
|---|---|---|---|---|---|---|---|---|---|---|---|
| SD 1 | UNTV-1 | 55.01 | 16:9 | H.264 | 654x480p | 29.97 | Interlace | HE-AAC | None | None | UNTV |
| SD 2 | STV | 55.02 | 16:9 | H.264 | 1920x1080p | 29.97 | Interlace | HE-AAC | None | None | UNTV |
| HD 3 | TRUTH CHANNEL | 55.03 | 16:9 | H.264 | 1920x1080p Upscaled | 29.97 | Interlace | HE-AAC | None | None | TRUTH CHANNEL video library |
| HD 4 | UNTV Reserve | 55.04 | 16:9 | H.264 | 1920x1080p Upscaled | 29.97 | Interlace | HE-AAC | None | None | Black Screen |
| 1SEG | UNTV 1SEG | 55.31 | 4:3 | H.264 | 320x240p | (No Data) | Progressive | HE-AAC | None | None | UNTV (mirror feed) |

== Satellite broadcast ==
UNTV can be received via satellite in the Philippines and other countries in Asia, Australia, Middle East, Europe and Africa.

| Type | Satellite | Band | Position | Beam | Frequency | Polarity | System | SR FEC | Encryption | Coverage |
|---|---|---|---|---|---|---|---|---|---|---|
| Free-to-air (FTA) | Measat 3A | C Band | 91.5° East | Global | 3705 | Horizontal | DVB-S MPEG-2 | 4290 3/4 | None | Asia, Australia, Middle East, South Eastern Europe and Eastern Africa |

== Pay television ==
| Pay TV Provider | Type | Ch. # | Coverage |
|---|---|---|---|
| SkyCable/Destiny Cable | Digital | 58 | Metro Manila, Rizal, Cavite, Laguna and Bulacan |
| Cablelink | Digital | 99 | Metro Manila |
| DASCA Cable | Digital | 111 | Dasmariñas |
| Cignal TV | Satellite (Digital) | 182 | Nationwide |
| Sky Direct | Satellite (Digital) | 10 | Nationwide |
| G Sat | Satellite (Digital) | 11 | Nationwide |
| SatLite | Satellite (Digital) | 101 | Nationwide |
| Other cable/satellite providers | N/A | N/A | check with local operators |

== Internet streaming ==
UNTV can be received via online streaming by encoding the network's streaming link URL in the VLC Media Player installed on personal computers and mobile devices.

Network Streaming URL
https://cdn.untvweb.com/live-stream/chunklist_b2592000.m3u8

== Mobile application ==
In 2013, BMPI launched the UNTV Mobile App for Apple iOS and Google Android mobile and tablet devices. In 2016, it was made available for Windows Mobile phones. By downloading the mobile application, users with stable internet connection will be able to watch the broadcast feed of UNTV News and Rescue and listen to Radio La Verdad 1350 kHz for free.

| Application | Platform | Download Link |
|---|---|---|
| UNTV Mobile App | Apple iOS | Apple iTunes Store |
| UNTV Mobile App | Google Android | Google Play Store |
| UNTV Mobile App | Microsoft Windows Mobile | Microsoft Store |
