= Daniel Razon =

Filipino host and businessman

Bro. Daniel Razon
- MCGI; Overall Servant

Personal details
- Born: Daniel Soriano Razon; October 11, 1967 (age 58) Bulacan, Philippines
- Denomination: Members Church of God International
- Occupation: Television host, singer, Overall Servant (formerly Presiding Minister)
- Notable credit(s): Ang Dating Daan co-host Gising Pilipinas anchor Compañero y Compañera co-host Unang Hirit co-host (2001–05); Frontpage: Ulat ni Mel Tiangco alternate anchor (2001–04); Saksi alternate anchor (2001–05); 24 Oras alternate anchor (2004–05); Good Morning Kuya main anchor
- Website: http://www.danielrazon.com/

YouTube information
- Channel: KDR TV
- Years active: 2018–present
- Genres: Biblical inspiration, Lifestyle, Religious
- Subscribers: 160 thousand
- Views: 15.4 million
- Last updated: July 5, 2022

Daniel Soriano Razon (Tagalog: [ˈdɐnjɛl soɾˈjano ɾaˈson]; born October 11, 1967) is a Filipino television and radio host. He is currently the Overall Servant (minister; Tagalog: Lingkod Pangkalahatan) of the Members Church of God International, succeeding Eli Soriano after the latter's death on February 11, 2021.

== Careers ==
=== As a broadcaster ===
From 1987 to 1988, Daniel Razon was an FM disc jockey at DWKY and DWST. He then shifted to television as a newscaster on PTV-4's Pangunahing Balita, Balita Ala-Una and PTV News Nationwide and host of the public-affairs programs Ang Pandayan ni Mang Pandoy and Dakila Ka Pinoy (1993 to 1997). He was also the executive producer and director of the public-affairs program of IBC-13, Ikaw ang Humatol (1994–1997).

From 1997 to 2003, Razon worked at another TV station, ABS-CBN, and became the host/newscaster of numerous TV shows such as Hoy, Gising (Hey! Wake Up!), Pulso: Aksyon Balita. Soon, he was seen worldwide via ANC (ABS-CBN's sister station) as newscaster/anchorman for Dateline News (1998 to 2000) and as program host of Kumusta Ka, Bayan on The Filipino Channel (TFC). During those years he was also an anchor for the TV show Gising Pilipinas (1997–2003) and Usapang de Campanilla (2000 to 2003) over DZMM 630 AM.

In October 2002, Razon moved to ABS-CBN's rival network GMA-7, where he became one of the hosts of Unang Hirit and anchor of Unang Balita, the show's news segment. He left GMA in 2005.

On June 16, 2005, it was reported by the Manila Bulletin that Razon was forced to resign from GMA for the network "to maintain its neutrality in the midst of the ongoing bitter conflict between the Iglesia ni Cristo (Church of Christ; INC) and the Members Church of God International (MCGI). At that time, Razon was the Vice Presiding Minister of MCGI, and the network had been receiving text messages from both INC and MCGI members, each accusing the other of wrongdoing. GMA "felt being placed in the middle of such conflict will not serve its best interest and decided to let go of Razon." The source of INC's complaint stemmed from Razon's pronouncement in MCGI's doctrinal activity in which he said "You can see demons in Net 25 (a network owned by the INC's affiliate Eagle Broadcasting Corporation)." Razon was quoted in the MCGI website as saying "I'd rather lose everything than to lose God" in reaction to the conflict he was facing regarding his job in Unang Hirit and in Ang Dating Daan (The Old Path).

In July 2005, Razon transferred its present home to UNTV, a UHF television network owned by the Progressive Broadcasting Corporation majority owned by Alfredo "Atom" Henares for the launching of his own morning program on UNTV, Pilipinas, Gising Ka Na Ba?!, On August 1 of the same year, Razon also launched its own public service program on UNTV, Kaka In Action (later renamed as Kaka at Claire, Kaagapay Niyo and Kaagapay in 2006 until eventually cancelled in 2016), the program dedicated to public service. On July 23, 2007, Pilipinas Gising Ka na Ba?! was changed to Good Morning Kuya (lit. Good Morning Brother).

=== As a musician ===
Razón is also a singer and songwriter. Some of his compositions are Unang Pag-ibig (First Love), Dala Kong Nakalimbag and Pangarap ng Puso (My Heart's Wish). His maiden album "In My Eyes" reached platinum record status. His latest album "All My Life" was released in September 2008, which was awarded a gold record on the day of its release and earned him the People's Choice Favorite New Male Artist award in the 21st Awit Awards on November 26, 2008.

== Charities ==
Daniel, through his morning talk show Good Morning Kuya and public service program Serbisyong Bayanihan, started many public service projects such as free medical/dental check-ups and medicines for the indigent. Razon's regular free medical missions are achieved through his Mobile Clinic Bus, which can reach even far-flung towns in the Philippines.

On January 15, 2008, Razon's morning TV show Good Morning Kuya was cited by then-DOTC Secretary Leandro Mendoza for establishing a public service program Alay Kay Nanay at Tatay Project for senior citizens riding the MRT3. Over 5,000 senior citizens were served by the program and provided free travel aboard the MRT3.

In February 2009, Razon and Soriano together with the Kamanggagawa Foundation Inc., launched the Isang Araw Lang (Just One Day) advocacy. The advocacy aims to educate people to and help the needy for just one day. The campaign aims to inspire talented people to commit their talents, skills and resources for the less fortunate, also for just one day.

He led the construction and currently serves as the president of a free school for tertiary students located in Apalit, Pampanga and Caloocan. With this program, Daniel Razon makes sure that every scholars of this program will enjoy zero tuition fees and many other benefits including free food, lodging & transportation.

In 2011, the Polytechnic University of the Philippines awarded Razon the title of "Doctor of Humanities – Honoris Causa" for his public services and charitable works.

Razon conceptualized the original charity basketball league in the Philippines, the UNTV Cup, which started in 2013. Its goal is to promote camaraderie between government agencies through basketball, while delivering public service towards marginalized sectors of our society. The regular season runs from August/September up to March of the following year. The awarding of prizes to the agencies' chosen beneficiaries coincide with the UNTV Cup championship games. From Season 1 to Season 6, including the three off season tournaments, UNTV Cup has given a total of ₱35 million to the beneficiaries of the participating teams.

== Controversies ==
Razon was declared a persona non grata by the Municipal Government of Apalit, Pampanga, the same town where the Philippine headquarters of Members Church of God International is located for stating unsavory remarks against the Mayor of Apalit, who once aggrieved Soriano. The Municipal Council approved the declaration through Resolution 28, series of 2008. The resolution further stated that "Razon's pronouncement in the Good Morning Kuya TV-charity program has misinformed and misled the public and is meant to malign the wisdom of its officials and put them in a bad light."

Persona non grata declaration
Issuing LGUs	Date of effectivity
Apalit, Pampanga	May 8, 2008

== Filmography ==
=== Film ===
Year	Title	Role	Theater Releases	Other notes
2009	Isang Araw Lang	Daniel Balagtas	July 19, 2009 at the Meralco Theater and streamed on YouTube on March 30, 2020	Razon also co-directed the film.
2013	Isang Araw	Daniel Baltazar	November 28, 2013 at the Sofitel Plaza and streamed on YouTube on March 31, 2020	A sequel to the movie Isang Araw Lang.
2016	Isang Araw, Ikatlong Yugto	Daniel Baltazar	December 15, 2016 at the Marriott Hotel and streamed on YouTube on April 2, 2020	A sequel to the movie Isang Araw.

=== Television ===
- Ang Dating Daan (1983–present)
- Good Morning Kuya (2010–present)
- Get It Straight with Daniel Razon (2007–2023)
- Manibela (2019)
- Serbisyong Bayanihan (2016)

=== Radio ===
- Ang Dating Daan (1980–present)

== Discography ==
=== Albums ===
- Isang Araw Lang
- All My Life
- Test Broadcast 2

== Awards and nominations ==
Year	Award giving body	Category	Nominated work	Results
2008	Awit Awards	Best Performance by a New Male Recording Artist (People's Choice Award)	"All My Life"	Won
2008	Awit Awards	Best Performance by a New Male Recording Artist (Performance Award)	All My Life	Nominated
2009	Anak TV Awards	Anak TV Seal Award	Good Morning Kuya	Won
2009	Anak TV Awards	Anak TV Seal Award	Munting Pangarap	Won
2009	PMPC Star Awards for Television	Best Morning Show Host	Good Morning Kuya	Nominated
2016	Anak TV Awards	Makabata Star	—N/a	Won
2017	Golden Dove Awards	KBP Lifetime Achievement Award	—N/a	Won
