= DXNY =

DXNY is the callsign of two stations in Cagayan de Oro, Philippines:

- DXNY-FM, an FM radio station branded as Win Radio
- DXNY-TV, a TV station branded as UNTV
