= DWBM-FM =

Radio station in Metro Manila, Philippines

Brigada News FM Manila (DWBM)
- Pasig; Philippines
- Broadcast area: Mega Manila surrounding areas
- Frequency: 105.1 MHz (FM Stereo)
- RDS: BRIGADA
- Branding: 105.1 Brigada News FM

Programming
- Language: Filipino
- Format: Contemporary MOR, News, Talk
- Network: Brigada News FM

Ownership
- Owner: Mareco Broadcasting Network
- Operator: Brigada Mass Media Corporation

History
- First air date: 1963
- Former call signs: DZLM-AM (1963–1972); DWLM-FM (1973–1985)
- Former names: DZLM (1963–1972); Super Tunog Pinoy (1973–1985); Power 105 (1985–1994); Crossover (1994–2019); Q Radio (2020–2023)
- Former frequencies: 1430 kHz (1963–1972)
- Call sign meaning: Best Music (former slogan)

Technical information
- Licensing authority: NTC
- Class: C, D and E
- Power: 25,000 watts
- ERP: 60,000 watts
- Repeater: Baguio: DZBM 105.1 MHz

Links
- Webcast: Live Stream
- Website: Brigada Philippines

DWBM (105.1 FM), on-air as 105.1 Brigada News FM, is a radio station owned by Mareco Broadcasting Network and operated under an airtime lease agreement by Brigada Mass Media Corporation. It serves as a Luzon flagship station of the Brigada News FM Network. The station's studio is located at the 26th Floor, One San Miguel Avenue Bldg., San Miguel Avenue corner Shaw Boulevard, Ortigas Center, Pasig; its transmitter is located at San Carlos Heights, Binangonan.

== History ==
=== 1963–1973: DZLM ===
Mareco Broadcasting Network, Inc., owned by Villar family led by Manuel Sr., made its debut in the radio industry in 1963. The family were the pioneers of the country's music industry which had started Mabuhay and Villar records, two of the country's first and then largest recording companies. The latter was also the licensee of many foreign labels, including RCA, Columbia and Motown.

DZLM Love Radio 1430 was established by the family, being one of the network's first AM radio stations; another was DZBM 740 which first went on the air. Both stations originally served only as a promotional venue for Mareco's record labels. While played a local recording once daily, they mostly played records under foreign labels as well; all requested by the listeners within their 19-hour run in later years.

The station was known for pioneering the contemporary hit radio (top 40) format, as well as playing dance music in 1971.

=== 1973–1994: Move to FM ===
Upon the declaration of nationwide martial law in 1972, a decree was issued ordering a broadcast company to operate an AM and an FM station in each area. While DZBM was kept, DZLM migrated to FM the following year, later becoming DWLM 105.1. DZBM, on the other hand, had played a variety of the latest in popular music and consistently topped the surveys; had the magazine-type format until becoming the first AM station to reformat and subsequently the top-rated pop music station for at least five to six years, and later became DWOO with a showbiz-oriented format. The station, now owned by Interactive Broadcast Media, is currently operated as DWWW 774.

The station continued with its format, competing with DZRJ-FM. The station later became Super Tunog Pinoy with an all-Filipino format, and then Power 105 (DZ)BM FM with a new wave format from 1985 to 1991, competing with WXB 102 (then at 102.7 FM).

Thereafter, the station changed its call letters to DWBM-FM and its format to be adapted by its succeeding management. It was in this decade when the station became the country's first CNN radio affiliate.

=== 1994–2019: Crossover ===
Third and final logo as 105.1 Crossover

In 1994, when Luis Villar sold the shares to his children, the station went to his son, Louie, who reformatted it as Crossover. The station pioneered the smooth jazz format; a blend of cool jazz, rhythm and blues, Latin, pop, classic soul, samba, and tropical music; the combination of these was described by the Villars as the "most literal translation" of the station's name they had coined and later popularized. It was able to distinguish itself from Citylite 88.3 which plays only jazz. The station's first corporate logo—roughly based on a silhouette of jazz pianist Ahmad Jamal—was introduced in 1996. Being classified as an avant-garde music station by then, high-income listeners were the target audiences.

Few years later, Crossover expanded to the provinces with 99.1 FM in Bacolod, 93.1 FM in Cebu City (later moved to 90.7 FM), 93.1 FM in Davao City, all in 1997; and 105.1 FM in Baguio (Manila's relay station) in 2000. All of those stations share the same playlist as the one in Manila to avoid shortchanging the audiences. A plan to put up another in Cagayan de Oro didn't come to fruition. The Crossover format is also webcast worldwide in real time on their official website.

In early 2000s, the station organized nationwide concert series, which featured Martin Nievera, Jaya, Lani Misalucha, and Zsa Zsa Padilla, as well as monthly pocket concerts and bar tours around Metro Manila. They also produced live concerts by foreign artists, jazz performers Bobby Caldwell and Phil Perry, David Benoit, Basia, and The Spinners.

The station eventually produced a series of CDs that would later be given recognitions.

During the early 2000s, the station had no DJs in favor of playing music. By that time, Louie Villar explained that its playlist were based on quality rather than popularity.

It became an affiliate of the BBC World Service.

In June 2014, 105.1 Crossover celebrated its 20th year with the theme "Celebrating 20 Years of Great Music." At the same time, the station had its first two disc jockeys after almost a decade, April Padil (formerly from NU 107) who boarded during weekday mornings and Benjamin (Reuben "Beng" Chua, formerly of Dream FM and Citylite who is a former voiceover of PTV/NBN from 1998 to 2011 and AksyonTV from 2013 to 2019; he currently serves as the alternate voiceover of both RPTV and TV5 since 2024), also boarded during weekday evenings.

=== 2019–2023: Q Radio ===
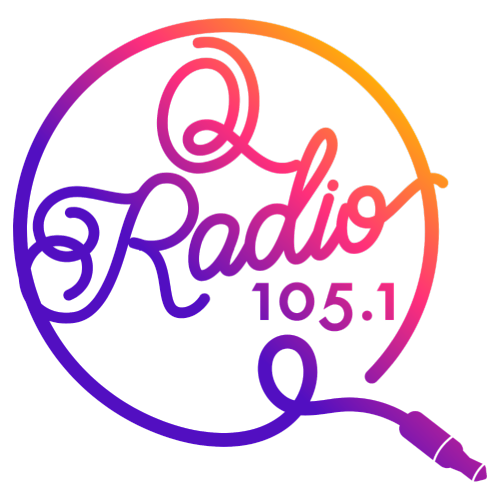
Q Radio 105.1 Manila (2020–2023)

On December 30, 2019, 105.1 FM silently dropped its Crossover brand and smooth jazz format and switched to a Top 40 format, as MBN opted to lease the station's airtime to Horizon of the Sun Communications (producer of Chinese Filipino oriented shows Chinatown TV and Chinese News TV). The station announced on the following day that the Crossover FM format has migrated online (via its live stream application). Its Baguio relay station have also adopted the new format. While other MBN regional stations still broadcasts under the Crossover brand and format, they would soon follow suit with the Manila station.

On January 13, 2020, the station was officially launched as Q Radio. Former PBS deputy director general and former Quest Broadcasting Inc. executive Carlo Jose Magno Villo was brought in as the station's director, along with several DJs from various upscale stations. It airs daily news updates with reporting segments on local and international news, business, entertainment and lifestyle.

On March 1, 2020, former Monster Radio jock and chief digital strategist Lexy Angeles took over management of the station. In the same month, the station launched new shows: Q Eclectic, a Saturday evening show that featured predominantly OPM, K-pop, C-pop, and Latin Pop, Q Mix, a Saturday late night program that played music remixes, and Sunday Flashback, an all-day segment which aired 2000s music.

On November 16, 2020, all MBNI provincial stations started carrying the Q Radio branding. The station also opened a program for student DJs in January 2023 called, Qniversity.

On June 19, 2023, Q Radio announced that the station will permanently go off the air due to financial problems, as well as poor ratings and loss of advertisers' support. Q Radio 105.1 signed off at 12:00 am of July 1, 2023, with "The Last Time" by The Script as its swansong.

=== Since 2023: Brigada News FM ===
On June 27, 2023, Brigada Mass Media Corporation signed an agreement with Mareco, in which it would lease the station's airtime along with other Mareco stations in Baguio, Cebu and Davao. This includes the transfer of Brigada News FM National's operations from its former frequency assignment at 104.7 MHz, based in Batangas.

On July 1, 2023, minutes after Q Radio ceased its operations, the station began its test broadcast on this frequency, this time from BMMC's National Broadcast Center in Jacinta Building 2 in Makati. Its official broadcast began on July 3 at 4:00 a.m. as Brigada News FM Manila. Meanwhile, its former frequency was temporarily downgraded to a repeater before relaunching on July 24 as Brigada News FM Batangas with local programming.

On August 31, 2024, Brigada News FM station went off the air as part of the transfer of its studio and offices from Makati to One San Miguel Avenue Bldg. in Pasig. It went back on air on September 2, 2024.

== Crossover CD compilations ==
- Pop Goes Jazz (Ivory Records, 1995)
- Pop Goes Jazz 2 (Ivory Records, 1996)
- Crossover Classic (Ivory Records, 1997)
- Crossover Classic 2 (Ivory Records, 1997)
- Unwind: The Crossover Classic Collection (Ivory Records, 1998)
- Recall: The Crossover Collection (PolyGram Records, 1998)
- Unwind 2: Another Crossover Classic Collection (Ivory Records, 1999)
- Recall: Another Crossover Collection (MCA Universal, 1999)
- Crossover Rhythms (Universal Records, 1999)
- Closer to Home (Viva Records, 1999)
- Classic: The Crossover Collection (Ivory Records, 1999)
- Crossover Gold (Universal Records, 2000)
- Closer to Home 2 (Viva Records, 2001)
- The Greatest Crossover Classics Collection (MCA Universal, 2002)
- The Best of Crossover Live Presents (Viva Records, 2003)
- Remakes & Revivals (Sony Music Philippines, 2004)
- Soft & Warm (Warner Music Philippines, 2004)
- The Definitive Crossover Collection (MCA Music, 2005)
- The Big Easy (Universal Records, 2005)
- The Greatest Crossover Love Songs Collection (EMI Philippines, 2006)
- The Crossover Experience (MCA Music, 2011)
- The Crossover Cafe: Smooth Jazz & Sweet Soul (MCA Music, 2014)
- The Crossover Cafe 2 (MCA Music, 2015)
