= Ultrasonic Broadcasting System =

Radio station in the Philippines

Ultrasonic Broadcasting System, Inc.
- Type: Private
- Industry: Radio network
- Founded: 1991
- Headquarters: Pasig, Philippines
- Key people: Rebecca Sy, (Chairwoman); Grace Olores, (President)
- Owner: SYSU Group of Companies

Energy FM
- Type: Broadcast FM radio network, (Contemporary MOR, OPM)
- Country: Philippines
- Availability: Nationwide
- Founded: 1996 (in Davao)
- Motto: Hi Pangga! Wag mong sabihin radyo, sabihin mo, Energy!

Ultrasonic Broadcasting System, Inc. (UBSI) is a Philippine radio network owned by the SYSU Group of Companies, a conglomerate owned by the Sy family. UBSI owns a number of FM stations across the country under the Energy FM brand.

== History ==
UBSI was founded by the Sy family in 1991 with the launch of K-LOVE 1494.

In 1996, UBSI hired former station manager of DZMB and radio consultant Manuelito "Manny" F. Luzon as general manager. Under Luzon's management, he conceptualized a new FM network called Energy FM. It was launched first in Davao, followed by another station in Cebu (later transferred to 89.1 FM from 2003 to 2004) and in Naga.

In 2003, UBSI acquired the airtime lease of Metro Manila station DWKY 91.5 (owned by Mabuhay Broadcasting System, whom Luzon is also the FM operations consultant of the said company) and became 91.5 Energy FM. A year later in 2004, UBSI sold DWSS to FBS Radio Network, in exchange of the latter's stations in Dagupan and Cebu.

In 2009, DWKY, together with its provincial stations, won in the 18th KBP Golden Dove Awards as Best FM Station of the year.

In 2011, a year after Luzon left the company for PBC, Energy FM officially transferred its Manila station to 106.7 FM under a transitional partnership with station owner Dream FM Network of Interactive Broadcast Media. UBSI operated under an airtime lease agreement of the station months later.

== UBSI radio stations ==
Branding	Callsign	Frequency	Coverage
Energy FM Manila (Note: Owned by Interactive Broadcast Media.)	DWET	106.7 MHz	Metro Manila
Energy FM Dagupan	DWKT	90.3 MHz	Dagupan
Energy FM Naga	DWBQ	106.3 MHz	Naga
Energy FM Kalibo	DYUB	107.7 MHz	Kalibo, Aklan
Energy FM Dumaguete	DYMD	93.7 MHz	Dumaguete
Energy FM Cebu	DYLL	94.7 MHz	Cebu
Energy FM Toledo (Note: Operated by Mindanao Broadcasting Network.)	DYTD	92.7 MHz	Toledo
Energy FM Balamban	—N/a	91.3 MHz	Balamban
Energy FM Pagadian	DXUA	98.3 MHz	Pagadian
Energy FM Dipolog	DXLJ	103.7 MHz	Dipolog
Energy FM Sindangan	—N/a	90.7 MHz	Sindangan
Energy FM Gingoog (Note: Operated by 5K Broadcasting Network.)	DXQU	90.5 MHz	Gingoog
Energy FM Valencia	DXJX	96.1 MHz	Valencia
Energy FM Davao	DXDR	88.3 MHz	Davao
Energy FM Tagum	DXKS	95.1 MHz	Tagum
Energy FM Digos (Note: Operated by NSR Broadcasting Promotion.)	DXNW	91.1 MHz	Digos
Energy FM Kidapawan	DXUB	99.1 MHz	Kidapawan
Energy FM Koronadal (Note: Operated by the Radyo Astig Network.)	DXUC	96.9 MHz	Koronadal
