= DXNU =

DXNU may refer to the following stations in Davao City:

- DXNU-FM, an FM radio station branded as Win Radio
- DXNU-TV, a TV station branded as UNTV
