= Ito Ang Balita =

Philippine television news show

- Title card since 2025
- Genre: News broadcasting
- Created by: Progressive Broadcasting Corporation
- Developed by: UNTV News and Rescue
- Written by: Jennifer Hazel Valera; Marje Navarro; Irene Reillo
- Directed by: Rennie Aloc
- Presented by: Jun Soriao; Monica Verallo-Tantoco
- Opening theme: “Ito Ang Balita” new theme music 2023
- Ending theme: “Ito Ang Balita” new theme music 2023
- Country of origin: Philippines
- Original language: Filipino

Production
- Executive producers: Ruth Navales; Victor Cosare
- News editors: David Manangan; Shoon Erese; Israel Gerona; Neil Clarence Nazareno; Candido Macalalad III
- Production locations: UNTV News Studio, LVCC bldg., EDSA, Caloocan City, Philippines (2019–present)
- Camera setup: multicamera setup
- Running time: 90 minutes
- Production company: Breakthrough and Milestones Productions International

Original release
- Network: UNTV
- Release: July 12, 2004 – 2005
- Release: September 3, 2007 – present

UNTV Ito Ang Balita (lit. 'UNTV this is the news') is a Philippine radio and television late afternoon and flagship newscast of UNTV. Originally anchored by Josel Mallari and Luz Cruz., it premiered on July 12, 2004, coinciding with the relaunch of UNTV. The show is also streaming on YouTube and Facebook. The program temporarily left the air in 2005 and reinstated on September 3, 2007. It airs daily from Monday to Friday at 5:30 PM to 7:00 PM (PST UTC+8).

== Overview ==
Ito Ang Balita premiered on July 12, 2004, coinciding with the relaunch of UNTV. The newscast is also simulcast on radio thru DZXQ Radio La Verdad 1350 kHz AM in Mega Manila And Win Radio Stations Nationwide.

On July 18, 2016, along with Why News, Hataw Balita and UNTV News (now UNTV C-News) officially unveiled its brand new unified graphics and sound.

== Anchors ==
- Monica Verallo-Tantoco (since 2015)
- Jun Soriao (relief anchor; 2008–15; main anchor, since 2022)
- Bernard Dadis (since 2020, Weekend Edition)
- Rosalie Coz (since 2020, Weekend Edition)

=== Substitute anchors ===
- Nel Maribojoc (2025–present)
- Victor Cosare (2025–present)
- Bernard Dadis (2025–present)
- Aga Caacbay (2026–present)

=== Segment presenters ===
- Marveene Delfin (World Watch)
- Mon Jocson (H.U.W.A.T)

=== Former anchors ===
- Josel Mallari (2004–05)
- Luz Cruz (2004–05)
- Jay Sonza (2007–10)
- Candace Giron (2007–08)
- Nina Taduran (2008)
- Daniel Razon (2010–22)
- Bryan De Paz (2010–11)
- Ley-Ann Lugod (2010–12)
- Francis Rivera (2010–11)
- Rolly Lakay Gonzalo (2007–10: relief anchor for Sonza/Razon; 2010-15: main anchor)
- Wylla Soriano (2011–12)
- Louella de Cordova (2012–14)
- Nikka Clejofe-Alejar (2012–13)
- Atty. Regie Tongol (2013–19)
- Angela Lagunzad (2014–22)
- Thalia Javier (2015–17)
- Darlene Basingan (2016)

==== Former segment presenters ====
- Freema Salonga Gloria (2016–17, Provincial News)
- Rey Pelayo (since 2014, The Daily W.I.N.D.)
- Rosalie Coz (World Watch)
- Leslie Longboen (since 2017, Entertainment and World Watch)
- Deb Riveral/Janice Ingente (since 2018, Provincial News)
- Mon Jocson (fill-in anchor for Casin-Cosare)

== Ito Ang Balita Weekend Edition ==
Ito Ang Balita
- Title card since 2025
- Also known as: UNTV Ito ang Balita Weekend Edition
- Genre: News broadcasting
- Developed by: UNTV News and Rescue
- Opening theme: "Ito Ang Balita" New Theme Music 2023
- Ending theme: "Ito Ang Balita" New Theme Music 2023
- Country of origin: Philippines
- Original language: Filipino
- No. of episodes: N/A (airs every weekend)

Production
- Production locations: Caloocan City, Philippines
- Camera setup: multicamera setup
- Running time: 60 minutes (Weekend Edition)
- Production company: Breakthrough and Milestones Productions International

Original release
- Network: UNTV
- Release: June 6, 2020 – present

On June 6, 2020, UNTV expanded to six days a week, branding the weekend edition, albeit in a 1-hour capacity, unlike the 90-minute weekday edition.

== Program segments ==
- Tulong Muna Bago Balita – Emergency Response Reports
- Police Report (formerly Police Blotter) - Police Reports
- Traffic Report (formerly Traffic Update and Gabay Kalsada) – Traffic Updates across the Philippines
- World Watch – Stories from Around the Globe
- Balitang Promdi – Stories from across the Philippines
- Sports (formerly Sports Balita, Sports 37 and Sports News)- latest update for games, scores, and athletes like UNTV Cup.
- Entertainment and Feature News (formerly E News and Aliwan atbp.) updates for latest showbiz events and lifestyle features
- Serbisyong Bayanihan/MCGI Cares: Update – updates for charity events from MCGI and UNTV-37 Foundation
- Weather Update(formerly The Daily W.I.N.D.: Weather Insights Night and Day) – Weather News and Forecast
- Poll Watch – Election News
- DAGDAG KAALAMAN (Formerly HUWAT: Health Update, Weather and Traffic — The latest updates about traffic conditions, COVID-19 daily case updates, weather updates from PAGASA, and relevant trivia.) — features relevant trivia
- Usiserong Pinoy (Usapang Sinsero ng Pinoy) - features live chat comments of avid viewers from their YouTube livestream.
- Ibang Balita Ito - features trending topic videos on the social media platforms.

== Accolades ==
Year	Association	Category	Nominee(s)	Result
2012	AnakTV	AnakTV Seal Award	Ito ang Balita	Awarded

== See also ==
- Progressive Broadcasting Corporation
- UNTV News and Rescue
- Daniel Razon
