= DYNY-FM =

Radio station in Iloilo City, Philippines

Win Radio Iloilo (DYNY)
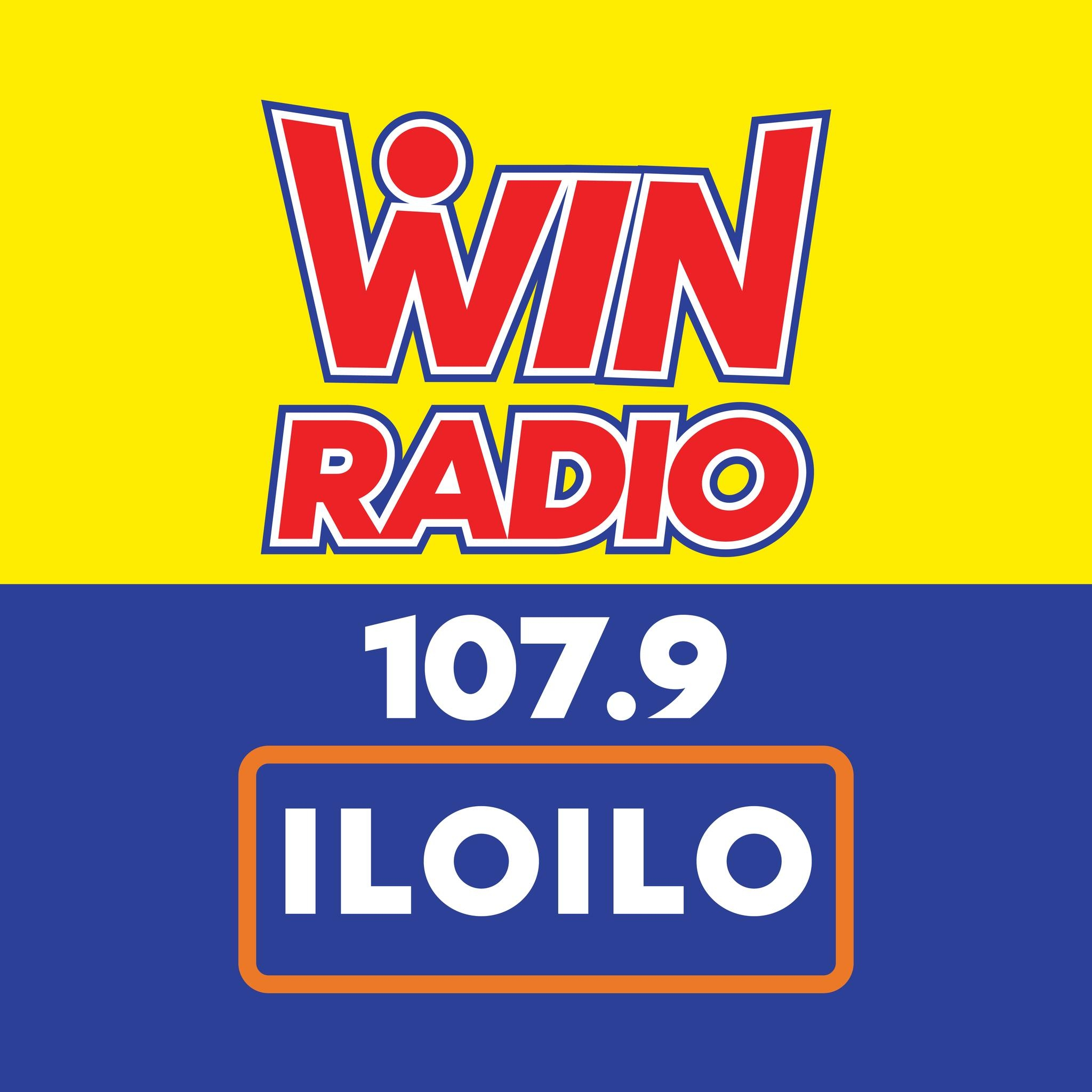
- Iloilo City; Philippines
- Broadcast area: Iloilo, Guimaras and surrounding areas
- Frequency: 107.9 MHz
- Branding: 107.9 Win Radio

Programming
- Languages: Hiligaynon, Filipino
- Format: Contemporary MOR, OPM
- Network: Win Radio

Ownership
- Owner: Mabuhay Broadcasting System
- Operator: ZimZam Management, Inc.

History
- First air date: 1992
- Former names: YNY 107 (1992-1994); NU 107 (1994-2011)
- Call sign meaning: Variant of DYNU

Technical information
- Licensing authority: NTC
- Power: 10,000 watts
- ERP: 20,000 watts

Links
- Website: winradio.com.ph

DYNY (107.9 FM), broadcasting as 107.9 Win Radio, is a radio station owned by Mabuhay Broadcasting System and operated by ZimZam Management, Inc. The station's studio and transmitter are located at Room 302, Delta Bldg., Quezon St., Iloilo City.

== History ==
The station began operations in 1992 as YNY 107 with a quite rock format, which evolved into modern rock format in later years. It was formerly under the ownership of Progressive Broadcasting Corporation. In 1994, it rebranded as NU 107 with the slogan Iloilo's Rock Radio with modern rock. In 2000, it became a relay station of DWNU in Manila. In 2010, after NU 107 renamed to Power 107 prelude to Win Radio brand it relayed the program until in 2012, it began airing its own local programming.

In 2016, after House Bill No. 5982 was passed into law, Mabuhay Broadcasting System acquired the provincial stations of PBC.
