= DWKT =

Radio station in Dagupan, Philippines

Energy FM Dagupan (DWKT)
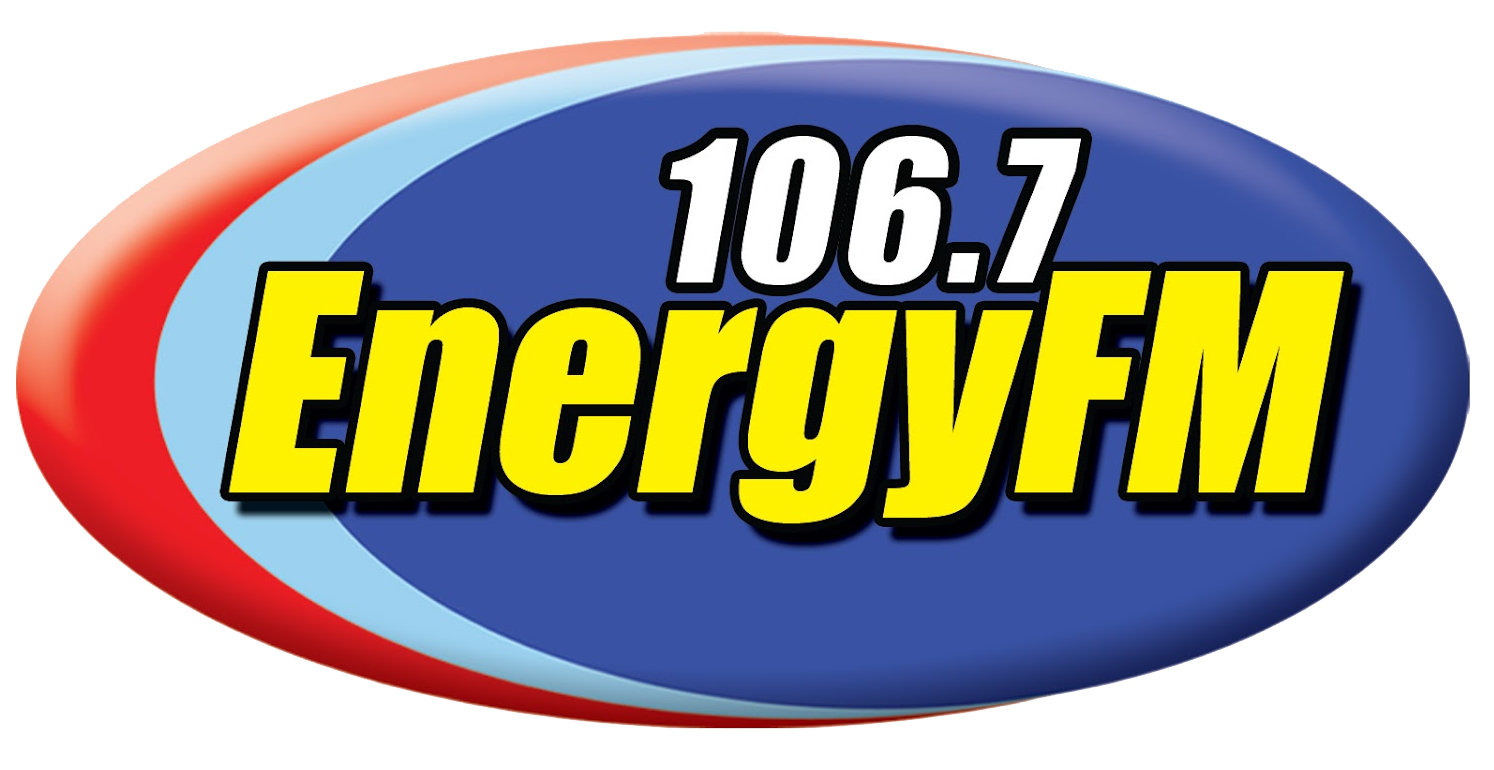

Dagupan; Philippines
- Broadcast area: Pangasinan and surrounding areas
- Frequency: 90.3 MHz
- Branding: 90.3 Energy FM

Programming
- Languages: Pangasinense, Filipino
- Format: Contemporary MOR, OPM
- Network: Energy FM

Ownership
- Owner: Ultrasonic Broadcasting System

History
- First air date: 1980s
- Former names: KT/Power (1980s); Mellow Touch (1992-2003)

Technical information
- Licensing authority: NTC
- Power: 10,000 watts
- ERP: 30,000 watts

Links
- Webcast: Listen Live

DWKT (90.3 FM), broadcasting as 90.3 Energy FM, is a radio station owned and operated by Ultrasonic Broadcasting System. Its studio, offices and transmitter are located at the 4th floor, Duque Tiongson Bldg., A.B. Fernandez Ave., Dagupan.

== History ==
The station was established in 1980s as KT 90.3. It carried a Top 40 format with the tagline Rhythm of Dagupan. It was later known as Power KT 903. In 1992, it rebranded as Mellow Touch 90.3 and switched to a Soft AC format. On October 20, 2003, UBSI acquired the station from FBS Radio Network as part of ownership swapping, along with Cebu station. As a result, the station was relaunched as 90.3 Energy FM.
