= DXAC =

Radio station in Davao City, Philippines

Brigada News FM Davao (DXAC)
- Davao City; Philippines
- Broadcast area: Metro Davao and surrounding areas
- Frequency: 93.1 MHz
- RDS: BRIGADA
- Branding: 93.1 Brigada News FM

Programming
- Languages: Cebuano, Filipino
- Format: Contemporary MOR, News, Talk
- Network: Brigada News FM

Ownership
- Owner: Mareco Broadcasting Network
- Operator: Brigada Mass Media Corporation

History
- First air date: 1997
- Former call signs: DXVR (1997–2003)
- Former names: Crossover (1997–2020); Q Radio (2020–2023)
- Call sign meaning: Adult Contemporary (former radio format)

Technical information
- Licensing authority: NTC
- Power: 10,000 watts
- ERP: 30,000 watts
- Repeater: Digos: DXGJ 90.3 MHz

Links
- Webcast: Live Stream
- Website: brigadanews.ph 93.1 Brigada News FM - Davao FB Page

DXAC (93.1 FM), broadcasting as 93.1 Brigada News FM, is a radio station owned by Mareco Broadcasting Network and operated by Brigada Mass Media Corporation. The station's studio is located at the 3rd Floor, ECI Bldg., McArthur Highway, Ulas, Brgy. Talomo, Davao City, while its transmitter is located along Broadcast Ave., Shrine Hills, Matina, Davao City.

== History ==
=== 1997-2020: Crossover ===
Crossover (1997–2020).

The station was established in 1997 as 93.1 Crossover under the call letters DXVR, airing a Smooth AC format. At that time, it was formerly owned by Golden Broadcast Professionals, with Mareco Broadcasting Network operating the station through an airtime lease. In 2003, it changed its call letters to DXAC. By the late 2000s, MBNI fully acquired the station. In 2016, the station moved from F. Valrose Bldg. along C. M. Recto St. to its current home in Shrine Hills.

=== 2020-2023: Q Radio ===
On December 31, 2019, Horizon of the Sun Communications (producers of Chinatown TV and Chinese News TV) took over the operations of MBNI's stations. It was only on November 16, 2020, when all MBNI provincial stations started carrying the Q Radio brand and adopted a CHR/Top 40 format, similar to its Manila flagship station.

On June 19, 2023, Q Radio announced on its social media pages and livestream that the station will permanently go off the air due to financial problems. On June 30, Q Radio had its last broadcast.

=== 2023-present: Brigada News FM ===
On June 27, 2023, Brigada Mass Media Corporation (BMMC) signed an agreement with Mareco, in which it would lease the station's airtime along with other Mareco stations in Manila, Baguio, and Cebu. On July 1, it went back on the air, this time as a relay station of 105.1 Brigada News FM in Manila. A couple of days later, it switched to automated music under the interim name News FM.

On January 15, 2024, it started simulcasting 91.5 FM with the tagline Inyong Istasyon, Among Inspirasyon as part of its transition ahead of the expiration of Brigada's incumbent lease with the latter frequency.

On March 17, 2024, in celebration of the 87th Araw ng Dabaw, Brigada News FM Davao began broadcasting on this frequency full-time. Meanwhile, its former frequency was retained as a repeater until it went off the air on April 15.

Brigada News FM Davao was officially re-launched on April 15 with a motorcade at selected streets in Davao and on the same day, a grand launch concert was held at NCCC Mall VP.
