= DWET =

DWET may refer to:

- DWET-AM, an AM radio station broadcasting in Santiago, Isabela, branded as Life Radio
- DWET-FM, an FM radio station broadcasting in Metro Manila, branded as 106.7 Energy FM
- DWET-TV, television, channel 5, in Metro Manila, branded as TV5
