= Mareco Broadcasting Network =

Radio network in the Philippines

Mareco Broadcasting Network, Inc. (MBNI)
- Type: Private
- Industry: Radio broadcasting
- Founded: 1963
- Headquarters: Quezon City, Philippines
- Key people: Louie R. Villar, Jr. (President); Saripaz Villar-Tan (EVP); Elaine Rojas Villar-Rivilla (VP-Finance); Engr. Eleuterio "Terry" G. Bondoc (VP-Engineering)
- Parent: Mareco, Inc. (L.R. Villar Group of Companies)

Mareco Broadcasting Network, Inc. is a radio network in the Philippines. Mareco stands for Mabuhay Records Corporation as its parent company also owns Villar Records and Mabuhay Records. Its headquarters is located at #6 Tirad Pass Street, Sta. Mesa Heights, Quezon City. Aside from owning stations, Mareco also provides management and marketing consultancy for various radio companies in the country.

== History ==
Manuel P. Villar Sr., owner of Mareco Broadcasting Network, Inc., was also the executive of radio network's mother company, Mabuhay Records Corporation (Mareco, Inc.), and Filipinas Record Corp. Mareco owned one of the leading local record labels which, by late 1960s, were among those dominating almost all foreign labels that owned almost the entire market.

The Villar clan, which pioneered the country's recording business in 1950 through Mareco, opened two AM radio stations: DZBM 740 in 1963, and DZLM 1430. The group acquired an FM radio station in 1971. Upon the declaration of nationwide martial law in 1972, a decree was issued ordering a broadcast company to operate an AM and an FM station in each area. As a result, DZBM was kept, while DZLM was transferred to FM, later called DWLM 105.1. The family eventually focused on broadcast operations when they stopped recording business in the late 1970s.

These radio stations mostly played foreign records yet a local recording once daily, all requested by the listeners in early years. DZBM had the magazine-type format until the management later adopted the one with different announcing style, the first AM station to reformat into such; thus becoming the top-rated pop station for at least five to six years. Among those DJs at that time were the late Angelo Castro and Howard Medina, now with DZBB-AM. Villar Records, then country's leading biggest record company and the licensee of foreign labels including RCA, Columbia and Motown, once promoted its star balladeer to play alongside foreign pop stars on that station. DZBM's frequency was moved to 774 kHz by 1978.

In early 1990s, DWBM-FM and DWOO-AM (successors of DWLM-FM and DZBM-AM, respectively), along with Citylite 88.3 Metro Manila and its partner, DYBW-FM 89.1 Cebu City, became CNN radio affiliates, relaying international news reported by the outlet.

In May 1993, MBNI, owned by Palma and Villar group of companies at that time, relaunched DWOO-AM as news radio station.

In 1994, Luis Villar sold the shares to his children; the FM station went to his son, Louie, who introduced Crossover stations since then. The Villars later explained that the name describes its format: a combination of jazz, Latin, R&B and pop music. Four additional stations were later established nationwide.

On the other hand, the AM station, as DWAT, went to the Palmas and later brought by businessman Lucio Tan, while its franchise was still being held by the MBNI. The transfer to the latter was the subject of a dispute when the Villar family filed a court case against Tan, which caused the delay of station's scheduled official broadcast as DWWW 774 in October 1996, under new management. The station is currently operated by Interactive Broadcast Media.

On August 8, 2019, Philippine President Rodrigo Duterte signed Republic Act No. 11367 to the renewed Mareco Broadcasting Network, Inc., An act renewing for another Twenty-five (25) years the franchise granted to MBNI a franchise to construct, maintain and operate radio broadcasting and television stations in the Philippines.

On December 30, 2019, Horizon of the Sun Communications (producer of Chinese Filipino oriented shows Chinatown TV and Chinese News TV on IBC 13) took over the station's operations. The Q Radio branding was launched on January 13, 2020. Meanwhile, its provincial stations started carrying the said brand on November 16, 2020.

On July 1, 2023, Q Radio permanently went off-air due to financial problems. A few days prior, Brigada Mass Media Corporation signed an agreement with Mareco, in which it will lease the stations, except for the Bacolod station, whose operations were taken over by RYU Group of Companies.

== MBNI stations ==
=== Radio stations ===
Branding	Callsign	Frequency	Coverage	Operator
Brigada News FM Manila	DWBM-FM	105.1 MHz	Metro Manila	Brigada Mass Media Corporation
Brigada News FM Cebu	DYAC-FM	90.7 MHz	Cebu	Brigada Mass Media Corporation
Brigada News FM Davao	DXAC-FM	93.1 MHz	Davao	Brigada Mass Media Corporation
Prime 99.1	DYBM-FM	99.1 MHz	Bacolod	RYU Group of Companies

=== Former stations ===
Callsign	Frequency	Location	Notes
DWAT	774 kHz	Metro Manila	Acquired by Interactive Broadcast Media in 1996. Currently broadcasting as DWWW.
DZBM	105.1 MHz	Baguio	Acquired by Baycomms Broadcasting Corporation in late 2024. Currently a relay of Manila-based DWBM-FM.

=== Defunct TV stations ===
Callsign	Ch. #	Location	Fate
DWBM-TV	TV-43	Metro Manila	Frequency acquired by AMCARA Broadcasting Network and was later used by ABS-CBN for their DTT broadcast until June 30, 2020. This frequency is also previously used by Sonshine Media Network International for their DTT broadcast assigned by the National Telecommunications Commission since January 5, 2022 until its demise on December 19, 2023.
DYBM-TV	TV-45	Cebu	

== Crossover Radio Online ==
Crossover Radio Online
- Philippines
- Broadcast area: Worldwide via internet

Programming
- Format: Smooth AC
- Affiliations: BBC World Service; Voice of America

History
- First air date: June 1994
- Last air date: ca. 2025
- Former frequencies: Mega Manila, Baguio: 105.1 MHz (June 1994–December 29, 2019); Bacolod: 99.1 MHz; Cebu: 90.7 MHz; Davao: 93.1 MHz

Technical information
- Class: A, B and C

Links
- Webcast: Listen Live (Playlist)
- Website: www.crossoverradioonline.com (dead link as of May 2026)

Crossover (later known as Crossover Radio Online) was a smooth jazz/adult contemporary radio brand of Mareco Broadcasting Network. It began its broadcast on terrestrial in 1994, and officially migrated to digital-only via internet radio on December 30, 2019.

Much like its previous broadcast on FM, it still carries the same programming and international news bulletins from BBC World Service and Voice of America. As of 2025, the online radio station is inactive.

=== Profile ===
In the early 1990s, Mareco underwent several changes in management and programming, which also involves relaunching in 1991 of 105.1 Manila as DWBM-FM, until the launch of Crossover network through that station in (June) 1994.

The network was later expanded with the establishment of four additional stations: in Bacolod (99.1 FM, in February 1997), Cebu City (93.1 FM, in September of the same year; later moved to 90.7 FM), Davao City (93.1 FM, in June 1999), and Baguio (105.1 FM, in 2000) which is a relay.

On December 30, 2019, Crossover began its transition into a digital-only internet station, as Mareco began to lease airtime of its FM stations to third-party companies.

Its format being described by the station's name, a combination of variety of music including jazz and R&B music, as well as its affiliation with BBC World Service. The station, pre-transition, was the country's first CNN radio affiliate.

Crossover Radio Online also broadcast via live streaming on its mobile application available on iOS and Android.

The online radio station went inactive in 2025.
