= DYUB =

Radio station in the Philippines

Energy FM Kalibo (DYUB)
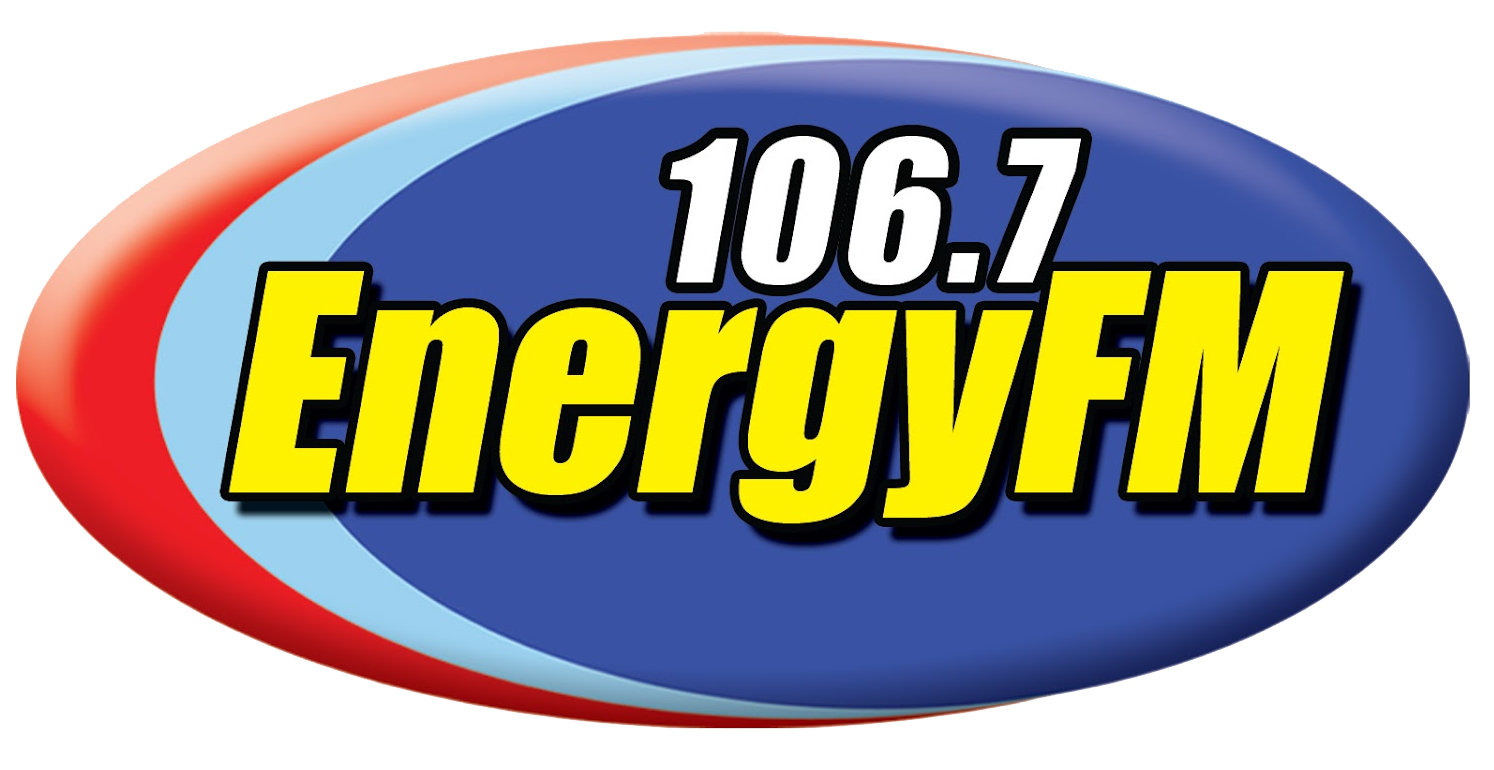
- Kalibo; Philippines
- Broadcast area: Aklan, parts of Antique and Capiz
- Frequency: 107.7 MHz
- Branding: 107.7 Energy FM

Programming
- Languages: Akeanon, Filipino
- Format: Contemporary MOR, News, Talk
- Network: Energy FM

Ownership
- Owner: Ultrasonic Broadcasting System
- Operator: Media Z Network Management and Marketing

History
- First air date: 2010
- Former names: Bay Radio
- Call sign meaning: Ultrasonic Broadcasting

Technical information
- Licensing authority: NTC
- Power: 5,000 watts

Links
- Website: http://energyfmkalibo.blogspot.com/

DYUB (107.7 FM), broadcasting as 107.7 Energy FM, is a radio station owned by Ultrasonic Broadcasting System and operated by Media Z Network Management and Marketing. Its studios are located at the 3rd floor, ACP Center Bldg., Acevedo St. cor. Roxas Ave., Brgy. Poblacion, Kalibo.

== History ==
It started operations in 2010 as Bay Radio under Baycomms and was later on known as Kasimanwa Radyo. In 2013, UBSI acquired the station and rebranded it as Energy FM. It initially simulcasted most of its flagship Manila station's programs until around 2016, when it started producing its own programs.
