= Dream FM Network =

Defunct Philippine radio network

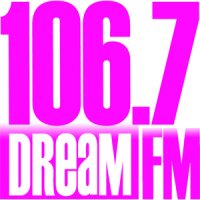
- Broadcast area: Nationwide

Programming
- Language: English
- Format: Smooth AC

Ownership
- Owner: ABC Development Corporation (2004–2010); Interactive Broadcast Media (2010–2011)
- Key people: Antonio O. Cojuangco Jr.; Robyn Narciso; Anton Lagdameo

History
- Founded: 2004
- Launch date: September 27, 2004
- Closed: June 30, 2011

Dream FM Network was a radio network in the Philippines. It was founded on September 27, 2004, as a radio arm of ABC Development Corporation.

== History ==
When the Associated Broadcasting Company was reopened in February 1992, it launched Kool 106, and has since began expanding in key cities of the country while undergoing format changes throughout its run.

On September 27, 2004, 11 months after business tycoon Tonyboy Cojuangco took over the management of ABC, its radio stations were relaunched as Dream FM. The station aired in a smooth jazz format added up with R&B, soul, bossa nova and house music. The station branding was named after Dream Satellite TV, also owned by Cojuangco.

In March 2010, PLDT's media subsidiary MediaQuest Holdings, Inc. acquired TV5 and its television stations from the consortium led by the Cojuangco group and Malaysian media conglomerate Media Prima Berhad. ABC's radio stations, which were not part of the deal, paved the way for the formation of Dream FM Network, led by former ABC stockholder Anton Lagdameo. The ownership of the stations were later transferred to Interactive Broadcast Media, which Cojuangco acquired a non-controlling share.

Dream FM Manila signed off on June 30, 2011, with the song, "Till We Meet Again" by Eric Benét. Its provincial stations went off the air a month prior. In August 2011, it resumed its broadcast online through Hayag, but ceased its broadcast a few months later.

On July 1, 2011, Energy FM Manila went back on terrestrial air via 106.7 FM. It was formerly on 91.5 FM from its inception in 2003 until May 31, 2011. The station was initially referred to as "Energy FM on Dream".

In September 2011, Dream FM Boracay was relaunched as Boracay Beach Radio. Though it is described as a "part of the Dream FM Network" on its website, the station is run by the former Dream FM staff.

On October 28, 2024, True FM Davao transferred to 106.7 FM from its former frequency, which was acquired by PCMC. This eventually became part of the True Network of TV5 Network.

== Stations ==
=== Current ===
Branding	Callsign	Frequency	Location
Boracay Beach Radio	DYKP	97.3 MHz	Boracay

=== Former ===
Callsign	Frequency	Location	Status
DWET-FM	106.7 MHz	Metro Manila	Currently operated by Ultrasonic Broadcasting System under the Energy FM network.
DWTE-FM	106.7 MHz	Laoag	Currently off the air.
DXET-FM	106.7 MHz	Davao	Currently operated by TV5 Network Inc. under the True FM network.
DXER-FM	93.5 MHz	General Santos	Currently operated by Gev Advertisement Marketing as Parekoy Radio.
