= DXNV =

Defunct radio station in General Santos, Philippines

- General Santos; Philippines
- Broadcast area: South Cotabato, Sarangani and surrounding areas
- Frequency: 107.9 MHz

Programming
- Format: Silent

Ownership
- Owner: Progressive Broadcasting Corporation

History
- First air date: 1992
- Last air date: December 31, 2013
- Call sign meaning: Pronounced as "new" (former branding)

Technical information
- Licensing authority: NTC

DXNV (107.9 FM) was a radio station owned and operated by Progressive Broadcasting Corporation. It formerly served as a relay station of DWNU in Manila from 1992 to December 31, 2013, when it went off the air. The frequency is currently assigned to the Mabuhay Broadcasting System.
