= NU 107 Cebu =

NU107.COM CO.
Cebu City; Philippines
- Broadcast area: Worldwide via internet
- Branding: NU 107

Programming
- Format: Alternative, Rock

Ownership
- Owner: NU107.COM CO.

History
- First air date: 1992
- Former frequencies: 107.5 MHz (1992–2011)
- Call sign meaning: NU (pronounced as new) (Now Underground)

Technical information
- Power: 15,000 watts

Links
- Website: www.nu107rock.com

NU 107 Cebu is a defunct FM station of Progressive Broadcasting Corporation and current internet radio station in the Philippines. The station's studio & transmitter is located at Labangon, Cebu City.

== See also ==
- DYNU-FM, the radio station resulting from the reformat of NU 107 Cebu|
- NU 107
- DWAO-TV
- NU Rock Awards
