= DXUB =

Energy FM Kidapawan (DXUB)
- Kidapawan; Philippines
- Broadcast area: Eastern Cotabato and surrounding areas
- Frequency: 99.1 MHz
- Branding: 99.1 Energy FM

Programming
- Languages: Cebuano, Filipino
- Format: Contemporary MOR, OPM
- Network: Energy FM

Ownership
- Owner: Ultrasonic Broadcasting System
- Operator: Kidapawan Doctors Broadcasting and Multimedia Corporation

History
- First air date: November 30, 2013
- Call sign meaning: Ultrasonic Broadcasting System

Technical information
- Licensing authority: NTC
- Power: 5 kW

99.1 Energy FM (DXUB 99.1 MHz) is an FM station owned by Ultrasonic Broadcasting System and operated by Kidapawan Doctors Broadcasting and Multimedia Corporation. Its studios and transmitter are located at Brgy. Manongol, Kidapawan.
