= DWBQ =

Radio station in Naga, Camarines Sur, Philippines

Energy FM Naga (DWBQ)
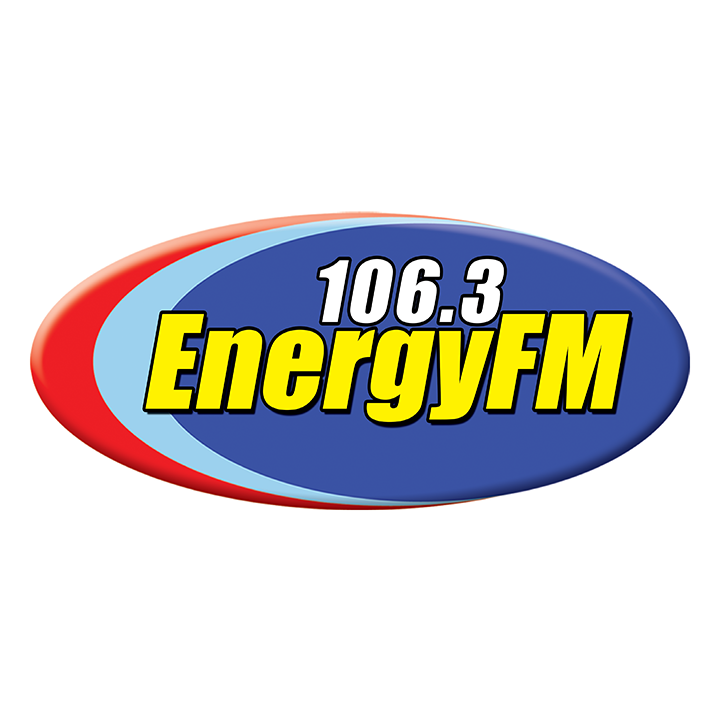

Naga; Philippines
- Broadcast area: Camarines Sur and surrounding areas
- Frequency: 106.3 MHz
- Branding: 106.3 Energy FM

Programming
- Languages: Bicolano, Filipino
- Format: Contemporary MOR, OPM
- Network: Energy FM

Ownership
- Owner: Ultrasonic Broadcasting System, Inc.

History
- First air date: 1999

Technical information
- Licensing authority: NTC
- Power: 10,000 watts

DWBQ (106.3 FM), broadcasting as 106.3 Energy FM, is a radio station owned and operated by Ultrasonic Broadcasting System. The station's studio is located at 3/F Traders Square Bldg., P. Burgos St., Naga, Camarines Sur.
