= Marian Radio =

Radio station in Cagayan de Oro, Philippines

- Cagayan de Oro; Philippines
- Broadcast area: Misamis Oriental, parts of Lanao del Norte and Bukidnon
- Frequency: 91.9 MHz
- Branding: 91.9 Marian Radio

Programming
- Languages: Cebuano, Filipino, English
- Format: Religious Radio
- Affiliations: Catholic Media Network

Ownership
- Owner: Archdiocese of Cagayan de Oro; (Catholic Bishops Conference of the Philippines)

History
- First air date: October 7, 2016
- Former call signs: Under ABS-CBN: DXEC (1993-2020)
- Former frequencies: Under Marian Radio: 107.9 MHz (2016–2017); 103.9 MHz (2017–2024)

Technical information
- Licensing authority: NTC
- Power: 10,000 watts

91.9 Marian Radio (91.9 FM) is a radio station owned and operated by the Archdiocese of Cagayan de Oro (formerly Birhen Sa Kota Broadcasting). The station's studio and transmitter is located at Saint Augustine Metropolitan Cathedral, Brgy. 1, Cagayan de Oro.

== History ==
Marian Radio had its test broadcast on 107.9 FM from October 2016 to January 2017, when it transferred to Fairwaves Broadcasting Network-owned 103.9 FM. It was launched a few months later. As part of the local marketing agreement with the said company, it was an affiliate of Radyo Bandera for its news and talk programming from 2018 to December 31, 2022, when it went off the air. Fairwaves' franchise expired two years prior.

In late January 2023, it went back on air solely under the Archdiocese of Cagayan de Oro. In May the following year, Radyo Bandera was relaunched, this time on 89.3 FM under 5K Broadcasting Network.

In December 2024, it moved its frequency to 91.9 FM which was formerly owned by ABS-CBN Corporation under the My Only Radio network.
