= DYBM =

Radio station in Bacolod, Philippines

Prime 99.1 (DYBM)
- Bacolod; Philippines
- Broadcast area: Northern Negros Island, parts of Iloilo and Guimaras
- Frequency: 99.1 MHz
- RDS: Prime 99.1
- Branding: Prime 99.1

Programming
- Language: English
- Format: Adult hits, News, Talk

Ownership
- Owner: Mareco Broadcasting Network
- Operator: RYU Group of Companies

History
- First air date: February 1997
- Former names: Crossover (1997–2020); Q Radio (2020–2023); Yuhum Radio (2023-2026)
- Call sign meaning: Best Music (former slogan)

Technical information
- Licensing authority: NTC
- Power: 5,000 watts
- HAAT: 37 Meters (Local Height)

DYBM (99.1 FM), broadcasting as Prime 99.1, is a radio station owned by Mareco Broadcasting Network and operated by RYU Group of Companies. The station's studio and transmitter are located at GM Cordova Ave., Brgy. Mandalangan, Bacolod.

== History ==
Crossover (1997–2019).

The station was established in February 1997 as the first provincial Crossover. It had its inaugural broadcast on June 5. The station, then located at Mountain View Subdivision, Mandalagan District, was staffed by seven disc jockeys. Similar to its flagship station in Manila, it aired a smooth jazz format with a blend of pop-jazz and R&B, and aired hourly international news from CNN.

On November 16, 2020, the station, along with other MBNI provincial stations, started carrying the Q Radio brand and switched to a CHR/Top 40 format. Prior to the reformat, Horizon of the Sun Communications (producers of Chinatown TV) took over the operations of the Manila flagship station at the end of 2019.

On June 19, 2023, Q Radio announced on its social media pages and livestream that the station will permanently go off-air on July 1, 2023 due to financial problems.

Earlier that month, RYU Group of Companies of Ramel Uy took over the station's operations. On August 13, 2023, the station began its test broadcast as Yuhum Radio with a mass-based format. It is the only Mareco-owned FM station that was not included in the lease blocktime agreement with Brigada Mass Media Corporation, which owns and operates 103.1 FM in the same city.

On November 4, 2025, Yuhum Radio went off the air after its transmitter was heavily damaged by Typhoon "Kalmaegi" (Tino).

In August 2026, it went back on air with the slogan "Bring Back The Smile". The following month, it rebranded as Prime 99.1. It is currently on test broadcast.
