= DWWW =

Radio station in Metro Manila, Philippines

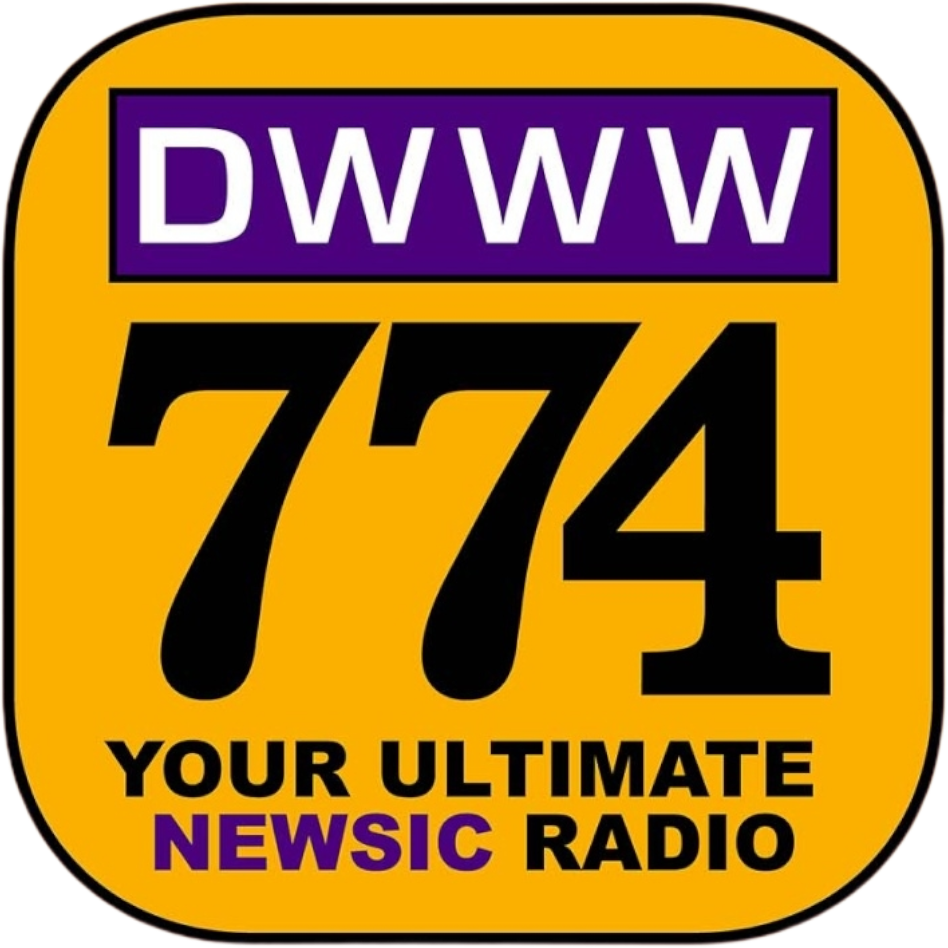
- San Juan; Philippines
- Broadcast area: Mega Manila and surrounding areas
- Frequency: 774 kHz
- Branding: DWWW 774

Programming
- Language: Filipino
- Format: Oldies, News, Talk
- Affiliations: RMN Networks

Ownership
- Owner: Interactive Broadcast Media, Inc.
- Sister stations: 106.7 Energy FM

History
- First air date: 1963
- Former call signs: DZBM (1963–1972, 1973–1987); DZLM (1963–1972); DWOO (1973–1979); DWAT (1987–1996)
- Former frequencies: DZBM/DWAT: 740 kHz (1963–1972, 1973–1978); DZLM/DWOO: 1430 kHz (1963–1972, 1973–1978)

Technical information
- Licensing authority: NTC
- Class: A
- Power: 25,000 watts
- Repeater: Dagupan: DWHT 107.9 MHz

Links
- Webcast: DWWW on TuneIn DWWW on Ustream
- Website: 774DWWW.ph

DWWW (774 AM) is a C-QUAM radio station owned and operated by Interactive Broadcast Media. The studio is located at the RMN Broadcast Center, Unit 808, 8th Floor, Atlanta Centre, Annapolis St., Greenhills, San Juan, Metro Manila, while its transmitter is located along Tagalag Road, Brgy. Tagalag, Valenzuela.

As of Q4 2022, DWWW is the 3rd most-listened to AM radio station in Metro Manila, based on a survey commissioned by Kantar Media Philippines and Kapisanan ng mga Brodkaster ng Pilipinas.

== History ==
=== 1963–1996: DZBM/DWOO/DWAT ===
The station's predecessor, DZBM 740, was established in 1963 by Mareco Broadcasting Network of Manuel P. Villar Sr., being one of the network's first AM radio stations along with DZLM 1430. Both stations were used to promote Mareco's record labels. They mostly played foreign records yet a local recording once daily, all requested by the listeners in later years.

With a decree issued upon the declaration of nationwide martial law in 1972, the company decided to keep DZBM in AM and transfer another to FM as DWBM 105.1, which remained to the Villars until being known as Crossover since 1994. The station is currently operated by Brigada Mass Media Corporation as 105.1 Brigada News FM Manila.

DZBM had the magazine-type format until the management later adopted the one with different announcing style, the first AM station to reformat into such; thus becoming the top-rated pop station for at least five to six years. Among the station's personalities at that time were the late Angelo Castro and Howard Medina. Villar Records, then country's leading biggest record company and the licensee of foreign labels, once promoted its star balladeer to play alongside foreign pop stars on the station.

In 1978, its frequency was changed to 774 kHz in response to the adoption of the 9-kHz spacing on AM radio stations in the Philippines. At the same time, it switched to a news & talk format.

The station, as DWOO-AM, along with its sister station, became a CNN radio affiliate in early 1990s; the first for the country's AM radio stations.

In May 1993, MBNI, owned by Palma and Villar group of companies at that time, relaunched DWOO-AM as news radio station.

The AM station, as DWAT, was bought from the Villars by the Palmas and later by businessman Lucio Tan. The transfer to the latter was the subject of a dispute when the Villar family later filed a court case against Tan. While MBNI was still being the station's licensee during these transfers, the station was later operated by Interactive Broadcast Media, Inc. prior to having the franchise granted by the Congress in 1996. Since its relaunch in 1994, it served as the first station of veteran broadcasters, Fernan Gulapa, Willie Delgado, and Cito Beltran, son of the late Louie Beltran.

=== 1996–2011: DWWW ===
While the dispute was ongoing, the scheduled official broadcast on October 25, 1996 was delayed until the station eventually aired as DWWW 774 on October 31 under the management of broadcast veteran Rene Palma and businessman Roberto Bacsal, owners of IBMI. The station took the slot left by DWAT; the current callsign was formerly used by the flagship station of Radio Philippines Network until 1986 when the government returned its frequency to ABS-CBN, which in turn revived their station as DZMM.

Its studios were moved to #23 E. Rodriguez Sr. Ave. in Quezon City. The station airs oldies, covering music from the 50s to 80s in the afternoon and evening slots, while morning and late afternoon slots were allotted for news and public affairs programs. In a few months, it rose to the #4 spot in the Mega Manila AM ratings and carved a strong niche against rival stations. Back then, the station operated for 21 hours from Monday to Saturdays, and 20 hours on Sundays.

DWWW also introduced the Broadkast Patrol reportorial team for news. Aside from Gulapa and Beltran, other personalities were part of the station's early years are Lito Villarosa, Jun Taña, Bobby Guanzon, Vic Morales and Joey Collantes. Jun Ricafrente of DZMM served as head of the news service in the 90s.

=== 2011–present: Expansion and Dominance ===
Under new ownership and management, DWWW was relaunched on November 2, 2011, in its new home in Atlanta Center, Greenhills, San Juan City, Metro Manila and expanded its broadcast hours to 24/7. The station's music library was overhauled and reorganized. The nomenclature of the station's identification changed from "Siete siete cuatro/siyete siyete kwatro" to "Seven seven four." The new tagline "The Music of Your Life" was also launched to highlight the dominant ratings of DWWW's music format. Since then, it became an affiliate station of RMN Networks.

In 2014, the tagline was changed to "Your Ultimate AM Radio" to showcase DWWW's competitive news, commentary, and public service programs, aside from music and entertainment. Such ongoing dominance prompted the station to change the tag to "Your Ultimate Newsic Radio" in mid-2018, a year after the relaunch of its Broadkast Patrol division.

DWWW was relaunched on September 8, 2019, during the Grandparents' Day event at the Farmers Plaza, Araneta Center. The station identification's nomenclature reverted to Tagalog naming "siyete siyete kwatro", though the English naming is still heard only on some plugs prior to this.

On July 1, 2024, DWWW launched its relay affiliate in Dagupan via DWHT 107.9 FM. It is owned by Broadcast Enterprises and Affiliated Media, which RMN sold its stake to Globe Telecom's media arm Bethlehem Holdings in 2009.
