= DXNY-FM =

Radio station in Cagayan de Oro, Philippines

Win Radio Cagayan de Oro (DXNY)
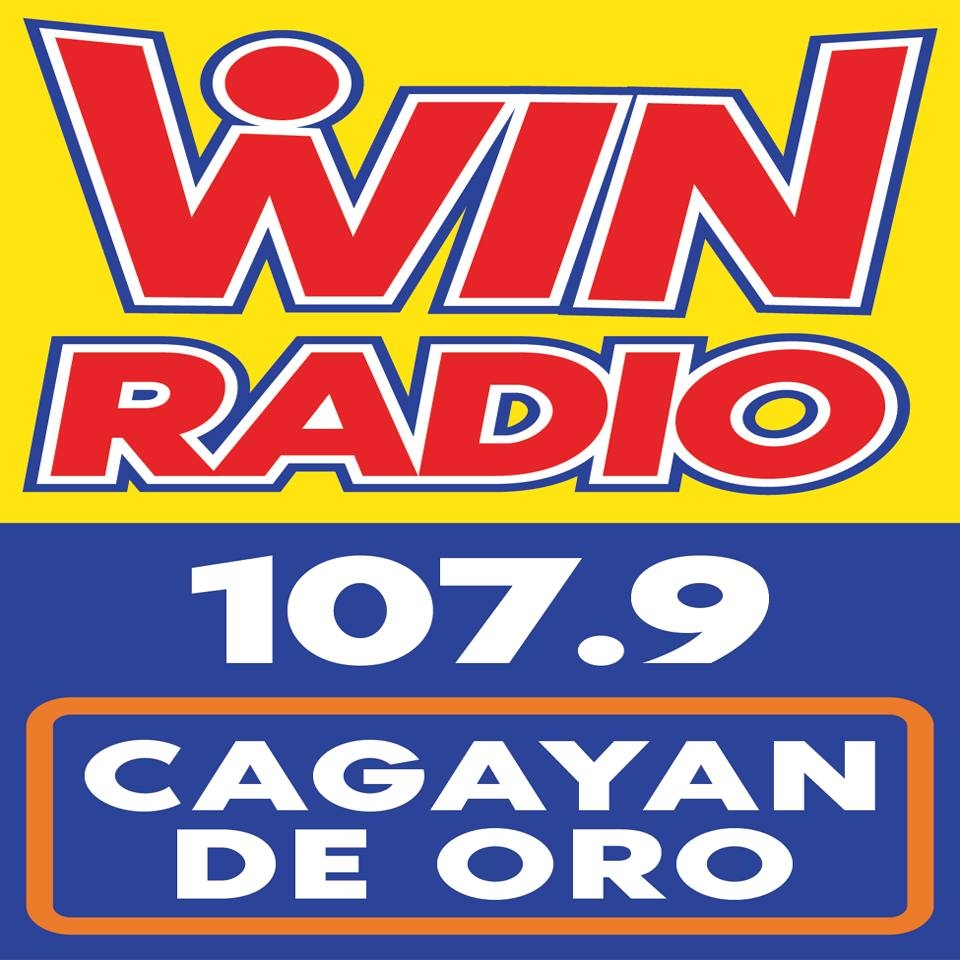
- Cagayan de Oro; Philippines
- Broadcast area: Misamis Oriental, parts of Lanao del Norte and Bukidnon
- Frequency: 107.9 MHz
- Branding: 107.9 Win Radio

Programming
- Languages: Cebuano, Filipino
- Format: Contemporary MOR, OPM
- Network: Win Radio

Ownership
- Owner: Mabuhay Broadcasting System
- Operator: ZimZam Management, Inc.

History
- First air date: 1995
- Former names: DWNU Manila relay (1995–2006, 2010–2013); Mom's Radio (2006–2010); Marian Radio (2016–2017)
- Call sign meaning: Variant of DXNU

Technical information
- Licensing authority: NTC
- Class: B C D
- Power: 10,000 watts
- ERP: 30,000 watts

Links
- Website: http://www.winradio.com.ph

DXNY (107.9 FM), broadcasting as 107.9 Win Radio, is a radio station owned by Mabuhay Broadcasting System and operated by ZimZam Management, Inc. The station's studio and transmitter are located at Pryce Plaza Hotel, Carmen Hills, Cagayan de Oro.

== History ==
The station began operations in 1995 under the ownership of Progressive Broadcasting Corporation as a relay station of DWNU in Manila. In 2006, Southern Broadcasting Network took over the station's operations and rebranded as Mom's Radio. In 2010, after SBN's agreement with the station expired, it went back as a relay station of DWNU. It went off the air in 2013.

In 2016, after House Bill No. 5982 was passed into law, Mabuhay Broadcasting System acquired the provincial stations of PBC. Marian Radio utilized this frequency from October 2016 to January 2017, when it transferred to 103.9 FM. In January 2017, the station went back on air, this time as an originating station of the Win Radio network.
