= DYLL-FM =

Radio station in Cebu City, Philippines

Energy FM Cebu (DYLL)
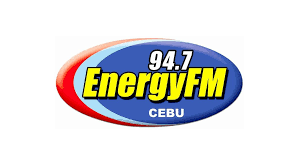
- Cebu City; Philippines
- Broadcast area: Metro Cebu and surrounding areas
- Frequency: 94.7 MHz
- Branding: 94.7 Energy FM

Programming
- Languages: Cebuano, Filipino
- Format: Contemporary MOR, OPM
- Network: Energy FM

Ownership
- Owner: Ultrasonic Broadcasting System

History
- First air date: 1992
- Former call signs: Energy FM: DYAC (1998–2003); DYDW (2003–2004)
- Former names: Mellow Touch (1992-2003)
- Former frequencies: Energy FM: 90.7 MHz (1998–2003); 89.1 MHz (2003–2004)
- Call sign meaning: Luis and Leonida Vera (original owners)

Technical information
- Licensing authority: NTC
- Power: 20,000 watts
- ERP: 60,000 watts

Links
- Webcast: Listen Live via (AMFMPH)

DYLL (94.7 FM), broadcasting as 94.7 Energy FM, is a radio station owned and operated by Ultrasonic Broadcasting System. The station's studio is located at the 3rd Floor, Gallardo Bldg., Gen. Maxilom Ave., cor. Filimon Sotto Drive., Cebu City, and its transmitter is located at BSP Camp, Capitol Hills, Brgy. Lahug, Cebu City.

== History ==
The station was established in 1992 under the ownership of FBS Radio Network. At that time, it was known as Mellow Touch 94.7 with an easy listening format. In 2003, it went off the air after the station building caught fire, damaging the station's equipment, transmitter, and studio.

On April 12, 2004, UBSI acquired the station from FBS in exchange of selling its AM station in Mega Manila to the latter and moved Energy FM's operations to the said frequency. It transferred its studios to BSP Camp along Capitol Hills. Prior to its move, Energy FM was previously on 90.7 FM from 1998 to 2003 and 89.1 FM from 2003 to 2004; both under airtime lease.

In 2009, Energy FM Cebu won the "People's Choice" Award for Cebu FM Radio in the 18th KBP Golden Dove Awards.

In 2014, the station transferred to its current home at Gallardo Bldg. in Gen. Maxilom Ave., the former home of DYRF and DYDW.
