= DYNY-TV =

DYNY-TV (UNTV-42 Iloilo)

Iloilo City; Philippines
- Channels: Analog: (UHF) (NTSC-M); Digital: (UHF) (ISDB-T)
- Branding: UNTV 42 Iloilo

Programming
- Affiliations: UNTV 37

Ownership
- Owner: Information Broadcast Unlimited
- Operator: Breakthrough and Milestones Productions International

History
- Founded: August 2000 (as NUTV Channel 42); July 16, 2001 (as UNTV-42); May 2002 (as UNTV) (re-launched July 2004)
- Former call signs: NUTV-42
- Former channel numbers: Analog: 42 (UHF) (2000-2016)
- Former affiliations: NUTV Channel 42
- Call sign meaning: DYNY

Technical information
- ERP: 5 kilowatts

Links
- Website: www.untvweb.com

DYNY-TV channel 42 was a UHF television station owned by Information Broadcast Unlimited (IBU) and operated by Breakthrough and Milestones Productions International (BMPI), the network's content provider and marketing arm and Christian religious organization Members Church of God International (MCGI). The station's transmitter is located in Jordan, Guimaras with the power of 5,000 watts. This station was permanently off the air.
