= DYKP =

Radio station in Boracay, Philippines

Boracay Beach Radio (DYKP)
- Malay; Philippines
- Broadcast area: Boracay and surrounding areas
- Frequency: 97.3 MHz
- Branding: 97.3 Boracay Beach Radio

Programming
- Language: English
- Format: Smooth AC
- Network: Dream FM Network

Ownership
- Owner: Interactive Broadcast Media

History
- First air date: 1992 (in Roxas); 1998 (in Boracay); February 2010 (as Dream FM); September 2011 (as Boracay Beach Radio)
- Former frequencies: 89.7 MHz (1992–1994)

Technical information
- Licensing authority: NTC
- Class: A / B / C
- Power: 1,000 watts

Links
- Website: http://boracaybeachradio.com/

DYKP (97.3 FM), on-air as 97.3 Boracay Beach Radio, is a radio station owned and operated by Interactive Broadcast Media. It is the sole station under the Dream FM Network. The station's studios are located at the PhilFirst Building, Ayala Avenue, Makati, and its transmitter is located at Boracay Station 3, Malay, Aklan.

== History ==
The station was inaugurated in 1992 as KP-FM 89.7 under Westwind Broadcasting Corporation. At that time, it was located in Roxas, Capiz. In 1994, it moved its frequency from 89.7 FM to 97.3 FM. In 1998, it moved to Boracay & rebranded as B97 or Boracay 97. However, in 2000, it ceased broadcasting due to lack of advertisers.

In 2010, Interactive Broadcast Media acquired the station and relaunched it under the Dream FM Network. In July 2011, it went off the air. However, in September 2011, it returned on air, this time as Boracay Beach Radio. Its programs from Dream FM were carried to this station.

== See also ==
- Dream FM Network
