= DWET-FM =

Radio station in Metro Manila, Philippines

Energy FM Manila (DWET)
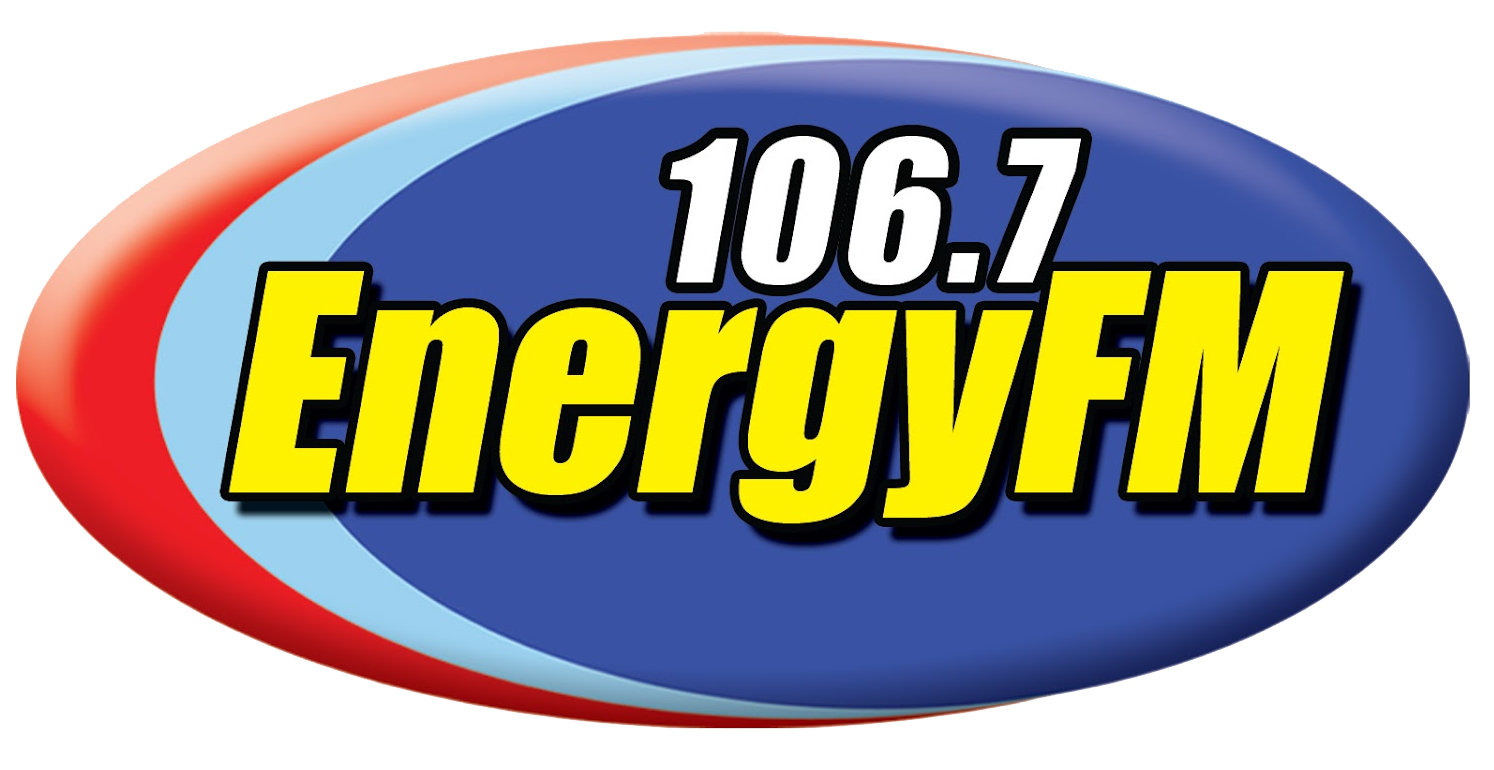
- San Juan; Philippines
- Broadcast area: Mega Manila and surrounding areas
- Frequency: 106.7 MHz
- RDS: ENERGYFM
- Branding: 106.7 Energy FM

Programming
- Language: Filipino
- Format: Contemporary MOR, OPM
- Network: Energy FM

Ownership
- Owner: Interactive Broadcast Media
- Operator: Ultrasonic Broadcasting System
- Sister stations: Through IBMI: DWWW

History
- First air date: February 21, 1992
- Former call signs: As Energy FM: DWKY (2003-2011)
- Former names: Kool (1992-2001, 2002-2004); Rio (2001-2002); Dream FM (2004-2011)
- Former frequencies: As Energy FM: 91.5 MHz (2003-2011)
- Call sign meaning: Edward Tan (former president of the Associated Broadcasting Company, deceased)

Technical information
- Licensing authority: NTC
- Class: C, D, E
- Power: 30,000 watts
- ERP: 60,000 watts

Links
- Webcast: Listen Live via eRadioPortal
- Website: Official Website

DWET (106.7 FM), on-air as 106.7 Energy FM, is a radio station owned by Interactive Broadcast Media and operated under an airtime lease agreement by Ultrasonic Broadcasting System. Its studios and offices are located at Unit A, 3rd Floor, E-Square Bldg., 416 Ortigas Ave., Brgy. Greenhills, San Juan, Metro Manila, while its transmitter is located at TV5 Complex, 762 Quirino Highway, Brgy. San Bartolome, Novaliches, Quezon City (sharing facilities with sister station TV5).

== History ==
=== 1992-2001: The first Kool ===
The station, along with ABC 5, first went on-air on February 21, 1992, as Kool 106. With radio veteran George Mercado (George Boone) at the helm, its aired a Hot AC format, playing a mix of Top 40 hits and music from the 70s and 80s. In 1995, when Marc Gorospe (currently program manager of DWAD 1098) assumed the Station Manager post, Kool 106 flipped into contemporary hit radio.

On March 15, 1999, it became 106.7 Kool and switched to an urban contemporary format. Kool signed off for the last time under its format on August 3, 2001.

=== 2001-2002: Rio ===
On September 1, 2001, It rebranded as Ritmo Latino Rio 106.7, the first radio station in the country that played Latin music.

=== 2002-2004: The second Kool ===
On April 1, 2002, Kool 106 resurrected as a mass-based station. During the relaunch, Kool 106 and ABC-5 teamed up to produce a 30-minute interactive music show called "Kool on Kam", originally aired as a hookup with Kool 106 where the jocks can now be seen on TV with music videos playing. On June 3, 2002, Kool on Kam moved to a primetime slot and its airtime was extended to a full hour. Aside from the show having its own segments, the jocks also interview the show's featured artist of the week. Kool on Kam lasted for a year and a half. The station also had its first ever separate countdown, where the top 10 OPM songs and top 10 foreign songs are aired at noontime and 6:00 pm respectively on Sundays. Kool 106 also had its "By Request" program, which aired weekdays from 9:00 pm to midnight, and all day Sundays where listeners can call and ask for their requested song. They made their final broadcast on July 31, 2004, where they bade farewell and gave thanks to their listeners for the past 12 years under the "Kool" branding.

On August 1, 2004, as part of its transition, the station began stunting by playing a mix of classic hits, smooth jazz and orchestra under the interim name ABC Radio.

=== 2004–2011: Dream FM ===
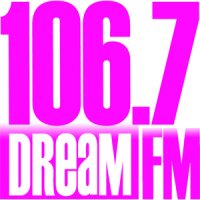
Dream FM logo

On September 27, 2004, 11 months after Tonyboy Cojuangco took over the management of ABC, the station was relaunched as 106.7 Dream FM. It aired a smooth jazz format, playing smooth jazz, R&B, Soul, Bossa Nova and House and carried the slogan Your Comfortable Choice. It was also home of Smooth Jazz Top 20 hosted by Allen Kepler and Turbo Time.

After PLDT's media subsidiary MediaQuest Holdings, Inc. acquired TV5 and its affiliate ABC television stations from the consortium led by the Cojuangco group and Malaysian media conglomerate Media Prima Berhad in March 2010, Dream FM and its regional stations were spun off to become Dream FM Network, led by former ABC stockholder Anton Lagdameo. The ownership of the stations were transferred to Interactive Broadcast Media, after Cojuangco acquired a non-controlling share of the company. The station continued to use TV5's Novaliches studios throughout the rest of Dream FM's run.

On June 30, 2011, Dream FM signed off for the last time with "Till We Meet Again" by Eric Benét as its swansong.

=== 2011-present: Energy FM ===
Throughout the last week of June, plugs were aired on 106.7 FM with the statement "Si Pangga, Dreaming!" (Pangga is Dreaming!), where the slogan of Energy FM ("Pangga"; it means friend in Hiligaynon) and Dream FM's name is used. It was later discovered that IBMI leased the station's airtime to Ultrasonic Broadcasting System, Inc., a broadcast entity managed by the SYSU Group of Companies (who also owns local distribution of several food and seasoning product brands as well as selling Christian-oriented products). Energy FM used to broadcast on 91.5 FM, owned by Mabuhay Broadcasting System, from 2003 until June 1, 2011, when it signed off and the frequency was taken over by Zimzam Management, owned by former UBSI general manager Manuelito "Manny" Luzon which also manages 107.5 Win Radio (now Wish 107.5).

On July 1, 2011, after a month of hiatus, Energy FM returned to terrestrial air on 106.7 FM as Energy FM on Dream 106.7. Its programs and DJs premiered on July 4. Kenji was the only Dream FM jock who joined the roster. Energy FM initially used Dream FM's former studios inside the TV5 complex in Novaliches. In August 2012, it transferred to Stata 2000 building in Ortigas. By this time, the station dropped Dream from its branding and adopted the secondary slogan "Ibang-iba ka, Pangga!".

Energy FM was credited as the 1st station to promote K-Pop in the Philippines, through its radio segment called KPOP Sarap. Initially an hourly segment of Ray Mambo's Radioactive Countdown, it expanded into a 2-hour segment. After Mambo left the station, it became a fully fledged KPOP-program. In 2017, it was axed to give way to Pinoy Playbor, an all-day Saturday music block which aired OPM.

On March 17, 2014, Energy FM launched its new tagline, "Ang Sarap! Ang Sharap!", inspired by photo sharing site Instagram. The new imaging, however, resulted to a different approach in its programming, as well as the dismissal of most of the station's veteran jocks, including Cathy G and DJ Mac, in place of a new batch of jocks. Marketing Consultant Joee "Brother Joe" Guilas aimed the station to serve its listeners with a new menu of fun and entertainment, which was never heard on radio before. The tagline proved to be unfamiliar with its listeners, prompting the station to re-adopt its old slogan several months later.

In May 2014, CJ Santos briefly joined the station as Prinsipe Pegasus to help promote Digmaan Lusob Mola.

On March 20, 2017, major changes occurred at the station as former 90.7 Love Radio DJ John Gemperle, who was known on the air as Papa Jack, joined the station as Papa J, which became Papa Jackson a month later. Mr. Fu monicker subsequently left the station and joined 91.5 Win Radio. On May 8, 2017, former Yes FM 101.1 and Tag 91.1 DJ Chico Loco also joined the station as Kuya Chico. Following significant listenership gains in the ratings, on October 29, 2018, Gemperle was promoted as Energy FM's station manager, a position he held until his resignation in October 2025.

On October 5, 2020, Energy FM transferred to the E-Square Building in nearby Greenhills, San Juan.

==== 2011-2017: Saved Radio ====
Energy FM was the first home station of Saved Radio which plays Christian music of praise and worship. Produced by Becca Music Inc., a Christian multimedia company founded by UBSI's chair Rebecca Sy, it first aired on February 6, 2011 (while Energy FM was still on 91.5 FM) as a Sunday evening program titled Saved on Energy FM and was initially aired between 9pm to 12mn. When the show transferred to DWET, it expanded into a four-hour radio show, then expanded to six hours a few months after. By 2014, Becca Music renamed the show as SAVED Radio on Energy FM, along with a refreshed lineup of programs for each hour including its known portion entitled "The Worship Hour". In mid-2015, SAVED Radio expanded its airtime to 18 hours on Sundays and introducing new programs with radio jocks hired separately from the Energy FM roster. Gaining positive feedback from its listeners, SAVED Radio finally became full-time a few weeks later, when it occupied the remaining Sunday airtime of Energy FM's programming. However, it continued to air as a blocktime show on Energy FM and not as a separate broadcaster nor airtime operator. Also, despite its expansion in Manila, SAVED Radio remained to be a late-night Sunday show on Energy FM's provincial stations.

On December 24, 2017, through Saved Radio's Facebook page, Becca Music announced that Saved Radio would temporarily leave the FM radio band after December 31. As a compromise, though, Becca Music sets up an exclusive daily online streaming service on the Saved Radio website to allow loyal listeners of the program to continue listening on contemporary Christian music. By New Year's Day 2018, Saved Radio converted into an online radio service; while Energy FM reoccupied the network's Sunday lineup, the first after two years. The online streaming service was shut down in mid-2024.

As of October 2024, the brand is currently owned by Christ's Heritage Church, a Quezon City-based Baptist congregation, as its digital media and podcast ministry under the Saved Media banner ― Becca Music transferred the brand's ownership to FEBC Philippines in 2022, before it transferred to CHC two years later. Becca Music, meanwhile, ended its operations in 2023.
