= DXDR-FM =

Radio station in Davao City, Philippines

Energy FM Davao (DXDR)
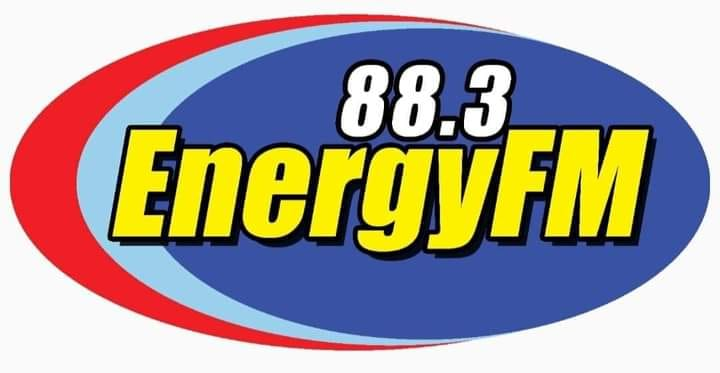
- Davao City; Philippines
- Broadcast area: Metro Davao and surrounding areas
- Frequency: 88.3 MHz
- Branding: 88.3 Energy FM

Programming
- Languages: Cebuano, Filipino
- Format: Contemporary MOR, OPM
- Network: Energy FM

Ownership
- Owner: Ultrasonic Broadcasting System

History
- First air date: 1995
- Call sign meaning: Davao Region

Technical information
- Licensing authority: NTC
- Power: 10,000 watts
- ERP: 30,000 watts

Links
- Website: 88.3 Energy FM

DXDR (88.3 FM), broadcasting as 88.3 Energy FM, is a radio station owned and operated by the Ultrasonic Broadcasting System. It serves as the flagship station of Energy FM. The station's studio and transmitter are located along Broadcast Ave., Shrine Hills, Matina, Davao City.
