= DXNW =

Radio station in Digos, Philippines

Energy FM Digos (DXNW)
- Digos; Philippines
- Broadcast area: Davao del Sur, parts of Davao City
- Frequency: 91.1 MHz
- Branding: 91.1 Energy FM

Programming
- Languages: Cebuano, Filipino
- Format: Contemporary MOR, News, Talk
- Network: Energy FM

Ownership
- Owner: Ultrasonic Broadcasting System
- Operator: NSR Broadcasting Promotion

History
- First air date: 2016

Technical information
- Licensing authority: NTC
- Power: 5 kW

91.1 Energy FM (DXNW 91.1 MHz) is an FM station owned by Ultrasonic Broadcasting System and operated under a shared services agreement by NSR Broadcasting Promotion. Its studios and transmitter are located along Lapu-Lapu St., Digos.
