= DXUA =

Energy FM Pagadian (DXUA)
Pagadian; Philippines
- Broadcast area: Zamboanga del Sur
- Frequency: 98.3 MHz
- Branding: 98.3 Energy FM

Programming
- Languages: Cebuano, Filipino
- Format: Contemporary MOR, OPM
- Network: Energy FM

Ownership
- Owner: Ultrasonic Broadcasting System
- Operator: Mindanao Broadcasting Network

History
- First air date: July 20, 2015
- Former names: RCFM (2015–2018)
- Call sign meaning: UltrAsonic

Technical information
- Licensing authority: NTC
- Power: 5 kW

98.3 Energy FM (DXUA 98.3 MHz) is an FM station owned by Ultrasonic Broadcasting System and operated by Mindanao Broadcasting Network. Its studios and transmitter are located along Ariosa St., Brgy. Balangasan, Pagadian.
