= Summit One Tower =

- Interactive map of the Summit One Tower area

General information
- Status: Completed
- Location: 530 Shaw Boulevard, Mandaluyong, Philippines
- Coordinates: 14°35′11.88″N 121°2′47.24″E
- Completed: 1998
- Owner: Facilities Incorporated

Height
- Roof: 150 m (492.13 ft)

Technical details
- Floor count: 49

Design and construction
- Architects: Andrews and Partners, Inc.
- Developer: Summit One Consortium

The Summit One Tower is an office skyscraper located in Mandaluyong, Philippines. It was originally built as a condominium project called Palladium Summit but when the concrete shell was completed, the project fell through until a local tycoon bought and converted it into an office tower. Summit One Tower was previously owned and managed by Facilities Incorporated.

It is now owned and managed by Summit One Tower Building and Allied Assets, a part of the ATN Group of Companies. The building is registered as an economic zone with the Philippine Economic Zone Authority (PEZA) and its IT locator tenants benefit from government tax incentives. Although there is no sufficient source to confirm is official height, Skyscraperpage's website has an official diagram suggesting its roof height to be around 150 meters.

It is also serves as a single-frequency network (SFN) relay transmitter of ALLTV2 Manila of the Advanced Media Broadcasting System, and the radio transmitter and studios of the FM radio station 91.5 Win Radio owned by Mabuhay Broadcasting System.

== See also ==
- List of tallest buildings in the Philippines
