= DWKY =

Radio station in Metro Manila, Philippines

Win Radio Manila (DWKY)
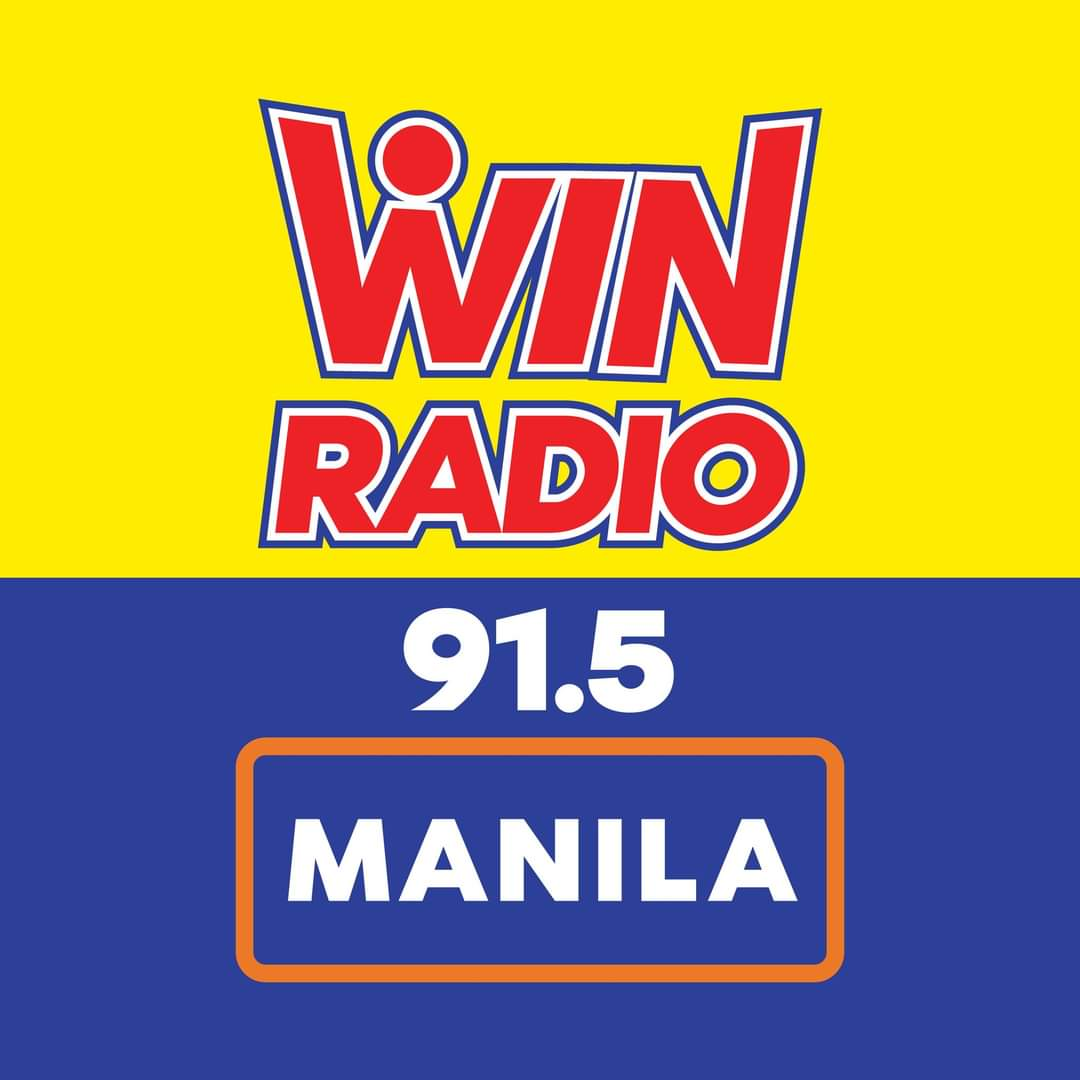
- Logo since 2023
- Mandaluyong; Philippines
- Broadcast area: Mega Manila and surrounding areas
- Frequency: 91.5 MHz
- RDS: 1. WINRADIO; 2. 91.5
- Branding: 91.5 Win Radio

Programming
- Language: Filipino
- Format: Contemporary MOR, OPM
- Network: Win Radio

Ownership
- Owner: Mabuhay Broadcasting System
- Operator: ZimZam Management

History
- First air date: 1980 (as DWMM)
- Former call signs: As Win Radio: DWNU (2010-2014)
- Former names: DWMM (1980-1985); KY 91.5 (October 1, 1985-1998); K91 (1998-2003); Energy FM (October 13, 2003-May 31, 2011); Big Radio (June 1, 2011-June 26, 2014)
- Former frequencies: As Win Radio: 107.5 MHz (2010-2014)
- Call sign meaning: Key to FM Radio (Former slogan)

Technical information
- Licensing authority: NTC
- Power: 25,000 watts
- ERP: 60,000 watts

Links
- Webcast: Listen live (via TuneIn)
- Website: http://www.winradioph.net/

DWKY (91.5 FM), broadcasting as 91.5 Win Radio, is a radio station owned by Mabuhay Broadcasting System and operated by Manuelito "Manny" Luzon's ZimZam Management, Inc. It serves as the flagship station of the Win Radio Network. The station's studio and transmitter are located at the 40th Floor, Summit One Tower, Shaw Blvd., Mandaluyong.

As of Q4 2022, 91.5 Win Radio is the 3rd most-listened to FM radio station in Metro Manila, based on a survey commissioned by Kantar Media Philippines and Kapisanan ng mga Brodkaster ng Pilipinas.

== History ==
=== 1985–1998: KY 91.5 ===
On October 1, 1985, the station began airing as KY 91.5 with the call letters DWKY, led by Al Torres (formerly from 99.5 RT, later a voiceover of GMA from 1993 to 2025). It adopted a Top 40 format, playing popular music weekdays and oldies on Sundays. Disc jockeys included Ben Tulfo and Daniel Razon.

=== 1998–2003: K91 ===
In 1998, Manny Luzon was appointed FM Operations Consultant for MBSI, leading to the rebranding of KY 91.5 to K91 FM. The station shifted its focus to novelty and contemporary pop music.

=== 2003–2011: Energy FM ===
In 2003, Ultrasonic Broadcasting System (UBS) rebranded DWKY as 91.5 Energy FM, aiming to compete with other local stations by using the tagline, “‘Wag mong sabihing radyo, sabihin mo, Energy!” The station's studios relocated to the SYSU Building in Quezon City.

From July to November 2006, The Edge Radio of United Christian Broadcasters aired on Energy FM during the 6 PM to 6 AM timeslot. Energy FM ranked second among Metro Manila stations in 2008 and, along with its provincial stations, won Best FM Station of the Year at the 18th KBP Golden Dove Awards in 2009.

After Manny Luzon's departure from UBS in 2010 to join Progressive Broadcasting Corporation, Energy FM signed off from 91.5 FM on June 1, 2011, moving to the 106.7 FM frequency a month later.

=== 2011–2014: Big Radio ===
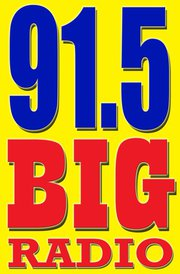
91.5 Big Radio logo (June 1, 2011-June 26, 2014)

On June 1, 2011, at 1:15 am, 91.5 Big Radio was launched under ZimZam Management, becoming a sister station to 107.5 Win Radio. Progressive Broadcasting Corporation, which acquired a minority share in MBSI, also took over management of sister station DZXQ. Bigman Marco (formerly Sgt. Mark of Energy FM) was the first to broadcast, joined by several former Energy FM jocks.

During Energy FM's transition to its new frequency, DWKY briefly used a partial stinger of the station's slogan, "'Wag mong sabihing radyo," until the full shift to 106.7 FM. For its first four months, the station operated from its former studios at the Centerpoint Building in Pasig, before relocating to the AIC Gold Tower in September.

In July 2011, a month after the rebranding, Vanguard Radio Network (VRN) filed a trademark infringement case against Manny Luzon at the Intellectual Property Office. VRN claimed Luzon used the “Big Radio” brand without permission, asserting ownership of both the “Big Radio” and “Big Sound FM” trademarks. The case was upheld in 2017, with Luzon found in violation of Section 147 of the Intellectual Property Code of the Philippines.

In late March 2012, Big Radio was ranked #3 in the FM radio ratings, based on the KBP Radio Research Council.

=== 2014–present: Win Radio ===
On June 26, 2014, 91.5 Big Radio signed off after three years on air. The following day, on June 27, 2014, it was replaced by 91.5 Win Radio, which had previously broadcast on 107.5 MHz for four years. Progressive Broadcasting Corporation's content provider Breakthrough and Milestones Productions International (affiliated with the Members Church of God International), took over 107.5 FM and launched Wish 1075 on August 10, 2014.

In 2015, Win Radio relocated to its current studios in Summit One Tower in Mandaluyong.

== Notable personalities ==
=== Former ===
- Mr. Fu

== See also ==
- Ultrasonic Broadcasting System
- 106.7 Energy FM
- Wish 1075
