= Information Broadcast Unlimited =

Philippine television and radio network

- Company type: Division
- Industry: Media company
- Founded: 2007
- Founder: Leonardo S. Gayao (20%); Michael Allan E. Sicat (20%)
- Headquarters: 2510 Raffles Building, Emerald Avenue, Ortigas Center, Pasig, Philippines
- Area served: National
- Key people: Leonardo S. Gayao
- Services: Free-to-air TV and radio broadcasting

Information Broadcast Unlimited, Inc. (IBU), is a privately owned Philippine radio and television network based in Angeles City in Pampanga. IBU also known as DZCL-TV was assigned to Ultra High Frequency (UHF) Channel 38 in Pampanga and provisional authority in other provinces in the Philippines.

The IBU corporate address is 2510 Raffles Building, Emerald Avenue, Ortigas Center, Pasig. Due to limited broadcast spectrum resources, IBU has no UHF assignment in Metro Manila. It operates 105.5 FM in Angeles City, Pampanga (but has been transferred its ownership to Reliance Broadcasting Unlimited). It has a wide coverage in Central Luzon with its signal reaching Metro Manila households.

== Congressional franchise ==
On April 28, 2009, House Bill No. 3058 was approved by the House of Representatives. It was approved by the Senate of the Philippines on third reading last May 11, 2009 for approval of the Philippine president, then Gloria Macapagal Arroyo. On July 12, 2009, it was enacted and lapsed into law as Republic Act 9652 without Arroyo's actual signature.

Republic Act 9652 grants IBU a franchise to construct, install, establish, operate and maintain for commercial purposes and in the public interest, radio and/ or television broadcasting stations in the Philippines, where frequencies and/or channels are still available for radio and/or television broadcasting, including digital radio and television system, through microwave, satellite or whatever means, including the use of any new technology that may hereafter or in the future developed in the field of radio and television broadcasting, with the corresponding technological auxiliaries and facilities, special broadcast and other program and distribution services and relay stations for 25 years.

== Private owners ==
In September 2007, six private individual investors led by businessman Leonardo S. Dayao formed Information Broadcast Unlimited, Inc. with authorized capital stock of 10 million pesos. IBU facilities are located at ComClark Annex Building, M.A. Roxas Highway cor. Ninoy Aquino Ave., Clark Freeport Zone, Pampanga, Philippines together with Angeles Cable Television Network (ACCTN) and various cable networks in Central Luzon.

== IBU Stations ==
All stations are affiliated under UNTV (Philippines) until 2025, listed as of March 2025:

=== Digital terrestrial ===
Branding	Callsign	Ch. #	Frequency	Power (kW)	Station Type	Location
UHF-40 Baguio	DZNU-DTV	40	629.143 MHz	1 kW	Relay	Baguio
UHF-36 Vigan	DWIC-DTV	36	605.143 MHz	1 kW	Relay	Vigan
UHF-39 Laoag	DWIB-DTV	39	623.143 MHz	1 kW	Relay	Laoag
UHF-51 Tuguegarao	DWIE-DTV	51	695.143 MHz	1 kW	Relay	Tuguegarao
UHF-26 Dagupan	DZPR-DTV	26	545.143 MHz	1 kW	Relay	Dagupan
UHF-34 Aparri	DZAP-DTV	34	593.143 MHz	1 kW	Relay	Aparri
UHF-51 Tuguegarao	DWIE-DTV	51	695.143 MHz	1 kW	Relay	Tuguegarao
UHF-38 Angeles	DZCL-DTV	38	617.143 MHz	1 kW	Relay	Angeles City
UHF-48 Olongapo	DWIG-DTV	48	677.143 MHz	1 kW	Relay	Olongapo
UHF-38 Lipa	DWJA-DTV	38	617.143 MHz	50 kW	Relay	Lipa City
UHF-50 Naga	DZTR-DTV	50	689.143 MHz	1 kW	Relay	Naga
UHF-43 Legazpi	DWIA-DTV	43	647.143 MHz	1 kW	Relay	Legazpi
UHF-35 Daet	DWDC-DTV	35	599.143 MHz	1 kW	Relay	Daet
UHF-42 Iloilo	DYNY-DTV	42	641.143 MHz	5 kW	Relay	Iloilo City
UHF-48 Bacolod	DYNA-DTV	48	677.143 MHz	1 kW	Relay	San Carlos (Negros)
UHF-49 Roxas	DYCZ-DTV	49	683.143 MHz	1 kW	Relay	Roxas
UHF-39 Cebu	DYNU-DTV	39	623.143 MHz	1 kW	Relay	Cebu City
UHF-50 Tagbilaran	DYID-DTV	50	689.143 MHz	1 kW	Relay	Tagbilaran
UHF-39 Tacloban	DYNV-DTV	39	623.143 MHz	1 kW	Relay	Tacloban
UHF-35 Catbalogan	DYCL-DTV	35	599.143 MHz	1 kW	Relay	Catbalogan
UHF-44 Pagadian	DXPX-DTV	44	653.143 MHz	1 kW	Relay	Pagadian
UHF-40 Zamboanga	DXNZ-TV	40	629.143 MHz	1 kW	Relay	Zamboanga City
UHF-51 Davao	DXNU-DTV	51	695.143 MHz	1 kW	Relay	Davao City
UHF-48 General Santos	DXNV-DTV	48	677.143 MHz	1 kW	Relay	General Santos
UHF-41 Cagayan de Oro	DXNY-DTV	41	635.143 MHz	5 kW	Relay	Cagayan de Oro
UHF-40 Malaybalay	DXMY-DTV	40	629.143 MHz	1 kW	Relay	Malaybalay
UHF-46 Mati / Davao	DXMT-DTV	46	665.143 MHz	1 kW	Relay	Mati
UHF-26 Bislig	DXBI-DTV	26	545.143 MHz	1 kW	Relay	Bislig
UHF-43 Surigao	DXSO-DTV	43	647.143 MHz	1 kW	Relay	Surigao City
UHF-48 Butuan	DXBX-DTV	48	677.143 MHz	1 kW	Relay	Butuan

=== Radio Stations ===
Branding	Callsign	Frequency	Power	Location
Radyo La Verdad	DZXQ	1350 kHz	50 kW	Metro Manila
