= DYWF =

Radio station in Cebu City, Philippines

FMR Cebu (DYWF)
- Cebu City; Philippines
- Broadcast area: Metro Cebu and surrounding areas
- Frequency: 93.1 MHz
- RDS: Favorite Music Radio CEBU
- Branding: 93.1 FMR

Programming
- Languages: Cebuano, Filipino
- Format: Contemporary MOR, OPM
- Network: FMR Philippines
- Affiliations: DZMM Radyo Patrol 630/DZMM TeleRadyo; ABS-CBN News (for TV Patrol newscast); PRTV Prime Media (for Arangkada Balita newscast)

Ownership
- Owner: Vimcontu Broadcasting Corporation
- Operator: Philippine Collective Media Corporation
- Sister stations: Through VIMCONTU: DYLA 909; Through PCMC: PRTV Prime Media (DYCT-DTV)

History
- First air date: May 1, 1976
- Former call signs: DYLA-FM (1976–1992)
- Former names: LA 93.1 (1976–1992); Smash FM (1992–1997, 2003-2009, 2013); Crossover (1997–2003); Club Radio (2009–2013); Brigada News FM (2013–2023)

Technical information
- Licensing authority: NTC
- Power: 10,000 watts
- ERP: 20,000 watts

Links
- Webcast: Listen Live

DYWF (93.1 FM), broadcasting as 93.1 FMR, is a radio station owned by Vimcontu Broadcasting Corporation and operated by Philippine Collective Media Corporation. The station's studio and offices are located at the 2/F JSU-PSU Mariners' Court Cebu, ALU-VIMCONTU Welfare Center, Legazpi Ext., Brgy. San Roque, Cebu City, and its transmitter is located at Brgy. Babag 1, Cebu City.

== History ==
=== 1976—1992: LA 93.1 ===
The station was inaugurated on May 1, 1976 under the call letters DYLA-FM. It was known as LA 93.1 with the slogan Your Lovely Alternative. Throughout its existence, it aired an easy listening format. It was among Cebu's early FM outlets during a period when FM radio was expanding in the Philippines to complement AM's talk and news dominance.

=== 1992—1997: First Iteration of Smash FM ===
In 1992, the station changed to its current call letters. At the same time, it rebranded as 93.1 Smash FM and adapted a Modern Rock format designed to appeal to younger audiences. Overtime, it served as a vibrant alternative in Cebu's FM landscape, which at the time featured limited rock-oriented outlets.

=== 1997—2003: Crossover ===
In September 1997, the station's operations were taken over by Mareco Broadcasting Network. It was relaunched as 93.1 Crossover and adapted a Smooth AC format, featuring a blend of smooth jazz, rhythm and blues, Latin, pop, classic soul, samba, and tropical music.

The Crossover era on this frequency endured through 2003, sustaining listener engagement among urban professionals and older demographics amid competition from pop-oriented stations, before Vimcontu terminated the lease. This shift prompted MBNI to relocate the Crossover brand to 90.7 FM, formerly occupied by another licensee, allowing DYWF to realign with its origins while the adult contemporary niche persisted elsewhere in the market.

In 2003, Crossover transferred its operations to 90.7 FM, in which Mareco acquired from Ermita.

=== 2003—2009: Second Iteration of Smash FM ===
Vimcontu Broadcasting Corporation took full control of the station. As a result, it brought back the Smash FM branding and its old format. It carried the slogan "Cebu's Rock Fortress", promoting emerging local Bisaya rock (bisrock) artists as part of its programming. Among its roster of DJs was Ramil Dizon (known on-air as DJ Ram).

=== 2009—2013: Club Radio and Third Iteration of Smash FM ===
On September 1, 2009, the station rebranded as 93.1 Club Radio and became the city's first and only FM radio station playing an all-dance format. It was known as the "hippest" and "sexiest" dance outlet, underscoring a vibrant, party-centric vibe.

By February 2013, the station's format waned amid ownership and market shifts. This prompted the management to bring back the Smash FM and adapt the mass-based format.

=== 2013—2023: Brigada News FM ===
On July 27, 2013, Brigada Mass Media Corporation, owner of Brigada Newspaper & its flagship station in General Santos, took over the station's operations and relaunched the station as 93.1 Brigada News FM under the helm of former RMN Cebu and DYKC radio announcer, station manager and Area Manager for Visayas and founder of ANAKK Inc., Raul del Prado. It was formally launched on October 1, 2013.

On December 16, 2021, Brigada News FM went off the air due to aftermath of Typhoon "Rai" (Odette) in the evening, which damaged the station's building and transmitter bought by the said typhoon. However, at the end of the year, it returned on-air just before the New Year's Day 2022.

In August 2022, the station transferred its transmitter site from Winland Tower Condominium along Juana Osmeña Ext. to Mt. Busay for better reception.

On May 15, 2023, as part of transition ahead of the expiry of Brigada's lease with Vimcontu, 90.7 FM began simulcasting this frequency during the afternoon and overnight shifts. The said frequency is among Mareco's properties leased by Brigada as part of their agreement that would take place the following month.

On June 18, 2023, upon Brigada News FM Cebu's shift of its full-time operations to 90.7 FM, this frequency continued to operate as a repeater of the latter until August 14, when it went off the air.

=== 2024—present: FM Radio ===
In January 2024, the Philippine Collective Media Corporation took over the station's operations. It had its official launch on January 13 under the FM Radio Network with a concert held at Gaisano Mall of Cebu.

On May 6, 2024, ABS-CBN's flagship newscast TV Patrol begin airing on this station, along with other selected Favorite Music Radio stations nationwide.

On June 3, 2024, after months of test broadcast, FM Radio Cebu began its own local programming.
