= DYNU-FM =

Radio station in Cebu City, Philippines

Win Radio Cebu (DYNU)
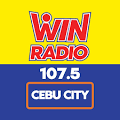
- Cebu City; Philippines
- Broadcast area: Metro Cebu and surrounding areas
- Frequency: 107.5 MHz
- RDS: BIGRadio
- Branding: 107.5 Win Radio

Programming
- Languages: Cebuano, Filipino
- Format: Contemporary MOR, OPM
- Network: Win Radio

Ownership
- Owner: Mabuhay Broadcasting System
- Operator: ZimZam Management, Inc.

History
- First air date: August 1993
- Former names: NU 107 (August 1993-February 2011)
- Call sign meaning: Pronounced as "new" (former branding)

Technical information
- Licensing authority: NTC
- Power: 10,000 watts
- ERP: 20,000 watts

Links
- Website: http://www.winradioph.net/

DYNU (107.5 FM), broadcasting as 107.5 Win Radio, is a radio station owned by Mabuhay Broadcasting System and operated by ZimZam Management, Inc. The station's studio and transmitter are located at the 4/F Ludo and Luym Bldg., Plaridel St., Cebu City.

== History ==
=== 1993–2011: NU 107 ===
The station went on the air in April 1993 as a test broadcast under the ownership of Progressive Broadcasting Corporation. In August 1993, NU 107 was launched and adopted a smooth jazz format with its first slogan Soft Wave, competing with Magic 90.7 (now Brigada News FM). At that time, their studios were located at the 14th floor of Sundowner Centerpoint Hotel in Plaridel St.

Dubbed itself as "Cebu's Rock Radio" in May 1994, NU 107 shifted to a modern rock format before it rebranded as "The Home of New Rock" two years later. By the end of 1997, the station moved its studios to the Ayala Center Cebu.

In 2002, it was downgraded into a relay station of DWNU in Manila. In 2009, it was relaunched with its local programming. In February 2011, NU 107 quietly signed off on terrestrial radio and went off the air for a week. Few months later, NU 107 Cebu began its transition into a digital-only internet station and events.

=== 2011–present: Win Radio ===
On March 4, 2011, the station returned on-air as 107.5 Win Radio under ZimZam Management. With this, it became a "more decent streaming frequency" with "responsible programming" avoiding songs with "double meaning".

In 2016, after House Bill No. 5982 was passed into law, Mabuhay Broadcasting System acquired the provincial stations of PBC.

== See also ==
- NU 107 Cebu, the radio station that existed on this frequency from 1993 to 2010 and is currently online
