= DXNY-TV =

DXNY-TV (UNTV 41 Cagayan de Oro)
- Cagayan de Oro; Philippines
- Channels: Analog: 41 (inactive)
- Branding: UNTV 41 Cagayan de Oro

Programming
- Affiliations: UNTV

Ownership
- Owner: Information Broadcast Unlimited
- Operator: Breakthrough and Milestones Productions International

History
- Founded: 1999
- Former channel numbers: Analog: 43 (UHF) (1999-2011); 41 (UHF) (2011-2024)
- Former affiliations: Progressive Broadcasting Corporation
- Call sign meaning: DXNY

Technical information
- Power: 1 kW

Links
- Website: UNTVweb.com

DXNY-TV was a television station owned by Information Broadcast Unlimited (IBU) and operated by Breakthrough and Milestones Productions International (BMPI), the network's content provider and marketing arm and Christian religious organization Members Church of God International (MCGI). The station's transmitter is located at Brgy. Cugman, Cagayan de Oro.
