= DYAC-FM =

Radio station in Cebu City, Philippines

Brigada News FM Cebu (DYAC)
- Cebu City; Philippines
- Broadcast area: Metro Cebu and surrounding areas
- Frequency: 90.7 MHz
- RDS: BRIGADA
- Branding: 90.7 Brigada News FM

Programming
- Languages: Cebuano, Filipino
- Format: Contemporary MOR, News, Talk
- Network: Brigada News FM

Ownership
- Owner: Mareco Broadcasting Network
- Operator: Brigada Mass Media Corporation

History
- First air date: 1989
- Former names: Magic 90.7 (1989–1995); DYAC (1995–1998); Energy FM (1998–2003); Crossover (2003–2020); Q Radio (2020–2023)
- Former frequencies: Brigada News FM: 93.1 MHz (2013–2023)
- Call sign meaning: Arcadio Carandang (former owner of the Molave Broadcasting Network)

Technical information
- Licensing authority: NTC
- Power: 25,000 watts (On-operational: 20,000 watts)
- ERP: 60,000 watts

Links
- Webcast: Live Stream
- Website: brigadanews.ph 90.7 Brigada News FM Cebu (Official)

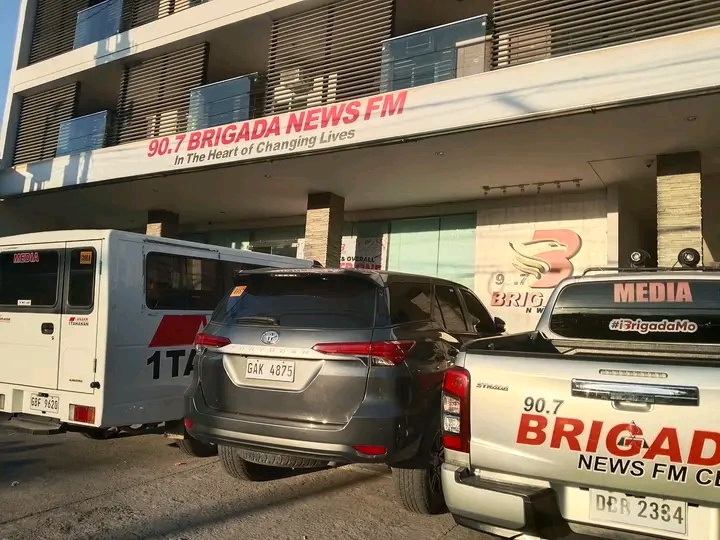
90.7 Brigada News FM Cebu studio and offices at the Uptown Residences at V. Rama Ave. cor. B. Rodriguez St.

DYAC (90.7 FM), broadcasting as 90.7 Brigada News FM, is a radio station owned by Mareco Broadcasting Network and operated by Brigada Mass Media Corporation. The station's studio and offices are located at the Uptown Residences, V. Rama Ave. cor. B. Rodriguez St., Brgy. Guadalupe, Cebu City, while its transmitter is atop Mt. Busay, Brgy. Babag 1, Cebu City (near ABS-CBN Cebu's transmitter).

Brigada News FM Cebu is currently as the dominant over-all #1 radio station in Metro Cebu, based on the Nielsen Radio Audience Measurement latest survey conducted in the Q4 2023.

== History ==
=== 1989-1995: Magic ===
The station was established in 1989 as Magic 90.7 under the ownership of Molave Broadcasting Network, a company owned by Arcadio M. Carandang. It was one of the city's first radio station to carry a smooth jazz format and was home of Light Jazz. The station was headed by radio veteran Andy Boy Suzara and personality Jennison Mendoza, along with six male disc jockeys. At that time, it was located at Doña Luisa Bldg. in Fuente Osmeña.

=== 1995-1998: DYAC ===
In 1995, the station was acquired by Ermita Electronics Corporation. It rebranded as simply DYAC with the slogan The Music Zone and carried a Top 40 format. It was led by station manager Eleanor Montilla and current Retro Cebu personality, Jake John Gesite Malagar (known on-air as Jay Fox).

=== 1998-2003: Energy FM ===
Energy FM logo from 1998 to 2003

In July 1998, Ultrasonic Broadcasting System leased the station's airtime and relaunched it as 90.7 Energy FM. Dubbed as "All hits superstation", it carried a mass-based format. In less than fifteen months, it became the overall #1 radio station in the city, based on the Radio Research Council Survey held in 1999.

In a span of two years, Energy FM held a number of promotional events with Energy @ The Movies, Bar Tour 1, Back to School (Bar Tour 2) and Bar Tour 3, where listeners who joined for a chance to win free tickets to advance screenings of hit movies and participate in their various activities to know how they can win prizes.

=== 2003-2020: Crossover ===
Crossover (2003–2020)

In October 2003, after Energy FM transferred its operations to 89.1 FM owned by Word Broadcasting Corporation, Mareco Broadcasting Network acquired the frequency from Ermita and moved Crossover's operations here. Crossover used to air on 93.1 FM owned by Vimcontu Broadcasting Corporation from its inception in September 1997 prior to its move. Among its personalities since 2014 was Eliot Verar (formerly from Z104, MOR 97.1 and NU 107).

Aside from its programming, Crossover focused on community engagement through live events and event sponsorships, like the 2006 Kalapana performance fronted by Giselle Sanchez, and the 2011 Beer and Bands on the Sand event.

=== 2020-2023: Q Radio ===
Q Radio (2020–2023)

On December 31, 2019, Horizon of the Sun Communications (producers of Chinese Filipino oriented shows Chinatown TV and Chinese News TV) took over the operations of MBNI's stations. On November 15, 2020, after almost 17 years, Crossover quietly signed off for the last time.

On November 16, 2020, the station, along with other MBNI provincial stations, was officially launched as Q Radio and switched to a CHR/Top 40 format. Aside from having its own local programming, it also simulcasted a handful of programs from its flagship station in Manila.

On December 16, 2021, Q Radio went off the air as an effect of Typhoon "Rai" (Odette) at the evening, which damaged the station's transmitter and building. A couple of weeks later, the station returned on-air after the power was restored in the area.

On May 14, 2023, at 10:00pm, Q Radio signed off for the last time, with "Wherever You Will Go" by The Calling as its swansong.

=== 2023-present: Brigada News FM ===
Earlier that month, Brigada Mass Media Corporation bought the station's airtime and relocated its studio and offices to Uptown Residences in Brgy. Guadalupe. It was later revealed on June 27, that BMMC also leased Mareco's stations in Manila, Baguio, and Davao. On May 15, as part of its transition, 90.7 FM began simulcasting 93.1 FM during automated and graveyard timeslots.

On June 18, 2023, Brigada News FM Cebu shifted its entire operations to this frequency as 90.7 Brigada News FM. The station transferred its transmitter facilities to Mt. Busay with a newly installed 20-kilowatt stereo transmitter, which in turn replace DYWF's transmitter equipment. Meanwhile, its former frequency was downgraded to a repeater of the latter until it went off the air on August 14 ahead of the expiration of Brigada's airtime lease with Vimcontu.

On June 30, 2023, at 9:31 pm, Brigada News FM aired a 2-hour special countdown program, leading up to its fully transition to this frequency the following day at midnight.

On July 1, 2023, as part of "Kalimti ang Ex, Mas Lami ang Bag-o!" transition campaign, Brigada News FM Cebu was officially launched, and the inauguration and blessing ceremony of its studio and offices in Uptown Residences in Brgy. Guadalupe, along with a motorcade at selected streets in Cebu and a free disco at the Kamagayan Food Park. Station Manager, current Area Manager for Visayas and founder of ANAKK, Inc. Raul del Prado, Brigada Group of Companies President Elmer Catulpos and other Brigada news teams and officials were present in the occasion. Former Bombo Radyo Cebu personality Atty. Juril Patiño was promoted as station manager.

In March 2024, Brigada News FM started carrying the tagline "#iBrigadaMo".

On March 31, 2025, Brigada News FM launched its new tagline "Be the Heart of the Delightful Philippines", promoting Metro Cebu as the main tourism gateway in Central Philippines as well as being the jump off to various local destinations in both the province and its neighbours.

== Controversy ==
On March 13, 2024, program hosts Dennes Regner Tabar and Atty. Juril "The Master" Broka Patiño conducted an on-air interview with a four-year old rape survivor during which the two asked the child to recount her experience. The interview sparked outcry from media organizations, child rights organizations and the Department of Social Welfare and Development for its unethicality, with journalists citing the Kapisanan ng mga Brodkaster ng Pilipinas Broadcasting Code, which stipulates the protection of child victims from enduring further persecution and trauma. The radio station's management subsequently issued a statement saying that it taken "immediate internal action to implement administrative sanctions,” adding that the hosts expressed "profound regret" and "remorse". Prior to this, the hosts said that the interview had been taken with the consent of the victim's mother. The Integrated Bar of the Philippines denounced the interview, and said that it “violated the ethical standards outlined in the Code of Professional Responsibility and Accountability (CPRA)" for lawyers, of which Patiño is one, and was "prejudicial to the child" under child-abuse laws.
