= DXNU-FM =

Radio station in Davao City, Philippines

Win Radio Davao (DXNU)
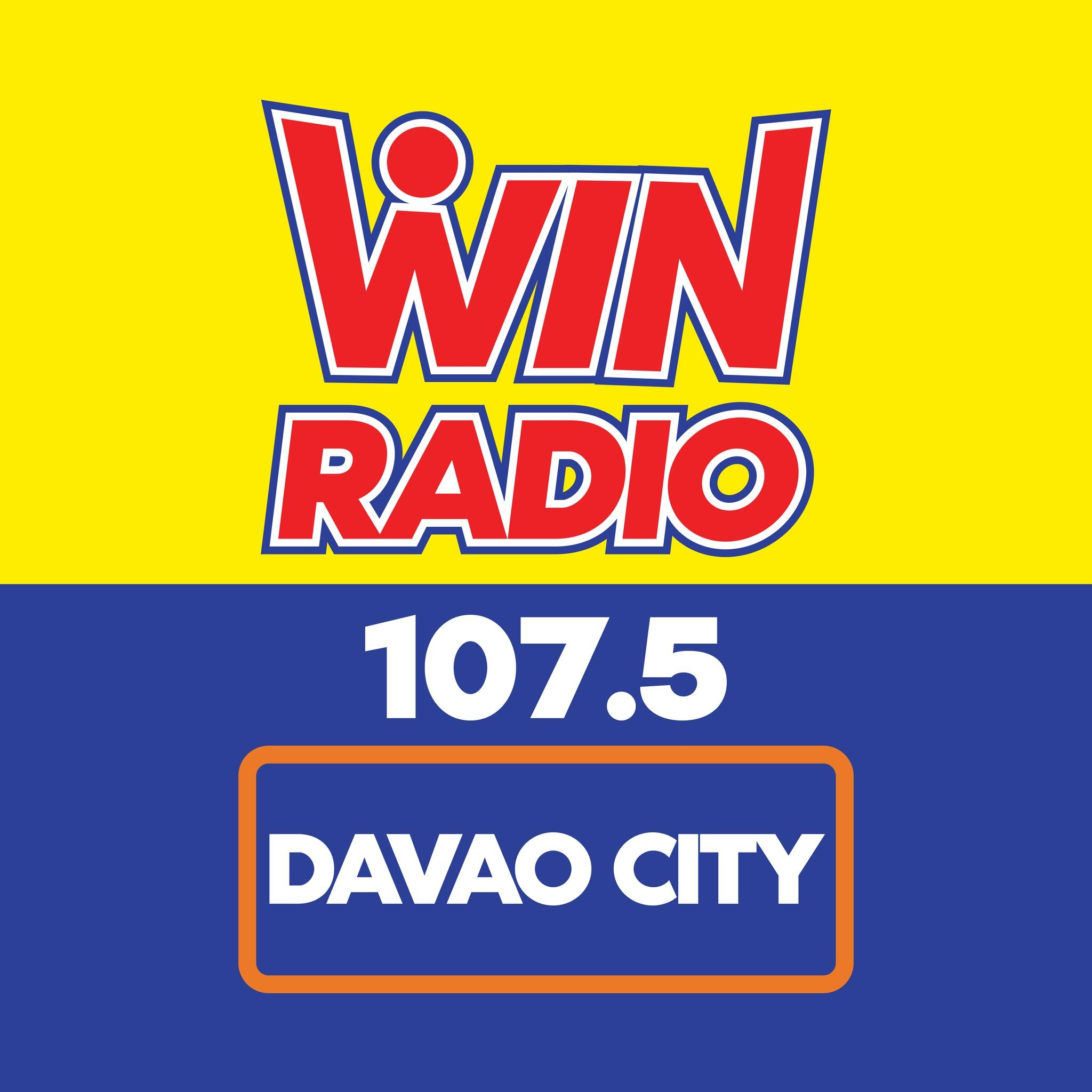
- Davao City; Philippines
- Broadcast area: Metro Davao and surrounding areas
- Frequency: 107.5 MHz
- RDS: WINRADIO
- Branding: 107.5 Win Radio

Programming
- Languages: Cebuano, Filipino
- Format: Contemporary MOR, OPM
- Network: Win Radio

Ownership
- Owner: Mabuhay Broadcasting System
- Operator: ZimZam Management, Inc.

History
- First air date: February 1, 1992
- Former names: NU 107 (February 1, 1992 – November 7, 2010)
- Call sign meaning: Pronounced as "new" (former branding)

Technical information
- Licensing authority: NTC
- Power: 10,000 watts
- ERP: 30,000 watts

Links
- Webcast: Win Radio Davao on Ustream
- Website: http://www.winradioph.net/

DXNU (107.5 FM), broadcasting as 107.5 Win Radio, is a radio station owned by Mabuhay Broadcasting System and operated by ZimZam Management, Inc. The station's studio and transmitter are located along Broadcast Ave., Shrine Hills, Brgy. Matina Crossing, Davao City.

== History ==
The station began operations on February 1, 1992, as NU 107 with a modern rock format. It was formerly under the ownership of Progressive Broadcasting Corporation. In 2010, it became a relay station of DWNU in Manila. On September 1, 2012, it began airing its own local programming under the Win Radio network.

In 2016, after House Bill No. 5982 was passed into law, Mabuhay Broadcasting System acquired the provincial stations of PBC.
