= Interactive Broadcast Media =

Philippine radio network

Interactive Broadcast Media, Inc.
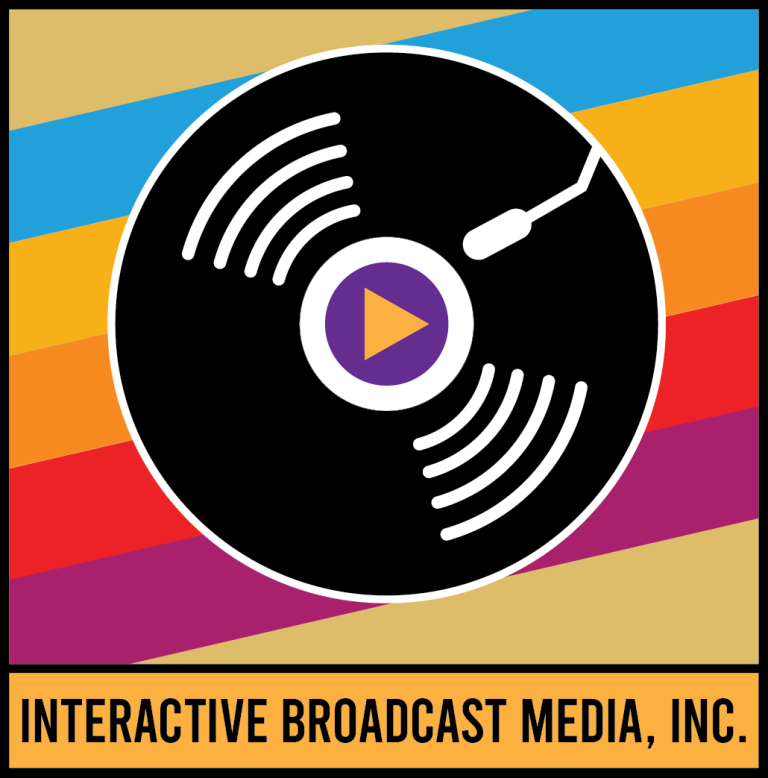
- Type: Private
- Industry: Broadcast
- Founded: October 31, 1996
- Founder: Roberto Bacsal; Rene Palma
- Headquarters: San Juan, Metro Manila, Philippines
- Key people: Eric S. Canoy Chairman and President, IBMI, RMN and RMN-MMV; Enrico Guido Canoy General Manager, IBMI EVP and COO, RMN
- Owner: EDCanoy Prime Holdings, Inc. (49%)
- Website: https://ibmi.ph/wp/

Interactive Broadcast Media, Inc. (IBMI) is a Philippine radio network based in San Juan, Metro Manila, Philippines.

== History ==
IBMI was established on October 31, 1996 by broadcast veteran Roberto Bacsal and businessman Rene Palma as a media outlet for the then-newly acquired DWWW. Back then, its offices were located at #23 E. Rodriguez Sr. Ave. in Quezon City.

In 2010, Antonio "Tonyboy" Cojuangco Jr. acquired a non-controlling share of IBMI and transferred ownership of radio stations that spun-off from Associated Broadcasting Company (collectively known as Dream FM Network) and its idle TV stations into the former.

In November 2011, IBMI moved to its new home in Atlanta Center in San Juan, Metro Manila after Radio Mindanao Network took over DWWW's operations. In 2012, RMN's parent company, EDCanoy Prime Holdings, acquired 49% of IBMI.

On March 7, 2016, Philippine President Benigno S. Aquino III signed Republic Act No. 10753 which renewed IBMI's legislative franchise for another 25 years. The law granted IBMI a franchise to construct, install, operate, and maintain, for commercial purposes, radio broadcasting stations and television stations, including digital television system, with the corresponding facilities such as relay stations, throughout the Philippines. The law took effect on September 5, 2021.

== Stations ==
=== Radio stations ===
==== AM ====
Callsign	Frequency	Location	Notes
DWWW	774 kHz	Metro Manila	Affiliated with Radio Mindanao Network.

==== FM ====
Branding	Callsign	Frequency	Location	Notes
Energy FM Manila	DWET	106.7 MHz	Metro Manila	Operated by Ultrasonic Broadcasting System.
DWWW	DWHT	107.9 MHz	Dagupan	Frequency owned by Broadcast Enterprises and Affiliated Media.
Boracay Beach Radio	DYKP	97.3 MHz	Boracay	Under Dream FM Network.
True FM Davao	DXET	106.7 MHz	Davao	Operated by TV5 Network Inc.
Parekoy Radio	DXER	93.5 MHz	Polomolok	Operated by Gev Advertisement Marketing.

==== Former radio stations ====
Callsign	Frequency	Location	Notes
DWTE-FM	106.7 MHz	Laoag	Off the air since July 2011.
DXXR-FM	95.9 MHz	Polomolok	Frequency owned by Rizal Memorial Colleges Broadcasting Corporation. Currently broadcasting as XFM.

=== TV 5 ===
==== Analog ====
Callsign	Channel (UHF)	Type	Location	Programming
PA	39	Affiliate	Tuguegarao	TV5
PA	28	Affiliate	Olongapo	TV5
PA	30	Affiliate	Batangas	TV5
PA	41	Affiliate	Kalibo	TV5

==== Former stations ====
Callsign	Channel (UHF)	Type	Location	Notes
DWTE	47	Originating	Quezon City	Off the air since January 16, 2003.
