= Mabuhay Broadcasting System =

Philippine radio network

- Type: Private
- Industry: Radio network
- Founded: December 13, 1973
- Founder: Quirino de Guzman Sr. Arcardio Carandang
- Headquarters: Pasig, Metro Manila, Philippines
- Key people: Cynthia G. Ragasa (Chairman); Manuelito F. Luzon (President)
- Owner: Ragasa Family (64%); Henares Family (25%); Others (11%)

Mabuhay Broadcasting System, Inc. (MBSI) is a Philippine radio network majority owned by the Ragasa family, heirs of founder Quirino De Guzman. Its corporate office is located at the 17th Floor, The Centerpoint, Julia Vargas Ave., Ortigas Center, Pasig, and its main studio is located at the 40th Floor Summit One Tower, Shaw Boulevard, Mandaluyong, Metro Manila. MBSI derives most of its income by selling airtime to blocktimers. MBSI's stations nationwide are operated by ZimZam Management of Manuelito "Manny" F. Luzon under the Win Radio brand.

== Background ==
In November 1973, during the martial law in the Philippines, Quirino De Guzman Sr. and Arcadio M. Carandang decided form a joint venture and organize a corporation known as Mabuhay Broadcasting Systems, Inc. (MBSI). Carandang contributed his technical expertise and new equipment while De Guzman pooled financial resources and needed franchise to the company. It was registered with the Securities and Exchange Commission (SEC) on December 13, 1973.

MBSI was granted a 25-year legislative franchise on April 13, 1992, under Republic Act (R.A.) 7395 to construct, install, operate and maintain commercial radio broadcasting stations in the island of Luzon. Based on recent SEC filing, MBSI is majority owned by the Ragasa Family, heirs of Quirino de Guzman Sr. with 64% share.

In 2011, DZXQ was acquired by a new set of investors, which was later related to Information Broadcast Unlimited. Not long after, the Henares family acquired a minority stake in MBSI, making it an affiliate company of Progressive Broadcasting Corporation, a nationwide radio and television network headed by Alfredo "Atom" L. Henares.

On February 1, 2015, House Bill No. 5982 was approved by the House of Representatives and Senate of the Philippines renewing MBSI's franchise for another 25 years and expanding its coverage to include both radio and television broadcasting throughout the Philippines. It was approved by President Benigno Aquino III on May 10, 2016. Not long after, MBSI acquired the provincial stations owned by PBC.

== MBSI stations ==
=== Current ===
Branding	Callsign	Frequency	Location
Win Radio Manila	DWKY	91.5 MHz	Metro Manila
Win Radio Naga	DWMW	107.9 MHz	Naga
Win Radio Iloilo	DYNY	107.9 MHz	Iloilo City
Win Radio Cebu	DYNU	107.5 MHz	Cebu City
Win Radio Cagayan de Oro	DXNY	107.9 MHz	Cagayan de Oro
Win Radio Davao	DXNU	107.5 MHz	Davao City

=== Former ===
Callsign	Frequency	Location	Current Owner
DZXQ	1350 kHz	Metro Manila	Information Broadcast Unlimited
