= Progressive Broadcasting Corporation =

Philippine radio and television network

- Type: Private
- Industry: Mass media
- Founded: August 31, 1987 (radio broadcasting); July 16, 2001 (television broadcasting)
- Headquarters: Unit 4002 Summit One Tower, Shaw Boulevard, Mandaluyong
- Area served: Worldwide
- Key people: Alfredo Henares (Chairman/President); Hilarion Henares† (Former Chairman Emeritus); Joselito Pedero (Vice Chairman); Manuelito Luzon (EVP)
- Products: Wish 1075; UNTV; Truth Channel
- Parent: Alfredo "Atom" L. Henares (70% as of 2015)
- Divisions: untvweb.com
- Subsidiaries: Breakthrough and Milestones Productions International (content provider for FM radio and television)

UNTV Network, Inc.
- Type: Parent
- Industry: Media company
- Founded: July 16, 2001
- Headquarters: 351 EDSA, Bagong Barrio, Caloocan City, Philippines
- Area served: Worldwide
- Key people: Daniel Razon (Chairman and CEO)
- Products: UNTV; Radio La Verdad 1350; Wish FM 107.5
- Services: Radio and Television Production, publishing, news, websites, movie production, talent management and development
- Parent: Progressive Broadcasting Corporation
- Website: www.untvweb.com

Progressive Broadcasting Corporation (PBC) is a Philippine radio and television network owned by businessman Alfredo L. Henares with 70% equity share together with Joselito N. Pedero (15.3%) and Dennis T. Villareal (14.5%). The company was registered in the Philippine Securities and Exchange Commission (SEC) on October 6, 1986. Its studios are located at Unit 4002 Summit One Tower, Shaw Boulevard, Mandaluyong. PBC derives most of its income by selling airtime to blocktimers.

PBC's flagship UHF TV station in Mega Manila, UNTV Channel 37 (now UNTV News and Rescue) is operated and maintained by its content provider Breakthrough and Milestones Productions International, Inc. (BMPI), led by veteran broadcaster and TV host "Kuya" Daniel Razon. PBC is also known for its FM station Wish 107.5 in Mega Manila, which was formerly known as NU 107 from its inception in 1987 to 2010 and Win Radio from 2010 to 2014.

== History ==
=== Legislative Franchise ===
It was granted a 25-year legislative franchise on November 19, 1991, under Republic Act (R.A.) 7163 to construct, install, operate and maintain commercial radio and TV broadcasting stations in Metro Manila, Region I, Region VI and Region VII signed by Philippine President Corazon C. Aquino. On September 23, 1995, R.A. 8162 was approved to amend its franchise extending its operations throughout the Philippines. On August 24, 2015, House Bill No. 5940 was approved by the House of Representatives and by the Senate of the Philippines on January 18, 2016, to extend PBC's franchise. On May 18, 2016, President Benigno S. Aquino III signed Republic Act No. 10820 which renewed PBC's license for another 25 years. The law grants PBC a franchise to construct, install, operate, and maintain, for commercial purposes, radio broadcasting stations and television stations, including digital television system, with the corresponding facilities such as relay stations, throughout the Philippines.

=== Radio ===
Wish FM
- Type: Broadcast FM radio network (Contemporary MOR, Music)
- Country: Philippines
- Availability: Mega Manila
- Founded: August 10, 2014
- Owner: Progressive Broadcasting Corporation
- Official website: www.wish1075.com

On August 31, 1987, an unknown radio station started broadcasting at the frequency of 107.5 on the FM band. Playing what was then known as new wave, the station aired for a month, no call letters, no jocks. When they finally announced "This is dwNU, if you're listening, please call..." After mentioning the phone number on air, the phone rang constantly for three hours.

On November 7, 2010, NU 107 made its final broadcast. On November 9, 2010, DWNU was rebranded as 107.5 Win Radio with a mass-based format. On June 26, 2014, Win Radio aired its last broadcast on 107.5 FM. Two days later, Win Radio transferred its broadcast to 91.5 FM, the frequency formerly branded as 91.5 Big Radio.

In 2014, UNTV-BMPI became the content provider for 107.5 FM. The newest station held a soft launch during UNTV's 10th anniversary concert held at the World Trade Center, Pasay City on June 26, 2014. The station was subsequently rebranded as 107.5 Wish FM, and formally launched on August 10, 2014 at the World Trade Center. Meanwhile, PBC's Cebu, Cagayan de Oro, Davao and Iloilo FM stations retained the Win Radio brand. However, in 2016, after House Bill No. 5982 was passed into law, Mabuhay Broadcasting System acquired the provincial stations of PBC.

=== Television ===
UNTV
- Type: Broadcast UHF cable satellite Internet television network
- Country: Philippines
- Availability: National/ International
- Founded: July 16, 2001 by Alfredo L. Henares
- TV stations: List of TV stations
- Headquarters: La Verdad Christian College (LVCC) Building, Bagong Barrio, EDSA Caloocan
- Owner: Progressive Broadcasting Corporation (PBC)
- Key people: Alfredo "Atom" L. Henares (Chairman, President of PBC); Daniel Razon (Chairman, CEO of BMPI)
- Launch date: 1999 as NUTV; 2001 as UNTV
- Former names: UNTV (2004–2015); UNTV Life (2015–2016)
- Picture format: NTSC 480i (4:3 SDTV); 16:9 1080p (HDTV) (downscaled to 720p locally in some markets)
- Official website: untvweb.com
- Language: English; Filipino

In July 2001, PBC ventured to UHF television through UNTV 37. UNTV started in May 2002 as a television counterpart to NU 107, airing rock-related music videos. In its early years, UNTV gained viewers' attention through the program Strangebrew, a.k.a. Ang show na may tama. Starting in 2003, the station started airing religious content from Ang Dating Daan, a former blocktimer in SBN 21. In 2004, UNTV began airing contents from Tapatan, Inc. led by veteran broadcaster Jay Sonza. UNTV gradually reduced and eventually stopped airing rock music videos. Since then, it became a 24/7 television station, airing not only religious programs, but also news and information content. In 2007, Breakthrough and Milestones Productions International, Inc. or BMPI led by veteran broadcaster Daniel Razon, took over the operations of the network, and repositioned itself as public service channel.

The transformation from its original incarnation became more distinct after a change in the pronunciation of the station's name to you-en-tee-vee or "you-en" television, rather than un-tee-vee.

== Stations ==
=== UNTV ===
==== Digital ====
Branding	Callsign	Channel	Frequency	Power	Location
UNTV Manila	DWAO	38	617.143 MHz	2.5 kW	Metro Manila

==== Analog (Inactive/Defunct) ====
Branding	Callsign	Channel	Power	Type	Location
UNTV Manila	DWAO	37	25 kW	Originating	Metro Manila
UNTV Tarlac	DZXT	28	1 kW	Relay	Tarlac City
UNTV Naga	DZTR	50	5 kW	Relay	Naga
UNTV Iloilo	DYNY	42	5 kW	Relay	Iloilo City
UNTV Bacolod	DYNA	28	10 kW	Relay	San Carlos
UNTV Cebu	DYNU	39	5 kW	Relay	Cebu City
UNTV Tacloban	DYNV	39	5 kW	Relay	Tacloban
UNTV Cagayan de Oro	DXNY	41	10 kW	Relay	Cagayan de Oro
UNTV Davao	DXNU	51	10 kW	Relay	Davao City
UNTV General Santos	DXNV	48	5 kW	Relay	General Santos

=== FM Stations ===
==== Current ====
Branding	Callsign	Frequency	Power	Coverage
Wish 107.5	DWNU	107.5 MHz	25 kW	Metro Manila

==== Former stations ====
Callsign	Frequency	Coverage	Status
DYNY	107.9 MHz	Iloilo City	Licenses transferred to Mabuhay Broadcasting System.
DYNU	107.5 MHz	Cebu City	Licenses transferred to Mabuhay Broadcasting System.
DXNY	107.9 MHz	Cagayan de Oro	Licenses transferred to Mabuhay Broadcasting System.
DXNU	107.5 MHz	Davao City	Licenses transferred to Mabuhay Broadcasting System.
DXNV	107.9 MHz	General Santos	Off the air. Currently licensed under Mabuhay Broadcasting System.

== Television ==
=== UNTV ===
PBC's flagship television network is UNTV, also known as UNTV News and Rescue). It was launched in July 2001 with various rebranding since then. UNTV is referred to as the “Kasangbahay Network” in reference to a Biblical passage about God's household. Its studios are located at the La Verdad Christian College Building, Bagong Barrio, EDSA Caloocan. Its future headquarters in Quezon City, the UNTV Broadcast Center, is currently under construction. In 2015, UNTV started testing ISDB-T, the approved digital terrestrial television (DTT) standard in the Philippines and is only available in Mega Manila.

=== UNTV Subchannels ===
UNTV's Social TV (STV) is a digital television subchannel with contents coming from social media creators and contributors. In 2020, it was replaced and reverted to the same video feed from UNTV News and Rescue, this time at the 1080p quality. Another UNTV digital television subchannel is Ang Dating Daan Television (ADDTV) which airs religious programs by Members Church of God International. It was later on rebranded as Truth Channel.

== Radio ==
DWNU-FM, also known as Wish 107.5, is the flagship FM radio station of PBC. It airs music and features programs provided by Breakthrough and Milestones Production International, Inc. as its content provider.

== See also ==
- Philippine television networks
- List of Philippine media companies
