= Win Radio =

Broadcast radio network in the Philippines

ZimZam Management, Inc.
- Formerly: One Radio Management
- Type: Private
- Industry: Broadcasting, Advertising
- Founded: 2010
- Headquarters: Philippines
- Area served: Nationwide
- Key people: Manuelito "Manny" Luzon (President)

Win Radio
- Type: Broadcast FM radio network, Contemporary MOR, OPM)
- Country: Philippines
- Availability: Nationwide
- Founded: November 8, 2010
- Motto: Pinag-iisipan Pa Ba Yan! In-inini!
- Owner: ZimZam Management, Inc.
- Former names: NU 107 (as terrestrial radio, 1987-2010)

Win Radio is a commercial radio brand owned by ZimZam Management, Inc., led by veteran radio executive Manuelito “Manny” Luzon. Unlike major rivals directly operated by their parent companies, ZimZam leases airtime from third-party networks due to the lack of a legal broadcast franchise.

Win Radio currently airs on stations owned by Mabuhay Broadcasting System.

== History ==
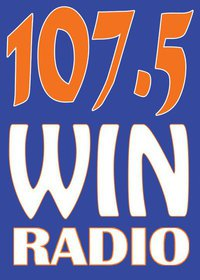
107.5 Win Radio logo (November 8, 2010-June 26, 2014)

Win Radio emerged after PBC's NU 107, a modern rock station, faced financial struggles and declining ratings. To revive the brand, PBC appointed veteran Manny Luzon as EVP and COO on October 10, 2010. On November 10, 2010, two days after NU 107 ceased operations, the frequency was relaunched as 107.5 Win Radio. Reformatted as a “more decent mainstream frequency,” Win Radio sets itself apart with "responsible programming," avoiding songs with double meanings typical of the masa market. Provincial stations followed suit between January and March 2011. Just four months after launching, Win Radio Manila ranked #7 in the March 2011 KBP Radio Research Council survey.

To expand coverage, the Henares family acquired a 25% stake in Mabuhay Broadcasting System. On June 1, 2011, 91.5 FM, not long after Energy FM went off the air on that frequency, was relaunched as 91.5 Big Radio. Big Radio peaked at #3 in March 2012 KBP ratings. Both stations shared former NU 107 facilities in Ortigas Center and collaborated on promotions like “The Win-Big Singing Talent Search,” creating a Luzon-led duopoly in Metro Manila. ZimZam Management began modernizing by leasing broadcast space at Summit One Tower in Mandaluyong for their studios.

However, on June 28, 2014, plans changed when Breakthrough and Milestones Productions International, operator of PBC-owned UNTV, took over the operations of 107.5 FM and launched Wish 107.5. In response, Luzon cut ties with PBC, shut down Big Radio, and moved Win Radio's operations to 91.5 FM.

== Stations ==
=== Current ===
Branding	Callsign	Frequency	Location
Win Radio Manila	DWKY	91.5 MHz	Metro Manila
Win Radio Naga	DWMW	107.9 MHz	Naga
Win Radio Iloilo	DYNY	107.9 MHz	Iloilo
Win Radio Cebu	DYNU	107.5 MHz	Cebu
Win Radio Cagayan de Oro	DXNY	107.9 MHz	Cagayan de Oro
Win Radio Davao	DXNU	107.5 MHz	Davao

=== Former ===
Callsign	Frequency	Location	Status
DWNU	107.5 MHz	Metro Manila	Currently broadcasting as Wish 107.5.
DXNV	107.9 MHz	General Santos	Off the air.
DXSR	97.7 MHz	Valencia	Currently broadcasting as Radyo Sincero.
