= TP =

TP, Tp, tP, tp, or T&P may refer to:

== Arts, entertainment and media ==
=== Fictional characters ===
- T. P. Balagopalan, of T. P. Balagopalan M. A., a 1986 Indian Malayalam-language comedy drama film
- Time Pilfer Lady, or Hitomi Aino, in Japanese anime series Flint the Time Detective
- Talita Aleni née Palele, a Shortland Street character introduced in 1993
- Te Aroha Pene, in New Zealand TV show The Killian Curse
- Tommy Pickles, in animated children's TV series Rugrats and All Grown Up!

=== Music ===
- Tonic parallel (Tp and tP), a kind of chord in music theory
- TP (Teddy Pendergrass album), 1980
- TP, or Tony Parker, a 2007 album by Tony Parker
- A series of R&B studio albums by R. Kelly: 12 Play (1993), TP-2.com (2000), TP.3 Reloaded (2005)

=== Television ===
- TPs, characters in The Tomorrow People, a British science fiction TV series
- TP de Oro (initially Los mejores de TP; 1972–2011), a Spanish annual awards series
- Talking Pictures TV (TPTV), a British TV channel
- Telewizja Polska (known as TP 1976–1992), a public service broadcaster in Poland

=== Other uses in arts, entertainment and media ===
- Time Patrol Bon (T・Pぼん), a Japanese manga series by Fujiko F. Fujio
- Theater paddle, or stage pin connector, a standard cable type for theatrical lighting
- Tension points, a character state property in Deltarune and Xenoblade Chronicles X
- Tractatus Politicus, a writing by Baruch Spinoza in 1675–77

== Business and organisations ==
=== Businesses ===
- TP ICAP, British financial services firm
- TP-Link, Chinese technology company
- TP Tea, a bubble tea shop chain in Taiwan
- TP Vision, Dutch consumer electronics manufacturer
- TP (Telekomunikacja Polska), now Orange Polska, Polish telecommunications provider
- PT Portugal, now Altice Portugal, telecommunications service provider in Portugal
- Tata Power, Indian electric utility and electricity generation company
- Teleperformance, French business process outsourcer

=== Organisations ===
- People's Party (Latvia) (Tautas partija), a political party
- Tendencia proletaria ('proletarian tendency'), a faction of the Sandinista National Liberation Front, a Nicaraguan political party
- Terre et Peuple, a cultural association in France
- Temasek Polytechnic, education institution in Singapore

== Language and linguistics ==
- tp (digraph), pronounced in Yélî Dnye as /t̪͡p/
- Tibetan pinyin (Chinese: 藏文拼音, romanized: Zàngwén Pīnyīn, ZWPY), the official transcription system for the Tibetan language in China
- Tense phrase, in X-bar theory

== People ==
- Thomas Bennett (architect) (1887–1980), English architect with practice TP Bennett
- T. P. Chandrasekharan (1960–2012), Indian politician
- TP Fielden, pen-name of writer Christopher Wilson (born 1947)
- T. P. Figgis (1858–1948), British architect
- T. P. Gill (1858–1931), Irish journalist and politician
- T. P. Kailasam (1884–1946), Indian playwright and writer
- T. P. Madhavan (1935–2024), Indian actor
- T. P. McKenna (1929–2011), Irish actor
- T. P. O'Connor (1848–1929), Irish politician and journalist
- T. P. Rajeevan (1959–2022), Indian novelist
- Rehenesh T. P. (born 1993), Indian footballer
- TP Sudhindra (born 1984), Indian cricketer
- T. P. Cameron Wilson (1888–1918), English poet and novelist
- T. P. Wiseman (born 1940), English scholar
- Heitor Pereira (born 1960), or Hector TP, Brazilian composer

== Places ==
- Tanjong Pagar, a sub-town in Singapore
- Tai Po, an area in Hong Kong
- Toa Payoh, a planning area and residential town in Singapore
- Tunjungan Plaza, a shopping center in Indonesia
- Portuguese Timor (1702–1975), ISO 3166 code TP
- TP, for thành phố, 'city' in Vietnamese
- Tigné Point, Sliema, Malta (postal code: TP)
- Province of Trapani, Sicily, Italy (ISO 3166 code: IT-TP; vehicle registration code: TP)

== Science and technology ==
=== Astronomy and cosmology ===
- Time of perihelion passage (tp), an orbital element (parameter)
- Thermally pulsing asymptotic giant branch (TP-AGB), a phase of some stars' lifecycle
- a provisional designation in astronomy for the 15th (or with a suffix, 40th, 65th, etc.) minor planet discovered in the first half of October of each year
- Planck time (t_{P}), a Planck unit in cosmology

=== Chemistry ===
- Tp ligands, a class of scorpionate ligands
- Trispyrazolylborate (Tp^{−}), a chemical ligand
- Total phosphorus, a measure of the amount of element 15 present
- Thermoplastic polyester, a kind of polymer

=== Electronics and computing ===
- .tp, the 1997–2015 Internet domain of Timor-Leste (Timor Português)
- Teleprocessing monitor, or TP Monitor, control program that monitors data transfers between terminals
- Test point, in electronics
- Tidal power, technology to extract energy from tides
- t_{p}, system pulse duration, in glossary of power electronics
- Technical preview or technology preview, the beta stage of the software release life cycle
- Turbo Pascal, a software development system for programming language Pascal
- Twisted pair cabling, in telecommunications
- Transparency Platform, of European Network of Transmission System Operators for Electricity
- Sony Vaio TP series (2007–2008), living room PCs

=== Medicine and biochemistry ===
- Temporal pole, a part of the human brain
- Toulouse-Piéron Cancellation Test, developed by Louis Charles Henri Piéron and Édouard Toulouse
- Serum total protein, a clinical chemistry parameter
- Testosterone propionate, an androgen and anabolic steroid medication
- Thromboxane prostanoid receptor, a protein found in humans and other mammals
- Thymidine phosphorylase, an enzyme and catalyst
- Glyceraldehyde 3-phosphate, or triose phosphate (TP), a metabolite

== Sports ==
- Triple play, denoted as TP in baseball statistics
- Tighthead prop, a position in rugby union
- Triple Peel, a croquet manoeuvre
- TP Formula, a motor racing team based in Italy

== Transportation ==
=== Rail ===
- Texas and Pacific Railway, T&P, United States railroad company
- KAI Commuter Tanjung Priok Line, a commuter rail line in Jakarta, Indonesia
- SJ Tp, a Swedish diesel-hydraulic locomotive
- TransPennine Express, British train operating company, reporting mark TP
- Tiruchirappalli Fort Railway Station, Tamil Nadu, India, station code TP

=== Other uses in transportation ===
- TP, an electric vehicle by Thunder Power
- Transport Pool Inc., original name (1968) of TIP Group, Dutch logistics equipment company
- Taunsa–Panjnad Link Canal, in Punjab, Pakistan
- TAP Air Portugal, IATA airline code TP
- Swallow TP, a 1928 trainer aircraft
- TP, designation of Harbor Tug, an American Type V ship

== Other uses ==
- Tagapangasiwang Pampook, now known as Area Servants (Tagalog: Lingkod Pampook), in the Philippine Members Church of God International
- Toilet paper, a tissue paper product
- Tight passive, in poker

== See also ==
- Tipping point (disambiguation)
- Turning Point (disambiguation)
- Tribal police (disambiguation)
- 3P (disambiguation)
- Tipi (disambiguation)
