= Conflicts between Iglesia ni Cristo and Members Church of God International =

Since 1980, there have been conflicts between Philippine-based Christian religious organizations Iglesia ni Cristo ("Church of Christ", INC) and the Members Church of God International (MCGI), when MCGI Overall Servant Eliseo Soriano started his radio program Ang Dating Daan (ADD). Through his program, he discussed biblical issues and "exposed" what he believes to be wrong doctrines of other religious groups, including those of INC. In 2001, after 20 years of reticence, the INC launched its own program, Ang Tamang Daan, as a direct response for the first time to Ang Dating Daan, featuring video footages and recordings of ADD hosts as issues were tackled. Over time, the animosity between the two groups has intensified and the relationship has been severely strained.

== Background ==
Beginning with the broadcast of Ang Tamang Daan on June 11, 2001, INC (through SBN 21, and later Net 25, INC TV, and INC Cable TV) and MCGI (through SBN 21 and later UNTV Channel 37) aired their accusations and responses to each other's statements. Their television programs contributed largely to the aggravation of their relations.

On August 16, 2004, the Movie and Television Review and Classification Board (MTRCB) preventively suspended the showing of the Ang Dating Daan program for 20 days due to slander and use of offensive and obscene language by its televangelist-host Eliseo Soriano, as a means of disciplinary action.

On September 27, 2004, the MTRCB extended the suspension to three months. Soriano challenged the action in court, arguing that the suspension imposed by the MTRCB constituted prior restraint on the media and that his language during the show's August 10, 2004, broadcast was not obscene and offensive. The court dismissed his case in favor of MTRCB.

In June 2005, Soriano filed a motion by recommendation of the Commission on Human Rights (CHR), saying the MTRCB violated the "right to information, communication and religion" of every Filipino. On April 29, 2009, The Supreme Court upheld the suspension imposed by the MTRCB, ruling that Soriano’s statements can be treated as obscene and cannot be considered as protected speech.

Soriano filed a motion seeking the reversal of its April 2009 decision. The Supreme Court denied Soriano's motion and affirmed the decision with finality in 2010 by an 11-4 vote, noting that “it is a sanction that the MTRCB may validly impose under its charter without running afoul of the free speech clause." The high court reminded Soriano that his program, being aired on television, is accessible to children of all ages and therefore not appropriate for a program with a “G” or for general audience rating due to his use of vulgar language and invectives. However, the Commission on Human Rights continued its administrative case against the Ombudsman, stating that the MTRCB had illegally extended the suspension and thus, created a "double suspension" effect.

The case stemmed from a complaint filed by members of the Iglesia ni Cristo, including its minister Michael Sandoval, due to statements of Soriano aired on August 10 referring to the minister:

Lehitimong anak ng demonyo! Sinungaling! [Legitimate son of demon! Liar!]

Gago ka talaga, Michael! Masahol ka pa sa putang babae, o di ba? Yung putang babae, ang gumagana lang doon yung ibaba. Dito kay Michael, ang gumagana ang itaas, o di ba? O, masahol pa sa putang babae ‘yan. Sobra ang kasinungalingan ng mga demonyong ito. [You’re really stupid, Michael! You’re worse than a whore! ... These demons are lying too much.]

== Debates ==
In attempts to end the conflict between the two groups, a number of debate arrangements had been in talks on different occasions. But while there were previous agreements made, no proper debate had actually materialized between the groups due to varying reasons.

In 2003, Soriano's worker and student King Cortez faced two ministers of the Iglesia ni Cristo in Eastern Samar in a debate about the nature of Christ, focusing on the INC teaching “Si Cristo ay Hindi Dios” (Christ is not God). Cortez defended Soriano’s group’s position on Christ’s divinity. The recorded debate was later viewed by Soriano and his ministers, who reportedly reacted positively and expressed confidence in Cortez’s performance.

In 2004, Manny Antonio, a worker (presbyter) of MCGI, and Abraham Cruz, an INC minister, had a signed agreement to meet for a debate conference on April 26 in the city hall of Capas, Tarlac. Present on the agreed setting was the mayor of Capas, Rey Catacutan, the representing ministers of INC, Abraham Cruz, Jose Ventilacion, Ramil Parba, Michael Sandoval, and the barangay captain of Pao, San Jose, Tarlac, who stood as the witness of the agreement signing. However, no representative from MCGI, including Antonio, turned up on the event and instead communicated through a phone call. The debate did not push through.

On March 27, 2005, Soriano challenged Eraño G. Manalo, the Executive Minister of Iglesia ni Cristo, to a one-on-one debate on TV and internet. The Ang Tamang Daan hosts responded that Soriano should have a debate first with the "Pope in Rome using Latin," owing to a previous claim by Soriano that he would debate with the Pope, even in Latin. Soriano views this response as an excuse, while Jose Ventilacion of the Iglesia ni Cristo reportedly responded by formally calling for a debate, saying he had long accepted Soriano’s challenge. After Soriano declared, “Patutunayan ko sa inyo totoo ang salita ng Dios; ’yung pinakamataas ang pinag-aralan sa theology ang iharap ninyo sa akin", Ventilacion did not respond further or publicly pursue the debate afterward.

One of the hosts of Ang Tamang Daan, Ramil Parba, challenged Willy Santiago and Josel Mallari, both hosts of Ang Dating Daan, to a debate, in response to a challenge allegedly made by Santiago.

== Lawsuits ==
In August 2003, the Iglesia ni Cristo sued Soriano for libel after Soriano accused them of publishing explicit comic books depicting Soriano having homosexual sex. In 2007, Soriano filed multiple petitions to stop the lawsuit to no avail.

Soriano had since been indicted on rape charges at the regional trial court of Macabebe, Pampanga, following a complaint filed by former MCGI productions (ADDCIT) staff Daniel Veridiano that he was sexually assaulted in Apalit, Pampanga on two occasions, along with other members of MCGI. The initial provincial prosecutor of Pampanga dismissed the case due to lack of evidence, but Raul M. Gonzalez who was then the secretary of the Philippines' Department of Justice, had the prosecutor removed from position and reinstated the case. The new provincial prosecutor of Pampanga rejected Soriano's defense that the accusations against him were “fabricated, baseless and malicious.” He claims that the new prosecutor was backed by the Iglesia ni Cristo.

Soriano and two others were charged with falsification of public document at the Manila City Prosecutor's Office for allegedly faking the certificate of detention in order to post bail for his rape charges. Investigation showed that Soriano never surrendered nor was he arrested or detained at the Pandacan station on June 21, but a certificate of detention was still issued on his behalf by Pandacan Police Officer June 3 Gumaru, said Criminal Investigation and Detection Group-Manila chief Superintendent Joaquin Alva. Soriano was indicted for the rape of his male follower at the regional trial court of Macabebe, Pampanga, was sued for violation of Article 171 of the Revised Penal Code, along with a Pandacan police officer and a bondswoman.

== Conflict with Muslims ==
On April 3, 2005, Muslim leaders in Manila filed a 1-billion peso libel suit against Soriano for allegedly disparaging Islam and Muslims in general, citing videos of him released to members of MCGI. The video was characterized as malicious, showing Soriano making irresponsible remarks and imputations of crimes against Muslims, exposing the Islamic religion "to public contempt and ridicule". Soriano claimed the conflict was caused by the videos aired in Ang Tamang Daan, saying the videos were not his.

== Incident in Apalit ==
2005 Apalit Brawl
- Part of Conflicts between Iglesia ni Cristo and Members Church of God International
- Date: April 18, 2005
- Location: Apalit, Pampanga, Philippines
- Caused by: Both parties were trying to draft out terms/initiate a religious debate
- Goals: Proving which sect was "true"
- Result: Group of Church of God members badly injured

Parties
Iglesia ni Cristo members	Church of God members

Lead figures
an alleged relative of Marcos Mataro	Marcos Mataro

Number
unknown	approximately 20-30

Casualties
- Death: 0
- Injuries: 20-40

On April 18, 2005, MCGI members headed by former INC member Marcos Mataro scuffled after a scheduled religious debate with members of INC in a Jollibee outlet in Apalit, Pampanga. Apalit Mayor Tirso Lacanilao said "scores were injured", but that there were no serious injuries. The MCGI radio program Ang Dating Daan (ADD) and Iglesia Ni Cristo had been trading accusations in their respective television programs. This had even led to an exchange of lawsuits. It was reported that the clash began when an ADD follower identified only as "Mataro" provoked INC followers.

Local police, on orders of the town mayor had gone to the restaurant and tried to stop the debate for lack of a mayor's permit. The police had been instructed to transfer the venue of the debate either at the ADD convention center or at the INC chapel in an effort to prevent any trouble. Mataro insisted on pushing through with the debate, however, assuring no trouble. Leaders of the MCGI group said they do not trust the local policemen. Mataro shouted, which reportedly provoked the INC members to a confrontation, and led to a free-for-all.

On April 27, 2008, Mataro was shot dead by two unknown assailants in San Simon, Pampanga. Murder charges were filed against Nickson Icao and Felizardo Lumagham, both of Macabebe, Pampanga and alleged members of INC, before the San Fernando prosecutor's office. Mataro's killing could also be linked to his pending attempted homicide case before the Apalit Municipal Trial Court and Quezon City Regional Trial Court.

== Current relations ==
After the suspension of Ang Dating Daan and following multiple court cases, MCGI programs eased in criticizing the INC and slowly started focusing on general preaching. Soriano went into exile arising from charges of sexual assault in Brazil where he would succumb to his death on February 10, 2021 never to have returned to the Philippines. The Ang Tamang Daan in turn changed its format and has since introduced new hosts, currently focusing on criticizing the beliefs of other religions rather than to explain their own doctrines.

=== Soriano and Leila de Lima ===
In August 2015, Soriano expressed his support for Former Justice Secretary and former Senator Leila De Lima on his Twitter account, during the protest held by the INC urging De Lima to resign due to alleged VIP treatment to former INC Minister Isaias Samson during the controversy in the church brought about by Eraño's widow Cristina and son Angel Manalo who were then expelled from the INC. In October 2015, Daniel Razon did an interview with Atty. Trixie Cruz-Angeles about the case filed by Lowell Menorca II.

=== Bong Go's double event ===
On May 6, 2018, Former Special Assistant to the President (now Senator) Bong Go attend the double event in two rival religious groups with a coincidence opposing two senators on a separate events. INC's Worldwide Walk to Fight Poverty (with Senator JV Ejercito) and MCGI's UNTV Cup Executive Face Off 2018 (with Senator Joel Villanueva, who is a member of JIL Worldwide).

=== Ang Tamang Daan returns the original format ===
After a 12 year hiatus, in October 2018, Ang Tamang Daan returned to its original format along with the original hosts of the program including Michael Sandoval.
