= Itanong mo kay Soriano =

Radio show in the Philippines

- Genre: Religious broadcasting
- Presented by: Eli Soriano; Daniel Razon
- Country of origin: Philippines
- Original languages: Tagalog, English, Portuguese, Spanish

Production
- Producer: Members Church of God International
- Camera setup: multicamera setup
- Running time: 2 hours

Original release
- Network: UNTV (since 2004)
- Release: 1993 – present

Related
- Ang Dating Daan

Itanong mo kay Soriano
- Genre: Religious broadcasting
- Running time: 2 hours
- Country of origin: Philippines
- Languages: Tagalog, English
- Home station: Radio La Verdad 1350
- Hosted by: Eli Soriano; Daniel Razon
- Produced by: Members Church of God International
- Recording studio: Florianópolis, SC, Brazil
- Original release: 2012 – present
- Audio format: Stereo
- Podcast: The Old Path; The Unheard Truth

Itanong mo kay Soriano, Biblia ang Sasagot (transl. Ask Bro Eli, the Bible Will Answer!) also known as Ang Dating Daan: Bible Exposition is a religious radio and television program in the Philippines produced by the Members Church of God International and hosted by Bro. Eli Soriano. Unlike its sister program, Ang Dating Daan: Worldwide Bible Study and Mass Indoctrination, the program features a question and answer format in which any visitor in the show can ask Soriano about biblical teachings. In the Philippines, the broadcast of this program takes place right after Ang Dating Daan and it became a separate show in 1993. In the other countries, however, this show is part of the TV program O Caminho Antigo which is also hosted by Soriano. He regularly conducts "Bible Expositions" in specific venues (stadiums, public places, etc.) where the people can ask him personally on biblical issues, the Exposition is then recorded and broadcast as this show.

== Status ==
Currently, Itanong mo kay Soriano airs in 73 countries worldwide including United States and other English-speaking countries (as Ask Bro Eli, the Bible will Answer), Brazil and Portugal (as Pergunte ao Irmão Eli Soriano, A Bíblia Respondera), Spain and Latin América (as Pregúntele al Hermano Eli Soriano, La Biblia Responderá) and also in India, South Africa, Saipan.

The program has been the subject of notable parodies on Filipino comedy shows, particularly the recurring Bubble Gang sketch "Ang Dating Doon"—where the host derives the answers to audience questions from nursery rhymes and song lyrics rather than bible verses. Soriano did not mind the satire, as he believed that it had boosted the popularity of the original show.

== Suspension of broadcasting rights ==
In 2005, the Movie and Television Review and Classification Board (MTRCB, Philippines) banned Soriano's programs (including this one) because of statements made by Soriano against the Iglesia ni Cristo (INC), and the MTRCB. He was prohibited from uttering libellous and defamatory statements against INC. Soriano had used terms like iglesiang pumapatay ng kapwa tao (church who murders) and iglesia ni Manalo (church of Manalo) to malign the INC in his programs. The Philippine's Commission on Human Rights, urged Soriano to file charges against the MTRCB. The CHR ruled that Soriano's "freedom of speech and religion" was violated by the MTRCB's suspension order.

== Related Shows ==
- Ang Dating Daan: Worldwide Bible Study
- Ang Dating Daan: Mass Indoctrination

== Awards ==
Year	Association	Category	Nominee(s)	Result
2016	AnakTV	AnakTV Seal Award	Itanong mo kay Soriano	Awarded
2018	AnakTV	AnakTV Seal Award	Itanong mo kay Soriano	Awarded

== See also ==
- Religion in the Philippines
- List of televangelists in Brazil
- D'X-Man
