= Ang Dating Daan =

Philippine television and religious program

- Other names: The Old Path; O Caminho Antigo; El Camino Antiguo
- Genre: Religious broadcasting
- Running time: 2 hours
- Country of origin: Philippines
- Languages: Filipino; English
- Home station: Radio La Verdad 1350 kHz (2011–present)
- TV adaptations: Ang Dating Daan
- Hosted by: Eli Soriano; Daniel Razon
- Created by: Members Church of God International
- Produced by: Members Church of God International
- Recording studio: MCGI Building, Florianópolis, SC, Brazil, MCGI compound, Apalit, Pampanga, Philippines
- Original release: October 1980
- Audio format: Stereo
- Website: www.angdatingdaan.org
- Podcast: MCGI Channel

Ang Dating Daan (English: The Old Path, Portuguese: O Caminho Antigo, Spanish: El Camino Antiguo) was a religious radio and television program produced by the Members Church of God International. It is primarily hosted by Brother Eli Soriano that began in the last quarter of 1980. It has been recognized as one of the longest-running religious television programs in the World. The name of the program is based on Jeremiah 6:16 of the Bible.

While mainly broadcasting in Tagalog (Filipino), some English language elements were added for foreign viewers, including "Truth in Focus", "Biblically Speaking", "How Authentic the Bible is", and "Bible Guide". It also features the use of multi-lingual and multi-dialectic translations of the Bible. Selected episodes of the program can also be viewed on the Internet through the Members Church of God International websites and on YouTube. There were episodes available in DVD format.

In Portugal and Brazil, it is currently broadcast as O Caminho Antigo which is a direct translation for The Old Path which the same name is being broadcast in North America including English-speaking countries. In Latin America including Spain, it is currently broadcast as El Camino Antiguo which is also a direct translation of the English name. In Italy, it is also being broadcast as Il Sentiero Antico which is also a direct translation of the Filipino name.

Ang Dating Daan is currently airing in 73 countries worldwide and translated in at least 18 languages, including in the United States, United Kingdom (as "The Old Path"), Brazil, Portugal, Mozambique (as "O Caminho Antigo"), Spain, Latin America (as "El Camino Antiguo"), Italy (as "Il Sentiero Antico"), Taiwan (as "古道"), India (as "प्राचीन मार्ग "), Nepal (as "प्राचिन मार्ग बाइबल"), Sri Lanka (as "පැරණි මාර්ගය"), Germany (as "Der Alte Pfad"), France, Haiti (as "L'Ancien Chemin"), Ghana (as "Tete Atempɔn"), Malaysia (as "Jalan Yang Dahulukala"), Japan (as "昔の道"), Papua New Guinea (as "Olpela Rot"), South Africa, Saipan.

== Background ==
=== Pre-Broadcast ===
Bro. Eli Soriano was baptized on April 7, 1964, at the age of 17. He expressed desire to become a church worker and soon attended ministerial classes under Bro. Nicolás Pérez. In 1970s, Soriano began conducting nightly pulong (gathering) from town-to-town preaching in the province of Pampanga and later realized that his lifetime is not enough to reach the entire Philippines. In the year 1972, Pérez handed Soriano the only Church Minister title.

Soriano was a multilingual Christian preacher who spoke Kapampangan and Tagalog as his native languages. He was also fluent in English, Portuguese, and Spanish, all of which he used in his international ministry, particularly during his years in Brazil. In addition to these languages, he studied Koine Greek and Biblical Hebrew for biblical exegesis and frequently referred to the original biblical texts in his sermons, debates, and question-and-answer programs.

=== Radio Broadcast ===
Ang Dating Daan
- Genre: Religious broadcasting
- Running time: 2 hours
- Country of origin: Philippines
- Home station: DWWA; DWAR; DZME; DZMB; DWAD; DZRD; DZRH (1998–2013); RMN; Radyo Natin (1998–2013); Radyo La Verdad (2011–present)
- Hosted by: Eli Soriano; Daniel Razon
- Created by: MCGI Productions; Members Church of God International
- Original release: October 1980 – present
- No. of episodes: n/a (airs daily)

Ang Dating Daan is a Philippine radio religious program by DWWA 1206 kHz, and was also broadcast on DWAR, DZME, DZMB, DWAD, DZRD, DZRH, RMN, Radyo Natin and DZXQ. It premiered on DWWA in October 1980. Also broadcast on DWAR, DZME, DZMB, DWAD, DZRD, and DZXQ (which is now known as Radyo La Verdad). From 1998 to 2013, the radio program started to broadcast with different radio stations in the Philippines including DZRH, RMN and 100 Radyo Natin FM Stations and local radio stations across the country. The program is now in its new home Radyo La Verdad 1350 since late 2011.

=== Television Broadcast ===
Ang Dating Daan
- Genre: Religious broadcasting
- Presented by: Eli Soriano; Daniel Razon
- Country of origin: Philippines
- Original languages: Filipino; English; Portuguese; Spanish; and other available languages

Production
- Producer: Members Church of God International
- Camera setup: multicamera setup
- Running time: 2 hours
- Production company: MCGI Productions

Original release
- Network: IBC/Islands TV 13 (1983–1997); New Vision 9/RPN (1992–1996); RJTV (1997–1999); PTV (1999–2000, 2013); SBN (2000–2004); UNTV (2004–present); TV Natin/RHTV/DZRH News Television (2007–2013)
- Release: 1983 – present

Related
- Itanong mo kay Soriano; Truth in Focus

Ang Dating Daan is a Philippine television religious program by IBC/Islands TV 13, New Vision 9/RPN, PTV, SBN, UNTV and TV Natin/RHTV/DZRH News Television. It aired on IBC/Islands TV 13 from 1983 to 1997, when program started on television broadcast as a 30-minute blocktimer with a shoe-string budget. The program then ran for one hour due to limited funds. Also broadcast on New Vision 9/RPN from 1992 to 1996. The program moved to RJTV from 1997 to 1999, PTV from 1999 to 2000 and SBN from 2000 to 2004. The program currently airs live via satellite through the facilities of UNTV since 2004 and it became the program's permanent home through multi-year contract and formerly aired on TV Natin/RHTV/DZRH News Television from October 2007 to 2013.

Other broadcast technology like satellite (through GlobeCast, MEASAT-3a, etc.), cable television (such as Sky Cable, Destiny Cable, etc.) were also added to further reach more including direct-to-home satellite (such as Cignal and Sky Direct) broadcast and digital TV broadcast.

=== Print Media ===
Print media is also used to propagate the Ang Dating Daan (The Old Path) program through the Magandang Balita (Good News) newspaper that is being distributed in Metro Manila. Online media is also used in the propagation like blogging through Controversy Extraordinary where Soriano is the author of the blog. His latest publication of Walking the Old Path: 12 Biblical Lessons on Faith, Hope, and Love from the Life of Bro. Eli is now available on Google Books.

=== Online Broadcast ===
==== Internet Broadcast ====
In the year 1999, the program launched its own website on the Internet. It opened a new venue to connect people across the planet. It was in the year 2000 when the program started its video live streaming through the Internet, hence, the video streaming technology was born.

==== Social Media Broadcast ====
The program also began to take advantage of technology using social media platforms in late 2005. On June 1, 2020, the program introduced for the first time to the public the Ang Dating Daan Live Mass Indoctrination through social media platforms as the world including the Philippines prepare for the new normal.

===== YouTube =====
On December 27, 2005, the Members Church of God International released a YouTube channel of the program in Filipino. A few days later, ''The Old Path'', the English version of the program was also released, followed by El Camino Antiguo, the Spanish version of the program on December 30, 2009. In 2013 and 2014, they released the Portuguese and Swahili version of the program, respectively.

In September 2021, the YouTube Channel name Ang Dating Daan was renamed as MCGI Channel.

===== Facebook =====
In December 2008, the program released its official Facebook page. On June 10, 2016, the program debut its first Live Facebook broadcast.

===== Twitter =====
Its official Twitter account was started in October 2010 and was later being used to propagate the program including Bible Expositions and Bible Studies.

===== Instagram =====
Its official Instagram account in Tagalog was started in July 2015. it was then followed by different Instagram accounts in different languages.

===== TikTok =====
In 2021, the program has also been launched on TikTok.

=== Mobile app ===
In 2014, the Members Church of God International introduced the "MCGI Broadcast" mobile application. The app features 24/7 Broadcast of Ang Dating Daan and its foreign versions. In September 2018, the church launched the ''Ang Dating Daan TV'' mobile application. The app features questions and answers about the Bible. It uses Tagalog, English, Spanish and Portuguese languages.

Application(s)	Platform(s)	Download Link(s)
MCGI Broadcast	Apple iOS	Apple iTunes Store
MCGI Broadcast	Google Android	Google Play Store
MCGI Broadcast	Microsoft Windows Mobile	Microsoft Store
Ang Dating Daan TV	Google Android	Google Play Store

=== Podcast ===
MCGI Channel (also known as The Old Path)
- Genre: Religious broadcasting
- Language: English; Filipino

Creative team
- Created by: Members Church of God International

Cast and voices
- Hosted by: Eli Soriano; Daniel Razon

Production
- Production: MCGI Productions

Technical specifications
- Audio format: mp3

Publication
- No. of seasons: N/A
- Original release: October 2019

Related
- Website: Spotify

In October 2019, A Spotify podcast of the program was launched.

In last quarter of 2021, the religious podcast show was renamed as MCGI Channel.

== Ang Dating Daan segments ==
- Ang Dating Daan: Bible Exposition

It is commonly known for its tagline as Itanong mo kay Soriano, Biblia ang Sasagot! It features a question and answer format in which any visitor in the show can ask about biblical teachings. In the middle week of February 2021, the Live Bible Exposition as for now are pre-recorded broadcast on social media platforms because of the passing of Brother Eli Soriano.

- Ang Dating Daan: Worldwide Bible Study

It discusses various biblical topics about faith and the Bible.

- Ang Dating Daan: Mass Indoctrination

It is a series of month-long biblical sessions of different topics where the basic teachings and beliefs of the Christian faith are taught prior to joining the church. On June 1, 2020, the program introduced for the first time to the public the Ang Dating Daan Live Mass Indoctrination through social media platforms as the world including the Philippines prepare for the new normal. In 2022, ADD Mass Indoctrination to MCGI Mass Indoctrination because it is pre recorded broadcast now on social media platforms.

== Awards ==
Gawad Amerika Awards in November 2006 awarded "Most Informative Religious Program of the Year" to Ang Dating Daan for its North American broadcast.

== Anniversary ==
On its 35th anniversary, Ang Dating Daan held a special anniversary presentation last October 12, 2015, at the Smart Araneta Coliseum featuring the Ang Dating Daan Chorale. In line with the theme "Truth. Charity. Praise.", the Ang Dating Daan Chorale serenaded special guests mainly persons with disabilities (PWDs) with the best songs of praises and thanksgiving to the Almighty God for all the success of Ang Dating Daan. It was aired live via satellite and over the internet exclusively in over 1,360 monitoring centers of Ang Dating Daan centers worldwide. It also marked the official attempt of MCGI to break the Guinness world record for the "Largest Gospel Choir in a Single Location." Under the supervision of Guinness official adjudicator and independent auditing firm Punongbayan & Araullo Grant Thorton, the Guinness world record was awarded to MCGI with a total of 8,688 choristers from the ADD Chorale beating the previous record held by the Philippine religious group Iglesia ni Cristo with 4,745 participants during their 100th centennial anniversary at the Philippine Arena.

== Suspension of broadcasting rights ==
On August 16, 2004, the Movie and Television Review and Classification Board (MTRCB) preventively suspended the showing of the Ang Dating Daan program for 20 days due to slander and use of offensive and obscene language by its televangelist host Eli Soriano, as a means of disciplinary action.

On September 27, 2004, the MTRCB extended the suspension to three months. Soriano challenged the action in court, arguing that the suspension imposed by the MTRCB constituted prior restraint on the media and that his language during the show's August 10, 2004, broadcast was not obscene and offensive. The court dismissed his case in favor of MTRCB.

In June 2005, Soriano filed a motion by recommendation of the Commission on Human Rights, saying the MTRCB violated the "right to information, communication and religion" of every Filipino. On April 29, 2009, The Supreme Court upheld the suspension imposed by the MTRCB, ruling that Soriano's statements can be treated as obscene and cannot be considered as protected speech.

Soriano filed a motion seeking the reversal of its April 2009 decision. The Supreme Court denied Soriano's motion and affirmed the decision with finality in 2010 by an 11–4 vote, noting that "it is a sanction that the MTRCB may validly impose under its charter without running afoul of the free speech clause." The high court reminded Soriano that his program, being aired on television, is accessible to children of all ages and therefore not appropriate for a program with a "G" or for general audience rating due to his use of vulgar language and invectives.

== See also ==
- Religion in the Philippines
- D'X-Man
- Daniel Razon
- Conflicts between Iglesia ni Cristo and Members Church of God International
