= Tipi (disambiguation) =

Tipi (also tepee and teepee) is a dwelling used by North American Indians of the Great Plains.

Tipi, Tepee, Teepee or Tee pee may also refer to:

- Tipi: Home of the Nomadic Buffalo Hunters, an illustrated children's book
- The Lone Teepee, a landmark along the Seventh Cavalry's march to the Battle of the Little Big Horn
- Teepee Airport, Alberta, Canada
- Tepee Buttes, a range in North Dakota
- Teepee Creek, Alberta, Canada
- Teepee burners, a type of wood waste burner
- Tee Pee Records
- The Tepee, listed on the U.S. National Register of Historic Places
- Teepee structure, a geological structure

== See also ==
- TP (disambiguation)
- Tippi (disambiguation)
