= ADD Convention Center =

Convention center in Pampanga, Philippines

MCGI Convention Center
- Pasalamatán
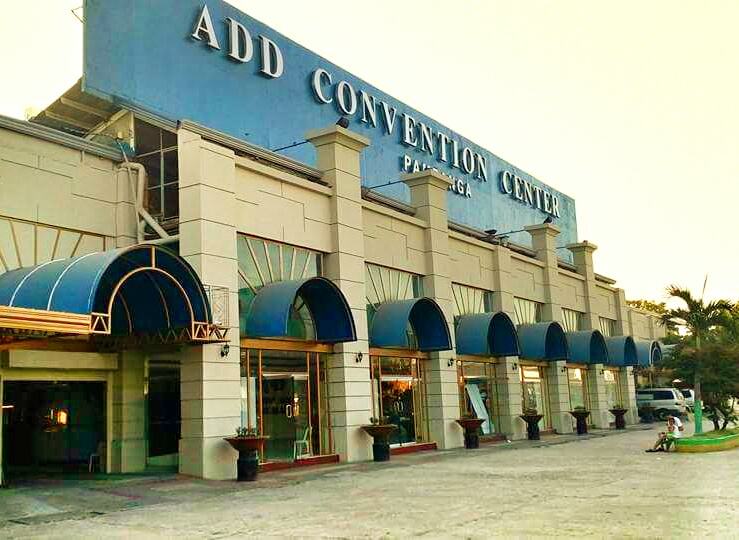
- Western entrance
- Interactive map of MCGI Convention Center
- Former names: ADD Convention Center
- Location: MacArthur Highway, Sampaloc, Apalit, Pampanga, Philippines
- Coordinates: 14°57′35.3″N 120°45′41.1″E
- Capacity: 100,000
- Type: convention center, multi-purpose hall

Website
- www.mcgi.org

The Members Church of God International (MCGI) Convention Center also known as Pasalamatán and ADD Convention Center in Tagalog is an open-type, multi-purpose convention center owned by the Members Church of God International (MCGI), a Philippine-based Christian religious organization. It is located inside the 58-hectare MCGI Compound along MacArthur Highway in Brgy. Sampaloc, Apalit, Pampanga, Philippines. MCGI is also known in the Philippines as Ang Dating Daan or "ADD" (English: "The Old Path"), the title of its flagship radio and television program.

== Background ==
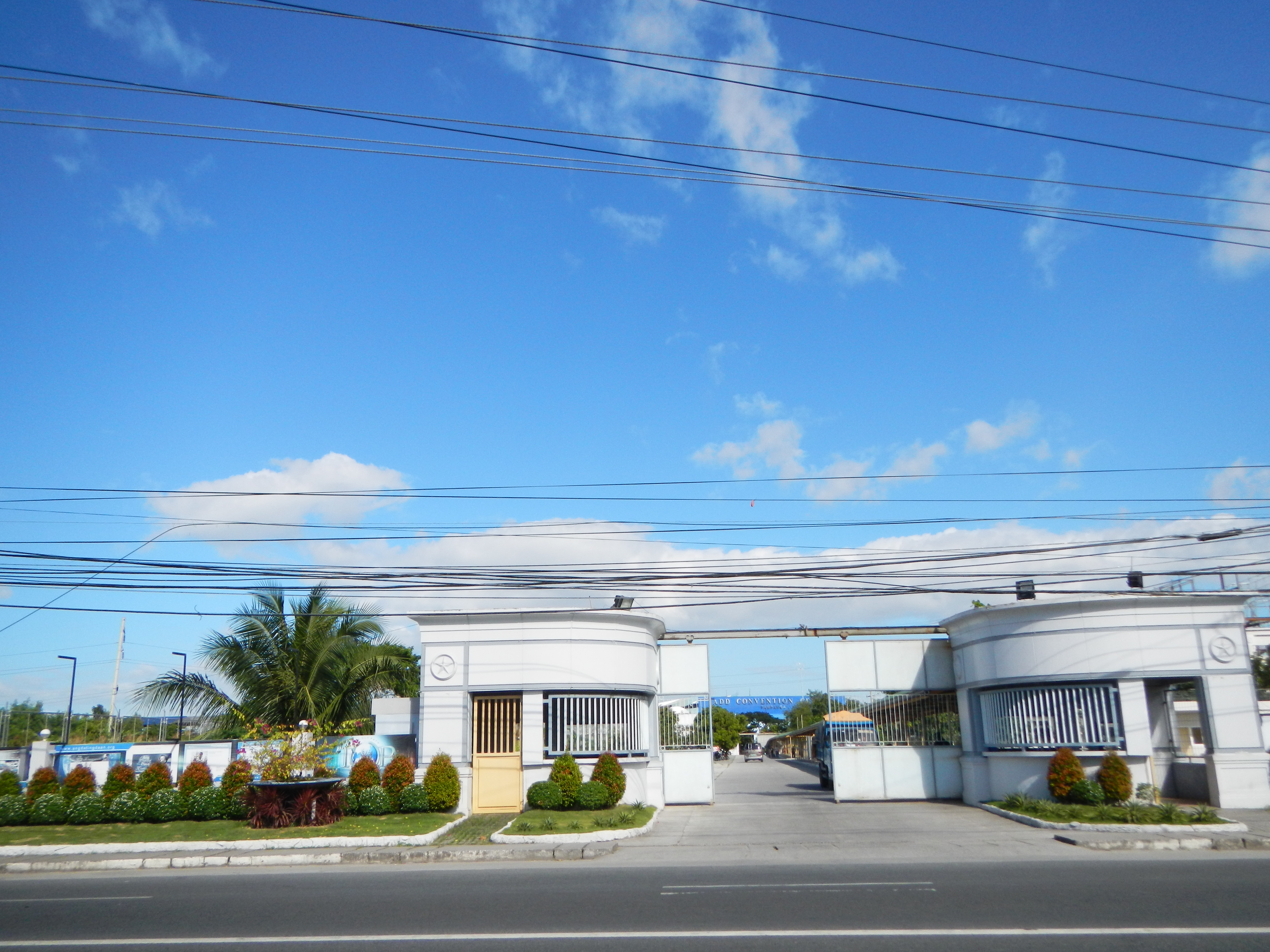
Façade of the gate of the ADD Convention Center in 2012.

In the mid 1990s, the church left its old headquarters (also known as "Old Central") in Brgy. San Vicente, a flood-prone area in Apalit and relocated to a bigger space. A ₱50 million loan was obtained by the church to acquire and develop a <60-hectare lot in Brgy. Sampaloc in Apalit into a mixed-use community. The ADD Central Headquarters houses the ADD Convention Center, 5,000-capacity chapel, baptistry, MCGI Central Administration Office, dormitories for church officers and volunteers, orphanages, infirmary, transient home, houses for the ministers and workers and school buildings for MCGI's tertiary institution, the La Verdad Christian College.

== Infrastructure ==
The 100,000-capacity steel-metal ADD Convention Center was built on a 1.5-hectare land mass. Its construction began sometime in the 1990s. It was expanded first in 1999 then in 2004, where the oval arena was built, adding more parking spaces and more area for the church members. The development continues until today.

Major church gatherings such as the quarterly 3-day International Thanksgiving to God (also known in Tagalog as Special Pasalamat ng Buong Bayan or SPBB) and the weekly Thanksgiving to God (Tagalog: Pasalamat sa Dios) are held every Saturday. It is also the venue of regular church services such as monthly Special Prayer Meetings (SPM), Worldwide Bible Expositions and baptism of new members.

It also hosts other special events of the church such as the bi-annual A Song of Praise (ASOP) Music Festival and anniversaries of the Ang Dating Daan television program. Also included were sports activities, conferences, meetings and benefit concerts.

== Features ==
=== La Verdad Christian College - Apalit Campus ===
The La Verdad Christian College Auditorium which aims to provide its students academic and extracurricular needs was inaugurated in June 2017.

=== Walk of Faith ===
Inside the center, it features "Walk of Faith" which was inaugurated last 30 April 2018. It features a series of stone tablets inscribed with the names of heroes of faith and their most well-known acts of obedience to and trust in God. The stone tablets line up along the outer ring of the fountain. Also a dancing fountain with the tunes of originally-composed church songs of praise and faith.

=== Other Developments ===
The convention center is on full-swing for the development. This includes the new ADD Convention Center, the MCGI Chapel, La Verdad Diagnostic Center, new MCGI Administration Office, new MCGI Broadcast Transmission Control Tower, motor pool area, charity home for the elderly and minors and home subdivision.

== Local convention centers ==
MCGI established local churches (also known as ADD Coordinating Centers) in communities throughout the Philippines and abroad where members attend regular church services and conduct indoctrination sessions. These include local ADD convention centers with bigger seating capacity and equipped with satellite dish to receive live and exclusive broadcast feed from ADD Convention Center in Apalit, Pampanga via Measat-3A satellite.

- Aguinaldo Highway, Biga 2, Silang, Cavite
- San Roque, Sto. Tomas, Batangas
- Brgy. Parian, Calamba, Laguna
- Imelda Avenue, Cainta, Rizal
- Velasquez St., Bangiad, Taytay, Rizal
- Brgy. San Roque, Cebu City
- Montilla Boulevard, Butuan City
