= Tippi =

Tippi or Tippie can refer to:

- Tippi (name), list of people with the name
- Tepi, Ethiopia, a town in Ethiopia
  - Tippi Airport, a former airport
- Tippie College of Business, University of Iowa, United States
- Tippi, a diacritic used in the Gurmukhi script

== See also ==
- Tippy (disambiguation)
