= D'X-Man =

- Also known as: The Ex-Manalista
- Genre: Religious broadcasting
- Starring: Various former Iglesia ni Cristo members
- Country of origin: Philippines
- Original language: Filipino (with English subtitles)

Production
- Producer: Members Church of God International
- Production locations: ADD Convention Center, Apalit, Pampanga Province, Luzon, Philippines
- Camera setup: multicamera setup
- Running time: 30 Minutes
- Production company: MCGI Productions

Original release
- Network: UNTV
- Release: October 11, 2004 – September 17, 2023

D’X-Man (short for The Ex-Manalista) is a 30 minute expository-religious program emanating broadcast by UNTV. It was conceptualized by Bro. Eli Soriano and Kuya Daniel Razon, Overall Servants of the Members Church of God International, Everynight at 11:30 PM. It aired from October 11, 2004 to July 2, 2017. The show returned from August 22, 2017 to September 17, 2023.

== Counterprogram ==
As the program criticizes the Iglesia ni Cristo doctrines, the Iglesia ni Cristo launched their own programs Ang Tamang Daan on June 11, 2001, and Ang Mga Nagsialis sa Samahang Ang Dating Daan, in 2006, featuring former MCGI-turned INC members. These counter programs criticize the doctrines of the Members Church of God International, their church and its leader.

=== Mataro's death ===
On April 27, 2008, Bro. Marcos Mataro, who was then the host of this show, was shot dead by two unknown assailants in San Simon, Pampanga. MCGI members have accused the INC of being behind the murder as Mataro's TV program, D'X-Man (short for The Ex-Manalista), was critical of the Iglesia ni Cristo doctrines. Murder charges were filed against the principal suspects in the killing. Nickson Icao and Felizardo "Ka Zaldy" Lumagham, both of Macabebe, Pampanga and who claim to be members of INC, were charged before the San Fernando prosecutors office.

== Hosts ==
Current hosts

- Bro. Arnel (2004–2017, 2017-2023)
- Sis. Nedie Espanol (2004–2017, 2017-2023)
- Sis. Jane (2004–2017, 2017-2023)
- Sis. Jayrell De Jesus (2004–2017, 2017-2023)
- Bro. Matthew Gulle (2004–2017, 2017-2023)
- Bro. Ladie Sibug (2004–2017, 2017-2023)
- Bro. Larry Erfilo (2004–2017, 2017-2023)
- Sis. Lydia Manuyag (2004–2017, 2017-2023)
- Bro. Cesar Adamos (2004–2017, 2017-2023)

Former host

- Bro. Marcos Mataro† (2004–2008)
- Bro. Manny Jusay† (2004–2017, 2017-2018)

== Awards ==
Year	Association	Category	Nominee(s)	Result
2011	AnakTV	AnakTV Seal Award	D'X-Man	Awarded
