= Tippy =

Tippy is a nickname and given name, the latter for fictional characters. It may refer to:

== People ==
- Tippy D'Auria (born 1935), American amateur astronomer
- Tippy Barton, a stage name of Josh White (1914–1969), American singer, guitarist, songwriter, actor and civil rights activist
- Tom Day (American football) (1935–2000), American Football League player
- Tippy Dos Santos (born 1994), Filipino-American singer and actress
- Tippy Dye (1915–2012), American college athlete, coach and athletic director
- Tippy de Lanoy Meijer (born 1943), Dutch former field hockey player
- Tippy Larkin (1917–1992), American boxer born Antonio Pilliteri
- Tippy Martinez (born 1950), American retired Major League Baseball pitcher
- Tippy Packard (born 1995), Hong Kong-American figure skater
- Tippy Walker (born 1947), American child actress

== Fictional characters ==
- Tippy (Is the Order a Rabbit?), in the manga series Is the Order a Rabbit?
- Tippy Dink, in the American animated TV series Doug
- The title character of the 2003 American children's book Tippy Lemmey
- Tippy Tinkletrousers, a villain in the Captain Underpants children's novel series

== See also ==
- Tippi (disambiguation)
