= Eli Soriano =

Filipino television evangelist (1947–2021)

Bro. Eli Soriano
- Overall Servant (formerly "Presiding Minister")
- Predecessor: Nicolas Perez (Note: The Members Church of God International recognized Nicolas Perez, who was the presiding minister of the Iglesia ng Dios kay Kristo Hesus, Haligi at Suhay ng Katotohanan, as their former Overall Servant and Soriano's predecessor)
- Successor: Daniel Razon

Personal details
- Born: Eliseo Fernando Soriano; April 4, 1947 Pasay, Rizal, Philippines
- Died: February 10, 2021 (aged 73) Santa Catarina, Brazil
- Denomination: Members Church of God International

YouTube information
- Channel: Brother Eli Channel
- Years active: 2021–present (via archive footage); 1980–2021
- Genre: Religious
- Subscribers: 226 thousand
- Views: 24.7 million
- Last updated: September 18, 2021
- Website: www.elisoriano.com

Eliseo "Eli" Fernando Soriano (Tagalog pronunciation: [ˈʔɛli soɾˈjano]; April 4, 1947 – February 10, 2021) (Note: Or February 11, 2021 (UTC+8).) was a Filipino preacher and televangelist. He was the "Overall Servant" (Tagalog: Lingkod Pangkalahatan, formerly called "Presiding Minister") of the Members Church of God International (MCGI), an international Christian religious organization with headquarters in Apalit, Pampanga, Philippines. He was the main host of the radio and television program Ang Dating Daan (English: The Old Path, Portuguese: O Caminho Antigo, Spanish: El Camino Antiguo), which is considered as the longest-running religious program in the Philippines.

Soriano was known for his signature method of "Bible Expositions". It is a live Bible symposium where guests get the chance to ask impromptu questions personally or via live video streaming or telephone calls.

He was also known for straightforward preaching of what they believed are doctrinal errors of various local and international religious groups. He also had numerous religious debates with different church ministers, apologists and pastors. He was also known for the phrase "Kung mabasa ko?" ("What if I read it?"), which he used during debates when challenging his opponents to acknowledge that they were mistaken if he could cite the relevant passage from the Bible.

An incident when he used a defamatory word in his television show consequently led to a three-month suspension of the program in a case that went to the Supreme Court of the Philippines.

Soriano was a multilingual Christian preacher who spoke Kapampangan and Tagalog as his First language. He was also fluent in English, Portuguese, and Spanish, all of which he used in his international ministry, particularly during his years in Brazil. In addition to these languages, he used Koine Greek and Biblical Hebrew for biblical exegesis and frequently referred to the original biblical texts in his sermons, debates, and question-and-answer programs.

== Early years ==
Eliseo Fernando Soriano was born to Triunfo Soriano and Catalina Fernando in Pasay, Philippines, and is the seventh of eight children. He grew up in Pampanga. He started school at the age of eight.

Soriano was supposed to receive the highest honors of the school, but he dropped out three months before graduation due to an alleged religious debate between Soriano and the school administrator. On April 7, 1964, three days after his 17th birthday, Soriano was baptized in Seneguelasan, Bacoor, Cavite, and became an official member of the Iglesia ng Dios kay Kristo Hesus, Haligi at Suhay ng Katotohanan (Church of God in Christ Jesus, Pillar and Support of the Truth) headed by Nicolas Perez where his parents were also members.

== Ministry ==
=== Appointed minister ===
In 1969, Nicolas Antiporda Perez, who was then the church's presiding minister, bestowed upon Soriano the title "minister", making him the only minister in the Iglesia ng Dios kay Kristo Hesus, Haligi at Suhay ng Katotohanan at that time. Rumors were circulating that Soriano was going to be Perez's successor. However, after the death of Nicolas Perez in 1975, Levita Gugulan was appointed temporary Presiding General Secretary of the group. Soriano initially accepted the appointment of Gugulan but subsequently denounced her leadership stating that women should not be leaders of the church according to the Bible.

=== Schism ===
In 1976, Soriano and his allies left Gugulan's sect. In 1977, Soriano registered a new group, called Iglesia ng Dios kay Kristo Hesus, Haligi at Saligan ng Katotohanan (Church of God in Christ Jesus, Pillar and Ground of Truth), which was later changed to Mga Kaanib sa Iglesia ng Dios kay Kristo Hesus, Haligi at Saligan ng Katotohanan sa Bansang Pilipinas (Members of the Church of God in Christ Jesus, Pillar and Ground of Truth, Philippines).

Because of the similarity between the name used by Gugulan's group and Soriano's group, the former filed a suit, which was resolved by the Supreme Court of the Philippines in 2001 in favor of Gugulan's group and Soriano's group was ordered to change their church's name. In 2004, Soriano's group changed their church's name to Members Church of God International.

=== Ang Dating Daan ===
Before starting his flagship TV program, Soriano would preach in different towns and municipalities in the Philippines. In 1980, Soriano started the radio program, Ang Dating Daan, which later became a television program in 1983. In 1983, Soriano was invited as a panelist in GMA-7's inter-religious program, Dis [This] is Manolo and His Genius Family. He, along with other representatives of religious groups, would debate and defend their beliefs in the show. Soriano won and was awarded "Most Outstanding Gospel Minister of the Year 1983". Soon, Soriano would receive multiple awards from different charity organizations, notably as Bayani ng Lahing Kayumanggi (Hero of the Brown Race).

On January 20, 1999, Soriano was invited to be the guest in Korina Sanchez's talk show Balitang K (K News). There Soriano admitted that the Ang Dating Doon skit from the GMA sketch comedy show Bubble Gang, which is a parody of his Ang Dating Daan program, actually helped raise its popularity. Conversely, Isko Salvador–who went by the stage name "Brod. Pete" as a play on American actor Brad Pitt–expressed his appreciation towards Soriano in an interview with UNTV News, stating that Ang Dating Daan helped him better understand the Bible. Salvador cited Soriano's sense of humor and ability to interpret and explain the scripture for creating the Ang Dating Doon skit.

In 1999, Ang Dating Daan launched its website, www.angdatingdaan.org, as an online resource for viewers in the Philippines and abroad. The ministry subsequently introduced webcasting through webtv.angdatingdaan.net, which provided 24-hour access to Soriano's preaching. The same year, the program began offering live video streaming over the World Wide Web, preceding the later popularity of platforms such as YouTube and other web-streaming services.

=== Exile ===
He was in exile in order to evade various death threats he received over the course of his preaching in the Philippines and the countless libel cases he faced from the people he exposed. He has since used this opportunity to preach in other countries.

Currently, Ang Dating Daan airs in 73 countries worldwide including the United States (as The Old Path), Brazil, Portugal (as O Caminho Antigo), Uruguay, Spain (as El Camino Antiguo), India, South Africa, and Saipan.

In his TV show Itanong mo kay Soriano, Biblia ang Sasagot! ("Ask Soriano, the Bible will Answer!"), he invited people to ask him any Bible-related question.

=== Use of mass media and digital platforms ===
Soriano made extensive use of mass media and digital platforms in his ministry, particularly through Ang Dating Daan and The Old Path. His programs were used for preaching, Bible studies, Bible expositions, and question-and-answer sessions. As internet access expanded, his ministry also used websites and online video platforms to make its religious programs available to audiences outside traditional broadcast media.

During the COVID-19 pandemic in 2020, Soriano's ministry further expanded its use of livestreaming. In mid-April 2020, The Old Path Live Bible studies and Bible expositions began being livestreamed daily, in addition to scheduled programs for audiences in Portugal, Brazil, Europe, Israel, Africa, the Middle East, India, Nepal, and Sri Lanka. On June 1, 2020, The Old Path Live Mass Indoctrination sessions also began streaming online. These initiatives allowed viewers confined at home during lockdowns to participate in Bible studies and other religious programs remotely.

Through these developments, Soriano's ministry progressed from television and radio broadcasting to websites, webcasting, social media, livestreaming, and online video conferences, expanding the international reach of his preaching and Bible-based programs.

=== Charitable works ===
Soriano, through the help of his nephew Daniel Razon, has been spearheading many projects for the indigent. These include free medical and dental check-ups, a free bus ride and a free transient home for homeless people. Soriano and Razon created a free college scholarship program at the La Verdad Christian College in the Philippines and Africa which provides scholarships to deserving youth.

On May 17, 2010, Soriano appeared (through a live video patch) in a concert conceptualized by Daniel Razon and was titled Protest Broadcast 3. The concert aims to help the families of the victims of the Maguindanao Massacre. The victims' representatives received the net proceeds of the concert. The media workers' orphaned children would also be granted scholarships. During his appearance, Soriano harshly criticized former Philippine President Gloria Macapagal Arroyo, whom he blamed for his legal troubles.

On August 1, 2010, Soriano-Razon's free college program would receive further financial support from the Philippine Basketball Association (PBA) through a basketball game to be played by the PBA. The game, titled "Hoopsters Meet the Legends: Kahit Isang Araw Lang" was scheduled for the Cuneta Astrodome. The teams involved were the "PBA legends", Hoopsters (led by Razon), and the KAPI team. All the net proceeds would be given to support the free college program of Soriano and Razon.

Soriano and Razon were also involved with the donation and launch of two Mobile Schools (dubbed Dunong Gulong Project) equipped with learning tools suited for the ALS (Alternative Learning System) of Philippine Education. The project was initially conceptualized during a talk between Education Secretary Br. Armin Luistro and Razon in the latter's television program Good Morning Kuya.

On November 27, 2010, Education Secretary Luistro signed a Memorandum of Agreement with Daniel Razon at the ADD Convention Center regarding the Dunong Gulong launch. The two Dunong Gulong mobile school buses were launched at the SM Mall of Asia on November 28, 2010. "And words became action." This is how Luistro described the project. He is impressed because of the support given by public service channel UNTV and the benevolent group, the Ang Dating Daan then headed by Soriano, to the anti-illiteracy campaign of the Philippines.

== Death ==
Soriano died on February 10, 2021, in Santa Catarina, Brazil at the age of 73. The Members Church of God International released a statement on the same day announcing his demise, but did not state his cause of death.

== Legacy ==
Soriano became known for his participation in religious debates and public discussions with preachers and representatives of different Christian denominations. He addressed questions concerning biblical interpretation, doctrine, and religious practice. Among the more notable programs and public forums in which he participated were Dis is Manolo, Debate with Mare at Pare, and Dong Puno Live, alongside numerous other debates and discussions held throughout his career.

Soriano frequently participated in public religious debates, including televised debates and other public forums. He debated church leaders, pastors, Catholic priests, Christian apologists, lawyers, and politicians. His debate opponents included Fr. Anton Pascual, Rev. Msgr. Nico Bautista, Fr. Robert Reyes, Roberto Pagdanganan, Msgr. Moises Andrade, Benny Abante, Etta Rosales, Manuel Morato, Roger Arienda, Most Rev. Teodoro Bacani Jr., Dr. Grady S. McMurtry, Froilan Garza, Mitch Vickers, Pastor Rubens Sodré, Willy Majaducon, Elmer Albuera, Gamaliel Payawal, and Ronald Obidoz among others.

Different celebrities, religious groups and politicians including President Rodrigo Duterte sent their condolences and sympathies. They also sent messages of support and recognition of the late preacher's services and charity works. On April 4 to April 10, 2021, the Members Church of God International held a special week-long charitable event called "The Legacy Continues". The event coincided with the 57th year since the late preacher was baptized in the Church. The event included the MCGI Global Feeding Program, the opening of the MCGI Free Store branches (originally launched on March 14, 2021), a Wish Granting and a special episode of Serbisyong Bayanihan.
