= Sony Vaio TP series =

Series of living room PCs

The Sony Vaio TP series was a series of living room PCs part of Sony's Vaio line that sold from 2007 through 2008.

== Models ==
Model	Color	Processor	Memory	Storage Drive	Operating System
VGX-TP1	White	Intel Core 2 Duo 5600	2GB DDR2	300 GB HDD	Windows Vista Home Premium
VGX-TP20EB	Black	Intel Core 2 Duo T8100	2GB DDR2	500 GB HDD	Windows Vista Home Premium
VGX-TP20EW	White	Intel Core 2 Duo T8100	2GB DDR2	500 GB HDD	Windows Vista Home Premium
VGX-TP25E/B	Black	Intel Core 2 Duo T8100	4GB DDR2	500 GB HDD	Windows Vista Home Premium
