= DZRD =

Radio station in Dagupan, Philippines

Sonshine Radio Dagupan (DZRD)
Dagupan; Philippines
- Broadcast area: Pangasinan and surrounding areas
- Frequency: 981 kHz
- Branding: DZRD 981 Sonshine Radio Dagupan

Programming
- Languages: Pangasinense, Tagalog
- Format: Silent
- Network: Sonshine Radio

Ownership
- Owner: Swara Sug Media Corporation

History
- First air date: 1967 (as NBC DZRD); 1998 (as Angel Radyo); 2005 (as Sonshine Radio)
- Last air date: December 2023 (NTC suspension order)
- Former frequencies: 980 kHz (1967–1978)
- Call sign meaning: Radio Dagupan

Technical information
- Licensing authority: NTC
- Power: 10,000 watts

Links
- Website: http://dzrd981.sonshineradio.com/

DZRD (981 AM) Sonshine Radio was a radio station owned and operated by Swara Sug Media Corporation. The station's studio and transmitter are located along Catacadang Rd., Brgy. Bonuan Gueset, Dagupan.

On mid-December 2023, the station, along with the rest of the network, had its operations suspended by the National Telecommunications Commission for 30 days, through an order dated December 19 but was publicized two days later, in response to a House of Representatives resolution, in relation to the alleged franchise violations.
