= Tippi (name) =

Tippi is a feminine given name. Notable people with the name are as follows:

== People ==
- Tippi Degré (born 1990), French writer
- Tippi Hedren (born 1930), American Hollywood actress and animal rights activist
- Tippi McCullough (born 1963), American politician

== Fictional characters ==
- Tippi, character in Satisfaction (Australian TV series)
- Tippi, Pixl in the game Super Paper Mario
- Tippie, dog in Cap Stubbs and Tippie, an American syndicated comic strip
