= Members Church of God International =

Christian religious organization headquartered in the Philippines

- Mga Kaanib Iglesia ng Dios Internasyonal
- Seal
- Abbreviation: MCGI
- Classification: Restorationism
- Theology: Nontrinitarianism
- Governance: Central administration
- Overall Servant: Daniel Razon
- Region: 46 countries and territories
- Language: Filipino, English
- Headquarters: Apalit, Pampanga, Philippines
- Separated from: Iglesia ng Dios kay Cristo Jesús, Haligi at Suhay ng Katotohanan (Church of God in Christ Jesus, Pillar and Support of the Truth)
- Congregations: 1,935 as monitoring/coordinating centers
- Aid organization: ADD Foundation International; Kamanggagawa Foundation
- Primary schools: La Verdad Christian School
- Tertiary institutions: La Verdad Christian College
- Official website: www.mcgi.org
- Slogan: People Zealous of Good Works

The Members Church of God International (Tagalog: Mga Kaanib Iglesia ng Dios Internasyonal), abbreviated as MCGI, is an international Christian religious organization with headquarters in the Philippines. It is popularly known in the Philippines as Ang Dating Daan (English: The Old Path; abbreviated as ADD), after its flagship radio and television program of the same name which is also the longest-running religious program in the Philippines which was hosted by Eli Soriano, MCGI's overall servant (formerly called presiding minister) until his death in 2021.

In compliance with government regulations, Eli Soriano registered the group with the Securities and Exchange Commission (SEC) as Ang Mga Kaanib sa Iglesia ng Dios kay Cristo Jesús, Haligi at Saligan ng Katotohan sa Bansang Pilipinas (English: Members of the Church of God in Christ Jesus, Pillar and Ground of Truth in the Philippines). In 2004, its registered name was changed to "Members Church of God International" (Tagalog: Mga Kaanib Iglesia ng Dios Internasyonal) in line with the church's overseas expansion. The group is known in Hispanophone and Lusophone countries as Miembros de la Iglesia de Dios Internacional and Membros da Igreja de Deus Internacional respectively, shortened as MIDI.

MCGI is not related to the many Church of God groups that descended from the Barney Creek Meeting House revival of the late 19th century in the United States.

== History ==
The Members Church of God International in the Philippines rooted from a similar denomination, the Iglesia ng Dios kay Cristo Jesús, Haligi at Suhay ng Katotohanan (Church of God in Christ Jesus, Pillar and Support of the Truth) which was first headed by Nicolas Antiporda Perez in Pulilan, Bulacan, Philippines in 1928. It started as a small group with less than a hundred believers.

=== Perez' leadership (1928–1975) ===
On December 10, 1936, the church was registered with the Philippine government by Perez as Presiding Minister with a Central Office in Natividad St., Pasay (then part of Rizal). Since then, church workers were being sent to nearby provinces around Manila.

Perez led the church from 1928 until the time of his death in May 1975. In 1969, Perez gave Soriano an identification card bearing the "Minister" title. Before Perez died, he did not lay his hands on a successor. After the death of Perez, Soriano outlined the topics being taught to the members, in order for them not to lose hope. The members thought Perez prepared those topics before he died but other workers in the church knew, however, that it was written by Soriano.

On July 11, 1975, members of the Board of Trustees, including Soriano, allowed Levita Gugulan, the Secretary General, to act as "temporary" presiding officer until such time a new presiding officer is elected, in compliance to the Securities and Exchange Commission (SEC). However, Gugulan led the church permanently.

=== Schism and legal battle ===
Soriano and other members believe women are not allowed to rule over the church according to the Bible. In their belief that the group formerly led by Perez already went astray in the teachings of God, Soriano left the group led by Gugulan, together with some members who testified that they have heard Perez preach that it is strictly prohibited in the Bible for a woman to rule over the Church of God.

Soriano registered "Mga Kaanib sa Iglesia ng Dios kay Kristo Hesus Haligi at Saligan ng Katotohanan" (Members of the Church of God in Christ Jesus, the Pillar and Ground of Truth) with the Securities and Exchange Commission. Soriano used the word "saligan" (ground or foundation) in reference to the Greek word "ἑδραίωμα" (hedraióma), and not "suhay" (brace), which is used by Gugulan's group.

Gugulan's group filed a petition with the SEC to compel Soriano to change the registered name of his group. During the pendency of the case, Soriano registered "Ang Mga Kaanib sa Iglesia ng Dios Kay Kristo Hesus, Haligi at Saligan ng Katotohanan sa Bansang Pilipinas" to comply with the SEC. In 1996, the SEC En Banc favored Gugulan's petition and it was affirmed by the Court of Appeals in 1999. In December 2001, the Supreme Court First Division denied Soriano's appeal with finality. Pending Supreme Court's decision, Soriano reserved a new corporate name in 1996 containing transliterated Hebrew words and have it finalized in 2004 with the current name.

=== Soriano's leadership (1977–2021) ===
In the 1970s, missionary works started and were first in the towns of Pampanga and then, the neighboring provinces of Bulacan, Rizal, Nueva Ecija, Bataan, and Metro Manila. In the last quarter of 1980, the church launched the radio program Ang Dating Daan. Through the local radio station DWWA 1206 kHz, the radio program was heard in many parts of the Philippines. The program became popular because of its unique live question-and-answer portion. In 1983, the program kicked off its national television appearance through IBC Channel 13. Ang Dating Daan as a program in radio made its stint in television through RJTV 29, PTV 4, SBN 21, and now UNTV.

On January 13, 2004, the church registered "Members Church of God International" as its corporate name in the SEC. In the same year, the church tapped GlobeCast for The Old Path (TOP) Channel satellite broadcast in the United States of America and Canada.

On January 7, 2006, the first live Bible exposition in the United States was held in Los Angeles, California. In 2008, Bible Expositions were conducted in the continent of Oceania bringing forth the first congregation in Papua New Guinea. In the same year, congregations were established in Ghana, West Africa as a result of a series of Bible studies in Africa. The early months of 2009 saw the Church introduced in Latin America.

In June 2011, Soriano doles out vitamins, medicines for the congregation.

=== Razon's leadership (2021–present) ===
From April 4–10, 2021, the church held a special event entitled The Legacy Continues. A week-long commemoration with worldwide events for public service and charity programs. A total of 628,567 individuals benefited from the global feeding program across 7,377 locations worldwide. During the event, a total of 2,021 branches of MCGI free stores are already opened from its initial launch. Another total of 1,200 individuals benefited for the mass wish-granting activity for small-scale livelihood grants and free tablets that they can use for online schooling needs.

== Organization ==
The Members Church of God International as an organization is managed by its Central Administration under the Workers Ministry (now Servants' ministry). It is composed of the Overall Servants (Tagalog: Mga Lingkod Pangkalahatan), council of Helpers of the Ministry (Tagalog: Mga Katulong ng Pangangasiwa abbreviated as "KNP") and Church Servants (Tagalog: Mga engkargado).

=== Overall servants ===
List of Overall Servants
Name	Date
Eli Soriano	1977 – 2021
Daniel Razon	2021 – present

Bro. Eli Soriano was the Overall Servant (Tagalog: Lingkod Pangkalahatan) to the church (formerly called as presiding minister or Tagapangasiwang Pangkalahatan in Tagalog) until February 2021. His deputy, Bro. Daniel Razon is the Assistant Overall Servant (Tagalog: Pangalawang Lingkod Pangkalahatan, formerly called as vice presiding minister or Pangalawang Tagapangasiwang Pangkalahatan in Tagalog).

They supervise the entire organization, implement policies and projects, teach the helpers of the ministry (formerly called as assistants to the administration, ministers-in-charge, abbreviated as "MIC" and officers-in-charge, abbreviated as "OIC") and church workers all the doctrines of Christ and oversee rightful execution of duties and responsibilities assigned to them, including other officials in various church ministries and organizations.

The overall servant prepares the outline of biblical topics (Tagalog: paksa) and preach sermons. A part of it will be delivered and discussed by his deputy. Preaching of biblical topic is done by the Overall Servants, either live or recorded, which is being aired in all locale church congregations. They also personally take time to resolve spiritual and personal problems of members every Thanksgiving gathering, during the consultation period.

=== Helpers and workers ===
Helpers of the ministry supervise a church "Division" (Tagalog: Dibisyon) referring to a geographical region in the Philippines or group of countries in a continent such as Asia Oceania. Area Servants (Tagalog: Lingkod Pampook, formerly called as Tagapangasiwang Pampook and abbreviated as "TP") oversee a church "District" (Tagalog: Distrito) referring to one Philippine province. Assigned Church Servants administer various church services such as Prayer Meetings, Worship Services, Indoctrination Sessions, Bible Studies, Bible Expositions, and Thanksgiving in local congregations. They are allowed to communicate official memorandum signed by the Overall Servants and preside over matters and activities concerning the local church. Brethren can personally seek spiritual or personal advice from servants (encargado), who were trained during ministerial classes, in giving Biblical advice and recommendations.

== Logo ==
As required by Philippines agency Securities and Exchange Commission (SEC) for organizations to have their respective official seal, where every paper submitted to the office must have a dry seal, Bro. Eli Soriano was obliged to create a dry seal for the church. Thus the following symbols explain:

- The open book represents the Bible;
- The torch represents the lamp;
- The cords represent a binding tie, which is the love that exists among the members;
- The anchor represents the hope that the members have in the Church of God;
- The big star, which dominates everything in the logo, represents Christ;
- The four Hebrew characters on the open book, referred to as Tetragrammaton, read (right to left) as Yod, He, Vau, He, and translated in English as YHWH, is the original name of God in Hebrew, written in the Ten Commandments.

== Membership ==
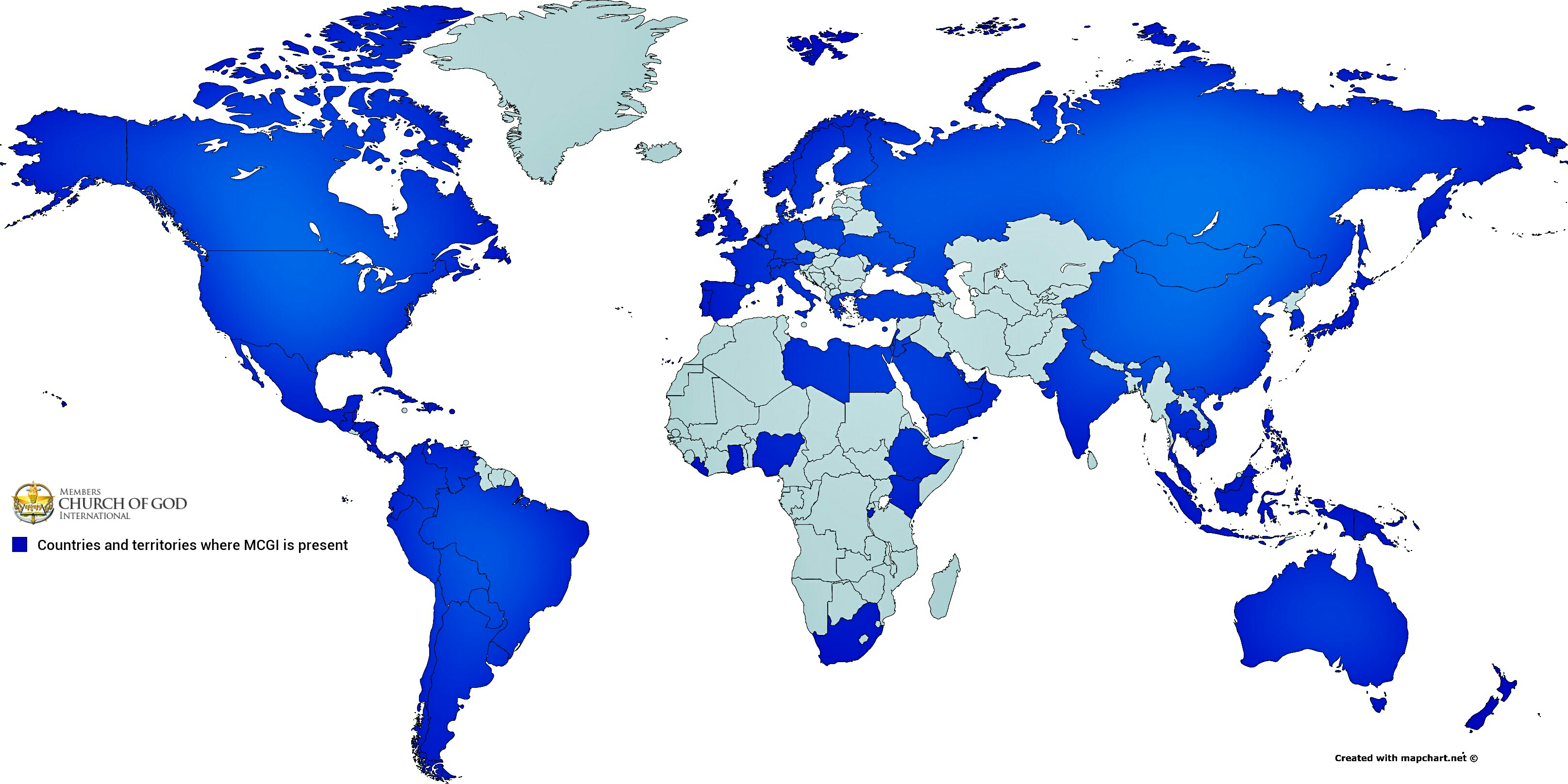
In blue are countries and territories where Members Church of God International (MCGI) is present as of 2015.

The church keeps a formal number of members but does not openly reveal it. In 2015, the church gained more than 20,000 new members through regular and mass baptisms.

As of 2015, the church has established more than 1,360 congregations in the Philippines and abroad, up from a total of 1,280 locales reported in 2014.

Congregations are grouped geographically by divisions, districts and zones mainly the Philippines, South America, North America, Canada, Asia Oceania, Middle East, Europe, Israel and Africa Division. The official website of the church reported its presence in 46 countries and territories as of 2010.

Since its arrival in South America in 2009, the church saw a growing number of locales in the continent. As of 2015, it reported 237 established locales in Brazil, including those in Curitiba, Porto Alegre, Rio de Janeiro, São Paulo, and Florianópolis.

Members not living in accordance with the church's teachings may be excommunicated or expelled, from the church.

== Propagation and evangelization efforts ==
The Members Church of God International believe that an important duty and obligation of the members of the church is to propagate the gospel on earth until the consummation of the ages. Eli Soriano began his nightly town-to-town preaching in the 1970s but eventually realized that his life is not enough to reach the entire Philippines. In the 1980s he decided to use emerging media such as radio and television.

In October 1980, it initially launched the Ang Dating Daan program hosted by Bro. Eli Soriano and Bro. Daniel Razon and later on Philippine television in February 1983. The program is now being broadcast in more than 70 countries, in five languages over terrestrial television, radio, internet and carried by at least seven satellites across the globe.

Currently, the church programs reach in six inhabited continents via TV Verdade, TV La Verdad, The Truth Channel and UNTV using the services of at least seven satellite providers.

=== Radio broadcast ===
The 30-minute AM radio program of Ang Dating Daan began in 1980. In 1999, the program is heard nationwide through DZRH, RMN and 100 Radyo Natin stations. Since 2011, the radio program is now on its home station UNTV Radyo La Verdad 1350.

=== Television broadcast ===
The program started its television debut in February 1983 on IBC-13. Later, it was transferred to RJTV-29, PTV-4 and SBN-21. In 2004, UNTV-37 became its permanent home. UNTV 37 is a free-to-air network and also carried by major cable networks and direct-to-home providers.

Between 2010 and 2011, the church reached the airwaves of India, Uruguay, Argentina, Bolivia and Portugal by acquiring timeslots in local television channels. To further boost viewership, it acquired a 30-minute slot on Fox Channel which is carried by 50 cable networks in Central America and South America. Later, the church acquired timeslots in Chile, Paraguay, Peru, Ecuador, Colombia, Venezuela, Honduras, Costa Rica, Nicaragua and Guatemala. In 2013, the program was aired in Mexico via Gala TV. It was followed by broadcasts in Dominican Republic, Spain, Equatorial Guinea and soon in Cuba.

The church also founded ADDTV in 2014 and launched it as Truth Channel on September 3, 2017. The channel features Itanong mo kay Soriano. In the same year, the church began its 24/7 free-to-air terrestrial broadcast El Camino Antiguo in El Salvador on Canal 61.

On February 13, 2016, MCGI receives Anak TV seals for its five television programs Truth in Focus, A Song of Praise, KNC Show, Munting Parangarap and Kaagapay approved by Anak TV Foundation.

On March 4, 2022, the church debuts a new program MCGI Cares on UNTV-37 and on social media hosted by Bro. Daniel Razon.

=== Satellite broadcast ===
MCGI began its satellite broadcast in North America in 2004.

In 2004, the church tapped GlobeCast to air the TOP Channel in United States and Canada via a direct-to-home satellite broadcast through Galaxy 19, Eutelsat Hotbird 13D and Measat which aims to propagate the program to English-speaking countries including Europe and Asia. In 2010, it was aired in the Philippines via Dream Satellite TV. In 2016, TOP Channel was relaunched as The Truth Channel.

On December 26, 2009, the church launched TV Verdade (transl. Truth TV) via Star One C2, SES-6 and Thaicom 5. It primarily airs O Caminho Antigo, the Portuguese version of Ang Dating Daan through local free television channels in Brazil. Currently, the program airs in Minas Gerais, the second most populous state in Brazil, Paraná, Cornélio Procópio. In December 2016, TV Verdade HD was launched in high definition (HD) format (1080p) for households in South and Central America and some parts of North America via SES-6.

In July 2012, the church also launched TV La Verdad (transl. Truth TV), its broadcast channel for Spanish-speaking countries airing via SES-6.

=== Online media ===
In 1999, the church joined the World Wide Web when it launched a website called angdatingdaan.org with video streaming feature. Its English version went online in 2005 as theoldpath.tv.

From 2001 to 2007, the website Kaanib.NET was an online community and portal that connected the global members.

From 2004 to 2005, the website mybeliever.com was an online news magazine featuring church events with its printed version known as Believer NewsMagazine. The printed features memoirs of 2004 mid-year International Thanksgiving, Daniel S. Razon: the man of steel, MIC: ministers in Christ, a photoquote special edition and the last edition was Happy New Year which recognized Nisan as the start of year in Hebrew calendar.

In 2007, Eliseo Soriano published his official blogsite and another blog in 2014. ControversyX is an expository blog, in five languages, which tackles issues about religion. It has more than 4.5 million page views As of May 2016.

In 2009, the international website of the church went online as mcgi.org.

In 2012, the church's official Facebook page was created.

In 2014, the church introduced the "MCGI Broadcast App."

In October 2020, the MCGI Classified Ads was launched to cater job opportunities available for members.

A short-lived podcast program The Unheard Truth was launched on Google and Spotify until 2021.

Continuing the church propagation in spreading the word of God, MCGI released Digital Bible app on July 1, 2022. The app can be downloaded on both Android and iOS devices for free access of the public.

=== Print media ===
The church distributes print and digital materials for free. It publishes the "TOP Magazine", "Believer Newsmagazine" and a newspaper called "Magandang Balita" (English: Good News). Soriano's online blogs are also compiled and printed as "The Blog Magazine".

The church has also been acknowledged by the Philippine Bible Society as a regular donor and major distribution partner of Tagalog Bibles. Copies of full-length Ang Dating Daan episodes are also distributed in DVD format.

== Beliefs and fundamental doctrines ==
The Members Church of God International believes that the Almighty God, the Father sent his begotten Son, Jesus Christ, instrumental in the establishment of the "Church of God", first planted in Jerusalem and preached by the apostles. They believe that gentile nations, including the Philippines, are partakers of the promise of eternal life through belief in Jesus Christ and the gospel and are not authorized by God to establish their own church, but were members associated with the same "body" or the church written in the gospel by accepting it and executing the doctrines written by the apostles. The church's registered name contains descriptive words "ang mga kaanib" in Tagalog or "members" in English to emphasize the group's association today, as members of the "Church of God" that was already established a long time ago.

For them, the church's primary objective, as commanded by Jesus Christ, is to propagate the gospel to all nations until the consummation of the ages, convert sinners to believe and glorify God and to make them qualify for the eternal life in heaven. They believe in God the Father, Jesus Christ the Son, and the Holy Spirit but they adopt a nontrinitarianism orientation, rejecting the Trinitarian concept that there is "one God in three co-equal persons", which for them is against the Bible. They believe that the Father is greater than all, greater than Jesus Christ as declared by Christ himself. They do not observe customs and traditions which they consider to have pagan origins incompatible with Christianity. Church members prefer to be called and identified as plain "Christians".

=== God the Father ===
The Almighty God is also called as "God of Israel" citing Exod 5:1, the creator of the universe (Acts 14:15), with his Son, Jesus Christ (John 1:1–14). God cannot lie. God is not omniscient (he does not know ahead of time all future human actions and choices), and God is not omnipresent (he created hell but is not there).

=== The Lord Jesus Christ ===
Jesus Christ is the Father's only Begotten Son (in Romanized Greek: Monogenēs theos) as mentioned in John 1:18. For them, Christ is the Wonderful, Counselor, a true and Mighty God, Prince of Peace referred in Isa 9:6. He is the only savior of mankind and the only way to the kingdom of God in heaven (Acts 14:15, 1 Cor 8:5–7, John 14:6; 14:1). He is recognized as the Apostle, High Priest (Heb 3:1) and Mediator (1 Tim 2:5) of the church. They believe that Christ descended on earth from the bosom of the Father, suffered for the redemption of sin, died on the cross, resurrected after three days, ascended to heaven and sat on the right side of God.

=== The Holy Spirit ===
The Holy Spirit is the "comforter" citing John 14:26, sent by the Father and Christ, to give spiritual happiness and to help the brethren in his or her weaknesses, and to console a believer in times of persecution and trials (Rom 8:26).

=== Prayer ===
Prayer is a basic doctrine in the church. All church gatherings, either spiritual or socio-civic, begin and end with prayers. The church believes that it is a commandment of God to live a prayerful life based on 1 Thes 5:17. To encourage its members to pray, the church launched an exclusive 24/7 prayer service website on March 6, 2011, enabling access to continuous singing of praises and hourly community prayer to God. They believe that it is prohibited to pray in public just to be seen (Matt 6:5). As a discipline, they refrain from showing the act of praying on their television broadcasts, either live or recorded, in public. In November 2013, the church launched a community prayer service on UNTV and Radyo La Verdad 1350 AM. However, only the audio of the community prayer is being aired, to encourage non-brethren to join and participate in praying to God, without necessarily being seen publicly.

=== Bible ===
The church believes that only the Bible or the Holy Scriptures, composed of 66 inspired books of the Protestant canon, teaches the full wisdom of God for the salvation of man and that no other books should be used as basis for serving God and Jesus Christ.

=== The Church of God in the Bible ===
They believe that God is "calling" those people with determination to serve him, bringing them in his fold (1 Pet 1:15–16, 1 Cor 1:9; 1:2), teaching them righteousness after baptism, for their sins to be covered by the priceless blood of Christ poured in Mount Calvary, for the redemption of sin, to make them qualify for life eternal in heaven (Phil 1:27, Eph 2:10; 4:1; 4:10; 4:14).

=== The church mission ===
The church believes that Jesus Christ delegated the task of preaching the Word of God, on a global scale, to his apostles based on Matt 28:19–20 and fulfilling this commandment is their primary objective. The church aims to propagate the gospel on earth until the consummation of the ages. They believe that only the church can teach the wisdom of God for the salvation of mankind citing Luke 8:1–3, Eph 3:10 and 2 Tim 3:14–17. They believe that this effort is geared towards converting sinners to believe and glorify God (Acts 2:38).

=== Baptism ===
Baptism is a key part in their doctrines. Membership is conferred through immersion baptism of adults. Indoctrination classes are required prior to joining the organization. The classes are composed of nine lessons concerning church doctrines prepared by the Overall Servant, Eliseo Soriano. Indoctrinees must fully accept the doctrines taught during the indoctrination before they can be baptized. The church rejects infant baptism.

==== Mass baptism ====
The church conducts a mass baptism at the 15th session of mass indoctrination series. This event is held at the MCGI Chapel in Apalit, Pampanga, and various MCGI coordinating centers worldwide. It is where listeners who completed the mass indoctrination sessions voluntarily accept the doctrine of the Lord Jesus Christ.

== Church services and events ==
The congregation meets regularly on a daily basis. Gatherings are held in Ang Dating Daan convention centers and monitoring centers, which are typically functional in character, and do not contain religious symbols except for the church logo and reminders for non-members that are prominently displayed.

All gatherings of the church are opened with congregational singing of an opening song, followed by hymns led by the choir and then an opening prayer. After prayer, it follows a reading of chapter or two of the Bible. The subject matter (topic) for most meetings is the same worldwide. After the topic has been delivered, brethren kneel down for closing prayers followed by a doxology and basbas (blessing). When guests or visitors are invited or wish to attend these church gatherings, they are free to stay in their seats.

The members believe that Christians should always attend religious gatherings regularly.

In 2011, a Bible-reading segment was added where a chapter or two of the Bible is being read. Meetings are devoted to the study of a Biblical topic, divided in portions, and will be continued in succeeding meetings.

In March 2020, the presentation of topic reactions was added, where members share what they have learned from the topic of previous gatherings, as part of the doctrine of edifying one another in the Christian love.

=== Serbisyong kapatiran ===
In July 2020, Serbisyong kapatiran is launched as online daily gathering of members from Mondays to Fridays at 9:30 p.m. in the Philippines. It is initially broadcast live on an Instagram private account exclusive for brethren access. The program eventually grows and showcases Story of My Faith, Kristiano Drama, video greetings and picture-taking, singing of church hymns and songs and more. The program is now available through the MCGI.TV website and its mobile app version with the option to watch previous episodes. On September 4, 2023, Serbisyong Kapatiran: Ang Pagsasanay was launched.

Serbisyong Kapatiran afternoon edition also airs from Wednesdays and Fridays at 1:00 p.m. (Philippine standard time).

Similar to the Serbisyong kapatiran is the Serbisyong kasangbahay which was launched on July 18, 2016 when UNTV was rebranded into a global news and rescue company. The latter became to what is now known as Serbisyong bayanihan in April 2020, a new public service program which aims to address the public’s issues and concerns.

=== Prayer meeting ===
Prayer meeting is recorded live every Wednesday at 4:30 a.m.(Philippine standard time) as its first batch. To accommodate other members including visitors who cannot attend the live prayer meeting, the gathering is arranged by batches until Friday 12:00 a.m.(Philippine standard time) as its last batch.

=== Worship service ===
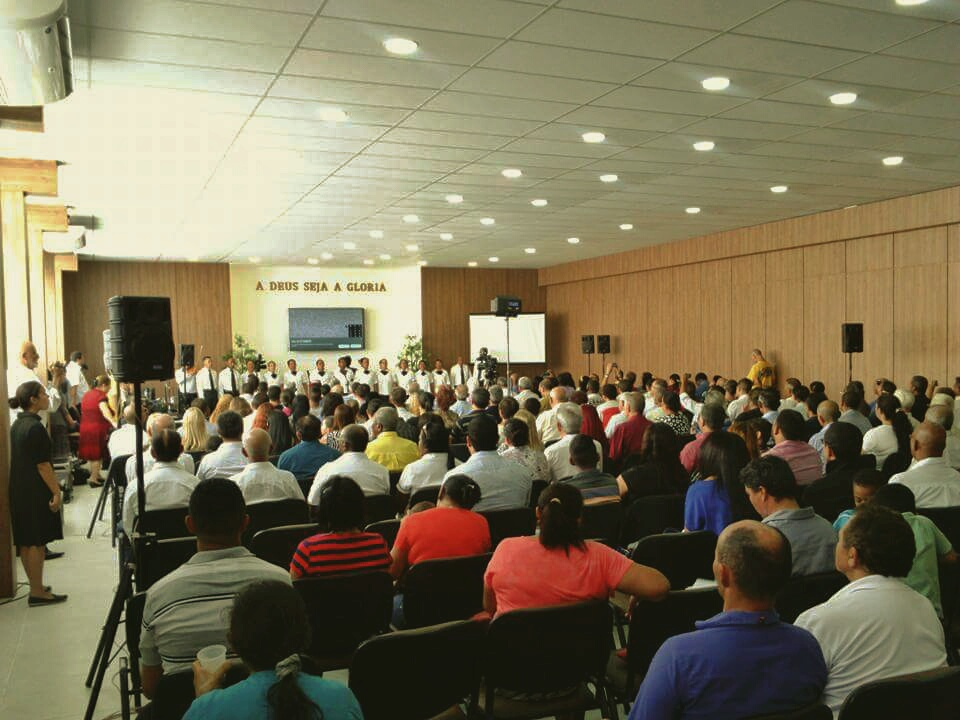
Worship service at MCGI locale in São Paulo, Brazil

Worship service is also recorded live every Saturday at 4:30 a.m. (Philippine standard time) as its earliest batch. Like prayer meeting, batches are also arranged afterwards to accommodate members until Sunday at 2:30 p.m. (Philippine standard time) as its last batch. Worship service includes voluntary contributions which is open for members only. Suspended members including guests and visitors are strictly prohibited to participate in monetary contributions.

Once in every quarter, the church combines Prayer Meeting and Worship Service in preparation for a three-day International Thanksgiving of the members.

=== Thanksgiving of God's People ===
==== Weekly Thanksgiving ====
Thanksgiving viewing service in a locale in Makati, Philippines

The church offers a weekly "Thanksgiving of God's People", formerly known as "Thanksgiving to God" (Tagalog: "Pasalamat sa Dios"), which is recorded live every Saturdays at 5:00 p.m. (Philippine standard time). Brethren who have prepared themselves to offer the sacrifice of thanksgiving will be singing songs of praises live on stage at the ADD Convention Center or at the nearest church local (a coordinating center). Like the worship service, a monetary contribution is conducted voluntarily for members only in the form of hain and gugol. A Biblical topic is delivered in full by the overall servants.

To accommodate members who cannot attend the live meeting, they can also attend replay for viewing purposes the recently concluded Thanksgiving on Sundays (two batches, 6:00 a.m and 5:30 p.m. in Philippine standard time), Mondays, Tuesdays and Fridays (all at 8:30 a.m. in Philippine standard time).

==== Quarterly Thanksgiving ====
Every quarter of each year, the congregation gather for a three-day Special Thanksgiving of God's People (transl. Special Pasalamat ng Buong Bayan ng Dios (SPBB)) in Tagalog, formerly called as "International Thanksgiving to God (ITG)" and "Pasalamat ng Katawan (PNK)" (transl. Thanksgiving of the Body). It has a similar format like the weekly thanksgiving except it allows more time for the Biblical topic and the spiritual consultation.

The Quarterly Thanksgiving is broadcast live exclusively which starts on a Friday, Saturday and Sunday at 5:00 p.m. (Philippine standard time) with replays on Monday, Tuesday and Friday at 8:30 a.m. (Philippine standard time).

From April 3–5, 2015, South America hosted the first quarter of the international thanksgiving in Florianopolis, Brazil. Tens of thousands of members gathered together with other venues around the world.

=== Christian New Year ===
Instead of celebrating the new year every first day of January of the Gregorian calendar, MCGI celebrates Christian New Year with a special thanksgiving every first day of Nisan, using the Hebrew calendar, which falls between March and April. For the current year, the Christian New Year will be celebrated on March 30, 2025.

=== Lord's supper ===
The church commemorates annually the sacrifice of the Lord Jesus Christ every 13th of Nisan of the Hebrew calendar. The event usually falls between March and April in the Gregorian calendar. It recounts the greatest love and sacrifice of the Lord for humanity. For the current year, the event will be commemorated on April 11, 2025.

=== Feast dedicated to God ===
The Fiesta ng Dios (Feast Dedicated to God) or simply Ang Dating Daan People's Day is recently launched by the church on February 24, 2019. Church members and visitors, especially the poor and the disabled, who are the feast's special guests, are treated to free sumptuous meals, entertainment, and fun activities. The celebration aims to spread God's love through the joyous occasion. This event is based in the Bible, referring to Luke 14:13-14 “But when thou makest a feast, call the poor, the maimed, the lame, the blind: And thou shalt be blessed; for they cannot recompense thee: for thou shalt be recompensed at the resurrection of the just.” making MCGI the first to hold this feast dedicated to God.

On November 24, 2019, MCGI held its second feast event to culminate the celebration of Ang Dating Daan's 39th anniversary on airwaves. The feast is also called brethren day.

== Practices ==
=== Mass indoctrination ===
A series of sessions where the doctrines of Jesus Christ are preached to those who are interested to become members of the church, including guests invited by current members. The mass indoctrination consists of 14 sessions being broadcast through social media platforms. Baptism will follow when a person accepts the teachings which is officiated on the 15th session.

==== Languages ====
The indoctrination sessions are primarily delivered in Tagalog, with additional voice-over interpretations available in other major Philippine languages. These sessions have also been translated into various international languages (except Arabic, and Russian), including English, Spanish, Chinese, and French. Furthermore, voice-over interpretations are provided for languages such as Portuguese, Japanese, Korean, German, and Italian, among others.

==== Topics by session ====
Each session begins with an instrumental song presentation by the orchestra, opening song number, singing of psalms and hymns led by chorale members and opening prayer led by a servant. After prayer, an opening song presentation followed by an introductory message and greetings by Bro. Daniel Razon then a particular topic which is delivered by Bro. Eli Soriano. Topics by each session are as follows:

- Session 1 – The Church Built by God
- Session 2 – Accepting Christ and His words
- Session 3 – Reverence to God
- Session 4 – The Right Way to Pray
- Session 5 – Are Your Prayers Heard?
- Session 6 – The Why of Praying
- Session 7 – How Should We Treat People
- Session 8 – Love for Humanity
- Session 9 – Gatherings of Christians
- Session 10 – The Inner Man
- Session 11 – Good Works and Giving
- Session 12 – Reading Your Heart
- Session 13 – Sins Against the Holy Spirit
- Session 14 – True baptism

After the designated topic, the session ends with a closing prayer, singing of doxology and pronouncement of bless or basbas. Usually the duration of these sessions last for about two hours each.

=== Global prayer for humanity ===
Even before the pandemic, the church was already holding its community prayer. In response to the ongoing COVID-19 pandemic, the church launched the Global Prayer for Humanity. It was an initiative by Bro. Eli Soriano where anyone around the world can join to pray to God at the same time. It was started on May 25, 2020, at 9:30 p.m. (Philippine standard time).

=== Bible exposition ===
A unique program that gives answers to questions about life, religion and faith. It is presented in many languages broadcast via satellite and in social media platforms.

=== Bible study ===
A biblical talk that aims to help people learn the Bible with an assigned topic. It also aims to correct false belief and concepts about the holy scriptures.

== Architecture ==
Currently, the Members Church of God International is present in six inhabited continents of the world with more than 1,360 established local congregations. Convention and coordinating centers serve as places of worship where members congregate themselves.

=== Convention centers ===
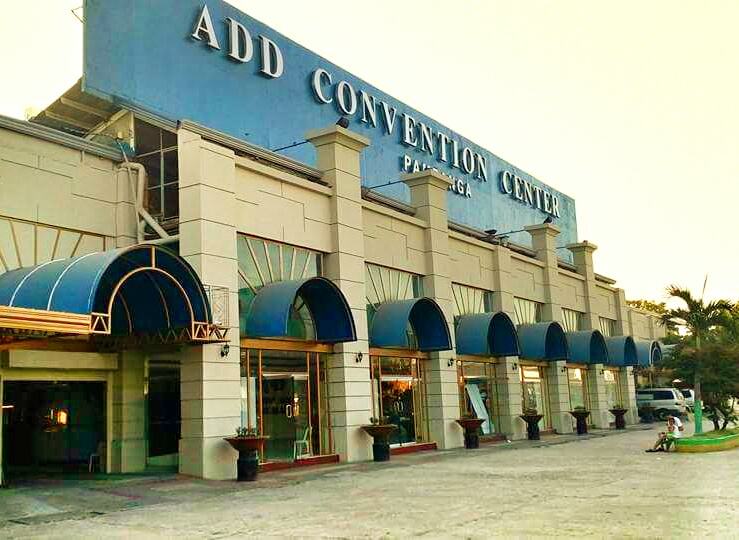
The ADD Convention Center, the MCGI headquarters in the Philippines

The 10-hectare Ang Dating Daan (ADD) compound in Apalit, Pampanga is the church's headquarters in the Philippines. It houses the ADD Convention Center where major church gatherings are held and the chapel, a multipurpose venue for the community prayer, indoctrination sessions, prayer meetings and worship services. Other structures inside the compound include the baptistry, administration office, museum, transient home, orphanages, mini-hospital, dormitories for church officers and volunteers, houses for church ministers and workers and school buildings of La Verdad Christian College.

There are also other convention centers located in Batangas, Laguna and Brazil.

=== Coordinating centers ===
The church has established more than a 1,360 local congregations. These venues are also called the Ang Dating Daan Coordinating Centers, MCGI Satellite Monitoring Centers or MCGI chapters. It is where the brethren meet to attend church gatherings and host indoctrination sessions. Most of the sites are rented or church-acquired property spaces in urban and rural communities in the Philippines and abroad. These centers are equipped with C-band satellite dish antenna and high-speed broadband connection, these sites are able to receive real-time broadcast feeds emanating from the headquarters. Assigned church workers and officers oversee activities at locale chapters and receive queries regarding membership in the church. In 2012, a mobile coordinating center was launched including livelihood academy. A bus transformed into a cozy venue with roof, chairs, television screen and satellite receiver, can accommodate guests in remote areas during Bible Expositions.

=== Walk of faith fountain ===
The church's Walk of Faith water fountain features a series of stone tablets inscribed with the names of heroes of faith and their most well-known acts recorded in the Bible. It was inaugurated on April 30, 2018, after a thanksgiving event.

=== MCGI Chapel ===
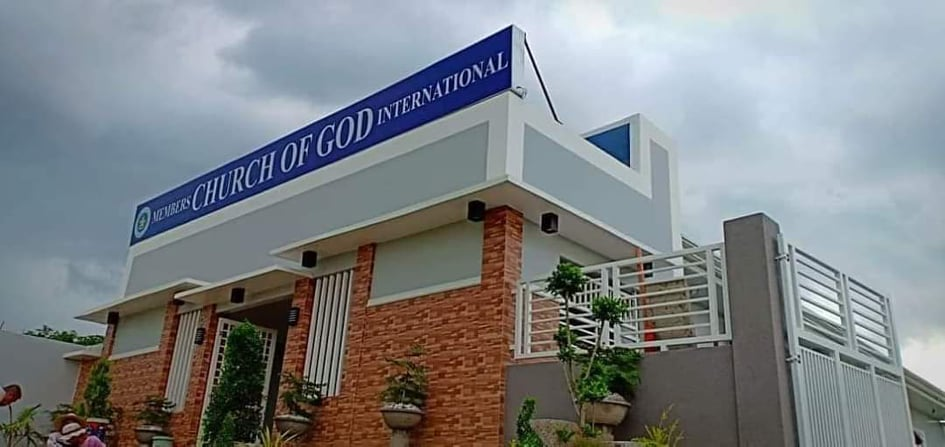
MCGI Chapel in Concepcion, Tarlac

On May 7, 2019, the church inaugurates two additional facilities inside the MCGI Compound in Apalit, Pampanga: the new Administration Building and the MCGI Chapel and Multi-Purpose Hall.

=== MCGI Cares Hospital ===
In 2023, the Church leaders led the groundbreaking of the Members Church of God International Cares Hospital along MacArthur Highway in Barangay Samapaloc, Apalit. The 7-Storey 100-bed project is beside La Verdad Christian College and ADD Convention Center Its construction is jointly handled by ATY Construction Corporation with MATCON Development - Matcon Construction Services Inc., Quadruple J Construction Services, JavaTech Java Tech Industrial Supply, Engineering Services and Trading and Copper & Power Trend Construction Inc.

=== MCGI Philippine Loop ===
The MCGI Philippine Loop is an initiative by the Members Church of God International, involving 27 teams traveling to various locations for connect, serve, and establishing a modern house of worship (locale) construction to the brethren those who cannot build a suitable places of worship or locale(chapel) in their areas. This activity was conceptualized by Brother Daniel Razon, since November, 2023.

== Functions and ministries ==
On June 28, 2020, MCGI launched a 24-hour livestream of spiritual and praise songs through YouTube. It aims for members to have easier access to the originally composed songs and hymns that they can listen via the Internet.

In September 2021, the song Cristiano Ako, Cristiano Tayo was posted on Facebook by Sister Arlene Razon. The song is a composition of Bro. Daniel Razon and sung by various singers. It became the theme song of the program MCGI Cares.

=== Music ministry ===
MCGI's music ministry leads members in the singing of hymns during church gatherings. Aspiring members of this ministry are given recognition of their talents in music during commencement events called Pagsulong.

=== Theater ministry ===
MCGI's theater ministry or teatro kristiano consists of youth members of the church who are focused on the performing arts through dance choreographies. They complement hymns and songs of praise in the church gathering or events.

=== MCGI symphony orchestra ===
MCGI has an orchestra of more than 200 musicians. They regularly play during church events including concerts. Musicians play the following instrument families: strings, winds, brass and percussion. The orchestra also includes rhythm instruments.

=== MCGI music school ===
It aims to educate people for potential musical talents via virtual class being done by professional music-makers. Programs include voice lessons, and also includes instruments like piano, guitar, violin, drum, flute, cello, clarinet, trumpet and trombone. It offers beginner and intermediate specializations which will last for three months of training.

=== Servant's ministry ===
Church members of at least one year tenurity are invited to become part of servant's ministry. These are church workers or manggagawa(encargado) who oversee locale chapters of the church.

== Records ==
=== Largest gospel choir ===
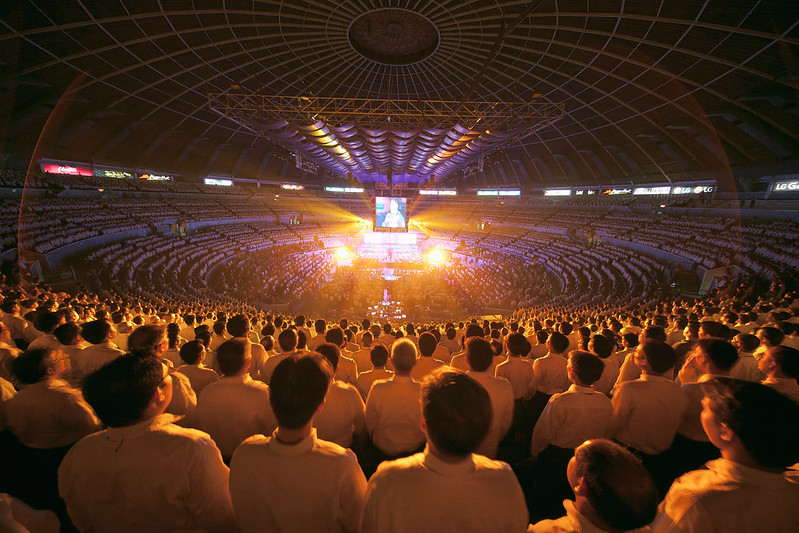
MCGI Largest Gospel Choir recital at Smart Araneta Coliseum in 2015

On October 12, 2015, Members Church of God International set the Guinness World Record as the "Largest Gospel Choir" in the world, as part of the 35th anniversary celebration of the Ang Dating Daan (The Old Path) religious program in radio and television broadcasting. The official video of the performance was published in The Old Path YouTube channel with 2.4 million views as of May 2023.

Guinness adjudicator Fortuna Burke Melhem witnessed the recital of 8,688 singers at the Smart Araneta Coliseum in Cubao, Quezon City. The Ang Dating Daan Chorale performed a 15-minute medley of original MCGI Christian praise music compositions, entitled "Stand Up," "Praise the Name," "Hallelujah, Amen," and "Enrich the Spirit."

MCGI donated more than three million pesos for people with disabilities (PWD) who were invited as main guests during the event. Beneficiaries were government-accredited charitable institutions and federations for PWDs and more than 1,700 PWD guests and their families.

It surpassed the previous 4,745-singer record achieved by the Iglesia ni Cristo (INC) in 2014. However, on May 22, 2016, the INC regained the record with 21,262 singers at the Philippine Arena.

== Charities and public services ==
On August 8, 2010, Philippine media station UNTV recognizes MCGI as its outstanding public service partner during the former's six anniversary celebration. The church is UNTV's partner since 2004 in bringing social service projects to the public.

In Canada, MCGI is recognized for its charitable projects including the blood donation campaign. The church is considered by Canadian Blood Services as one of its national partners that seek to provide free social services more effectively and efficiently for people needing help in Canada.

=== Medical missions ===
In 2012, a group of citizens thanks MCGI for medical mission in Macabebe, Pampanga through ADD Foundation, the church's charity institution. On July 12, 2012, the church establishes an infant care center with accreditation from the Philippine's department of social welfare and development (DSWD).

In 2013, the church held medical missions nationwide. The simultaneous medical mission serves 20,000 indigents who receive free healthcare assistance with partner Rotary Club of the Philippines.

=== Free store ===
On March 14, 2021, the church opened its MCGI free store worldwide. The store was originally exclusive for members prior to its global launch. Beneficiaries can choose items or products using coupons with designated number of points.

=== Dental and optical clinic ===
On February 6, 2023, the MCGI dental and optical clinic was launched. As of October 2023, two additional units have been added, serving patients from 44 provinces with dental, optical, and medical services, free of charge.

== Debates ==
On March 27, 2005, in a video statement, Eli Soriano (then presiding minister of MCGI) challenges Eraño Manalo (then executive minister of INC) in a one-on-one debate to be broadcast live on Philippine television worldwide. The challenge was also published in The Sunday Times. Manalo's answer to the challenge was for Soriano to debate the pope of the Catholic church (referring to Pope John Paul II at that time) first and to speak in Latin language before he (Manalo) accepts the challenge. Manalo rejected the challenge until his death.

== Relation with the Iglesia ni Cristo ==
On April 18, 2005, five members were injured during the clash with some INC members inside a fastfood chain located in Apalit, Pampanga.

In 2005, Daniel Razon, then vice-presiding minister was accused of cursing a minister of Iglesia ni Cristo which he denied. The management of GMA Network advised Razon not to get involved with Ang Dating Daan; the latter decided to leave the network due to malicious accusation. He said in a statement, "I would rather lose my job and career than lose my faith and my God!"

== Gallery ==
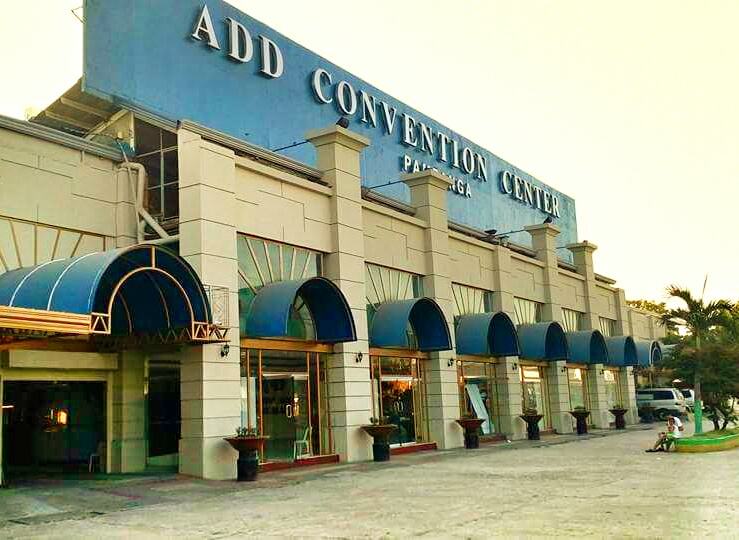
ADD Convention Center

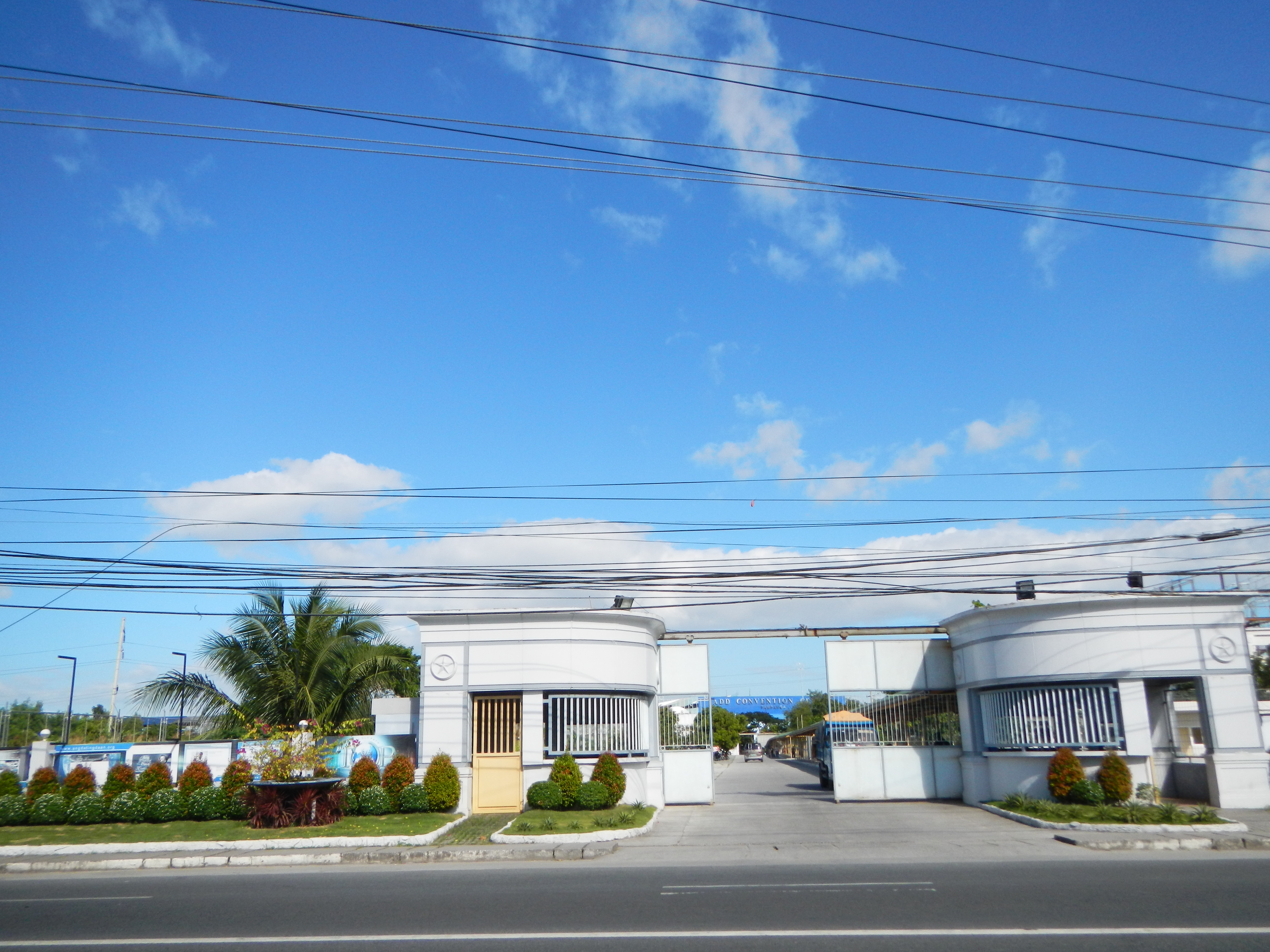
Facade of ADD Convention Center

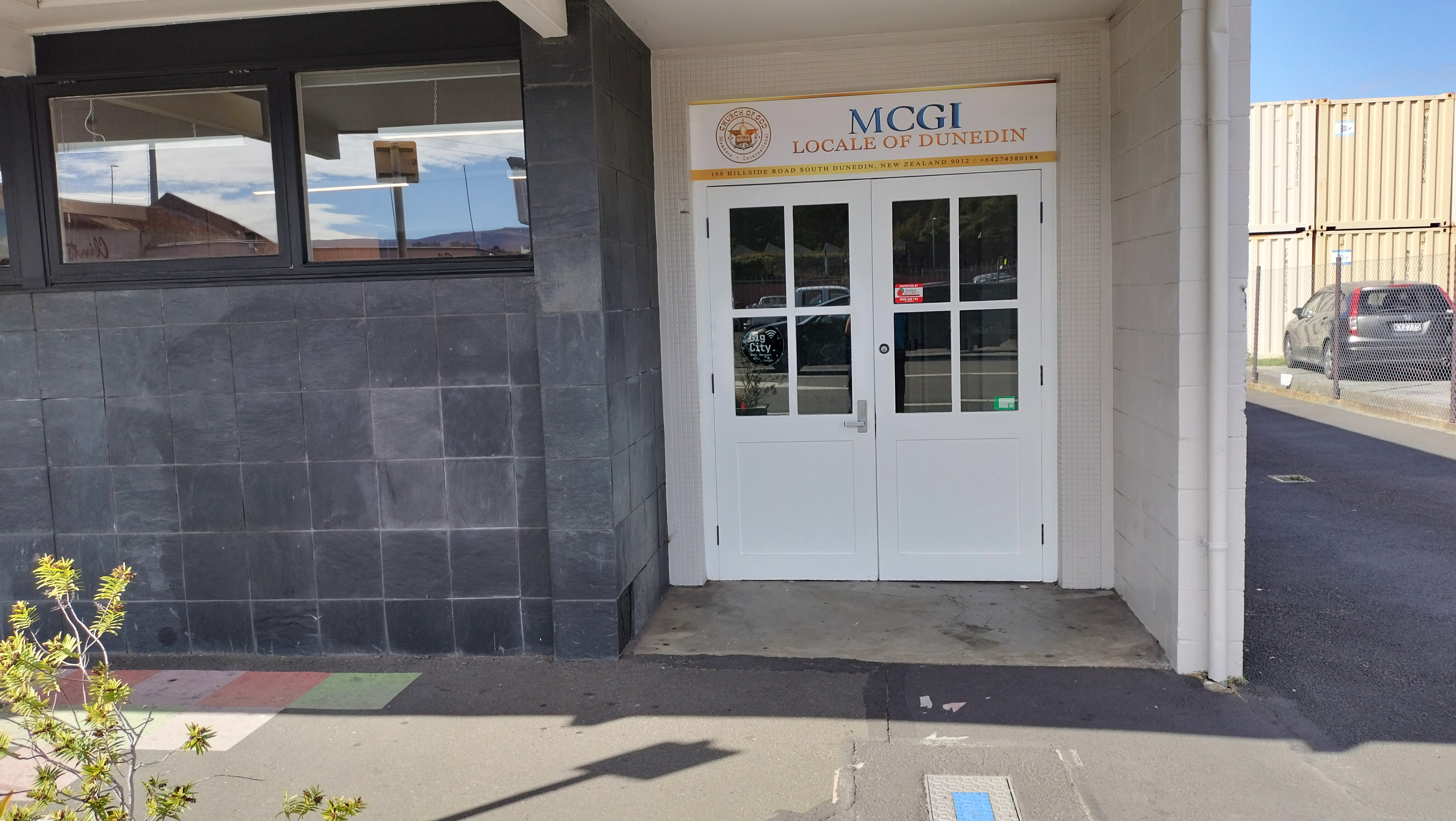
A MCGI church in Dunedin, New Zealand.

== See also ==
- Eli Soriano
- Daniel Razon
