= Broadcast ministry of Members Church of God International =

Ministry of Philippine church

Broadcast ministry of the Members Church of God International
- Type: Religious
- Headquarters: Philippines, Brazil
- Region served: International
- Website: www.mcgi.org

Broadcast media is being utilized by the Members Church of God International (MCGI), an international Christian religious organization with headquarters in the Philippines, to preach the gospel and expand internationally. The church is producing religious programs in different languages, aired in various countries, by acquiring time slots on several television stations. The church also maintains its own radio and television network for its 24/7 terrestrial, satellite and internet broadcasts.

The MCGI started as a small group with less than a hundred believers in 1977. It is popularly known in the Philippines as Ang Dating Daan (ADD) (English: The Old Path), the title of its flagship radio and television program and currently the longest-running religious program in the Philippines with Eliseo Soriano (also known as "Bro. Eli") as the program's main host and the "Overall Servant" (Former title: "Presiding Minister") to MCGI. Most of its broadcast ministries are directly funded by the church, through voluntary contributions from its members, as the church do not accept monetary donations from non-members. Meanwhile, a few of its news and public affairs programs in the Philippines are supported by commercial advertisements.

Its global evangelism is conducted mostly via AM radio, FM radio, terrestrial television, cable television and direct-to-home satellite transmissions. Other platforms include internet streaming, mobile applications and various forms of social media. The group also conducts regular Bible Expositions aired live via satellite in all MCGI local congregations and through the "MCGI Broadcast" mobile app.

== History ==
Soriano started his nightly town-to-town preaching in the 1970s but eventually realized that his lifetime is not enough to reach the entire Philippines. In 1980, he decided to go on radio and after a few years on television to preach the gospel. In 1999, the church took advantage of the advancement in internet technology. Its foray into satellite broadcasting happened in 2004, to reach more souls in different countries around the globe.

In October 1980, the 30-minute radio program Ang Dating Daan was aired on DWWA 1206 kHz with a shoe-string budget. In February 1983, the program made its inaugural broadcast on television through IBC Channel 13. In 1997, the program moved to RJTV Channel 29, government-owned PTV-4 and later on SBN 21. In 1999, the church launched a nationwide radio broadcast through DZRH, RMN and 100 Radyo Natin stations.

== Radio and television ==
The UNTV Public Service channel, Radyo La Verdad 1350 kHz, Wish FM 107.5, The Truth Channel, TV Verdade and TV La Verdad are the official religious media services of the Members Church of God International.

Between 2010 and 2011, the MCGI programs reached the airwaves of India, Uruguay, Argentina, Bolivia and Portugal. To further boost viewership, the church acquired a 30-minute slot on Fox Channel which can be seen in over 50 cable networks in Central and South America. In 2012, MCGI launched its own channel TV La Verdad (English: Truth TV) for Spanish-speaking countries. In 2012, through a blocktime agreement with PBC, MCGI's own radio station in Mega Manila, UNTV Radio La Verdad 1350 kHz was launched.

=== International broadcasts ===
Ang Dating Daan is being aired internationally, with programs usually lasting for an hour or two, through blocktime agreements with local television networks.

MCGI Local Free TV Broadcast (International)

The Old Path (English)

Country/ Continent	TV Station	Schedule
United Kingdom	Revelation TV (Sky Channel 585)	Fri (3pm), Sat (6:30–7:30am, 8:30pm) BST
Ireland	Revelation TV (Sky Channel 581)	Fri (3pm), Sat (6am, 8:30pm) BST
Rome, Italy	Televita Channel 65	Sat (9-10pm)
India	SAB TV	Mon-Sun (5:30–6:30am IST)
Cayman Islands	Island 24	Sun (10-11am)
France	Revelation TV (Sky Channel 581)	Wed (9pm), Sat (10pm) BST
Europe, Canada, Australia, New Zealand	Latino America Television	TBA
United States	Comcast Channel 77	Sun (7-7:30pm), Thu (5pm), Sun (6-7pm)
Seattle, Washington (United States)	Broadstripe Channel 23	Sun (6-7pm)

El Camino Antiguo (Spanish)

Country/ Continent	TV Station	Schedule
Costa Rica	Canal 9	Mon-Fri (5:15–5:45am); Mon-Sat (12:30-1am); Sat-Sun(6:-6:30am)
Argentina	CN23	Daily (5-6am)
Argentina	America 2 TV	TBA
Bolivia	Universal de Television (UNITEL)	Daily (3-5am GMT-4)
Bolivia	TV Universitario Canal 11	Daily (6-7am, 4:05–4:35pm)
Ecuador	Gama TV	Daily (4:30–5:30am)
Peru	Frequencia Latina	Mon-Fri (4-5am)
Uruguay	Teledoce	Mon-Fri (6-7am); Sat/Sun (7-8am)
Mexico	Gala TV	Mon-Fri (5:30-6am)
Nicaragua	Canal 9	Daily (6:30-7am, 10-10:30pm)
Venezuela	La Tele	Daily (7-8pm, 12-1am)
Honduras	Teleceiba	Mon-Fri (5-6am, 3-4pm, 11-12am); Sat-Sun (7-8am, 8:30–9:30pm)
Dominican Republic	Telemedios Canal 25	Mon-Fri (6-7am, 10:30–11:30pm)
Spain (Madrid)	Canal 33	Mon-Fri (8-9pm)
All countries in Central and South America	Fox Channel	Mon-Fri (6:30-7am)

O Caminho Antigo (Portuguese)

Country/ Continent	TV Station	Schedule
Brazil	Canal Rural; Sky-159; Net–135; Astro–35; Viacabo–118; Claro TV–112; Cabonnet–24	Daily (3-6am)
Brazil	CNT Channel 23	Daily (1-2pm)
Portugal	Kurios TV	Daily (8pm)

=== UNTV Public Service channel (Philippines) ===
In 2004, UNTV-37 became the permanent home of MCGI when it acquired an exclusive blocktime agreement with UNTV's parent, the Progressive Broadcasting Corporation. In 2007, the station became a "Public Service Channel" when MCGI affiliate Breakthrough and Milestones Productions International, Inc. (BMPI), acquired the entire production and management operations of UNTV. The station operates 24/7 in Metro Manila and surrounding provinces with a power of 30 kilowatts, with several low-powered relay stations in the provinces. UNTV was aired nationwide via Mabuhay Agila 2. In 2011, UNTV left Agila 2 and transferred its free-to-air broadcast feed to MEASAT-3a satellite which covers Asia and selected parts of Australia, Middle East, Europe and Africa. UNTV is also being carried by Sky Cable and more than 200 local cable operators and Cignal, the largest direct-to-home satellite provider in the Philippines. In 2016 until 2020, it included in the line-up of ABS-CBN's newest DTH service, Sky Direct.

==== Digital terrestrial (ISDB-T) ====
Channel	Frequency	Power	Coverage	Subchannels	Stream	Programming
UHF-38	617.143	TBA	Mega Manila	UNTV-1	SD	UNTV Public Service
UHF-38	617.143	TBA	Mega Manila	UNTV-2	SD	STV (Social TV)
UHF-38	617.143	TBA	Mega Manila	TRUTH CHANNEL	HD	TRUTH Channel
UHF-38	617.143	TBA	Mega Manila	UNTV 1SEG	1seg	UNTV Public Service

==== Analog broadcast ====
UNTV Public Service (Philippines)

Branding	Callsign	Channel	Power (kW)	Station Type	Location
UNTV 37 Manila	DWAO-TV	TV-37	60 kW	Originating	Metro Manila
UNTV 28 Tarlac	DZXT-TV	TV-28	1 kW	Relay	Tarlac
UNTV 44 Naga	DZTR-TV	TV-44	5 kW	Relay	Naga
UNTV 42 Iloilo	DYNY-TV	TV-42	5 kW	Relay	Iloilo
UNTV 28 Bacolod	DYNA-TV	TV-28	10 kW	Relay	Bacolod
UNTV 39 Cebu	DYNU-TV	TV-39	10 kW	Relay	Cebu
UNTV 39 Tacloban	DYNV-TV	TV-39	5 kW	Relay	Tacloban
UNTV 41 Cagayan de Oro	DXNY-TV	TV-41	10 kW	Relay	Cagayan de Oro
UNTV 51 Davao	DXNU-TV	TV-51	10 kW	Relay	Davao
UNTV 48 General Santos	DXNV-TV	TV-48	5 kW	Relay	General Santos
UNTV 37 Surigao	DXNT-TV	TV-37	5 kW	Relay	Surigao

==== Cable television ====
CATV Provider	Type	Channel No.	Coverage
SkyCable	Analog	33	Metro Manila; Rizal; Cavite; Laguna; Bulacan
SkyCable	Digital	58	Metro Manila; Rizal; Cavite; Laguna; Bulacan
Destiny Cable	Analog	9	Metro Manila
Destiny Cable	Digital	58	Metro Manila
Cablelink	Analog/Digital	99	Metro Manila

==== Direct-to-home (DTH) satellite ====
DTH Provider	Satellite	Channel No.	Type	Channel	Coverage
Cignal	SES-7	182	Digital	UNTV Public Service	Philippines
Sky Direct	SES-9	40	Digital	UNTV Public Service	Philippines

=== Radyo La Verdad (Mega Manila and surrounding areas) ===
In late 2011, Breakthrough and Milestones Productions International Inc. (BMPI) took over the management and broadcast operations of Mabuhay Broadcasting System's DZXQ and immediately run a test broadcast using UNTV broadcast feed. On January 16, 2012, it was formally launched as UNTV Radio La Verdad 1350 kHz along with the UNTV Mobile Radio booth, a first in Philippine radio history. It operates in Mega Manila with a 50,000 watts output. On February 13, 2017, the station changed its branding to simply Radyo La Verdad 1350 kHz.

=== Wish 107.5 (Mega Manila and surrounding areas) ===
In 2014, BMPI led by its Chairman and CEO "Kuya" Daniel Razon (also known as "Dr. Clark" on air), took over the management of 107.5 MHz frequency. The station transferred its studios from AIC Gold Tower in Pasig (its home since NU 107 era) to its current studio at UNTV Building in Quezon City. After getting access to 107.5 FM, BMPI finally occupied one of PBC's FM radio frequencies in Mega Manila that solidified its influence including other platforms of PBC on AM and TV, removing its connection to the defunct un-tee-vee era. At the same time, the station's transmitter facilities shifted from the old UNTV transmitter compound in Crestview Subd. to the new UNTV transmission tower in Sumulong Highway, Antipolo City.

=== TV Verdade (Brazil) ===
In December 2009, the church's own religious channel TV Verdade (English: Truth TV) was launched in Brazil, airing O Caminho Antiguo in Portuguese via satellite. Its broadcast feed originates from a small garage, around 48 square meters, transformed into a makeshift broadcasting studio located in Florianópolis, the capital city of the state of Santa Catarina. In 2015, TV Verdade was granted the authority by Ministério das Comunicações (English: Ministry of Communications, abbreviated as "MiniCom") of Brazil to build and operate its own broadcast network. The network roll-out started in Minas Gerais, Brazil's second most populous state then followed by relay stations in the state of Paraná). In May 2016, its relay station in the municipality of Cornélio Procópio in Paraná was activated.

TV Verdade (Brazil)

Branding	Channel	City	State
TV Verdade	UHF 19	Patos de Minas	Minas Gerais
TV Verdade	UHF 40	Juiz de Fora	Minas Gerais
TV Verdade	UHF 50	Montes Claros	Minas Gerais
TV Verdade	UHF 50	Uberaba	Minas Gerais
TV Verdade	UHF 33	Teófilo Otoni	Minas Gerais
TV Verdade	UHF 40	Cornélio Procópio	Paraná
TV Verdade	Test Broadcast	Poços de Caldas	Minas Gerais
TV Verdade	Test Broadcast	Varginha	Minas Gerais
TV Verdade	Test Broadcast	Divinopolis	Minas Gerais
TV Verdade	Test Broadcast	Tibaji	Paraná
TV Verdade	Test Broadcast	São Mateus do Sul	Paraná
TV Verdade	Test Broadcast	Santo Antonio da Platina	Paraná
TV Verdade	Test Broadcast	Dois Vizinhos	Paraná
TV Verdade	Test Broadcast	Corbélia	Paraná
TV Verdade	Test Broadcast	Pinhão	Paraná
TV Verdade	Test Broadcast	Palmas	Paraná
TV Verdade	Test Broadcast	Lapa	Paraná
TV Verdade	Test Broadcast	Umuarama	Paraná
TV Verdade	Test Broadcast	Londrina	Paraná
TV Verdade	Test Broadcast	Maringá	Paraná
TV Verdade	Test Broadcast	Paranavaí	Paraná
TV Verdade	Test Broadcast	Paranaguá	Paraná
TV Verdade	Test Broadcast	Jacarezinho	Paraná
TV Verdade	Test Broadcast	Cruzeiro do Oeste	Paraná
TV Verdade	Test Broadcast	Cianorte	Paraná
TV Verdade	Test Broadcast	Campo Mourão	Paraná

=== TV La Verdad (El Salvador) ===
In February 2014, MCGI began its 24/7 free-to-air terrestrial broadcast of TV La Verdad (English "The Truth TV") in El Salvador, the smallest and most densely populated country in Central America.

TV La Verdad (El Salvador)

Branding	Channel	Country
TV La Verdad	Canal 61	El Salvador

== Satellite broadcasting ==
On October 7, 2004, the church administration signed a contract with GlobeCast to air the TOP Channel in United States and Canada via a direct-to-home satellite broadcast, its own television channel featuring "The Old Path" as flagship program. On March 24, 2010, TOP Channel was aired in the Asia-Pacific region through Dream Satellite TV. Today, MCGI programs are carried by at least seven satellites across the globe.

MCGI Satellite Broadcast

SES-6
Channel	Band	Position	Frequency	Polarity	SR
TV Verdade	C Band	40.5° W	4168 MHz	Left	2400-2/3
TV La Verdad	C Band	40.5° W	4178 MHz	Left	3200-3/4
North America | South America | Europe | North Africa
Galaxy 19
Channel	Band	Position	Frequency	Polarity	SR
The Truth Channel	Ku Band	97.0° W	12060 MHz	Horizontal	22000-3/4
North America USA • Canada • Mexico • Saint Pierre & Miquelon Greenland | Central America Guatemala • Belize, Costa Rica • El Salvador Honduras • Nicaragua • Panama • Caribbean • Antigua & Barbuda • Cuba • Bahamas • Barbados • Dominican Republic • Dominica • Grenada • Haiti • Saint Kitts & Nevis Saint Lucia • Jamaica • Saint Vincent & The Grenadines • Aruba • Trinidad • Tobago, Anguilla • Bermuda Bonaire • Martinique Monsterrat • Saba • Navassa Island • Puerto Rico
Hotbird 6/8/9
Channel	Band	Position	Frequency	Polarity	SR
The Truth Channel	Ku Band	13.0° E	10815 MHz	Horizontal	27500-5/6
North America Morocco • Algeria • Western Sahara • Tunisia • Libya • Egypt | Western Asia Israel • Lebanon • Syria • Jordan • Turkey • Iraq • Saudi Arabia • U.A.E. • Bahrain • Qatar • Armenia • Azerbaijan • Georgia • Kuwait | Central Asia | South Asia | Europe | Western Russia | Northwestern China
Thaicom 5
Channel	Band	Position	Frequency	Polarity	SR
TV Verdade	C Band	78.5° E	3551 MHz	Horizontal	13333-3/4
Asia | Europe | Australia | Africa
Star One C2
Channel	Band	Position	Frequency	Polarity	SR
TV Verdade	C Band	70.0° W	3947 MHz	Horizontal	7200-2/3
South America Argentina • Bolivia • Brazil • Chile • Colombia • Ecuador • Guyana • Paraguay • Peru • Suriname • Uruguay • Venezuela & The Territories of Falkland Islands • French Guiana • South Georgia • South Sandwich Islands
Measat-3A
Channel	Band	Position	Frequency	Polarity	SR
UNTV Public Service	C Band	91.5° E	3705 MHz	Horizontal	4290-3/4
TOP Channel	C Band	91.5° E	3710 MHz	Horizontal	2860-3/4
Asia | Australia | Middle East | Europe | Africa; Note: TOP Channel is exclusive for MCGI worship services (encrypted)
