= STV (Philippines) =

24-hour mainstream digital television channel in the Philippines

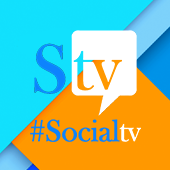
- Type: Broadcast television network
- Country: Philippines
- Broadcast area: Mega Manila (at the time of closure)
- Network: UNTV News and Rescue
- Stations: List of TV Stations
- Transmitters: UNTV Transmitter
- Headquarters: La Verdad Christian College Building, Bagong Barrio, EDSA, Caloocan

Programming
- Languages: Filipino (primary); English (secondary)
- Picture format: NTSC 1080p (HDTV)

Ownership
- Owner: Breakthrough and Milestones Productions International
- Parent: UNTV News and Rescue (PBC & BMPI)
- Key people: Daniel Razon
- Sister channels: List: UNTV (DWAO-TV); Truth Channel; The Truth Channel; TV Verdade; TV La Verdad

History
- Founded: 2018
- Launched: January 15, 2018; 8 years ago
- Founder: Breakthrough and Milestones Productions International
- Replaced: UNTV-2 slot
- Closed: May 4, 2020; 6 years ago
- Replaced by: UNTV (mirror feed)

Links
- Website: www.facebook.com/pg/STV.socialtv (Facebook page)

Social TV (STV) was a 24-hour mainstream digital television channel in the Philippines. It features social media contents and creations such as Do It Yourself (DIY) videos, short films, educational vlogs, documentaries, animation, tutorial, hobbies, music, entertainment and technology trends. It allows its viewers to interact with the TV network and let amateur content producers to share their own content not only on social media but also on free-to-air television.

It was a subchannel of UNTV News and Rescue, the network's carrier on free-to-air digital terrestrial television (DTT). It broadcasts 24 hours a day on Ultra High Frequency (UHF) Channel 38 (617.143 MHz) in Metro Manila, Rizal, Bulacan, Pampanga, Laguna, Cavite and some parts of Tarlac. Its studios in the Philippines are located at the La Verdad Christian College Building, Bagong Barrio, EDSA, Caloocan. Its digital transmitter is located at Emerald Hills, Sumulong Highway in Antipolo, Rizal.

STV was known for its broadcast of behind-the-scenes of UNTV's morning show "Good Morning Kuya" led by broadcast journalist and UNTV-BMPI CEO Daniel Razon. STV claims to be the first and only social mainstream media channel in the Philippines.

== Digitalization ==
UNTV began its digital terrestrial television test broadcast in the last quarter of 2014. UNTV operator BMPI started testing Japan's Integrated Service Digital Broadcasting-Terrestrial (ISDB-T), the sole digital television (DTV) standard in the Philippines for its transition from analog to digital broadcast, on UHF Channel 38 as its frequency.

The network initially activated four subchannels on digital television. UNTV-1, UNTV-2 and UNTV 1-SEG air the same program while ADDTV showcased MCGI praise music videos primarily from A Song of Praise (ASOP) Music Festival. In September 2017, UNTV-BMPI CEO Daniel Razon held an exclusive ceremonial switch-on of Truth Channel during international thanksgiving gathering of the MCGI in Apalit, Pampanga, replacing ADDTV.

On January 15, 2018, BMPI replaced UNTV-2 with its own original programming and subsequently upgraded its broadcast quality to high definition format. However, in 2020, this channel was repurposed to broadcast UNTV's main feed in 1080p resolution. During weekdays, from 11 am to 12:30 pm, it aired a simulcast of Radyo La Verdad's program "Ito Ang Iyong Lingkod: Don Manolo", breaking away from the main feed. This continued until the program's host, Don Manolo Favis, died on December 1, 2023.

=== Final programs ===
- Aghamazing
- Hobbies & Passion
- Minienarts
- Crafty Hackers
- Buhay Nanay
- Flickula
- Foods For Foodies
- Erica Shares
- How To Do It
- Music & Entertainment
- Nognog In The City: The Feed
- Girl Stuff
- Ito Ang Inyong Lingkod: Don Manolo

== Hosts ==
=== Final hosts ===
- Janelle Rose Navalta
- Rodel Flordeliz
- Erica Marisse Honrado
- Kerwin Lawrence Octavo
- Don Manolo Favis

== Digital television stations ==
Branding	Callsign	Channel	Frequency	Station type	Area of coverage
STV	DWAO-DTV	38	617.143 MHz	Originating	Mega Manila

== See also ==
- Ang Dating Daan
- Truth Channel
- Members Church of God International
- UNTV
