= Truth Channel =

Philippine religious television network

- Type: Broadcast television network
- Country: Philippines
- Broadcast area: Mega Manila
- Headquarters: UNTV Broadcast Center, 907 EDSA, Philam Homes, Quezon City, Philippines; ADD Convention Center, Sampaloc, Apalit, Pampanga, Philippines

Programming
- Languages: Filipino, English, Portuguese, Spanish
- Picture format: 1080i (HDTV)

Ownership
- Owner: Members Church of God International
- Parent: UNTV News and Rescue (PBC and BMPI)
- Key people: Eli Soriano; Daniel Razon
- Sister channels: List: UNTV (DWAO-TV); STV; The Truth Channel; TV Verdade; TV La Verdad

History
- Founded: 2014 as ADDTV (test broadcast)
- Launched: September 3, 2017; 8 years ago
- Founder: Members Church of God International
- Former names: Ang Dating Daan Television (2014–2017)

Links
- Website: www.truthchannel.tv

Availability

Terrestrial
- Digital terrestrial television: Channel 55.03

Streaming media
- Truth Channel Live Stream: YouTube

Truth Channel (formerly known as Ang Dating Daan Television or ADDTV) is a Philippine free-to-air religious television network. It is the flagship television network of the Members Church of God International (MCGI), together with UNTV News and Rescue, the network's carrier on free-to-air digital terrestrial television (DTT). It broadcasts 24 hours a day on Ultra High Frequency (UHF) Channel 38 (617.143 MHz) in Metro and Mega Manila, Rizal, Bulacan, Pampanga, Laguna, Cavite and some parts of Tarlac.

== Location ==
Its studios in the Philippines are located at the UNTV Building, 907 Brgy. Philam, Quezon City, and at the ADD Convention Center, Brgy. Sampaloc, MacArthur Highway Apalit, Pampanga. It also has a broadcast facility in South America, MCGI Building studio in Florianópolis, Santa Catarina, Brazil, shared with MCGI's own international TV channels TV Verdade, TV La Verdad and The Truth Channel.

Its digital transmitter is located at Emerald Hills, Sumulong Highway in Antipolo, Rizal. The 16-storey UNTV Broadcast Center along EDSA Philam is currently under construction to serve as its new headquarters by 2018, and it operates 24 hours a day, with the exception of Mondays, where the channel is offline from midnight to 4 am.

== History ==
During UNTV's 9th anniversary celebration in 2013, Kuya Daniel Razon announced the network's ongoing transition from analog to digital broadcast. The activity includes upgrading of technical equipment and studio facilities.

After a year, UNTV began its test broadcast in Mega Manila using its new digital transmitter in Antipolo. On October 2, 2014, UNTV began its simulcast test broadcast on UHF channel 38 (617.143 MHz) along with its analog broadcast on UHF channel 37. It has two (2) standard definition (SD) channels and one 1seg or “oneseg” channel. 1seg is the common name of DTV service specifically for mobile phone devices. UNTV multi-channel line-up also included one high definition (HD) channel called “ADDTV” or “Ang Dating Daan Television” showing purely religious programs and songs of praises. Its digital broadcast can be received in Metro Manila and nearby provinces like Bulacan, Pampanga, Cavite and Rizal, using ISDB-T set top boxes including LED TV sets and mobile devices with built-in ISDB-T tuners. In a DTV signal test conducted by Philippine mobile phone brand Starmobile last April 2015, UNTV was present in eight out of 14 locations in Metro Manila with decent signal strength of three up to the maximum of four signal bars.

== Digitalization ==
On September 3, 2017, Truth Channel formally ceased its test broadcast which began in the last quarter of 2014 as Ang Dating Daan Television (ADDTV) and officially launched its broadcast on digital terrestrial television, using Japan's Integrated Service Digital Broadcasting-Terrestrial (ISDB-T), the sole digital television (DTV) standard in the Philippines for its transition from analog to digital broadcast. on UHF Channel 38 as its frequency, together with the flagship station UNTV.

On the same date, an exclusive ceremonial switch-on led by then-MCGI Assistant Overall Servant Brother Daniel Razon was held at the MCGI Headquarters in Apalit, Pampanga during the "Thanksgiving of God's People" (Tagalog: Pasalamat ng Buong Bayan ng Dios) international gathering of the Members Church of God International.

Truth Channel revamped its programming line-up and introduced a new station identification (ID) and on-screen graphics to reflect major changes. It also launched its slogan "Truth Above All" where it emphasize "Truth" as the TV channel's core value based on the First Epistle to Timothy.

== Programs ==
Truth Channel is known for its broadcast of Itanong mo kay Soriano, a talk show in Bible Exposition format popularized by Ang Dating Daan (ADD), the longest-running religious program in the Philippines, hosted by international radio and television evangelist Bro. Eli Soriano, together with broadcast journalist UNTV-BMPI CEO, Kuya Daniel Razon.

The segment has spontaneous question and answer format where live audience ask questions to the host. The religious program airs in four languages namely Filipino, English, Portuguese and Spanish with English subtitles.

=== Current ===
- Ang Dating Daan Worldwide Bible Study
- Chained
- Confessions
- El Camino Antigo
- Follies of the Hollies
- Guilds
- How Authentic The Bible Is
- Itanong mo kay Soriano, Biblia ang Sasagot
- O Caminho Antiguo
- Straight From the Scriptures
- Street Lab
- Truth in Focus
- World Watch

== Stations ==
=== TV stations ===
==== Digital ====
Branding	Callsign	Channel	Frequency	Station Type	Area of Coverage
Truth Channel	DWAO-DTV	38	617.143 MHz	Originating	Mega Manila

== See also ==
- Ang Dating Daan
- Members Church of God International
- UNTV
- STV (defunct channel)
- Wish 107.5
