= Subic Bay Space Center =

Ground station in the Philippines

- Established: 1996
- Research type: Satellite ground station
- Location: Ilanin Forest West, Subic Bay Free Port, Morong, Bataan, Philippines; 14°45′33.1″N 120°16′47.3″E
- Operating agency: Asia Broadcast Satellite

The Subic Bay Space Center (SCC) also known as the Subic Bay Teleport is a ground station at the Subic Bay Free Port in Morong, Bataan, Philippines. It is currently operated by ABS.

The ground station was built in 1996 as the Mabuhay Satellite Space Center by the Mabuhay Philippines Satellite Corporation (MPSC), a consortium of Philippine telecommunications companies. It was built to manage the operations of Agila-1; the first Philippine-owned satellite. In 2009, Mabuhay and Hong Kong–based ABS signed an agreement in which the former ceded all of its assets including the ground station and the Agila-2 satellite to the latter.
