= List of One True Love episodes =

One True Love is a 2012 Philippine television drama romantic series broadcast by GMA Network. It premiered on the network's Telebabad line up from June 11, 2012 to October 5, 2012, replacing My Beloved.

Mega Manila ratings are provided by AGB Nielsen Philippines.

== Series overview ==
Month	Episodes	Monthly Averages
Month	Episodes	Mega Manila
June 2012	15	21.5%
July 2012	22	22.6%
August 2012	23	22.9%
September 2012	20	26.1%
October 2012	5	27.8%
Total	85	24.2%

== Episodes ==
=== June 2012 ===
No.	Title	Original air date	AGB Nielsen Ratings (Mega Manila)	Timeslot Rank	Primetime Rank	Ref.
1	"Leila Exacts Revenge to Her Husband's Mistress"	June 11, 2012	24.6%	#1	#2	
Since Leila is finding a hard time in conceiving a baby because of her health condition, her husband Carlos cheats on her to impregnate another woman. Upon finding out that Ellen gets pregnant with to the latter, Leila knew she had to exact revenge.
2	"Leila Swaps Ellen's Baby"	June 12, 2012	23.1%	#1	#6	
After Ellen gave birth to her child, Leila never hesitated to swap the former's baby with Dyna's baby.
3	"Ellen Gets Jailed!"	June 13, 2012	22.5%	#1	#6	
Ever since Ellen became firm on her decision of not giving up her child to Leila and Carlos, unfortunate things caused by the latter two will ruin her life.
4	"Leila and Carlos' Greed Turns to Injustice"	June 14, 2012	22.3%	#2	#7	
Ellen will never get to see her child grow as Leila and Carlos made sure that she will face years of imprisonment for a crime she didn't do.
5	"Tisoy's Traumatizing Childhood"	June 15, 2012	23.1%	#1	#5	
Without his parents, Tisoy will have a hard time navigating through the gritty streets of Manila. Will he be able to survive without a guardian to guide him?
6	"Elize and Tisoy's Destiny"	June 18, 2012	20.9%	#1	#7	
As Elize momentarily escapes her luxurious life in their company's party, she accidentally met Tisoy.
7	"Elize and Tisoy's Blossoming Friendship"	June 19, 2012	19.7%	#2	#6	
Despite the disapproval of Elize's parents with her friendship with Tisoy, the two will still find ways on getting to know each other.
8	"Ellen's Search for Her Child Begins"	June 20, 2012	19.7%	#2	#7	
After years of imprisonment, Ellen will finally be able to exact her revenge and get her child back from Carlos and Leila as she finally gets out of jail.
9	"Leila Threatens Ellen Again"	June 21, 2012	20.4%	#2	#8	
When Leila found out that Ellen is finally free from her imprisonment, she will do everything in her power to keep Elize away from her biological mother.
10	"Ellen and Tisoy Get Into a Heated Argument"	June 22, 2012	22.7%	#2	#4	
Ellen and Tisoy meet for the first time in a very tough situation which will lead the former to hurt her biological son.
11	"Tisoy's First Move for Elize"	June 25, 2012	18.9%	#2	#8	
Despite the difference of their social status, Tisoy makes his first move to Elize.
12	"Ghost from Leila's Past Sins"	June 26, 2012	20.9%	#2	#8	
Leila cannot be complacent with her life right now as people she hurt from the past will slowly make way to enter her life again.
13	'"Elize Misses Tisoy's Company"	June 27, 2012	21.4%	#2	#6	
After Elize got ditched by Tisoy, she will finally give up on communicating with him. Will she be able to cope up with Tisoy's cold treatment towards her?
14	"Elize Makes a Confession"	June 28, 2012	21.5%	#2	#7	
Tisoy can't believe that Elize is now his girlfriend when the latter confessed that she loves him too.
15	"Ellen Ruins Tisoy's Reputation"	June 29, 2012	21.1%	#2	#6	
Ellen can't help but inform Carlos that Elize is having a secret affair with his assistant, Tisoy. How will Carlos react to this?

=== July 2012 ===
No.	Title	Original air date	AGB Nielsen Ratings (Mega Manila)	Timeslot Rank	Primetime Rank	Ref.
16	"Elize and Tisoy's Secret Relationship, Revealed!"	July 2, 2012	20.5%	#2	#7	
Elize is oblivious to the fact that Carlos is following her to find out if she is in a relationship with Tisoy.
17	"Ellen Makes a Surprise Appearance"	July 3, 2012	22.3%	#2	#8	
Leila and Carlos couldn't believe that Ellen turns out to be Henry’s new girlfriend. Will this mark the end of their alliance with the Mayor?
18	"Marla Helps Elize Escapes from Her Parents"	July 4, 2012	21.0%	#2	#8	
Elize couldn't believe that Marla would help her escape from her parents.
19	"Tisoy Breaks Elize's Heart"	July 5, 2012	21.3%	#2	#7	
Tisoy was shocked upon seeing Elize again but what caught him off-guard was that the latter wants to elope with him.
20	"Carlos Makes Tisoy's Life Miserable"	July 6, 2012	22.3%	#2	#3	
As if separating Tisoy and Elize wasn’t enough, Carlos also hires people to make the former’s life a living hell.
21	"Elize Deceives Her Own Father"	July 9, 2012	20.6%	#2	#8	
Carlos can’t believe that Elize will forgive him that easily after all the cruel things he has done to Tisoy.
22	"Struggle of the Runaway Lovers"	July 10, 2012	20.7%	#2	#7	
How will Elize and Tisoy manage to escape from Carlos if the latter is willing to turn their small town upside down just to get his only daughter back?
23	"The Agonizing Search for Elize and Tisoy"	July 11, 2012	22.6%	#1	#6	
While their families search for Elize and Tisoy, the truth that Leila keeps on burying from the past will resurface as Dyna realizes that she is Elize’s biological mother.
24	"Elize's Life is in Danger"	July 12, 2012	22.8%	#1	#6	
Now that Elize’s condition is critical, Carlos will surely not let Tisoy see her daughter ever again.
25	"Elize Loses Her Memory"	July 13, 2012	23.4%	#1	#3	
Due to Elize’s head injury, she will suffer from losing her memories temporarily and her parents will use her condition to their advantage.
26	"Carlos Pays Tisoy a Surprise Visit"	July 16, 2012	21.8%	#1	#6	
Carlos will finally resolve their problem with Tisoy as Elize’s condition improves. Will they be able to make amends?
27	"Tisoy's Man-to-Man Talk With Carlos"	July 17, 2012	22.8%	#1	#5	
Will Carlos and Tisoy finally come to a deal after their serious talk with each other?
28	"The Last Chance for Tisoy"	July 18, 2012	23.2%	#1	#3	
After Tisoy agreed with Carlos’ conditions, the latter will also give him a chance to see Elize one last time.
29	"Karma Keeps Up With Carlos"	July 19, 2012	25.1%	#1	#4	
Ellen will never give up on getting her child back even though she gets bombarded with Carlos and Leila’s threats. What could be her plan this time?
30	"Carlos' Illegal Business Gets Compromised"	July 20, 2012	24.2%	#1	#2	
Will Carlos be able to get out of prison after Ellen reported all of his illegal businesses to the authority?
31	"Elize Discovers the Truth About Her Father"	July 23, 2012	22.5%	#1	#5	
Elize can’t believe that Carlos is involved in smuggling, provoking her to run away again.
32	"Elize's Fading Memories"	July 24, 2012	24.5%	#1	#5	
Elize keeps on forgetting things, causing Carlos to feel confused as to what kind of nonsense his daughter is trying to pull off.
33	"Leila's Shocking Revelation"	July 25, 2012	23.9%	#1	#3	
When Leila found out that Elize called Marla as an outsider in their family, the former almost told her daughter that she’s also adopted.
34	"Elize Forgets the Most Important Person in Her Life"	July 26, 2012	23.0%	#1	#6	
Elize’s memory loss worsens every day and her negligence in seeking medical attention resulted in forgetting Tisoy.
35	"Elize Gets Diagnosed With Brain Tumor"	July 27, 2012	24.8%	#1	#2	
Elize is having a hard time dealing with the fact that she has a brain tumor especially now that her parents can’t seem to give her the attention she needs.
36	"Elize's Emotional Date With Tisoy"	July 30, 2012	21.9%	#1	#7	
As Elize finds out that she has a brain tumor, she asks Tisoy to go on a date with her despite promising their parents that they would not be seeing each other.
37	"A Devastating News for Carlos"	July 31, 2012	22.7%	#1	#5	
How will Carlos react once he finds out that Elize is hiding her condition?

=== August 2012 ===
No.	Title	Original air date	AGB Nielsen Ratings (Mega Manila)	Timeslot Rank	Primetime Rank	Ref.
38	"The Missing Puzzle Piece in Elize's Life"	August 1, 2012	23.7%	#1	#5	
Is it the perfect time for Elize to finally know who her biological mother is before she undergoes a life-threatening operation for her brain tumor?
39	"Elize Begs for Mercy"	August 2, 2012	—N/a			
Elize is afraid that she might not recover after her operation so she will ask Ellen a favor. What could this be?
40	"A Tough Time for Elize"	August 3, 2012	24.9%	#1	#4	
Even though Elize has two mothers and Carlos by her side during her healing process, she can’t help but feel devastated with the repercussions of her surgery.
41	"A Big Day for Tisoy"	August 6, 2012	21.9%	#1	#7	
Will Tisoy be able to concentrate on his exams after finding out what happened to Elize?
42	"Tisoy's Unexpected Visit at the Hospital"	August 7, 2012	16.2%	#1	#7	
After his exams, Tisoy will finally be able to visit Elize at the hospital but the latter seems to be unhappy with his presence.
43	"The Suspect Behind Henry's Assassination"	August 8, 2012	17.8%	#1	#7	
After his exams, Tisoy will finally be able to Will Carlos pay for the crime he did not commit as Ellen informs the authorities that he has something to do with Henry’s assassination?
44	"A Hopeful Day for Tisoy"	August 9, 2012	21.3%	#1	#5	
After the release of his exam results, Tisoy will share the exciting news to his family and Elize.
45	"Elize Makes a Painful Decision"	August 10, 2012	22.2%	#1	#6	
Elize will have a hard time choosing whom she wants to stay with as Leila and Ellen already gave her an ultimatum.
46	"Elize's Unknown Health Condition"	August 13, 2012	22.4%	#1	#5	
Elize unexpectedly falls ill again and her parents are not sure if her condition is getting worse or if she’s just getting frustrated with her family's fight for her custody.
47	"Carlos' Growing Suspicion About Leila"	August 14, 2012	22.7%	#1	#5	
Carlos starts to doubt Leila upon finding out Elize's blood type is not the same as his. Will he finally discover his wife’s secret from the past?
48	"Dyna Questions Leila's Maternal Instinct"	August 15, 2012	24.8%	#1	#5	
Will Ellen be able to understand the hints Dyna has been giving her about their daughter, Elize?
49	"Death Chases Elize"	August 16, 2012	24.4%	#1	#3	
Elize’s second chance at life did not last long as her doctors found out that another tumor had developed in her brain.
50	"Ellen and Leila's Blooming Friendship"	August 17, 2012	23.2%	#1	#2	
Will Ellen and Leila be able to set aside their feud now that Elize is going through the hardest moment of her life?
51	"Elize Goes Gravely Ill"	August 20, 2012	23.1%	#1	#4	
After Elize had a near-death experience during her radiation therapy, her parents will have no choice but to take the toughest option.
52	"Carlos Finds Out the Truth About the Past"	August 21, 2012	22.6%	#1	#5	
Carlos felt the worst devastation in his life as he finds out the results of his DNA test with Elize.
53	"Leila's Wicked Lies"	August 22, 2012	20.7%	#1	#6	
Leila luckily dodges Carlos’ anger as she twists the past into a narrative which completely blames Ellen.
54	"Carlos' Miserable Life"	August 23, 2012	22.5%	#1	#5	
After finding out that Elize is not his real daughter, Carlos will start to be a drunkard to forget everything.
55	"Carlos and Ellen's Unanswered Questions"	August 24, 2012	22.9%	#1	#6	
Unanswered questions and emotional baggage from Elize’s loved ones might delay her trip to America for her treatment plan.
56	"Carlos' Unexpected Visit to Tisoy"	August 27, 2012	22.6%	#1	#4	
Despite knowing about their similarities, Carlos will humiliate Tisoy once again—not knowing that he is closer to the truth that will lead him to his real child.
57	"Leila Gets Exposed"	August 28, 2012	23.3%	#1	#4	
As Carlos finds out the result of Ellen and Elize’s DNA test, he will make sure that Leila will pay her unruly dues.
58	"Carlos' Biggest Regret"	August 29, 2012	24.9%	#1	#3	
Because of Carlos’ threat, Candice finally reveals the former that Tisoy is his missing child.
59	"Tisoy's Father is Alive!"	August 30, 2012	28.6%	#1	#1	
How will Carlos be able to tell Tisoy that he's his missing son when he ridiculed him all his life?
60	"Carlos' Sudden Change of Heart"	August 31, 2012	28.0%	#1	#1	
Tisoy is confused as to why Carlos seems to be treating him nicely at the office—not knowing that the latter is hiding a big secret from him.

=== September 2012 ===
No.	Title	Original air date	AGB Nielsen Ratings (Mega Manila)	Timeslot Rank	Primetime Rank	Ref.
61	"Jail Time for Carlos"	September 3, 2012	27.2%	#1	#2	
Henry will put Carlos in jail upon gathering enough evidence proving the latter is the one who planned his assassination.
62	"Leila Learns Her Lesson"	September 4, 2012	25.7%	#1	#3	
Before Ellen goes back to the Philippines, Leila will try to make amends with her. Will the former accept her apology?
63	"Carlos Makes It Up for Tisoy"	September 5, 2012	27.4%	#1	#1	
To make it up for lost time, Carlos grants Tisoy and his family a new house without knowing that he is the latter's biological father.
64	"Ellen's Sweet Victory"	September 6, 2012	26.1%	#1	#2	
After winning the elections, Carlos will try use Ellen’s success for his own good. Will the latter take the bait from him?
65	"Carlos and Tisoy Finally Reconcile"	September 7, 2012	26.5%	#1	#1	
Now that Tisoy appears to be in good terms with Carlos, will the latter be able to tell him the truth that he’s his biological father?
66	"Henry Took His Own Life"	September 10, 2012	25.4%	#1	#4	
How will Ellen continue with her life after Henry committed suicide?
67	"A New Obstacle for Ellen"	September 11, 2012	24.1%	#1	#4	
Now that Henry is gone, Ellen still doesn’t know how would she able to do things on her own especially now that she is the newly elected Mayor of their town.
68	"Elize is Back in Town"	September 12, 2012	26.5%	#1	#2	
Elize and Leila will surprise their family by returning to the Philippines sooner than they planned.
69	"Leila Cleans Up Her Mess"	September 13, 2012	27.8%	#1	#1	
Is Leila ready to pay for the sins that she committed from the past?
70	"Carlos Faces His Fears"	September 14, 2012	27.2%	#1	#1	
Carlos finally had the courage to explain everything to Tisoy. How would the latter react upon seeing his real father?
71	"Carlos' Miserable State"	September 17, 2012	22.1%	#1	#5	
Carlos doesn't know whether Tisoy will still be able to forgive him. Without his son by his side, he can't honestly think about the future.
72	"Tisoy's Surprise Guest"	September 18, 2012	26.0%	#1	#3	
Will Carlos successfully bring Elize to Tisoy’s graduation?
73	"Tisoy Goes Back to Square One"	September 19, 2012	25.0%	#1	#4	
How will Tisoy reacts once he finds out that Elize no longer recognizes him as her boyfriend?
74	"Bittersweet Memories from the Past"	September 20, 2012	25.9%	#1	#3	
Tisoy will court Elize again to help her remember their past. Will it work out this time?
75	"Tisoy's Desperate Heart"	September 21, 2012	28.5%	#1	#1	
Even if Elize keeps on telling Tisoy to just forget her and move on with his life, the latter will stop at nothing just so he could reach out to her.
76	"Tisoy Courts Elize Again"	September 24, 2012	26.3%	#1	#3	
Will Elize let Tisoy court her again even if she’s not sure if she can reciprocate his love?
77	"The Fight for Elize's Heart"	September 25, 2012	24.4%	#1	#4	
How will Tisoy keep up with courting Elize when Troy is much more privileged than him?
78	"Tisoy Gets Greedy"	September 26, 2012	25.6%	#1	#2	
After seeing Troy kiss Elize, Tisoy will get more aggressive on helping her remember him to the extent where he already hurt his ex-girlfriend.
79	"Tisoy Tries To Move On From Elize"	September 27, 2012	26.8%	#1	#1	
Will Carla be able to help Tisoy move on after getting dumped by Elize?
80	"Tisoy and Ellen's Emotional Reunion"	September 28, 2012	28.3%	#1	#1	
Tisoy and Ellen had been deprived of the truth for years and now that they’re in each other’s arms, the latter will make sure that they’ll never get separated again.

=== October 2012 ===
No.	Title	Original air date	AGB Nielsen Ratings (Mega Manila)	Timeslot Rank	Primetime Rank	Ref.
81	"Elize's Final Days"	October 1, 2012	27.9%	#1	#1	
Elize’s family were in shock after the doctor announced that she only has a few months to live. How will they be able to tell her about this?
82	"Tisoy Drowns Himself in Alcohol"	October 2, 2012	26.4%	#1	#2	
Tisoy gets emotionally and physically exhausted upon finding out that Elize is dying so he will find a place where he can escape from the heaviness of the situation.
83	"Tisoy's Grand Surprise for Elize"	October 3, 2012	27.4%	#1	#1	
Tisoy will ask Carlos for money so he can plan an expensive surprise for Elize.
84	"Elize Finally Remembers Tisoy"	October 4, 2012	28.9%	#1	#1	
After their movie date, Elize will finally remember who Tisoy is in her life.
85	"Remembering Tisoy's One True Love"	October 5, 2012	28.2%	#1	#1	
Tisoy owes his success to Elize as she is the one who taught him to love and dream big so he will make sure to pour his heart out with everything he does for his future just like what she taught him to.
