= The Truth Channel =

- Type: Religious broadcasting, television network
- Branding: The Truth Channel; The Truth TV
- Country: Brazil, Philippines
- Owner: Members Church of God International
- Key people: Bro. Eli Soriano; Bro. Daniel Razon
- Launch date: 2016 (as The Truth Channel); 2004 (as TOP Channel)
- Former names: TOP Channel (in North America)
- Affiliates: TV Verdade; TV La Verdad
- Official website: www.theoldpath.tv

The Truth Channel (also called as "The Truth TV"), originally The Old Path (TOP) Channel, is a religious broadcast station of the Members Church of God International (MCGI), an international Christian organization with headquarters in the Philippines. Formerly called as TOP Channel, The Truth Channel carries the 24/7 English broadcast of Ang Dating Daan (English: The Old Path), the longest-running religious program in the Philippines, hosted by international televangelist and MCGI's Overall Servant Bro. Eli Soriano for English-speaking countries in North America, Middle East, Europe and Asia. The MCGI leadership decided to air The Old Path program using several satellites to increase its reach and expand the propagation efforts of the church on a global scale.

== History ==
=== The Old Path ===
The Old Path (TOP) Channel logo

The Old Path (TOP) Channel (branded as TOP Channel) was founded as a religious broadcast station owned and operated by the Members Church of God International (MCGI), an international Christian organization with headquarters in the Philippines. The station carries the 24/7 English broadcast of Ang Dating Daan (English: The Old Path), the longest-running religious program in the Philippines, hosted by international televangelist and MCGI's Overall Servant Bro. Eli Soriano for English-speaking countries in North America, Middle East, Europe and Asia.

=== GlobeCast World TV ===
On October 7, 2004, MCGI signed an agreement with GlobeCast World TV, a direct-broadcast satellite (DBS) provider using the Galaxy 19 satellite, to air the TOP Channel in the United States and Canada. The TOP Channel aired MCGI's flagship program, "The Old Path", the English version of Ang Dating Daan hosted by Bro. Eli Soriano. Program line-up also includes the program's question and answer segment "Ask Soriano, the Bible will Answer" (Tagalog: Itanong Mo Kay Soriano, Biblia ang Sasagot).

=== Dream Satellite TV ===
On March 24, 2010, MCGI launched the 24/7 TOP Channel in the Asia-Pacific region via Dream Satellite TV. Owned by Philippine Multi-Media System, Inc., Dream Satellite was the first all-digital DTH television provider in the Philippines using the Mabuhay Agila 2 satellite in the Ku band. On March 24, 2010, Daniel Razon in his morning show Good Morning Kuya, led the TOP Channel's live switch-on ceremony held at the Dream Broadcast Center located at the Clark Special Economic Zone in Pampanga. The TOP Channel showcased 10 new programs and was assigned at Dream channel 10 along with sister station UNTV Channel 37 at Dream channel 9 and exclusively available to Dream Satellite subscribers. It also carries the Mandarin version of The Old Path in the whole of the Philippines and nearby countries. The church aims to reach coastal areas where analog terrestrial free-to-air broadcast signals are weak and where cable television is not available. In 2010, Dream Satellite started closing its transponders in Agila 2 satellite, reaching its end-of-life within 2 years, and transferred all its channels including the TOP Channel to Koreasat 5 satellite in 2011.

In 2013, Dream Satellite removed the TOP Channel from its channel line-up. In the same year, GlobeCast discontinued its pay television service. In 2013, Dream Satellite removed both the TOP Channel and UNTV from its channel line-up. In the same year also, Cignal Digital TV, a direct-to-home satellite television provider owned by MediaQuest Holdings Inc. under the PLDT Group and a direct competitor of Dream, added UNTV in its lineup at channel 92 (now reassigned to Channel 182). The TOP Channel however, was not included.

=== Thaicom 5 satellite ===
On November 1, 2011, The TOP Channel began airing in larger parts of India, Australia, Africa, Middle East and Europe through direct-to-home satellite broadcast via Thaicom 5 satellite.

=== Galaxy 19 and Hotbird satellite ===
When Globecast discontinued its pay television service in 2013, TOP Channel continues to air in the Galaxy 19 satellite. The church also tapped Intelsat to air the TOP Channel in the Ku band through the Hotbird satellite.

On September 15, 2011, the church launched a large-scale satellite broadcast of The Old Path in Europe, Africa and the Middle East via Eutelsat Hot Bird 6/8/9 satellite, making it available even to countries where non-Islam religions are banned.

=== Measat 3A Global satellite ===
In November 2011, the TOP Channel started airing on Measat 3A, a communications satellite operated by Malaysian firm MEASAT Satellite Systems Sdn. Bhd with a global footprint which covers Asia, Australia, Middle East, Europe and Africa. It uses the DVB-S standard and MPEG-2 video format, primarily to broadcast MCGI gatherings such as worship services and live thanksgiving celebrations. However, this channel is using "Viewcypt" encryption system, wherein access is limited to 1,935 MCGI local congregations (also known as satellite monitoring centers) worldwide, equipped with a proprietary Integrated Receiver-Decoder (IRD) box and a C band satellite dish to receive live broadcast feed from its headquarters in Apalit, Pampanga.

=== The Truth Channel ===
In 2016, the TOP Channel was rebranded as "The Truth Channel" to align its name with the other stations of the church, "TV Verdade" (English: Truth TV) for Portuguese-speaking countries and "TV La Verdad" (English: Truth TV) for Spanish-speaking countries. The Truth Channel's broadcast feed originates from the MCGI headquarters in Apalit, Pampanga while most of its content are recorded from its broadcast studio in Florianópolis, Santa Catarina, Brazil, sharing space with its affiliate stations TV Verdade and TV La Verdad.

== Satellite broadcast ==
The Truth Channel can be accessed by entering certain parameters in satellite receivers.

| Satellite | Channel ID | Band | Position | Frequency | Polarity | SR | Coverage |
|---|---|---|---|---|---|---|---|
| Hot Bird 6/8/9 | The Truth Channel (The Old Path TV) | Ku band | 13.0° E | 10815 MHz | Horizontal (H) | 27500-5/6 | North America; Western Asia; Central Asia; South Asia; Europe; Western Russia; Northwestern China |
| Galaxy 19 | The Truth Channel (The Old Path TV) | Ku band | 97° W | 12060 MHz | Horizontal (H) | 22000-3/4 | North America; Central America |
| Thaicom 5 | The Truth Channel (The Old Path TV) | C band | 78.5° E | 3551 MHz | Horizontal (H) | 13333-3/4 | Asia; Europe; Australia; Africa |

== Internet streaming ==
Laptop and desktop users can watch the live 24/7 internet streaming of The Truth Channel by launching theoldpath.tv, the official website of The Old Path program in English.

== Mobile application ==
On February 11, 2014, MCGI launched the MCGI Broadcast App for Apple iOS and Google Android mobile and tablet devices. In 2016, it was made available to Windows Mobile device users. By downloading the mobile application, users with stable internet connection will be able to watch the broadcast feed of The Truth Channel for free.

| Application | Platform | Download Link |
|---|---|---|
| MCGI Broadcast App | Apple iOS | Apple iTunes Store |
| MCGI Broadcast App | Google Android | Google Play Store |
| MCGI Broadcast App | Microsoft Windows Mobile | Microsoft Store |
