= TV Verdade =

Brazilian religious television network

- Type: Religious television network
- Country: Brazil
- Broadcast area: Portuguese-speaking countries
- Stations: List of TV Stations
- Headquarters: Florianópolis, Santa Catarina

Programming
- Languages: Portuguese (primary); English (secondary)
- Picture format: NTSC 480i (4:3 SDTV); 16:9 1080p (HDTV)

Ownership
- Owner: Members Church of God International
- Key people: Eli Soriano; Daniel Razon
- Sister channels: List: TV Verdade HD; UNTV; STV; The Truth Channel; TV La Verdad; Truth Channel

History
- Founded: 2009
- Launched: December 26, 2009; 16 years ago
- Founder: Members Church of God International

Links
- Webcast: ocaminhoantigo.tv/24-7-live-stream
- Website: http://www.ocaminhoantigo.tv

Availability

Terrestrial
- Terrestrial television: List: UHF 19 (Patos de Minas); UHF 40 (Juiz de Fora); UHF 50 (Montes Claros); UHF 48 (Uberava); UHF 33 (Teofilo Otoni); UHF 46 (Belem); UHF 27 (Perolina); UHF 40 (Aracaju); UHF 49 (Natal); UHF 40 (Cornélio Procópio)

Streaming media
- TV VERDADE 24/7: YouTube; Facebook
- MCGI Broadcast: O Caminho Antiguo

TV Verdade (lit. 'Truth TV') is a multinational Brazilian-based religious broadcast station of the international Christian organization, Members Church of God International (Portuguese: Membros da Igreja de Deus Internacional) for the Portuguese-speaking countries.

TV Verdade airs 24 hours a day, 7 days a week via Star One C2 satellite in South American countries and SES-6 satellite which also covers South American countries as a redundancy, including other nations in North America, Europe and North Africa.

Its studios are located in a broadcast facility, a garage transformed into a makeshift studio in Florianópolis, Santa Catarina, Brazil, shared with MCGI's other television stations, TV La Verdad and The Truth Channel.

It is known for its broadcast of O Caminho Antigo (English: The Old Path, Tagalog: Ang Dating Daan), the longest-running religious program in the Philippines, hosted by international televangelist Bro. Eli Soriano and Kuya Daniel Razon of the Members Church of God International.

== History ==
=== 2009–2012 ===
==== Early years ====
On December 26, 2009, During the second day of the International Thanksgiving of MCGI, Bro. Eli Soriano (via live video streaming) announced the launched of a new television channel outside the Philippines, the Brethren of the church gathered worldwide. A huge crowd gathered at the ADD Convention Center in Apalit, Pampanga cheered as the then-Presiding Minister showed the new TV network's logo on LED screens positioned across the center.

TV Verdade's test broadcast started in December 2009. Its broadcast feed originates from a small garage, around 48 square meters, transformed into a makeshift broadcasting studio located in Florianópolis, Santa Catarina, Brazil. It originally aired the Portuguese and Spanish versions of Ang Dating Daan until 2012 when TV La Verdad was release.

=== 2012–present ===
The station currently carries the 24-hour Portuguese broadcast of O Caminho Antigo (English: The Old Path, Tagalog: Ang Dating Daan), the longest-running religious program in the Philippines.

==== Free to air broadcasting ====
In 2015, TV Verdade was granted the authority by the Ministry of Communications (Portuguese: Ministério das Comunicações, abbreviated MiniCom) to build and operate its own television network in Brazil, initially in Minas Gerais, the second most populous state the country. Roll-out of its analog relay stations in various cities in the state of Paraná is ongoing.

==== High-definition television ====
In December 2016, TV Verdade HD was launched in high definition (HD) format (1080p) for households in South and Central America and some parts of North America via SES-6 for free. It also completed the upgrade of its satellite systems, production facilities, including the acquisition of HD cameras in South America to comply with the requirements of the Ministry of Communications in Brazil.

==== 2020s ====
===== COVID-19 Pandemic =====
In April 2020, O Caminho Antiguo began its live broadcast with all of its host and viewers are online, as the world prepares for the COVID-19 pandemic.

In May 2020, the Members Church of God International announced the release of the Oração Global pela Humanidade (English: Global Prayer for Humanity) in different languages including Portuguese virtually, it aims to gather people from across the globe, with different races and religions in praying together and asking for God's help and mercy during these perilous times in the pandemic.

In June 2020, O Caminho Antiguo introduced for the first time to the public the O Caminho Antiguo: Doutrinação em Massa through TV Verdade and different social media platforms in preparation for the new normal.

The Members Church of God International has conducted a series of relief operations in Latin America where cases of COVID-19 continue to surge. Volunteers have brought food and supplies and church members delivered relief assistance using their own vehicles, while still observing all the safety protocols while distributing the goods.

== Programs ==
=== Current ===
- O Caminho Antiguo (2009)
  - O Caminho Antiguo: Doutrinação em Massa (2020)
- Oração Comunitária (2011)
- Oração Global pela Humanidade (2020)
- Pergunte ao Irmão Eli Soriano, A Bíblia Responderá (2009)

=== Former ===
- El Camino Antiguo (2009-2012; moved to TV La Verdad)

== Satellite Broadcast ==
TV Verdade can be received via satellite in Brazil and other countries in Asia, Australia, North America, South America, Europe and Africa.

The network formerly broadcast on analog satellite on Star One D2, being the final analog satellite channel in Brazil. Its analog broadcasts ended 25 August 2025.

Satellite	Channel	Band	Position	Frequency	Polarity	SR	Coverage
Star One D2*	TV Verdade	C Band	70.0° W	4105 MHz	Horizontal (H)	7200-2/3	South America
SES-6*	TV Verdade	C Band	40.5 ° W	4196 MHz	Left (L)	2400-2/3	South America; North America; Europe; North Africa
Thaicom 5 (Decommissioned)	TV Verdade	C Band	78.5° E	3551 MHz	Horizontal (H)	13333-3/4	Asia Europe Australia Africa

* On-Air

== Stations ==
Branding	Ch. #	City	State
TV Verdade	UHF 19	Patos de Minas	Minas Gerais
TV Verdade	UHF 40	Juiz de Fora	Minas Gerais
TV Verdade	UHF 50	Montes Claros	Minas Gerais
TV Verdade	UHF 48	Uberaba	Minas Gerais
TV Verdade	UHF 33	Teófilo Otoni	Minas Gerais
TV Verdade	UHF 46	Belém	Pará
TV Verdade	UHF 27	Petrolina	Pernambuco
TV Verdade	UHF 40	Aracaju	Sergipe
TV Verdade	UHF 49	Natal	Rio Grande do Norte
TV Verdade	UHF 40	Cornélio Procópio	Paraná
TV Verdade	Test Broadcast	Poços de Caldas	Minas Gerais
TV Verdade	Test Broadcast	Varginha	Minas Gerais
TV Verdade	Test Broadcast	Divinopolis	Minas Gerais
TV Verdade	Test Broadcast	Tibaji	Paraná
TV Verdade	Test Broadcast	São Mateus do Sul	Paraná
TV Verdade	Test Broadcast	Santo Antonio da Platina	Paraná
TV Verdade	Test Broadcast	Dois Vizinhos	Paraná
TV Verdade	Test Broadcast	Corbélia	Paraná
TV Verdade	Test Broadcast	Pinhão	Paraná
TV Verdade	Test Broadcast	Palmas	Paraná
TV Verdade	Test Broadcast	Lapa	Paraná
TV Verdade	Test Broadcast	Umuarama	Paraná
TV Verdade	Test Broadcast	Londrina	Paraná
TV Verdade	Test Broadcast	Maringá	Paraná
TV Verdade	Test Broadcast	Paranavaí	Paraná
TV Verdade	Test Broadcast	Paranaguá	Paraná
TV Verdade	Test Broadcast	Jacarezinho	Paraná
TV Verdade	Test Broadcast	Cruzeiro do Oeste	Paraná
TV Verdade	Test Broadcast	Cianorte	Paraná
TV Verdade	Test Broadcast	Campo Mourão	Paraná

== Mobile application ==
On February 11, 2014, MCGI launched the MCGI Broadcast App for iOS and Android for mobile and tablet devices. In 2016, it was also made available to Windows Mobile device users. By downloading the mobile application, users with stable internet connection will be able to watch the broadcast feed of TV Verdade for free.
