= ABS-3 =

Communications satellite acquired by ABS

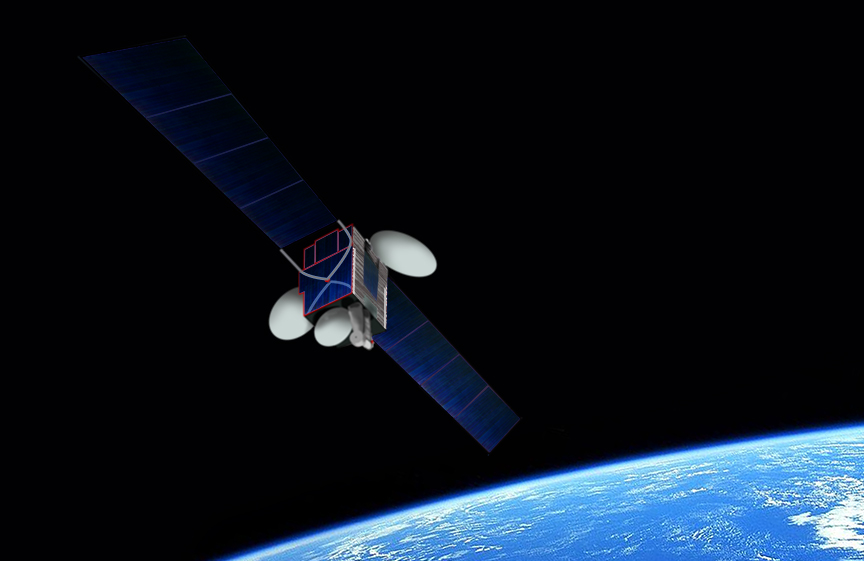
- Artist impression of ABS-3 in orbit
- Names: Agila-2 (1997–2009); ABS-5 (2009–2011); ABS-3 (2011–2017)
- Mission type: Communications
- Operator: Mabuhay (1997–2009); ABS (2009–2017)
- COSPAR ID: 1997-042A
- SATCAT no.: 24901
- Mission duration: Planned: 15 years Total: 20 years

Spacecraft properties
- Bus: LS-1300
- Manufacturer: Space Systems/Loral
- Launch mass: 3,775 kg (8,322 lb)
- Dry mass: 1,800 kg (4,000 lb)

Start of mission
- Launch date: 19 August 1997, 17:50 UTC
- Rocket: Chang Zheng 3B
- Launch site: Xichang 2

End of mission
- Disposal: Decommissioned
- Last contact: August 2017

Orbital parameters
- Reference system: Geocentric
- Regime: Geostationary

ABS-3, formerly ABS-5, was initially named Agila 2 after the Philippine eagle, before being acquired by ABS (formerly known as Asia Broadcast Satellite). Launched in 1997, the satellite provided telecommunications services for Mabuhay Satellite Corporation before being sold to ABS in 2009. Built by Space Systems/Loral, the satellite provided coverage in the Asia-Pacific region. Its control station is located at the Subic Bay Freeport Zone in the Philippines. The satellite was launched by Long March 3B and positioned at 146°E longitude.

While it was the first Filipino-owned satellite to be launched into space, it is not the first Filipino satellite. Another satellite named Mabuhay, previously known as Palapa B-2P, was acquired from Indonesian company Pasifik Satelit Nusantara a year earlier, becoming the first satellite owned by a Filipino entity.

In 2011, ABS-5 was renamed ABS-3 and repositioned to the 3°W orbital slot. ABS-3A was launched on 1 March 2015 to replace ABS-3, which was relocated to operate at 15.75 WL and later at 85.3EL. In August 2017, ABS-3 was deorbited from the geostationary arc and retired after nearly 20 years of operation.

== Capacity ==
ABS-3 consisted of 30 C-band transponders at 27 watts and 24 Ku-band transponders at 110 watts, combining to 12 high-power 220-watt transponders. The total DC power at End of Life (EOL) was expected to be 8200 watts. The combination provides a power-to-mass ratio of 5:1, making ABS-3 one of the most efficient satellites in the industry. The satellite is able to transmit 190 channels of high-fidelity digital programming to cable companies and home satellite dishes, as well as handle 50,000 simultaneous two-way telephone conversations.

== Design ==
In the beginning, ABS-3 or Agila-2 was a joint venture between Mabuhay Satellite Corporation and various companies, namely, the Philippine Long Distance Telephone Company (PLDT), High Rise Realty Development Corporation, Pilipino Telephone Corp. (Piltel), Beijing High Den Enterprises Limited, Walden Group of Companies, GMA Network, Philippine Satellite Corporation, Cable Entertainment Corporation, Siy Yap Group, and Philippine Communications Satellite Corporation. The satellite's cost was estimated at US$243 million and has a design based on the Space Systems/Loral FS-1300 satellite bus. ABS-3 was deployed to orbit by a Chinese Long March 3B rocket in Sichuan province on 20 August 1997. The satellite was expected to operate for 15 years.

== Reach ==
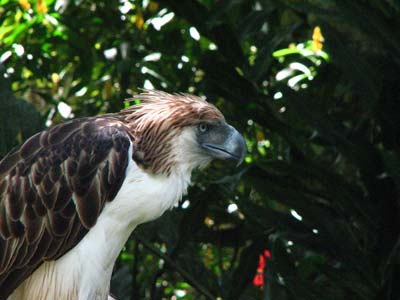
"Agila" is the local name for the Philippine eagle

ABS-3's Ku-band coverage zone encompasses Taiwan, portions of mainland China, Vietnam and the Philippines. The 24 Ku-band transponders of the satellite may be commanded by ground control to combine into 12 high-powered transponders with 220-watt amplifiers for the purpose of broadcasting Direct-to-Home digital TV services.

ABS-3's C-band covers East, South and Southeast Asia, Western Pacific and Hawaii. The satellite's C-band allows Internet access with downlink capabilities of up to 15 Mbit/s. Moreover, Filipino broadcasters like ABS-CBN use the satellite's C-band capacity for signal distribution and satellite news gathering.
