= TV La Verdad =

- Type: Religious broadcasting, television network
- Country: Brazil
- Owner: Members Church of God International; Miembros Iglesia de Dios Internacional
- Key people: Hermano Eli Soriano; Hermano Daniel Razon
- Launch date: July 2012
- Affiliates: TV Verdade; The Truth Channel
- Official website: http://www.elcaminoantiguo.com

TV La Verdad (English: Truth TV) is a religious broadcast station of the Philippine-based Christian organization, Members Church of God International (MCGI, Spanish: Miembros Iglesia de Dios Internacional) for Spanish-speaking countries in Central and South America.

TV La Verdad's 24 hours a day, 7 days a week broadcast started in July 2012 via Galaxy 19 satellite. Later, it transferred to the SES-6 satellite which covers Central and South America including other countries in North America, Europe and North Africa.

Its broadcast feed originates from a 48-square meter garage, transformed into a makeshift broadcasting studio in Florianópolis, Santa Catarina, Brazil, sharing space with its affiliate stations TV Verdade and The Truth Channel.

The station carries the 24-hour Spanish broadcast of El Camino Antiguo (English: The Old Path, Tagalog: Ang Dating Daan), the longest-running religious program in the Philippines, hosted by international televangelist Hermano Eli Soriano, the Overall Servant of MCGI.

== Satellite Broadcast ==
Satellite	Channel	Band	Position	Frequency	Polarity	SR	Coverage
SES-6	TV La Verdad	C Band FTA	40.5° W	4178 MHz	Left (L)	3200-3/4	South America; North America; Europe; North Africa

== Terrestrial free-to-air broadcast ==
In February 2014, MCGI began its 24/7 free-to-air terrestrial broadcast in El Salvador, the smallest and the most densely populated country in Central America.

Branding	Channel	Country
TV La Verdad	Canal 61	El Salvador
