= Mabuhay Satellite Corporation =

Philippine aerospace corporation

- Company type: Private
- Industry: Aerospace
- Founded: November 10, 1994
- Defunct: January 13, 2012
- Fate: Renamed and shifted to a different industry
- Successor: Mabuhay Investment Corporation (2012)
- Headquarters: Makati, Metro Manila, Philippines
- Key people: Gabriel Z. Pimentel: President, CEO
- Services: Satellite operation and maintenance
- Parent: PLDT (1994-2009); Asia Broadcast Satellite (2009-2012)
- Website: mabuhaysat.com

Mabuhay Satellite Corporation (MSC) was a Filipino aerospace corporation responsible for operating communication satellites and before 2009, the only Philippine company to do so. It was later renamed as Mabuhay Investment Corporation (MIC) and became a holding company owned by PLDT. It once owned the Agila 2 satellite which provides coverage in the Asia-Pacific region. Aside from satellite operation, it also provided satellite-related services. It operated two space centers, namely the Mabuhaysat Subic Space Center, its main hub, and the Mabuhaysat Zamboanga Space Center at Zamboanga City, its back-up hub.

== History ==
Founded on 10 November 1994 bearing the name Mabuhay Philippine Satellite Corporation (MPSC), the company was established primarily to build, own, operate and maintain an international satellite facility and other forms of telecommunications equipment that are capable of providing telecommunications and broadcasting on a domestic and international level. It was formed by a former member of the Philippine Agila Satellite Inc. (PASI) another consortium and later competitor of the MPSC, PLDT which was the largest member of PASI.

The majority of the board of directors agreed, at a meeting held on April 10, 2003, to eliminate the word "Philippines" from the company's name, as the company was set to be the ideal satellite operator internationally, not only within the Philippines.

On November 6, 2009, MSC's communication satellite operation business was sold to Asia Broadcast Satellite (ABS) after they signed an agreement.

On January 13, 2012, after the Securities and Exchange Commission (SEC) approved the amendment on its articles of incorporation, Mabuhay Satellite Corporation was renamed Mabuhay Investment Corporation.

== Satellites ==
=== Agila 2 ===
Launched in 1999, the Agila 2 provides coverage in the Asia-Pacific region. Its control station was located at the MPSC Space Center in the Subic Bay Freeport Zone. The spacecraft was launched by the Long March 3B in its first successful flight and currently orbits at 146°E longitude.
