= Mega Manila =

Megalopolis in the Philippines

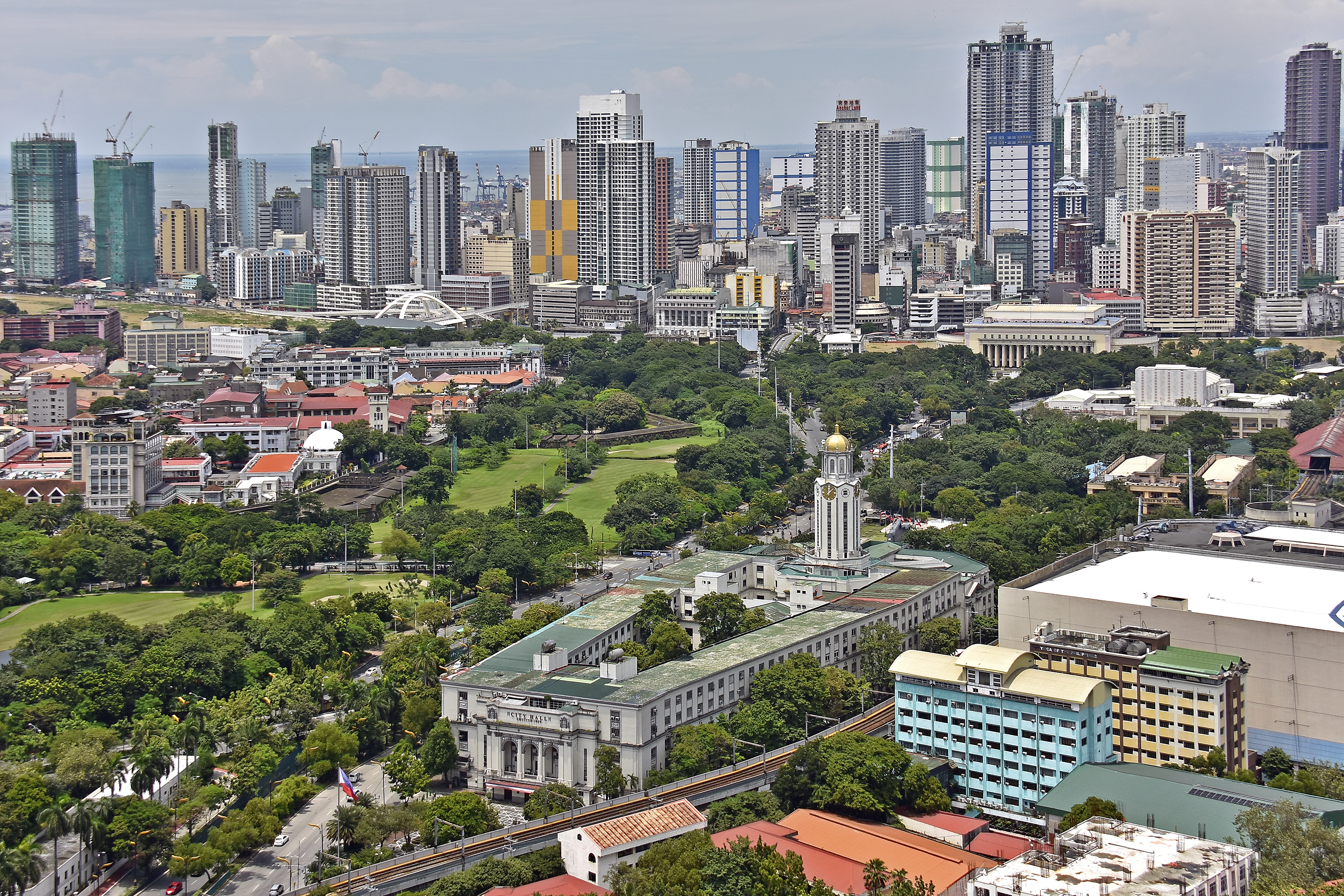
- Manila (proper) skyline

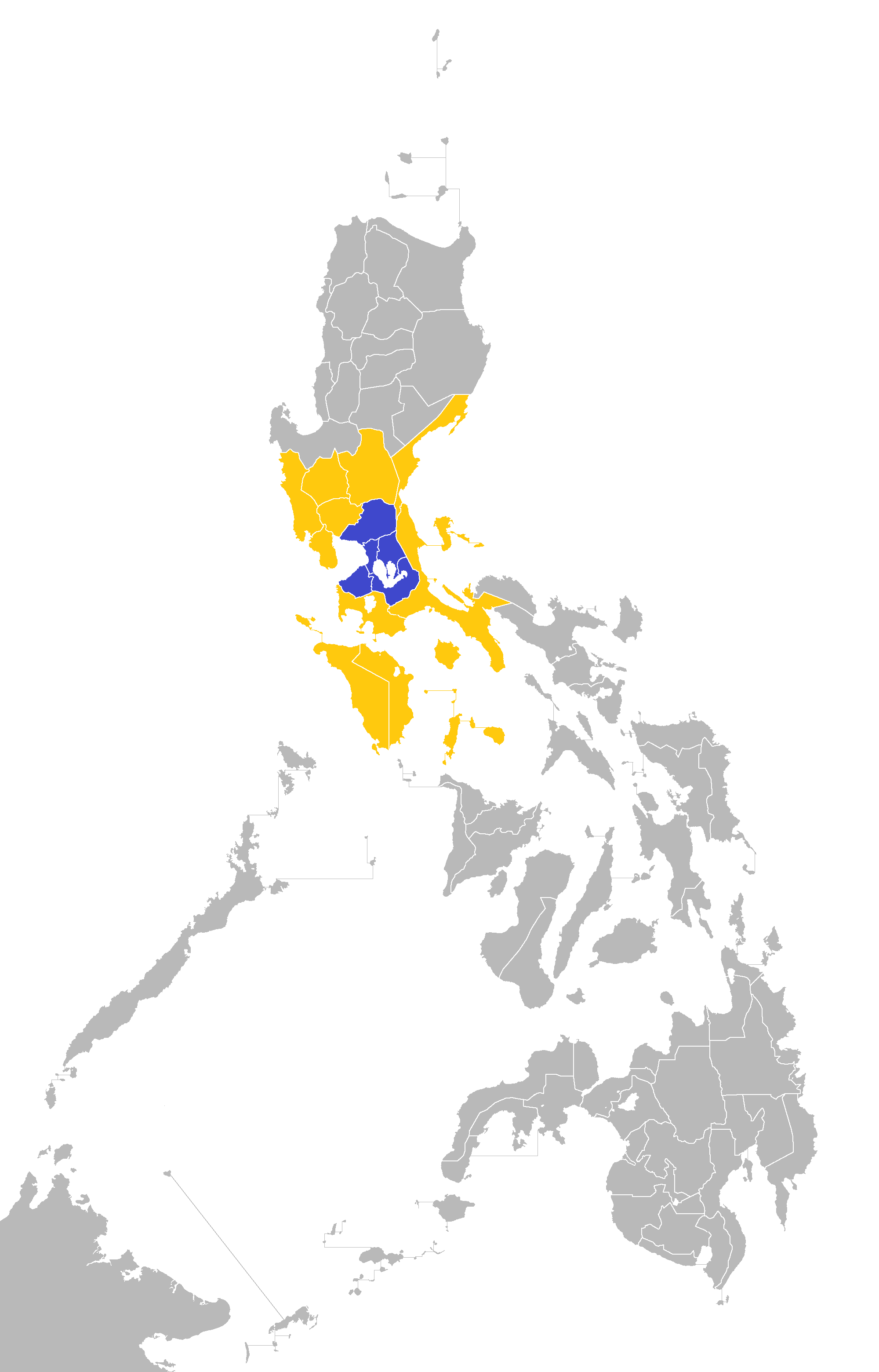
- Location of Mega Manila within the Philippines: blue (for the Greater Manila Area) and yellow, according to the Philippine Information Agency
- Country: Philippines
- Regions: Calabarzon; Central Luzon; Metro Manila; Most parts of Mimaropa

Area
  - Metro: 50,525 km^{2} (19,508 sq mi)

Population
  - Metro: 41,099,507
  - Metro density: 813.45/km^{2} (2,106.8/sq mi)

GDP (Nominal, 2024)
  - Metro: US$260 billion
  - Per capita: US$6,300

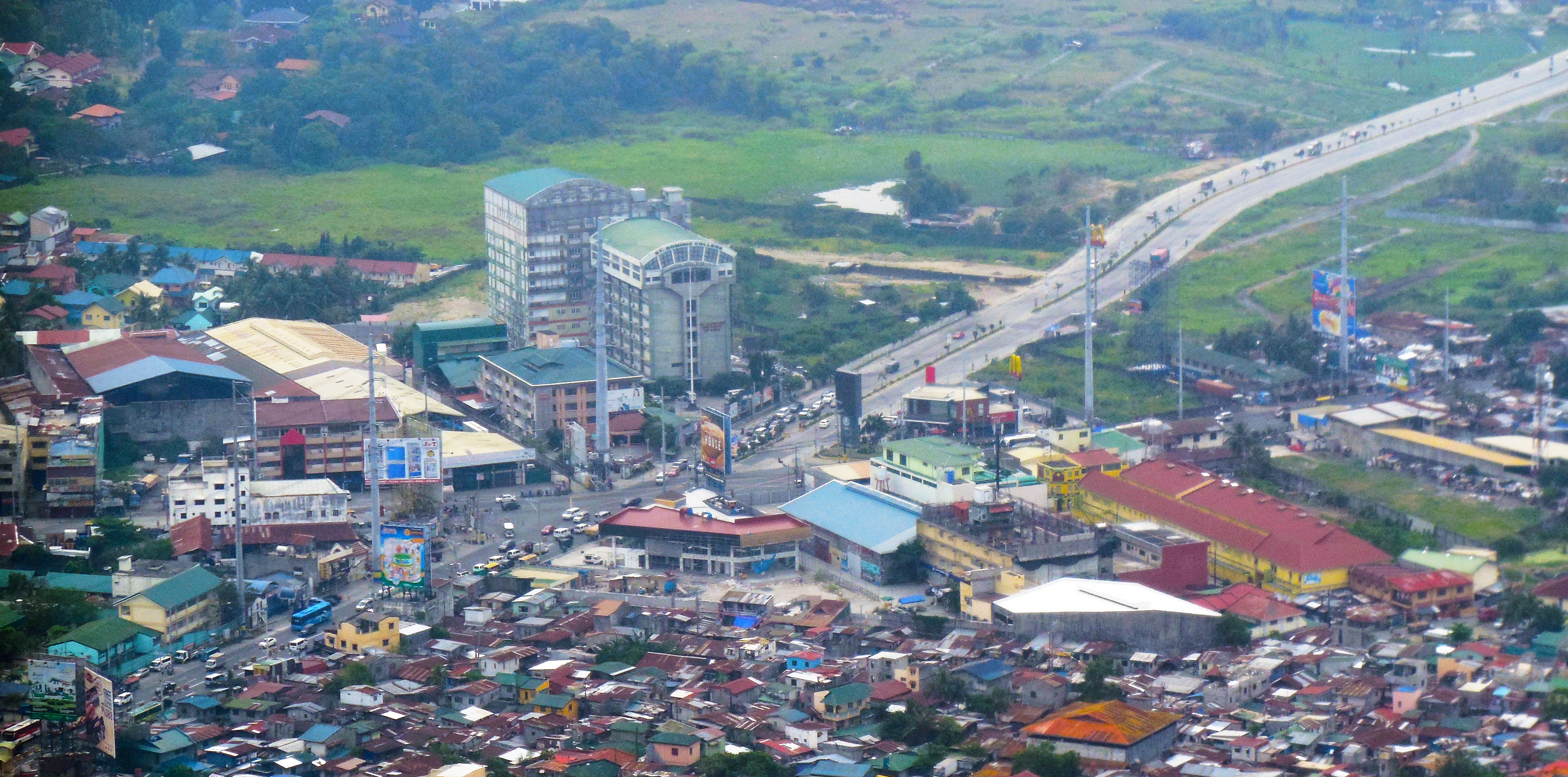
Bacoor downtown area in Cavite

Mega Manila is a megalopolis on the island of Luzon in the Philippines. There are varying definitions of the megalopolis, but it is generally seen as encompassing the administrative regions of Central Luzon, Calabarzon, and Metro Manila. On some occasions, most parts of the administrative region of Mimaropa are also included.

It is frequently used in the press, advertising, television, and radio to refer to provinces bound to Manila, in contrast to the term Greater Manila Area, which is academically used to describe the urbanization process that has long spilled out of Metro Manila's borders, also known as the built-up area. Mapping out the built-up area around Manila requires finer granularity than the more generic term Mega Manila.

It is also being used more and more recently in planning for infrastructure projects by the government, particularly by the National Economic and Development Authority (NEDA) and the Japan International Cooperation Agency (JICA).

Mega Manila is used in general reference to the relationship of Metro Manila to the surrounding provinces. It references only provinces and not the exact settlement patterns of cities, towns, and barangays, which may be urban, suburban, mountainous, or rural areas that are still part of provinces close enough to Manila to be lumped into the definition.

== Definitions ==
=== Philippine Information Agency ===
Mega Manila, as a loose metropolitan area defined by the Philippine Information Agency (PIA), is divided into the National Capital Region (Metro Manila) and the suburbs of Central Luzon, Calabarzon, and Mimaropa.

Mega Manila's 2015 population was projected at 40,368,979 or 40% of the country's population, and covers roughly half of Luzon, with an area of 52,097.66 square kilometers, including many rural areas.

=== National Economic and Development Authority ===
The National Economic and Development Authority (NEDA) defines Mega Manila as Metro Manila and the surrounding specific provinces of Bulacan, Rizal, Cavite, and Laguna, especially on its study "Roadmap for Transport Infrastructure Development for Metro Manila and its Surrounding Areas (Region III and Region IV-A)".

Notably, these collection of areas is also known as the Greater Manila Area. Meanwhile, the NEDA study, which is a collaboration with the Japan International Cooperation Agency (JICA), considers Metro Manila, Central Luzon, and Calabarzon as the Greater Capital Region (GCR).

=== TV rating companies ===
TV ratings agency AGB Nielsen Philippines and Kantar Media Philippines consider Metro Manila and the provinces of Bulacan, Cavite, Laguna and Rizal as "Mega Manila" for their TV ratings gathering (area highlighted in blue on the map), a much stricter definition than the PIA. Using census population in 2010 the area has a population of 25,066,000 or about 26.6% of the population in an area roughly the size of Los Angeles County and average density over 2000 people per square kilometer. As a comparison, only the cities of Tokyo, Jakarta, and Mexico City have reached 25 million people, Shanghai may have but there is not enough detail in suburban statistics on it. Both Mega Manila definitions only include entire provinces, without finer detail.

This Nielsen defined area has a higher ownership of televisions per household anywhere in the country due to its relative economic prosperity as compared to other areas in the country. Radio ratings agency Radio Research Council (provided by KBP) also provide measurement of audience ratings.

The stricter Nielsen definition closer reflects the built-up area surrounding Manila than the PIA definition, Yet even the Nielsen definition of Mega Manila cannot be merely equated to the built-up area; the Nielsen definition includes significant undeveloped forested areas, while completely excluding contiguous developed settlements in such places like northern Batangas. Thus the academic definition as used for urban studies for built-up area surrounding Manila requires yet another term (e.g. Greater Manila Area) to disambiguate from the already used terms Mega Manila and Metro Manila.

Comparison of definitions by source
Source	Term	NCR	Central Luzon							Calabarzon					Mimaropa				
Source	Term	NCR	AUR	BAN	BUL	NUE	PAM	TAR	ZMB	BTG	CAV	LAG	QUE	RIZ	MAD	PLW	ROM	MDC	MDR
Mega Manila
PIA	Mega Manila	Yes	Yes	Yes	Yes	Yes	Yes	Yes	Yes	Yes	Yes	Yes	Yes	Yes	Yes	Yes	Yes	Yes	Yes
AGB Nielsen	Mega Manila	Yes			Yes						Yes	Yes		Yes					
Kantar Media	Mega Manila	Yes			Yes						Yes	Yes		Yes					
NEDA, JICA	Mega Manila	Yes			Yes						Yes	Yes		Yes					
Other terms
—	Greater Manila Area	Yes			Yes						Yes	Yes		Yes					
NEDA, JICA	Greater Capital Region	Yes	Yes	Yes	Yes	Yes	Yes	Yes	Yes	Yes	Yes	Yes	Yes	Yes					

== Economy ==
The headquarters of Metrobank at the financial district of Bonifacio Global City.

The megalopolis of Manila accounts for the 56%, or around US$260, of the gross domestic product of the Philippines in 2024, 31.2% of which are contributed by the capital region of Metro Manila alone, while the remaining 24.8% are contributed by the surrounding areas of the capital that make up Mega Manila. Metro Manila, Calabarzon, and Central Luzon are the top three largest administrative regions in terms of contribution to the national domestic product of the Philippines in 2024.

All but one of the 42 Fortune Southeast Asia 500 Philippine corporations are headquartered in Mega Manila, as with many foreign corporations in the country. They are mostly concentrated in the various business districts of Metro Manila, while some are located in the cities of Angeles and Santa Rosa, the former two being part of the nine cities in the Philippines that were ranked by Oxford Economics in the 2026 Global Cities Index where they are ranked 174th and 388th, respectively, out of the 1,000 cities. All seven Philippine corporations listed in Forbes Global 2000, namely the SM Investments, BDO Unibank, Top Frontier Investment Holdings, International Container Terminal Services, Metropolitan Bank & Trust, Ayala Corporation, and Manila Electric, are headquartered in Mega Manila, particularly in Metro Manila.

The top contributing sector in Mega Manila's economy are service, construction, and manufacturing. Services sector, which includes merchandising, information technology, and hospitality, are mostly concentrated in Metro Manila, accounting to 82.9% of the capital region's economy. Construction, meanwhile, are the top contributor of Central Luzon, along with manufacturing, which is the top contributor of both Central Luzon and Calabarzon, the latter being site of manufacturing and high technology facilities of multinational companies such as Intel, Panasonic, Amkor, and Toyota.

The international financial institution of Asian Development Bank is also headquartered in Mandaluyong in Metro Manila.

Region	GDP (billion US$)
Metro Manila	143.8
Calabarzon	65.2
Central Luzon	50.6
Mega Manila	259.6

== Education ==
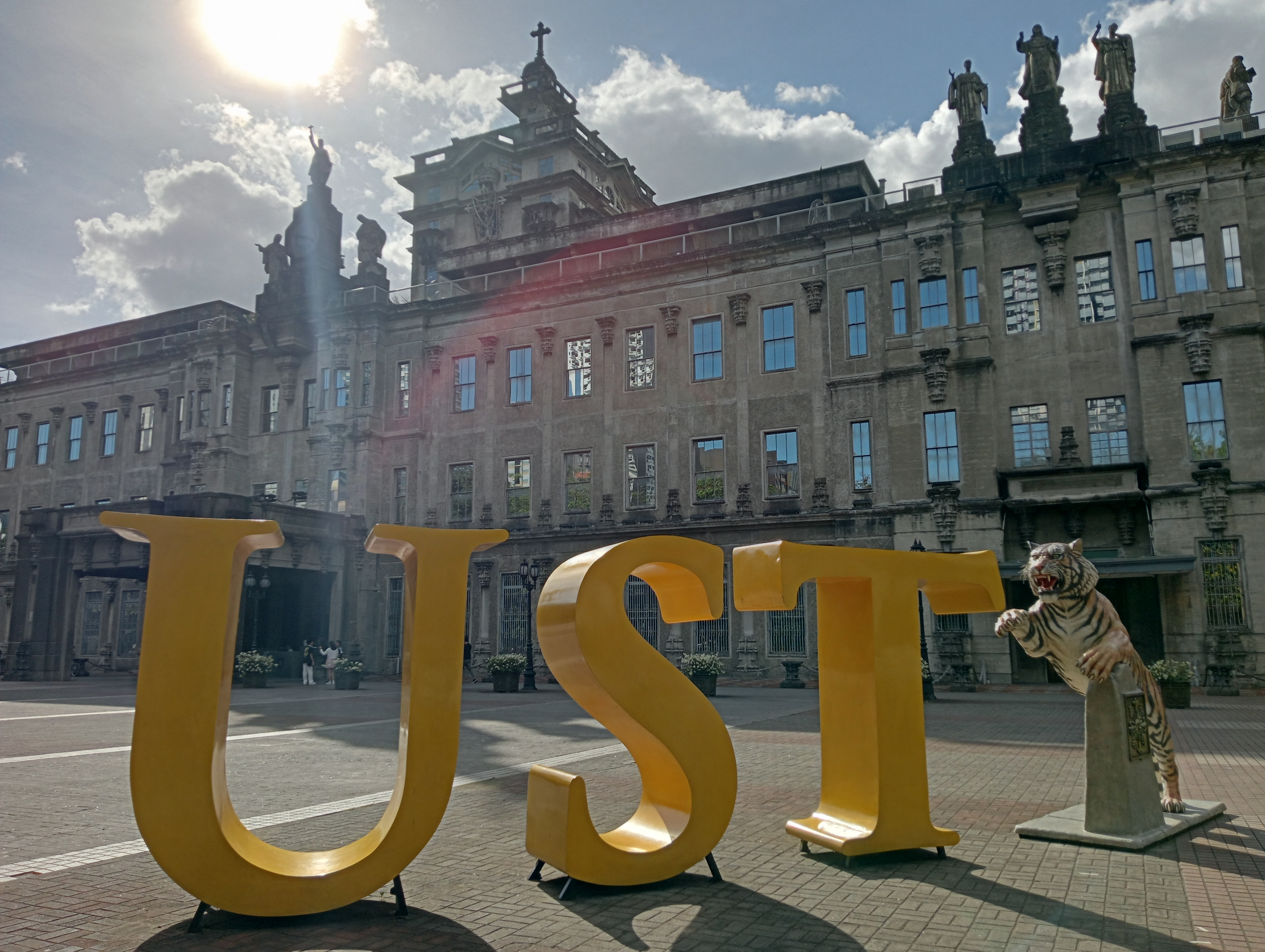
The University of Santo Tomas founded in 1611 in Manila is the oldest existing university in Asia.

The megalopolis of Manila is home to many of the country's top institutions for higher education. Four of the nine constituent universities of the University of the Philippines: Diliman, Manila, Los Baños, and the Open University, are located in Mega Manila. All the schools in the two top collegiate league in the country, the UAAP and NCAA, are located in Mega Manila. These are the Adamson University, Ateneo de Manila University, Far Eastern University, University of the East, University of Santo Tomas, and the University of the Philippines in UAAP, and Arellano University, Colegio de San Juan de Letran, Saint Benilde, Emilio Aguinaldo College, José Rizal University, Lyceum of the Philippines University, Mapúa University, San Beda University, San Sebastian College, and the University of Perpetual Help in NCAA.

Other notable institutions in the megalopolis are the state universities of Central Luzon and Calabarzon such as the Batangas State University, Bulacan State University, Cavite State University, and Central Luzon State University.

== Population ==
The megalopolis of Manila encompasses the county's three most populated administrative regions – Calabarzon at number one, followed by Metro Manila, and Central Luzon at third. The total population of Metro Manila and all the 12 provinces, including their three independent cities, 47 component cities, and 238 municipalities, is 41,099,507 as of 2020. This means 38.6 percent of Philippine's total population all live inside Mega Manila.

Region	Provinces	HUC	Ind. cities	Com. cities	Municipalities	Population (2020)
Metro Manila	—N/a	16	—N/a	—N/a	1	13,484,462
Central Luzon	Aurora	0		0	8	235,750
Central Luzon	Bataan	0		1	11	853,373
Central Luzon	Bulacan	0		3	21	3,708,890
Central Luzon	Nueva Ecija	0		5	27	2,310,134
Central Luzon	Pampanga	1	Angeles City	2	19	2,437,709
Central Luzon	Tarlac	0		1	17	1,503,456
Central Luzon	Zambales	1	Olongapo	0	13	649,615
Calabarzon	Batangas	0		5	29	2,908,494
Calabarzon	Cavite	0		7	16	4,344,829
Calabarzon	Laguna	0		6	24	3,382,193
Calabarzon	Rizal	0		1	13	3,330,143
Calabarzon	Quezon	1	Lucena	0	39	1,950,459
Total	12	19	3	47	238	41,099,507

== Areas under Mega Manila ==
=== Metro Manila ===
Officially called the National Capital Region, it consists the Philippines' capital city Manila, 15 other cities, and one municipality. It is the seat of government of the Philippines. The cities of Metro Manila are the following:

- City of Manila
- Quezon City
- Caloocan
- Las Piñas
- Makati
- Malabon
- Mandaluyong
- Marikina
- Muntinlupa
- Navotas
- Parañaque
- Pasay
- Pasig
- San Juan
- Taguig
- Valenzuela
- Pateros (municipality)

=== Greater Manila Area ===
The continuous region surrounding the Metropolitan Manila area. The provinces and the cities inside Greater Manila Area are the following:

- Metropolitan Manila
  - City of Manila
  - Quezon City
  - Caloocan
  - Las Piñas
  - Makati
  - Malabon
  - Mandaluyong
  - Marikina
  - Muntinlupa
  - Navotas
  - Parañaque
  - Pasay
  - Pasig
  - San Juan
  - Taguig
  - Valenzuela
  - Pateros (municipality)
- Bulacan
  - Baliwag
  - Malolos
  - Meycauayan
  - San Jose del Monte
  - and 20 municipalities
- Cavite
  - Bacoor
  - Carmona
  - Cavite City
  - Dasmariñas
  - General Trias
  - Imus
  - Tagaytay
  - Trece Martires
  - and 15 municipalities
- Laguna
  - Biñan
  - Cabuyao
  - Calamba
  - San Pablo
  - San Pedro
  - Santa Rosa
  - and 24 municipalities
- Rizal
  - Antipolo
  - and 13 municipalities

=== Greater Capital Region ===
A concept used by urban planners to refer to a region consisting the three regions of Metro Manila, Central Luzon, and Calabarzon. It is used by JICA and NEDA as reference in their planning works. The provinces and cities in the Greater Capital Region are the following:

- Metro Manila
  - City of Manila
  - Quezon City
  - Caloocan
  - Las Piñas
  - Makati
  - Malabon
  - Mandaluyong
  - Marikina
  - Muntinlupa
  - Navotas
  - Parañaque
  - Pasay
  - Pasig
  - San Juan
  - Taguig
  - Valenzuela
  - Pateros (municipality)
- Aurora
  - With 8 municipalities
- Bataan
  - Balanga
  - And 11 municipalities
- Bulacan
  - Baliwag
  - Malolos
  - Meycauayan
  - San Jose del Monte
  - and 20 municipalities
- Nueva Ecija
  - Cabanatuan
  - Gapan
  - Muñoz
  - Palayan
  - San Jose
  - and 27 municipalities
- Pampanga
  - Angeles City
  - Mabalacat
  - San Fernando
  - and 19 municipalities
- Tarlac
  - Tarlac City
  - and 17 municipalities
- Zambales
  - Olongapo
  - and 13 municipalities
- Batangas
  - Batangas City
  - Calaca
  - Lipa
  - Santo Tomas
  - Tanauan
  - and 29 municipalities
- Cavite
  - Bacoor
  - Carmona
  - Cavite City
  - Dasmariñas
  - General Trias
  - Imus
  - Tagaytay
  - Trece Martires
  - and 15 municipalities
- Laguna
  - Biñan
  - Cabuyao
  - Calamba
  - San Pablo
  - San Pedro
  - Santa Rosa
  - and 24 municipalities
- Rizal
  - Antipolo
  - and 13 municipalities
- Quezon
  - Lucena
  - Tayabas
  - and 39 municipalities

== See also ==
- Urban Luzon
- Mega Manila
  - Greater Manila Area
    - Metro Manila
