= DYTR =

DYTR is the callsign of Tagbilaran Broadcasting System's stations in Tagbilaran:

- DYTR-AM
- DYTR-FM, branded as 91.1 Balita FM.
