= DYTY =

Radio station in Tacloban, Philippines

Brigada News FM Tacloban (DYTY)
- Tacloban; Philippines
- Broadcast area: Northern Leyte, southern Samar
- Frequency: 93.5 MHz
- Branding: 93.5 Brigada News FM

Programming
- Languages: Waray, Filipino
- Format: Contemporary MOR, News, Talk
- Network: Brigada News FM

Ownership
- Owner: Brigada Mass Media Corporation; (Baycomms Broadcasting Corporation)

History
- First air date: 1993
- Former names: Bay Radio (1993–2010); Dream Radio (2010–2013)
- Call sign meaning: Ernesto Torres Yabut (former owner)

Technical information
- Licensing authority: NTC
- Class: C, D, E
- Power: 5,000 watts
- ERP: 10,000 watts
- Repeater: Ormoc: DYCZ 93.5 MHz

DYTY (93.5 FM), broadcasting as 93.5 Brigada News FM, is a radio station owned and operated by Brigada Mass Media Corporation. The station's studio and transmitter are located at the 3rd Floor, Gosam Bldg., Maharlika Highway, Brgy. Diit, Tacloban.

== History ==
The station was established in 1993 under the Bay Radio network. In 2010, Prime Media Services took over the station's management and rebranded it as Dream Radio. In October 2013, shortly after Baycomms was acquired by Brigada, the station was relaunched as Brigada News FM, with Dream Radio moving to Tagbilaran Broadcasting System-owned 103.1 FM. In 2016, it went off the air due to lack of listeners.

On July 4, 2022, Brigada News FM returned the airwaves as a test broadcast. On July 8, 2023, it was relaunched with its programming and personalities led by former Kaboses Radio anchorman Junel Tomes and former PRTV and FMR 100.7 personality Larry Portillo, who served as its first station manager until his death on July 9, 2023.
