= DYAB =

DYAB may refer to the following radio stations in Visayas, Philippines:

- DYAB-AM, a defunct AM radio station broadcasting in Cebu City, branded as DYAB Radyo Patrol 1512
- DYAB-FM, an FM radio station broadcasting in Tacloban, branded as Dream Radio
- DYAB-TV, a defunct TV station broadcasting in Tacloban, branded as ABS-CBN Tacloban
