= Voice FM Antique =

Philippine radio station

San Jose de Buenavista; Philippines
- Broadcast area: Southern Antique, Western Iloilo
- Frequency: 89.1 MHz
- Branding: 89.1 Voice FM

Programming
- Languages: Karay-a, Filipino
- Format: Contemporary MOR, OPM

Ownership
- Owner: Tagbilaran Broadcasting System

History
- First air date: 2013

Technical information
- Licensing authority: NTC
- Power: 5,000 watts

89.1 Voice FM (89.1 FM) is a radio station owned and operated by Tagbilaran Broadcasting System. Its studio and transmitter are located at Brgy. Badiang, San Jose de Buenavista.
