= Tacloban =

Highly urbanized city in Eastern Visayas, Philippines

- Highly urbanized city
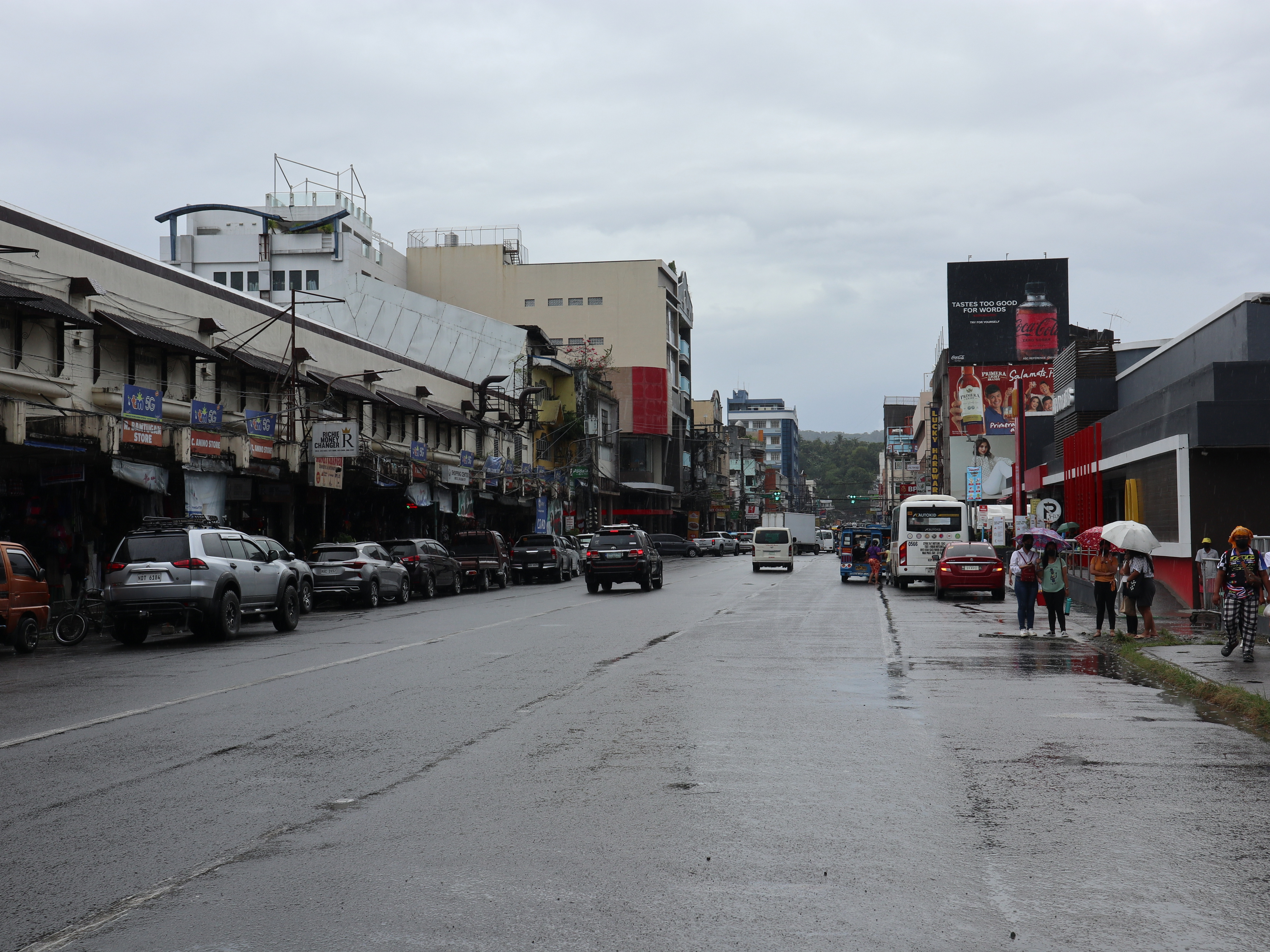
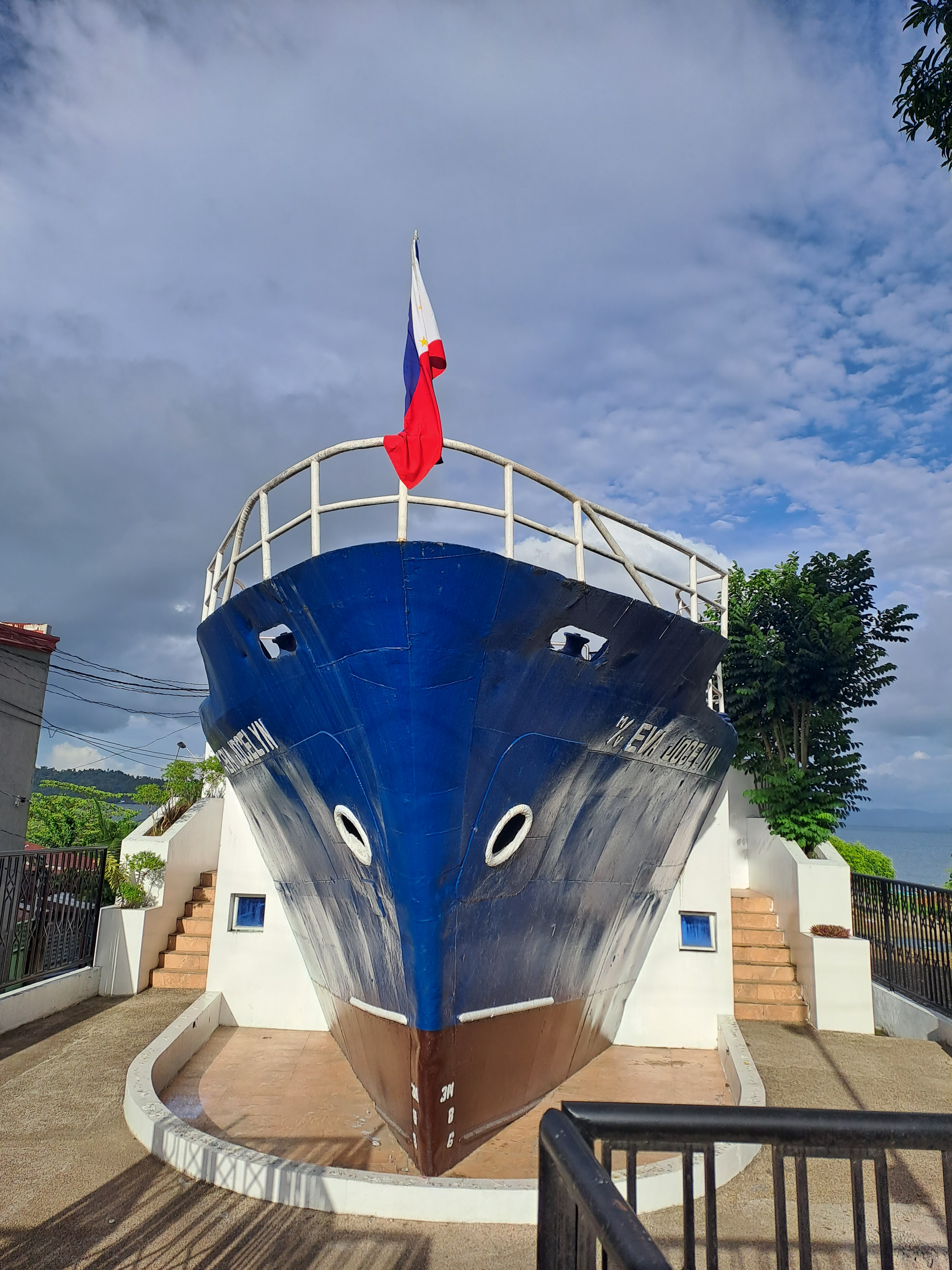
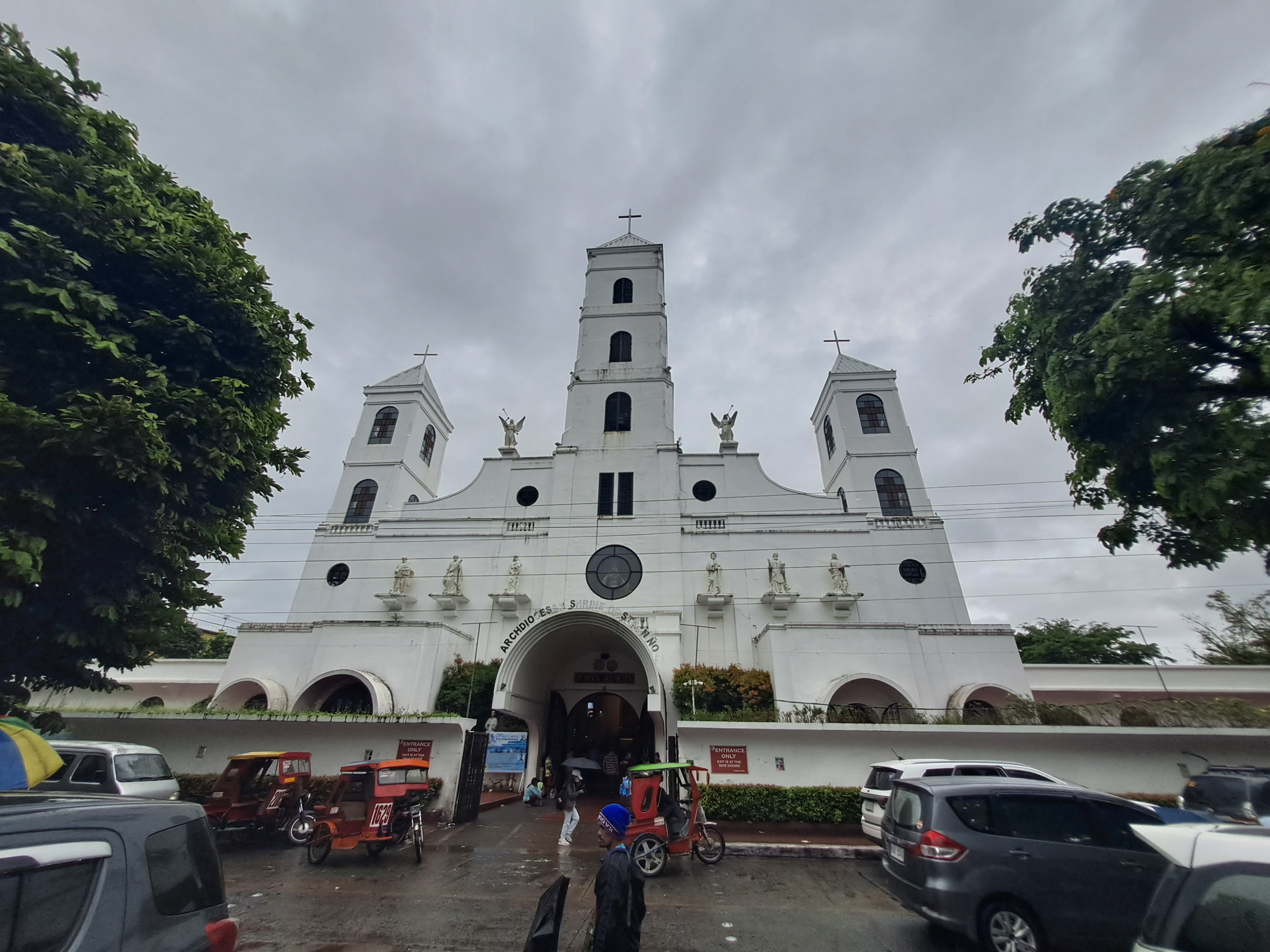
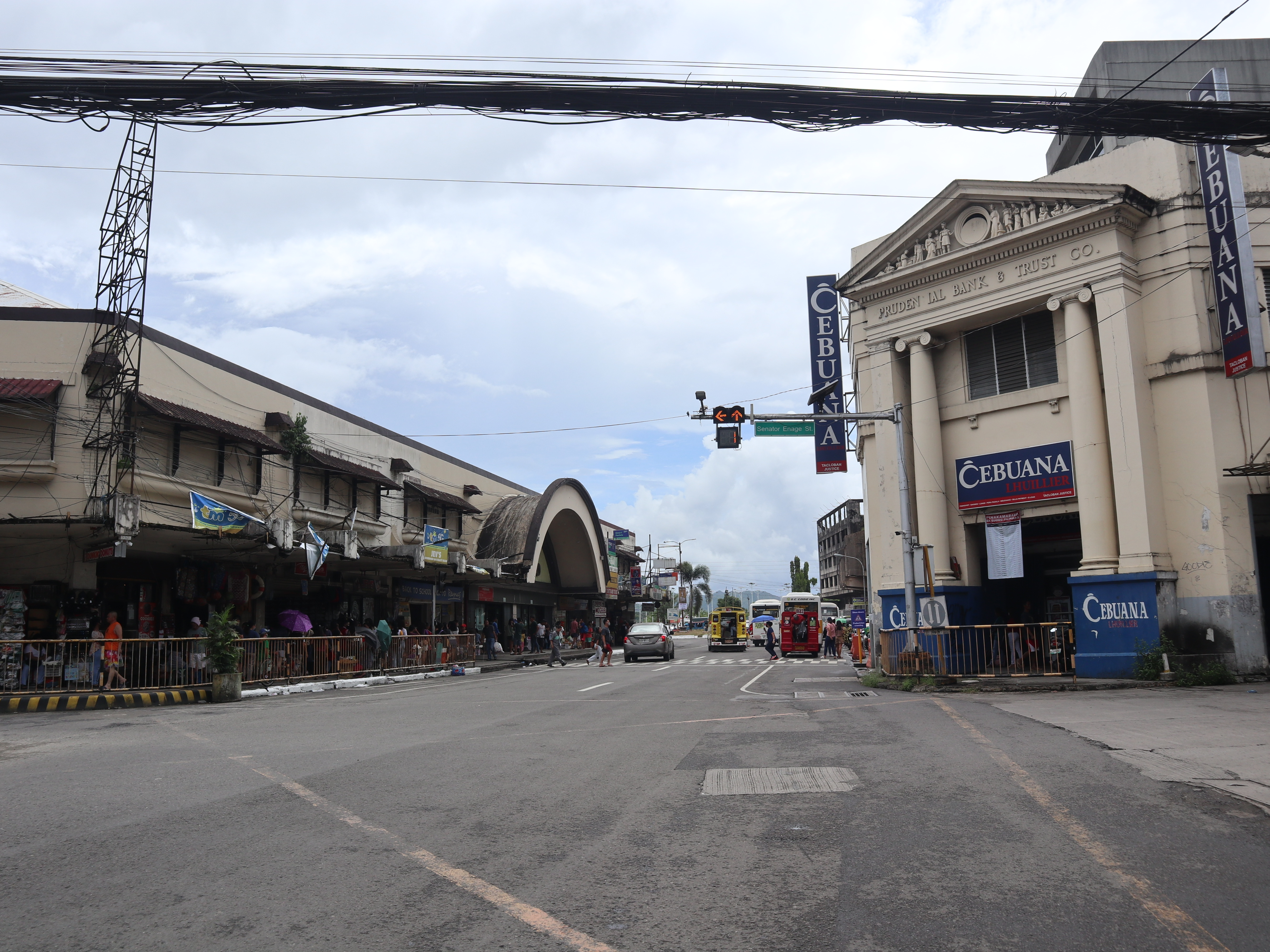
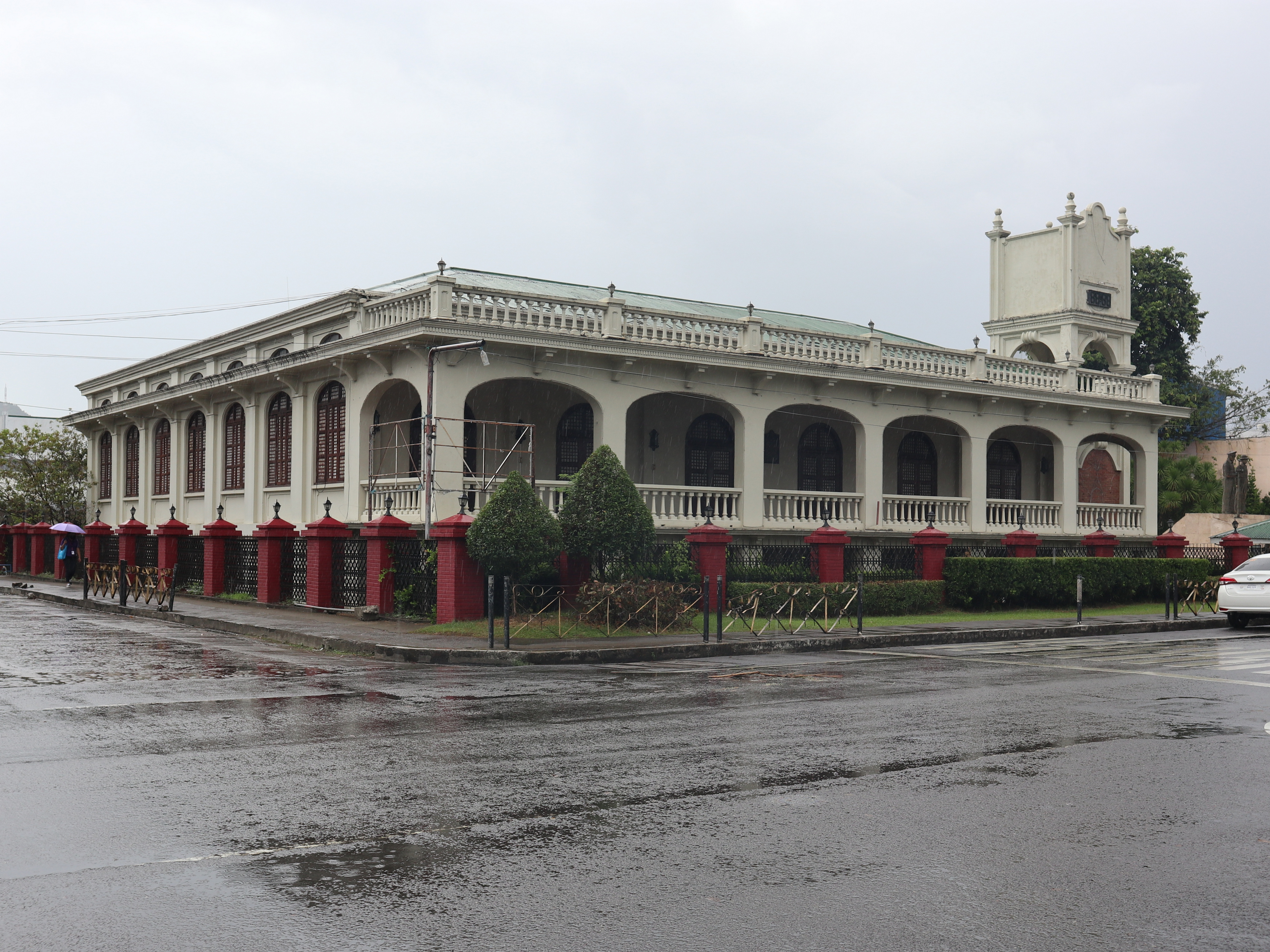
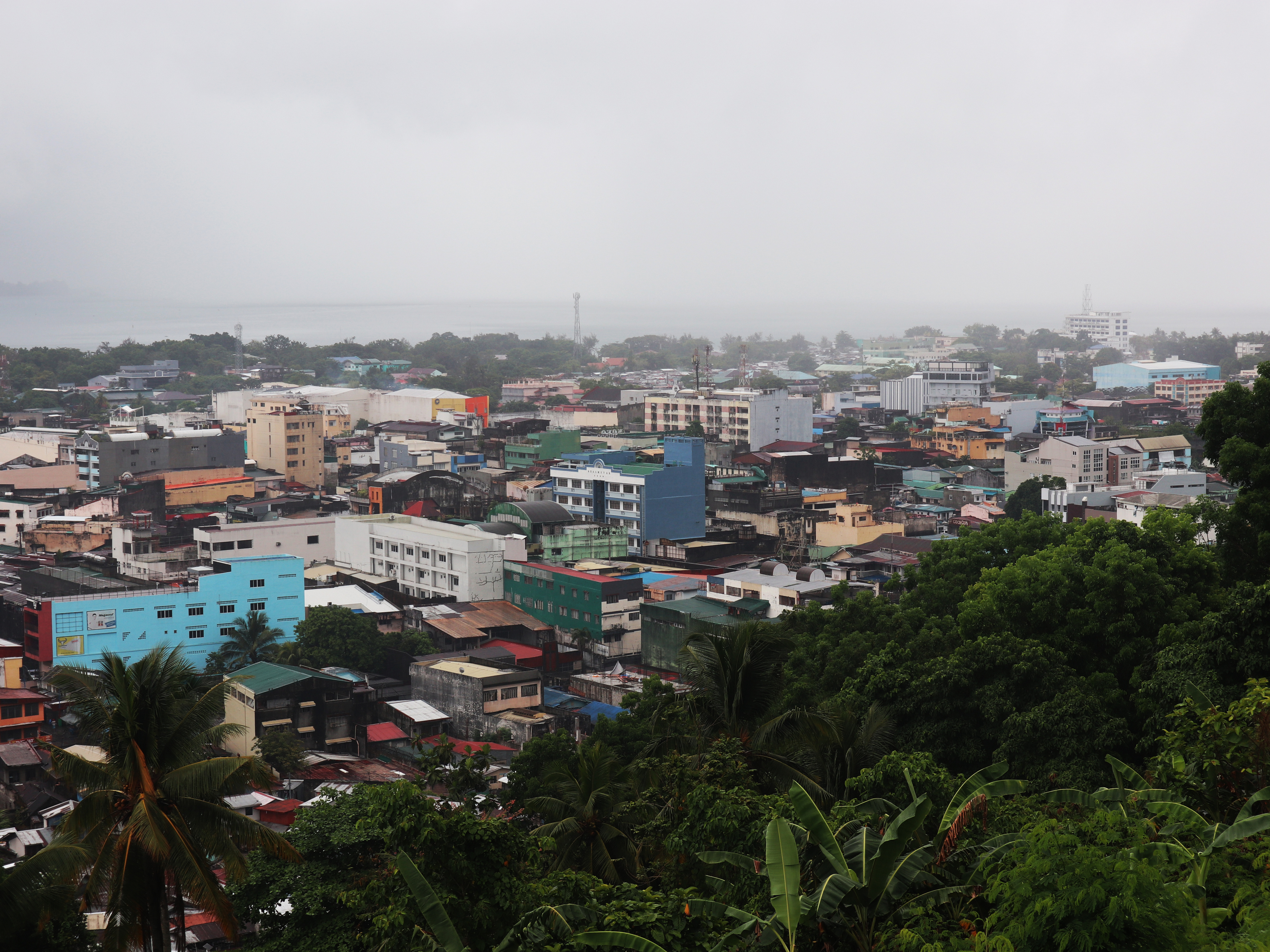
- From top, left to right: Avenida Rizal, Yolanda Shrine, Santo Niño Church, Justice Romualdez Street, Santo Niño Shrine and Heritage Museum, Prince Mansion, and aerial view of Downtown Tacloban

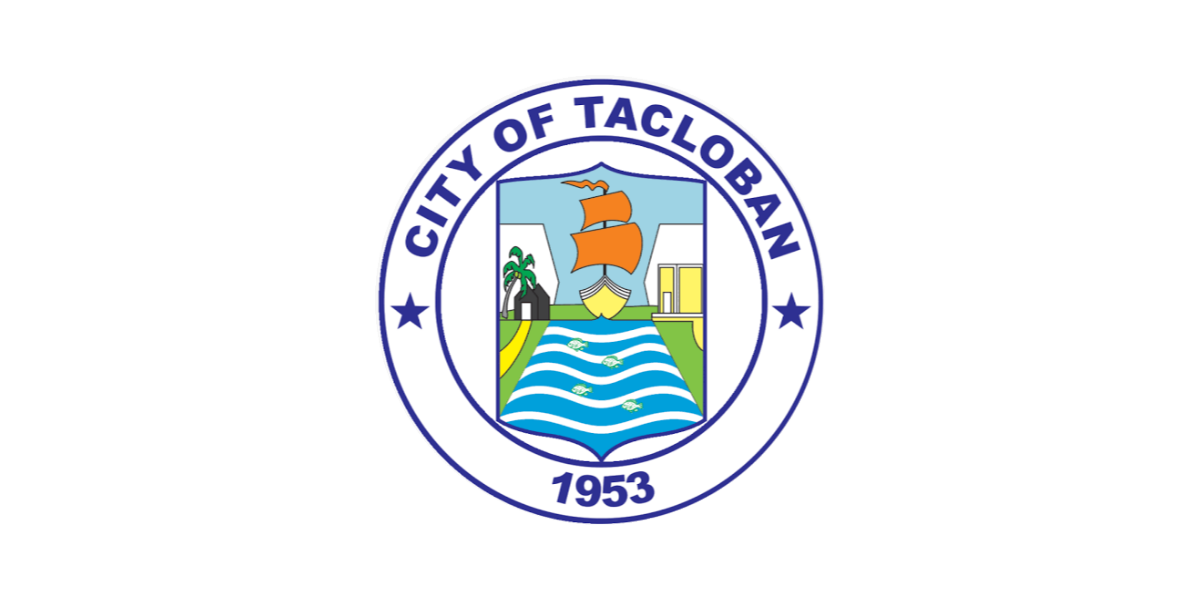
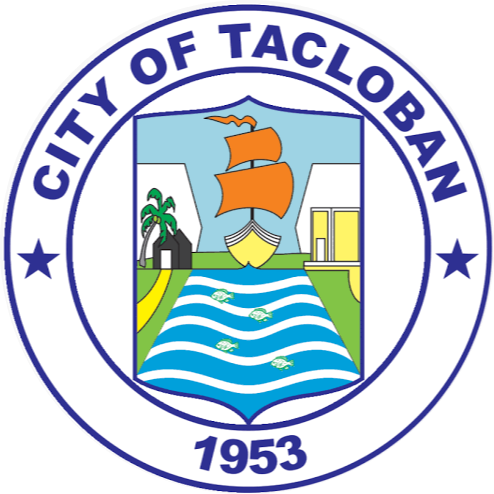
- Flag Seal
- Nicknames: Gateway to Eastern Visayas; Home of the Happiest People in the World
- Motto: City of Love, Beauty and Progresses
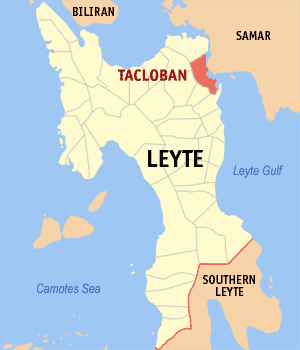
- Map of Eastern Visayas with Tacloban highlighted
- Interactive map of Tacloban
- Location within the Philippines Tacloban (Philippines)
- Coordinates: 11°14′N 125°00′E
- Country: Philippines
- Region: Eastern Visayas
- Province: Leyte (geographically only)
- District: 1st district
- Founded: 1770
- Provincial capital: February 26, 1830
- Cityhood: June 20, 1952
- Highly urbanized city: December 18, 2008
- Barangay: 138 (see Barangays)

Government
  - Type: Sangguniang Panlungsod
  - Mayor: Alfred S. Romualdez (Nacionalista)
  - Vice Mayor: Raymund Vincent A. Romualdez (Lakas)
  - Representative: Ferdinand Martin G. Romualdez (Lakas)
  - City Council: List: • Edmund Edward I. Chua; • Edward Frederick I. Chua; • Jerry S. Uy; • Ferdinand Martin K. Romualdez Jr.; • Eric T. de Veyra; • Dandee M. Grafil; • Christopher Randy L. Esperas; • Brian Steve G. Granados; • Jose Mario S. Bagulaya; • Edson R. Malaki
  - Electorate: 146,293 voters (2025)

Area
  - Highly urbanized city: 201.72 km^{2} (77.88 sq mi)
- Elevation: 40 m (130 ft)
- Highest elevation: 574 m (1,883 ft)
- Lowest elevation: 0 m (0 ft)

Population (2024)
  - Highly urbanized city: 259,353
  - Density: 1,285.7/km^{2} (3,330.0/sq mi)
  - Urban: 285,095
  - Metro: 471,000
  - Households: 57,251
- Demonym: Taclobanon

Economy
  - Income class: 1st city income class
  - Poverty incidence: 15.5% (2023)
  - Revenue: ₱ 1,951 million (2024)
  - Assets: ₱ 5,252 million (2024)
  - Expenditure: ₱ 1,678 million (2024)
  - Liabilities: ₱ 1,502 million (2024)
  - Gross domestic product: ₱45,283 million (2021) $899 million (2021)

Service provider
  - Electricity: Leyte 2 Electric Cooperative (LEYECO 2)
- Time zone: UTC+08:00 (PST)
- ZIP code: 6500
- PSGC: 0831600000
- IDD : area code: +63 (0)53
- Native languages: Waray; Tagalog
- Website: www.tacloban.gov.ph

Tacloban (/tækˈloʊbən/ tak-LOH-ban; Tagalog pronunciation: [tɐkˈloban]), officially the City of Tacloban (Waray: Syudad han Tacloban; Filipino: Lungsod ng Tacloban), is a highly urbanized city in the Eastern Visayas region of the Philippines. According to the 2024 census, it has a population of 259,353, making it the most populous city in Eastern Visayas. The city is located 360 miles (580 km) southeast of Manila.

Tacloban is the regional center of Eastern Visayas and the largest city and capital of Leyte. Although geographically situated within Leyte and grouped with the province by the Philippine Statistics Authority, it is administratively independent.

Tacloban briefly served as the capital of the Philippines under the Commonwealth government from October 20, 1944, to February 27, 1945. In a survey released by the Asian Institute of Management Policy Center in 2010, it ranked fifth among the country's most competitive cities and second among emerging cities. The city was devastated by Typhoon Haiyan on November 8, 2013, having previously suffered similarly destructive typhoons in 1897 and 1912. On January 17, 2015, Pope Francis visited Tacloban during his apostolic visit to the Philippines and celebrated Mass at Barangay San Jose and Daniel Z. Romualdez Airport.

== Etymology ==
The area got its name from the word taklub, a bamboo tray used to catch crabs or shrimp.

== History ==
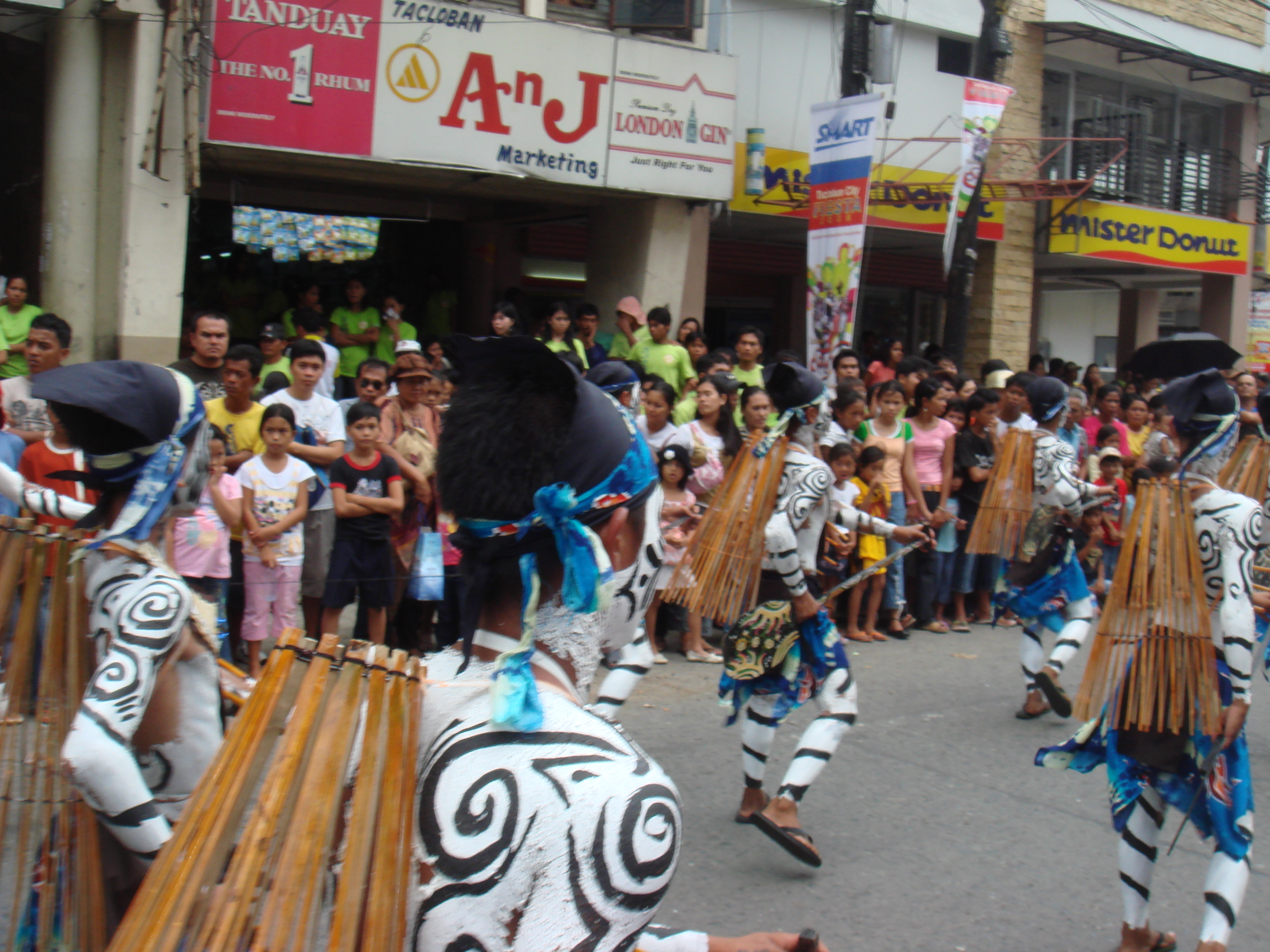
Street performers carrying taklub on their backs (Tacloban takes its name from the taklub, a bamboo fish-catching contraption).

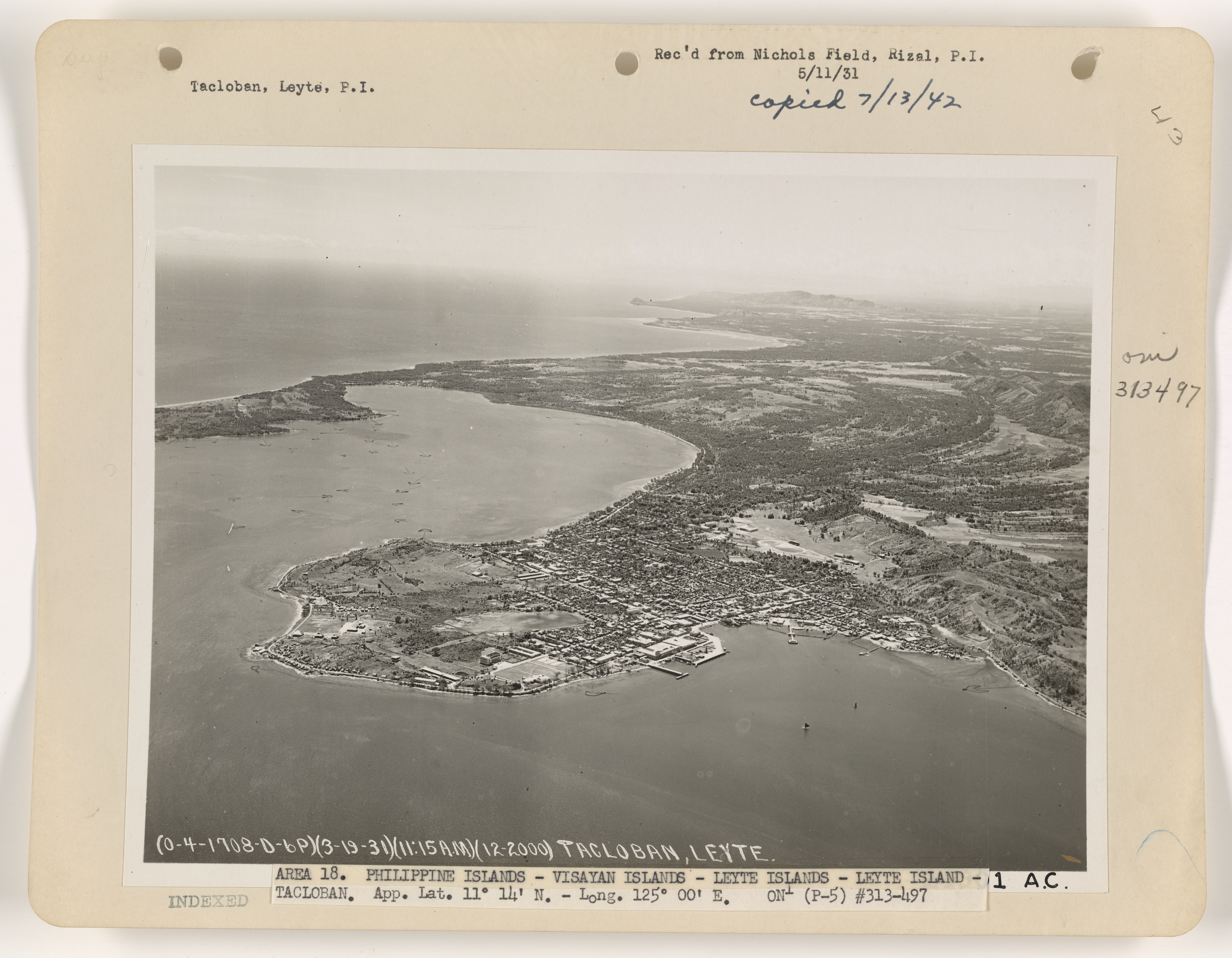
Aerial view of Tacloban, 1931

Originally named Kankabatok, the name change came about in this manner: Kankabatok was a favorite haunt of fishermen. They would use a bamboo contraption called a "taklub" to catch crabs, shrimps or fish.

The 1800s census by Manuel Buzeta recorded 2,290 native families in Tacloban and they co-existed with 11 Spanish-Filipino families.

The capital of Leyte was transferred from one town to another with Tacloban as the last on February 26, 1830. The decision to make Tacloban the capital was based on the following reasons: 1) ideal location of the port and 2) well-sheltered and adequate facilities. On June 20, 1952, Tacloban was proclaimed a chartered city by virtue of Republic Act No. 760.

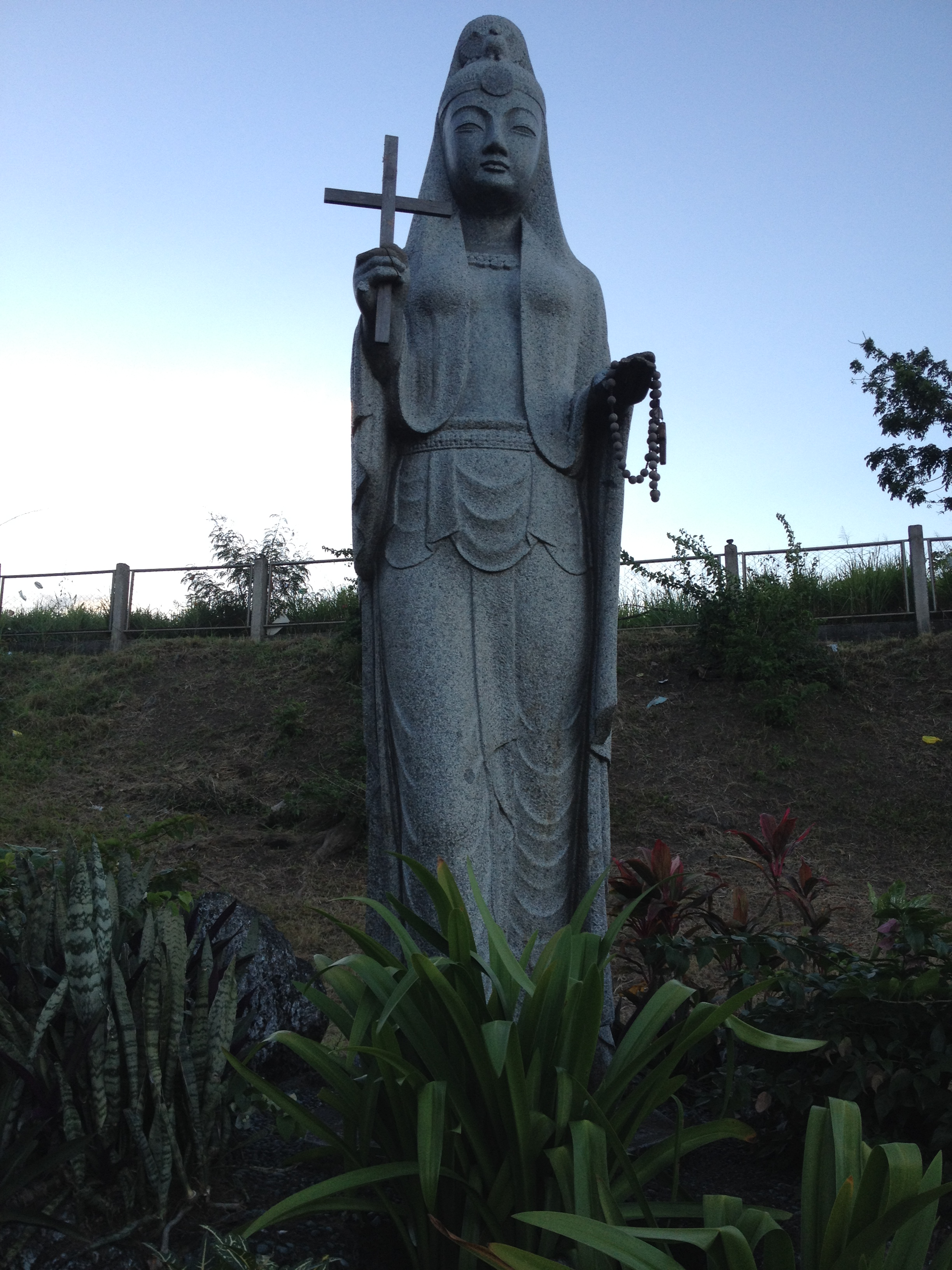
Madonna Maria Kanon, locally called Madonna of Japan, a peace commemoration statue in Kanhuraw Hill

In November 1912, a typhoon swept through the central Philippines and "practically destroyed" Tacloban. In Tacloban and Capiz on the island of Panay, the death toll was 15,000, half the population of those cities at the time.

On May 25, 1942, Japanese forces landed in Tacloban, signalling the beginning of their two-year occupation of Leyte. They fortified the city and improved its airfield. Since San Pedro Bay was ideal for larger vessels, the Japanese Imperial Naval Forces made Tacloban a port of call and entry. This time was considered the darkest in the history of Tacloban and the country due to the incidence of torture among civilians, including the elderly. In response, guerrilla groups operated in Leyte – the most notable of which was the group of Nieves Fernandez. The Japanese established a "comfort station" in the city, where they kidnapped local girls, teenagers and young adults whom they then forced into becoming sex slaves under the gruesome "comfort women" system.

On October 23, 1944, at a ceremony at the Capitol Building in Tacloban, MacArthur, accompanied by President Sergio Osmeña, made Tacloban the temporary seat of the Commonwealth Government and temporary capital of the Philippines until the complete liberation of the country.

The city was proclaimed as a highly urbanized city by President Gloria Macapagal Arroyo on October 4, 2008 and ratified by the people on December 18, 2008. Tacloban was officially declared an HUC at 10:40PM of that day.

=== 2013 Typhoon Haiyan ===
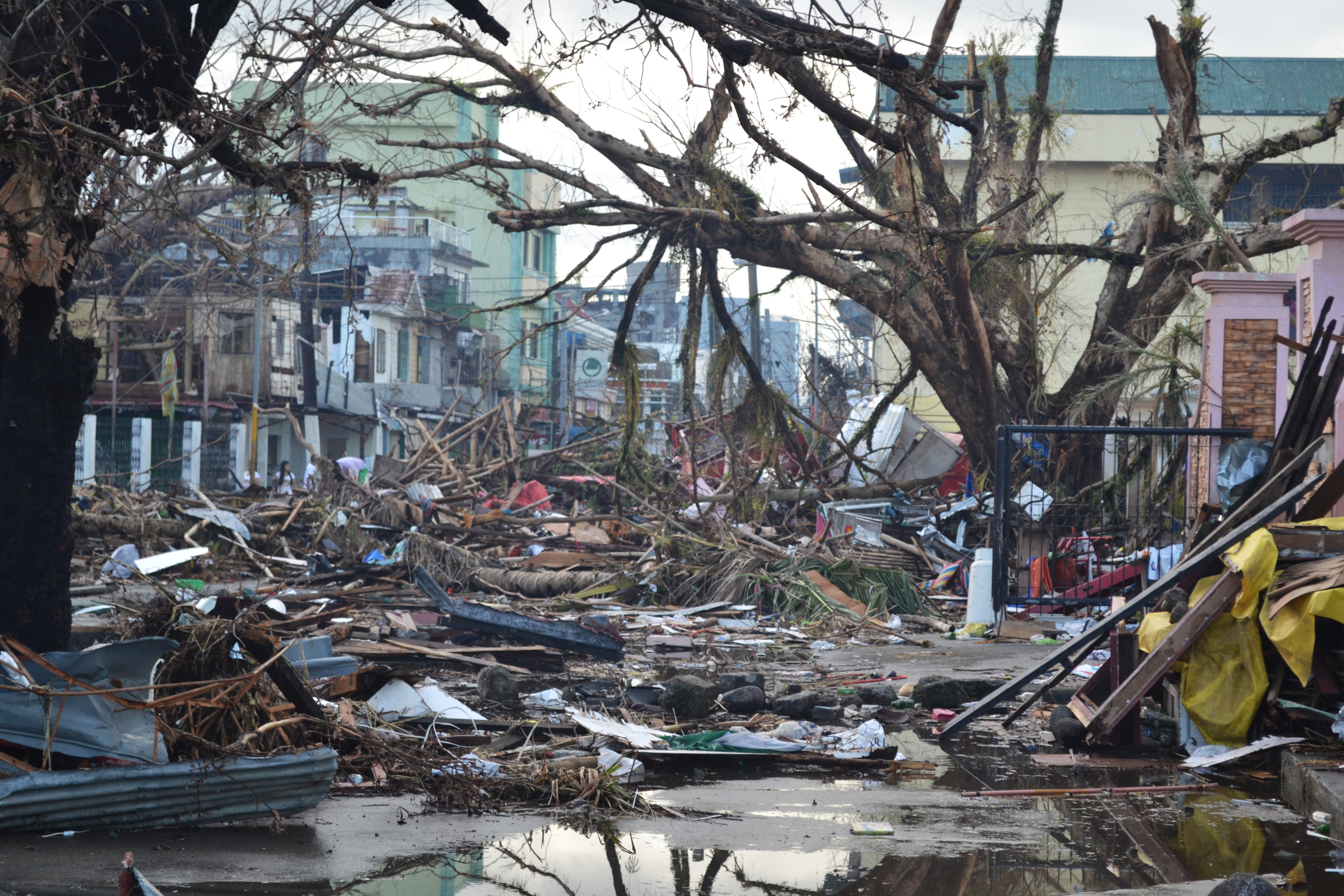
Debris lines the streets of Tacloban after Typhoon Haiyan hit the city.

On November 8, 2013 (PST), Tacloban was hit by the full force of Typhoon Haiyan, causing massive destruction across the city. Dead bodies were scattered on the streets, trees were uprooted, and a 13 ft (4 m) storm surge largely destroyed the airport, though it functioned soon after as a makeshift command and evacuation center. After taking a helicopter flight over the city, US Marine Brigadier General Paul Kennedy was quoted as saying, "I don't believe there is a single structure that is not destroyed or severely damaged in some way – every single building, every single house." Widespread looting and violence is reported to have taken place and local government virtually collapsed, as many city officials were victims. President Aquino declared a state of emergency in Tacloban. The official final death toll stood at 6,201.

=== 2015 Papal visit ===
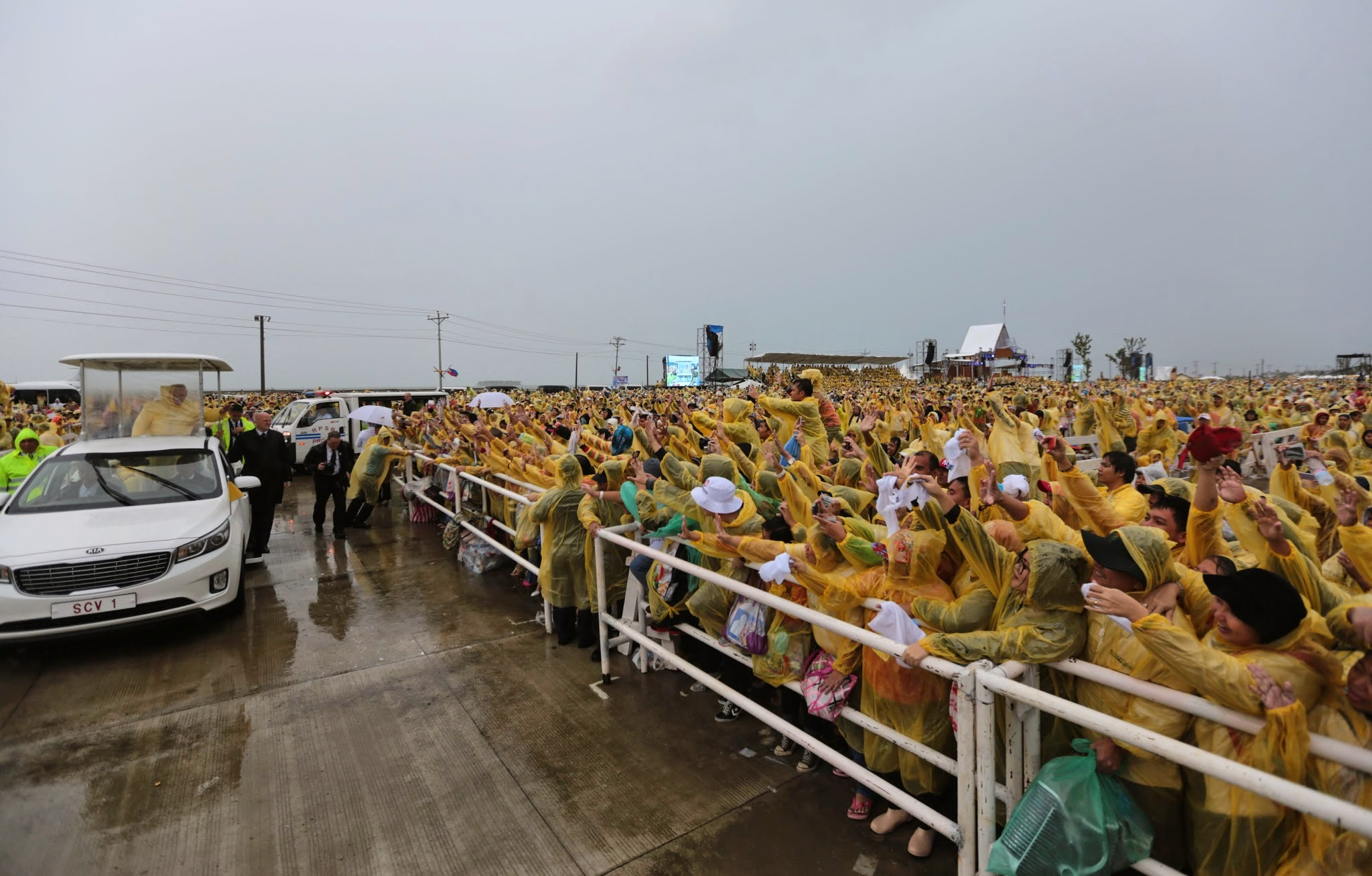
Pope Francis blesses the crowd after the mass near the Tacloban Airport on January 17, 2015, en route to Palo, Leyte to visit families of Typhoon Yolanda victims.

On January 17, 2015, Pope Francis, the leader of the Roman Catholic Church, arrived in Tacloban to celebrate Mass with the survivors of Haiyan (Yolanda). The pope arrived at Daniel Z. Romualdez Airport on a flight operated by Philippine Airlines.

=== 2026 San Jose National High School shooting ===
On June 22, 2026, a school shooting happened in Tacloban City by two juveniles known under the aliases of "Rod" and "Nash".

== Geography ==
Tacloban is located on the northeastern tip of Leyte Island, with its easternmost part facing Cancabato Bay. The bay is at the east mouth of San Juanico Strait. The Tacloban territory follows the length of the strait, along with Babatngon municipality north of the city. The strait divides the islands of Leyte and Samar.

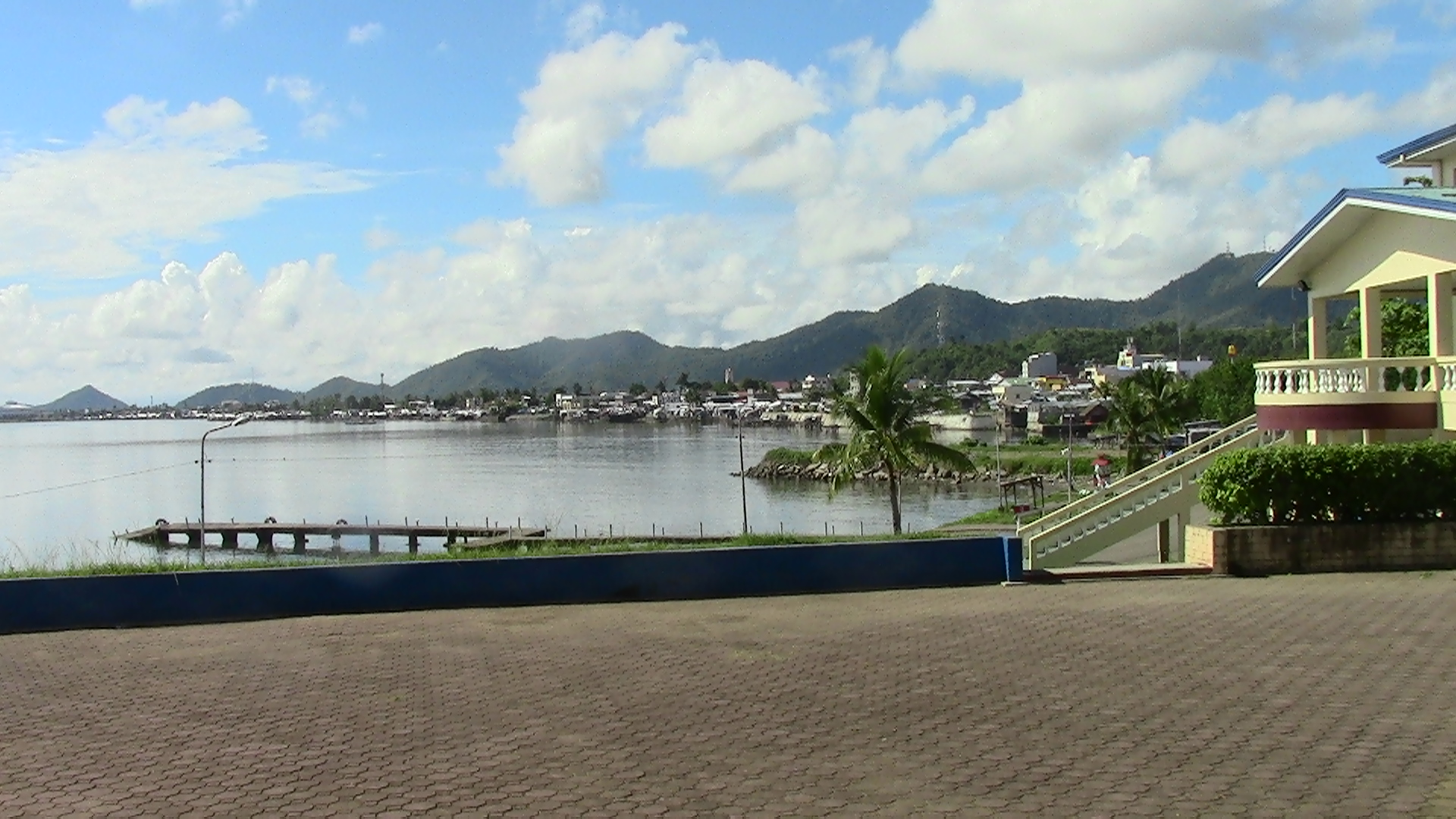
The eastern part of the city facing Cancabato Bay.

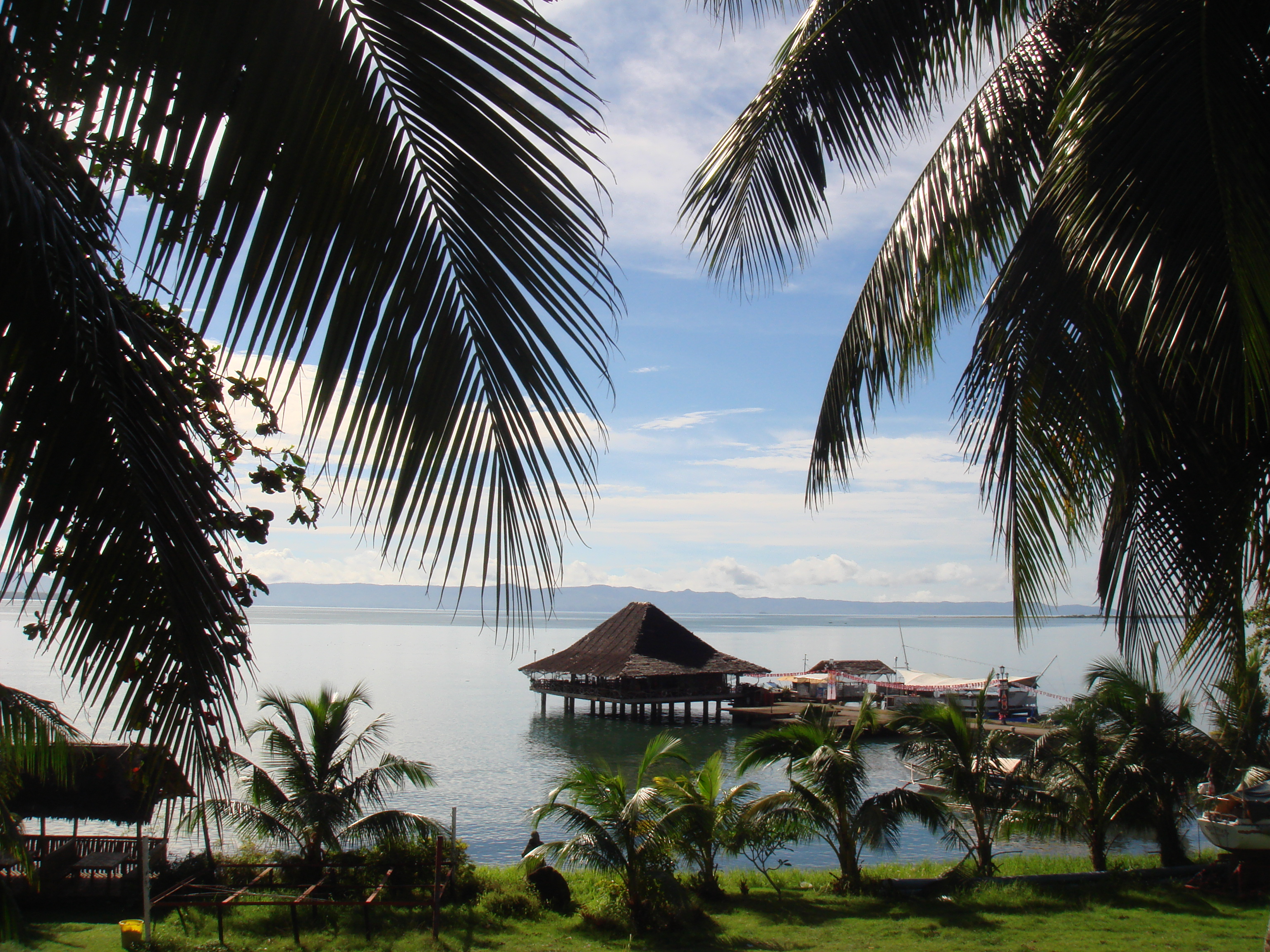
San Pedro Bay shore facing northeastward towards Cancabato Bay and the San Juanico Strait beyond, backgrounded by Samar island on the horizon.

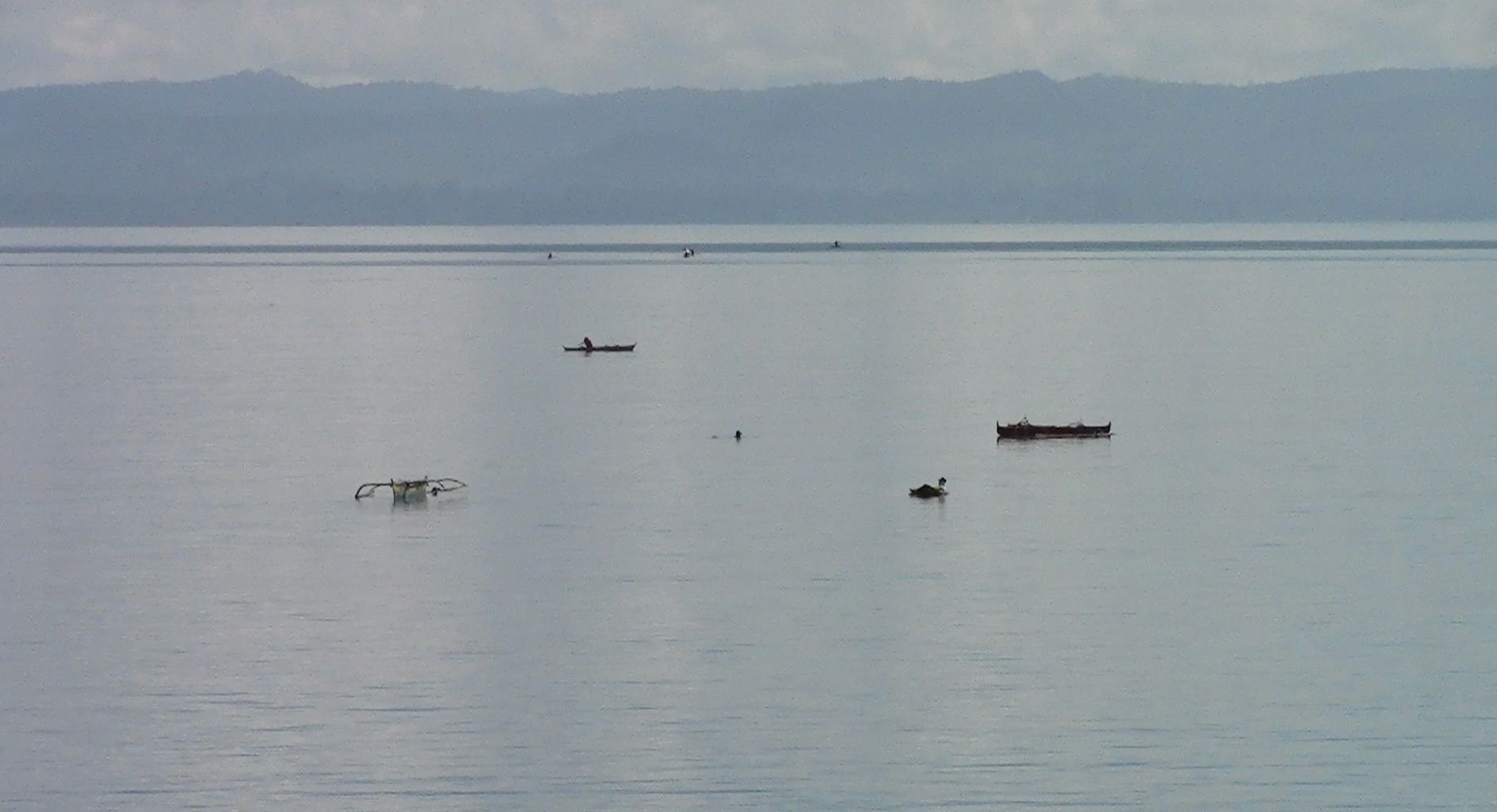
Fishing folks on outrigger canoes on Cancabato Bay, with the San Juanico Strait and Samar island in the background.

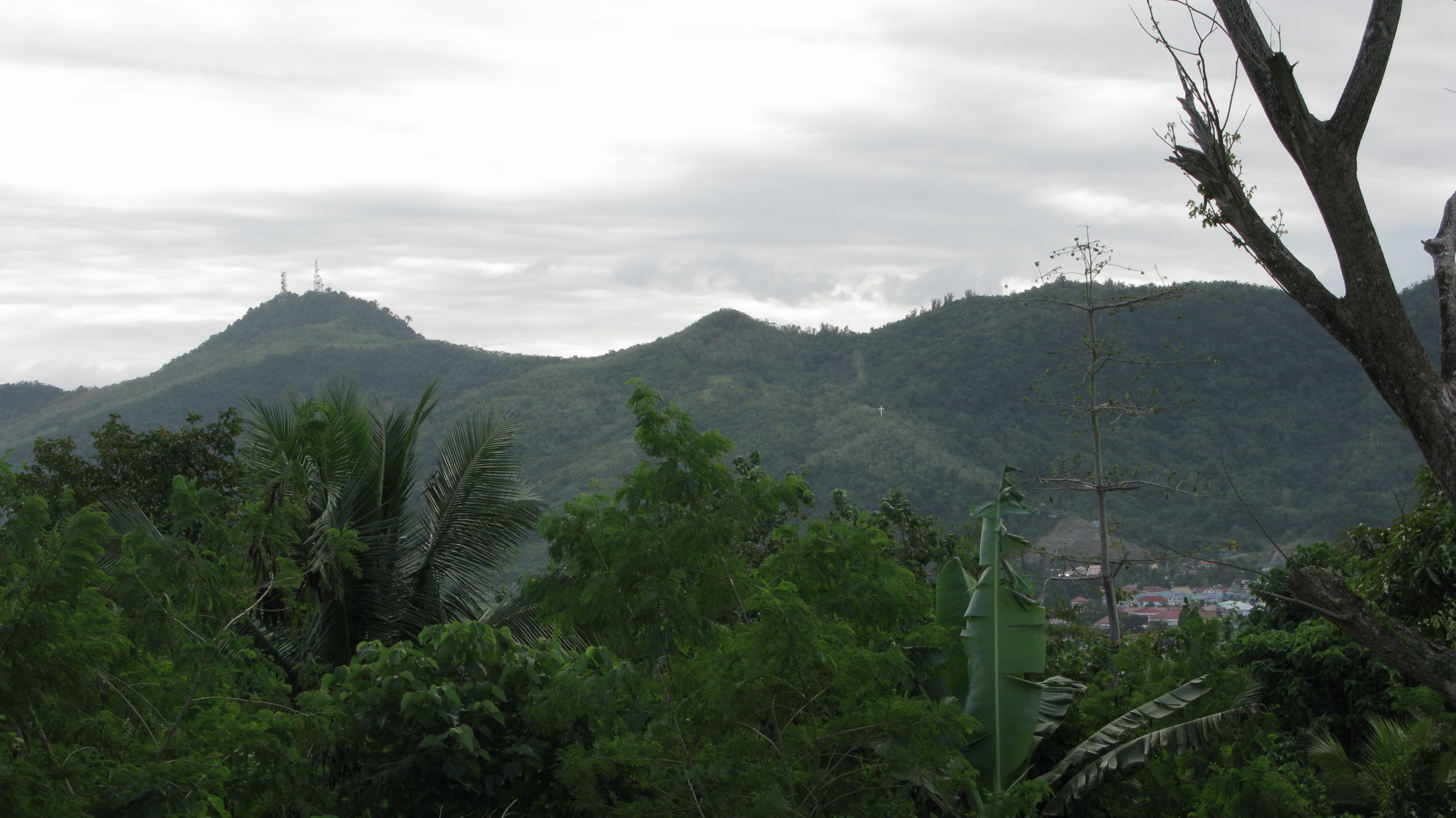
Hills around Tacloban

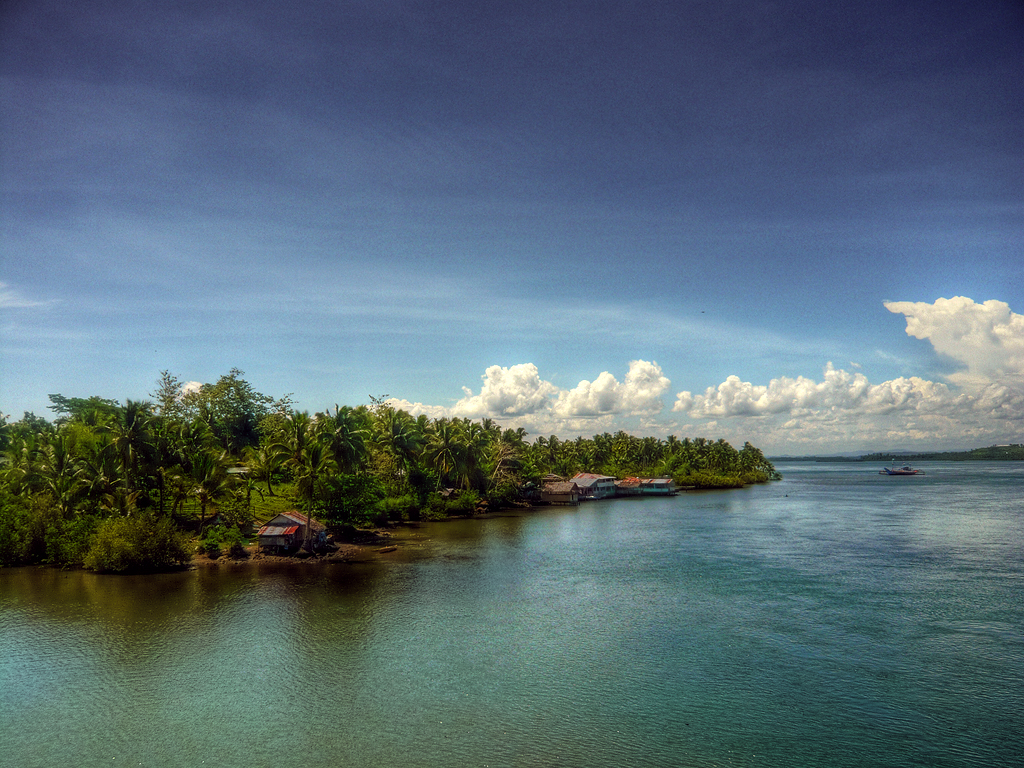
A coastal village in Tacloban

=== Barangays ===
Tacloban is politically subdivided into 138 barangays. Each barangay consists of puroks and some have sitios.

Number	Name
1	Libertad
2	Jones
3	Upper Nulatula
4	Libertad
5	T. Claudio
5-A	T. Claudio
6	
6-A	Sto. Nino
7	
8	T. Claudio
8-A	
12	GE Palanog
13	Salazar/J. Romualdez
14	
15	
16	
17	
18	
19	
20	
21	P. Burgos
22	
23	
23-A	
24	
25	
26	P.Gomez
27	
28	
29	P.Gomez
30 Burgos	
31	
32	
33	
34	Real
35	
35-A	
36	Sabang
36-A	Sabang
37	Sea Wall
37-A	G.E. Palanog Gawad Kalinga Village
38	Calvary Hill
39	Calvary Hill
40	Calvary Hill
41	Calvary Hill
42-A	Quarry
42-B	Quarry
43-A	Quarry
43-B	Quarry
44-A	Quarry
44-B	Quarry
45	
46	Imelda/Juan Luna
47	
48-A	
48-B	
49	Youngfield
50	Youngfield
50-A	Youngfield
50-B	Youngfield
51	
51-A	
52	Lucban Magallanes
53	Magallanes
54	Magallanes
54-A	Magallanes
55	El Reposo
56	El Reposo
56-A	El Reposo
57	Whitelane Sampaguita
58	
59	Sagkahan Picas
59-A	Sampaguita
59-B	Sampaguita
59-E	Sagkahan Picas
60	Sagkahan Aslum
60-A	Sagkahan
61	Sagkahan
62	Sagkahan Saging
62-A	Sagkahan Ilong
62-B	Sagkahan Picas
63	Sagkahan Mangga
64	Sagkahan Bliss
65	Paseo de Legaspi
66	Anibong
66-A	Anibong
67	Anibong
68	Anibong
69	Anibong, Happy Land
70	Anibong, Rawis
71	Naga-naga
72	PHHC Seaside
73	PHHC Mountainside
74	Lower Nula-Tula
75	Fatima Village
76	Fatima Village
77	Fatima Village
78	Marasbaras
79	Marasbaras
80	Marasbaras
81	Marasbaras
82	Marasbaras
83	Paraiso
83-A	Burayan
83-B	San Jose, Cogon
83-C	San Jose
84	San Jose
85	San Jose
86	San Jose
87	San Jose
88	San Jose
89	San Jose, Baybay
90	San Jose
91	Abucay
92	Apitong
93	Bagacay
94	Tigbao
94-A	Basper
95	Caibaan
95-A	Caibaan
96	Calanipawan
97	Cabalawan
98	Camansihay
99	Diit
100	San Roque
101	New Kawayan
102	Kawayan
103	Palanog
103-A	San Paglaum
104	Salvacion
105	Suhi
106	Santo. Niño
107	Santa Elena
108	Tagapuro
109	V&G Subdivision
109-A	V&G Subdivision
110	Utap

=== Climate ===
Tacloban has a tropical rainforest climate (Köppen: Af) but due to the numerous cyclones present in the area, the climate is not equatorial. Tropical rainforest climates are tropical climates in which there is no dry season – all months have mean precipitation values of at least 60 millimetres (2.4 in). Tropical rainforest climates have no pronounced summer or winter; it is typically wet throughout the year and rainfall is both heavy and frequent. One day in an equatorial climate can be very similar to the next, while the change in temperature between day and night may be larger than the average change in temperature between "summer" and "winter".

The average high (daytime) temperature for the year in Tacloban is 31.1 °C (88.0 °F). The warmest month on average is May with an average daytime temperature of 32.3 °C (90.1 °F). The coolest months on average are January and February, with an average (nighttime) temperature of 23.4 °C (74.1 °F).

The highest recorded temperature was 38.0 °C (100.4 °F), recorded on April 6, 1924, and in August. The lowest recorded temperature in Tacloban is 17.5 °C (63.5 °F) which was recorded in December.

The average rainfall for the year is 2,659.3 millimetres (104.7 in), with the most rainfall on average in December with 386.0 millimetres (15.2 in) and the least on average in April with 115.2 millimetres (4.5 in).

Climate data for Tacloban City (1991–2020, extremes 1903–2023)
Month	Jan	Feb	Mar	Apr	May	Jun	Jul	Aug	Sep	Oct	Nov	Dec	Year
Record high °C (°F)	34.7 (94.5)	34.8 (94.6)	35.9 (96.6)	38.0 (100.4)	37.9 (100.2)	36.6 (97.9)	37.8 (100.0)	38.0 (100.4)	37.2 (99.0)	36.0 (96.8)	35.2 (95.4)	35.0 (95.0)	38.0 (100.4)
Mean daily maximum °C (°F)	29.5 (85.1)	30.2 (86.4)	31.0 (87.8)	32.0 (89.6)	32.5 (90.5)	32.1 (89.8)	31.9 (89.4)	32.3 (90.1)	32.1 (89.8)	31.7 (89.1)	31.0 (87.8)	31.1 (88.0)	31.4 (88.5)
Daily mean °C (°F)	26.7 (80.1)	26.9 (80.4)	27.6 (81.7)	28.5 (83.3)	29.0 (84.2)	28.7 (83.7)	28.5 (83.3)	28.8 (83.8)	28.6 (83.5)	28.4 (83.1)	27.9 (82.2)	27.3 (81.1)	28.1 (82.6)
Mean daily minimum °C (°F)	23.8 (74.8)	23.7 (74.7)	24.1 (75.4)	25.0 (77.0)	25.6 (78.1)	25.4 (77.7)	25.1 (77.2)	25.3 (77.5)	25.1 (77.2)	25.1 (77.2)	24.8 (76.6)	24.4 (75.9)	24.8 (76.6)
Record low °C (°F)	18.8 (65.8)	17.6 (63.7)	18.0 (64.4)	20.2 (68.4)	20.5 (68.9)	20.9 (69.6)	21.0 (69.8)	20.6 (69.1)	21.0 (69.8)	19.8 (67.6)	19.4 (66.9)	17.5 (63.5)	17.5 (63.5)
Average rainfall mm (inches)	367.1 (14.45)	278.4 (10.96)	233.3 (9.19)	124.0 (4.88)	143.4 (5.65)	210.8 (8.30)	188.4 (7.42)	156.1 (6.15)	186.1 (7.33)	214.6 (8.45)	288.0 (11.34)	450.4 (17.73)	2,840.6 (111.83)
Average rainy days (≥ 1.0 mm)	18	15	14	12	11	15	15	12	13	16	19	22	182
Average relative humidity (%)	86	84	83	82	83	84	84	83	84	85	87	88	84
Source: PAGASA

== Demographics ==
Population census of Tacloban
Year	Pop.	±% p.a.
1903	11,948	—
1918	15,787	+1.87%
1939	31,233	+3.30%
1948	45,421	+4.25%
1960	53,551	+1.38%
1970	76,531	+3.63%
1975	80,707	+1.07%
1980	102,523	+4.90%
1990	136,891	+2.93%
1995	167,310	+3.83%
2000	178,639	+1.41%
2007	218,144	+2.79%
2010	221,174	+0.50%
2015	242,089	+1.74%
2020	251,881	+0.84%
2024	259,353	+0.70%
Source: Philippine Statistics Authority

According to the 2024 census, Tacloban has a population of 259,353 inhabitants.

Tacloban is predominantly a Waray-speaking city. The language is also officially called Lineyte-Samarnon ("Leyte-Samarnon") and is spoken by more than 90% of the total city population. Waray-Waray, aside from being the native language of the city, is also the lingua franca used in the city among Filipinos of various ethnic groups.

Other Filipino ethnic groups who migrated to the city are the Cebuano/Kana/Visayan speaking populace accounts for 6.08% of the total population, 0.80% are Tagalog, 0.10% are Ilocano, 0.07% are Kapampangan, and 2.95% come from other ethnic origins, including Hiligaynon, Maguindanaon, Maranao and Tausug.

88.52% of the residents of Tacloban City are Roman Catholic; 6.12% are Muslims (most are Maranao migrants from Mindanao); 0.83% are of the indigenous Christian denomination, Iglesia ni Cristo; 0.94% are Evangelicals (born-again Christians); Baptists 0.80%; 0.49% Seventh-Day Adventists. Others comprise 3.10%.

== Economy ==
Downtown Tacloban

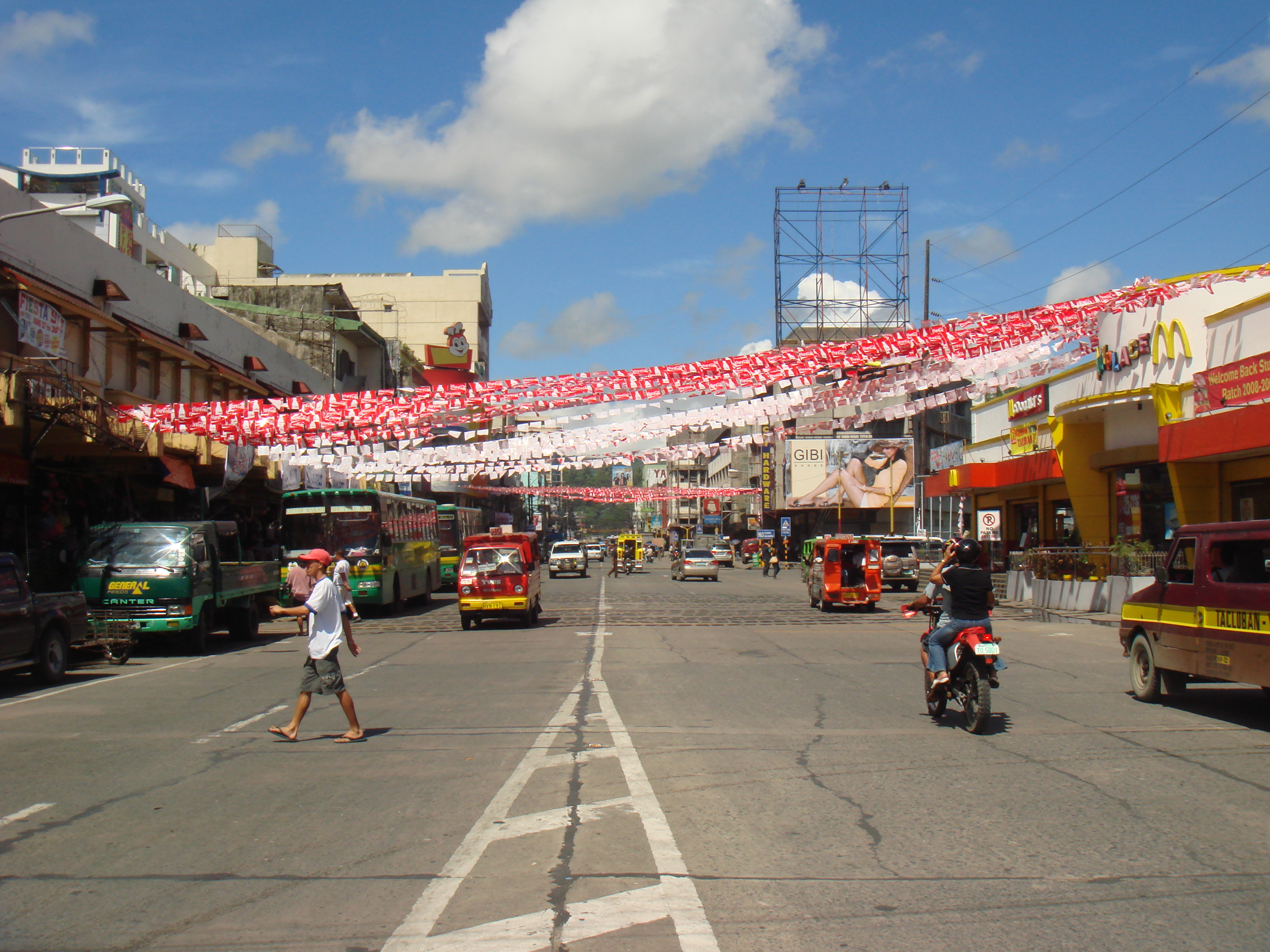
Rizal Avenue

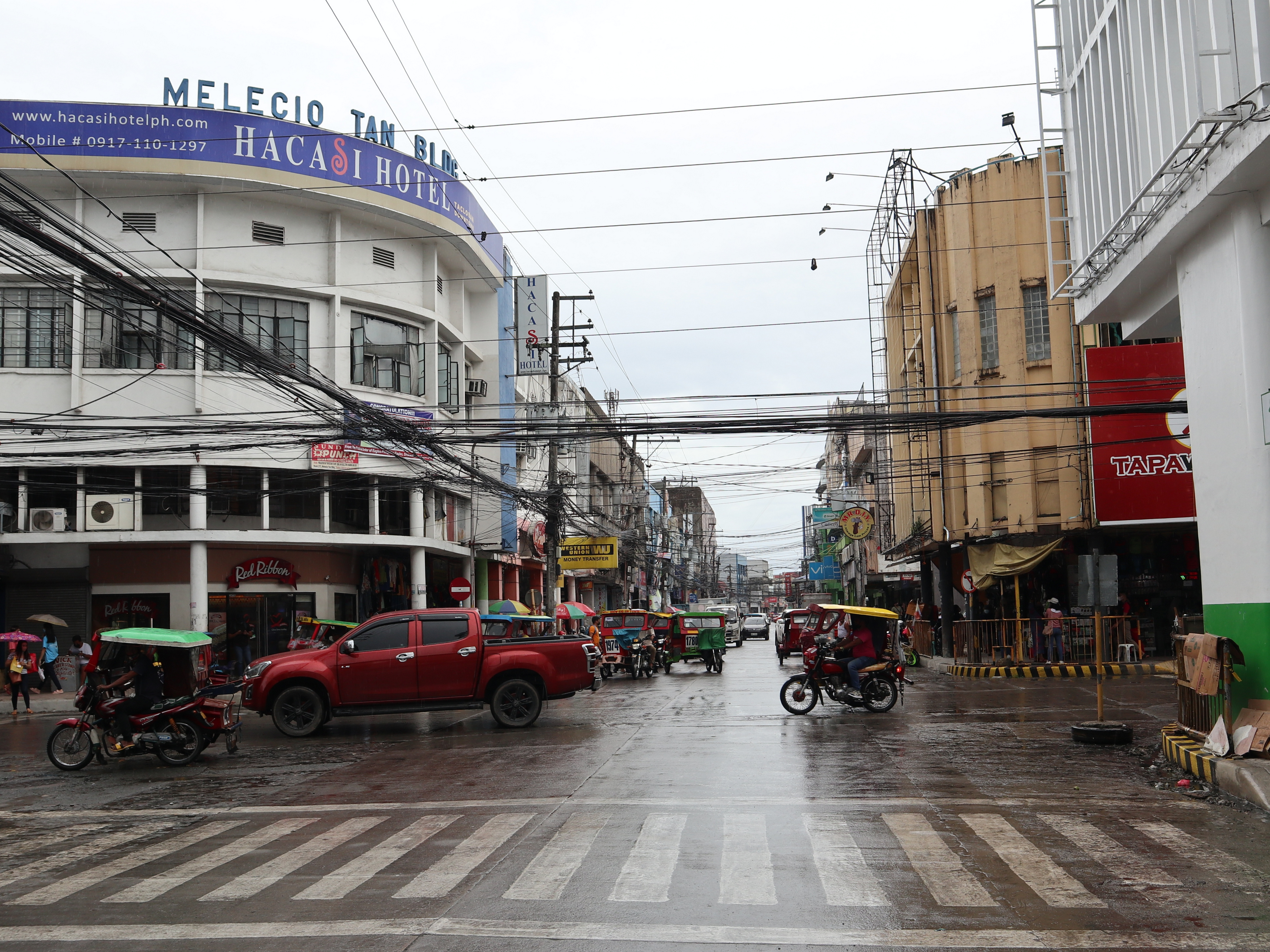
Zamora and Salazar streets intersection

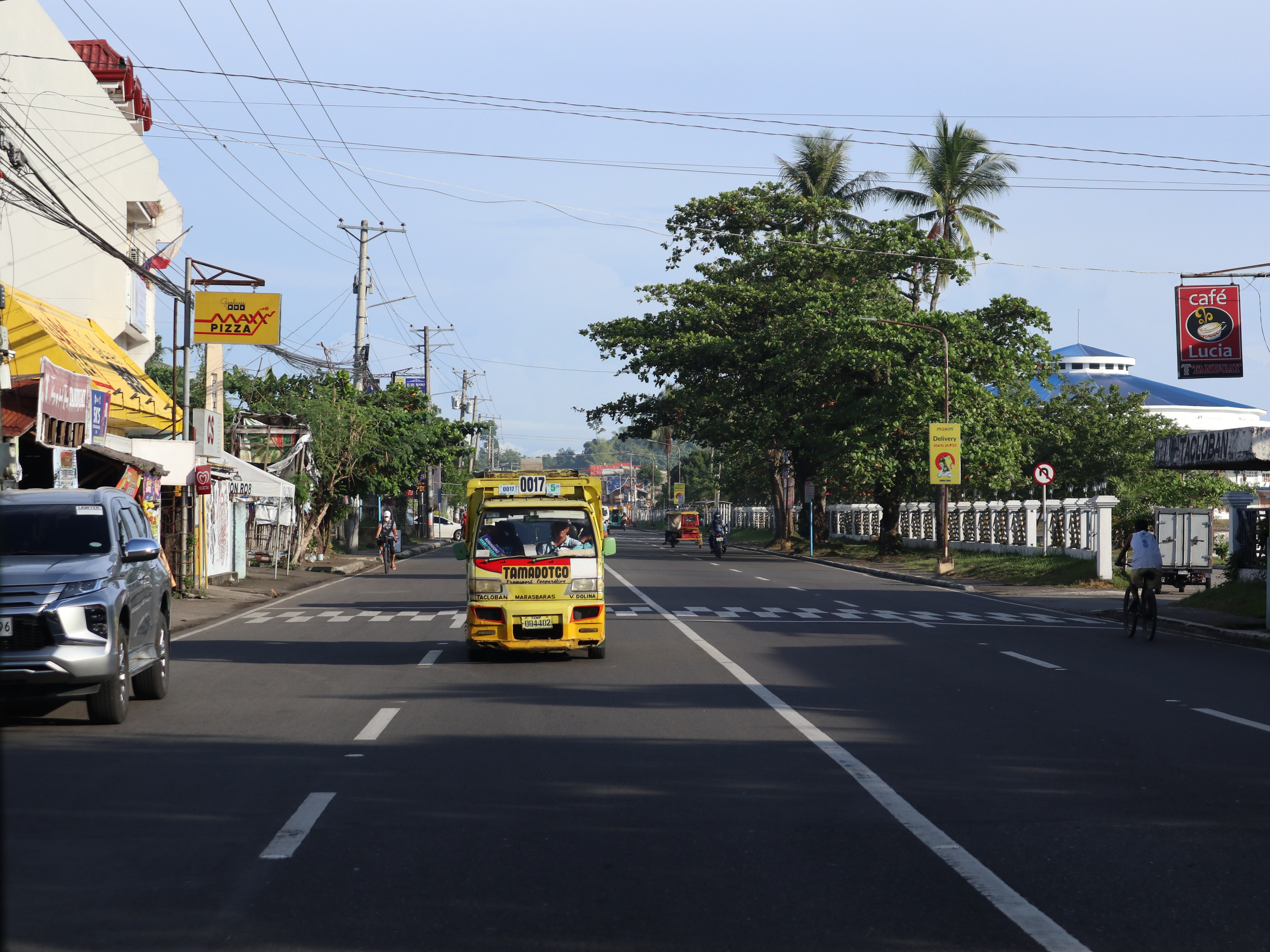
Real Street

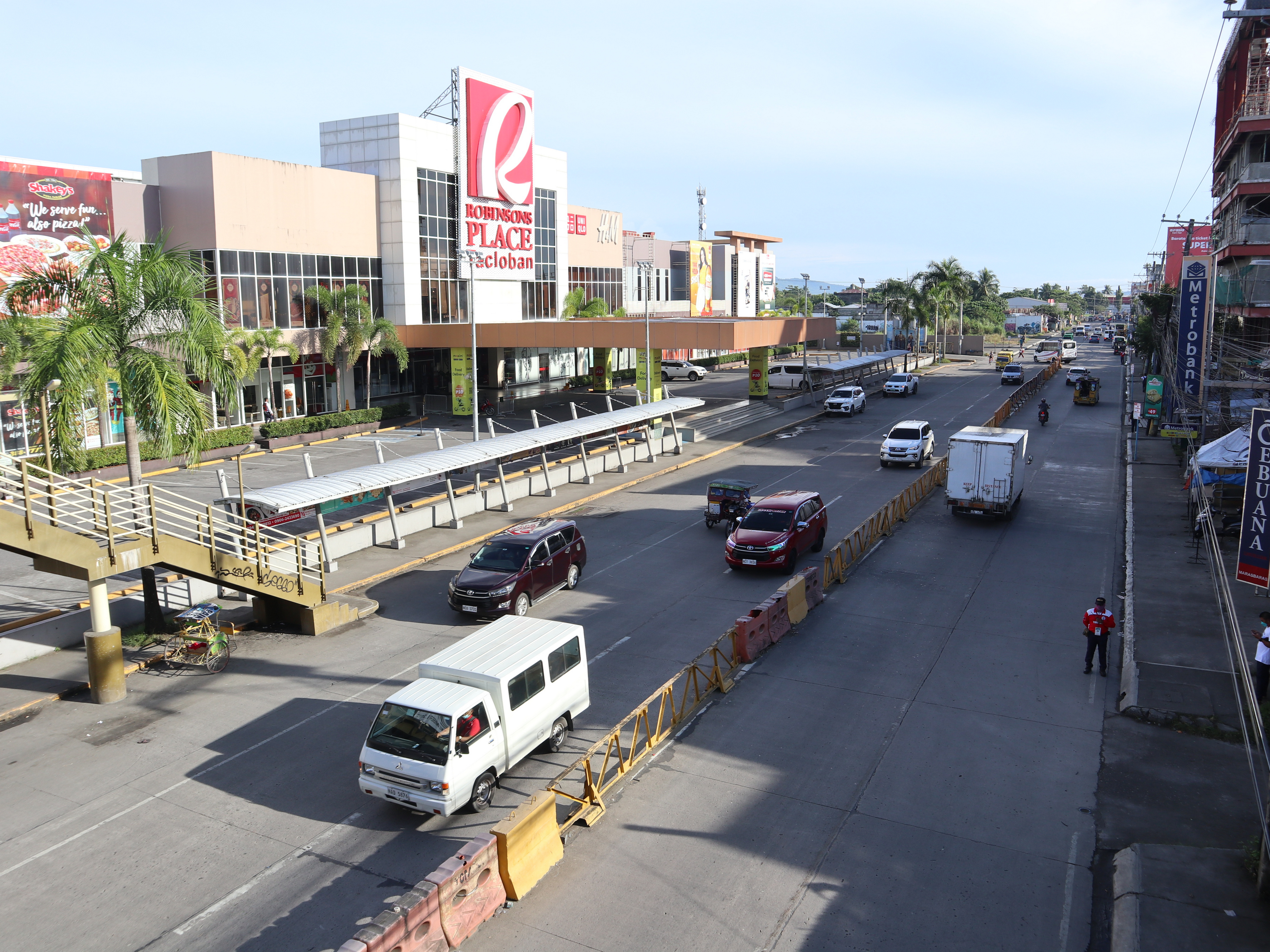
Robinsons Tacloban

Poverty incidence of Tacloban (%)

Source: Philippine Statistics Authority

Tacloban is the economic center of the entire Eastern Visayas, with an economy largely focused on agriculture, commerce, and tourism. Proximal to the city proper is the 237-hectare Eastern Visayas Agri-Industrial Growth Center (EVRGC), which was approved and accredited by the Philippine Economic Zone Authority by virtue of Presidential Proclamation No. 1210 on April 23, 1998. EVRGC serves as an eco-industrial hub with the Tacloban city government as its developer and operator. The Daniel Z. Romualdez Airport also makes the city a key regional transportation hub.

Tacloban is one of the fastest-growing cities in the Philippines, and has one of the lowest poverty incidence rates in the country (at roughly 9%, while the national poverty incidence stands at 30%). After its massive devastation on November 8, 2013, Tacloban was declared by its local government as a start-up city, which meant everything had to start back from scratch. Currently the city is experiencing a rapid economic recovery.

== Government ==
Kanhuraw – this nickname of the Tacloban City Hall is also the name of the hill where the building stands.

The executive power of the City Government is vested in the mayor. The Sangguniang Panlungsod or the city council has the legislative power to create city ordinances. It is a unicameral body composed of ten elected councillors and certain numbers of ex officio and sectoral representatives. It is presided over by the vice mayor, the mayor and the elected city councillors who are elected-at-large every three years. The current city mayor is Alfred Romualdez.

The city government ceased to be under the supervision of the provincial government after it became a highly urbanized city in 2008. The city is now under direct supervision of the national government.

Tacloban City is part of the 1st District of Leyte, alongside seven other municipalities: Alangalang, Babatngon, Palo, San Miguel, Santa Fe, Tanauan, and Tolosa. The district is currently represented by Congressman Martin Romualdez.

=== Official seal ===
Tacloban City Official Seal

The official Seal of Tacloban is the symbol of the city's identity when it became a city under Republic Act No. 760 on June 20, 1952.

The city's emblem stands for the following physical attributes and character:

- Left Portion - Symbolizes the province of Samar (Santa Rita), major supplier of agricultural and marine products to the city, stabilizing its volume of business and trade.
- Center - Stands for the beautiful and scenic San Juanico Strait
- The Galleon - Illustrates the ship of Ferdinand Magellan who landed in the island of Homonhon, Eastern Samar, the first Philippine island he sighted during the historic circumnavigation of the world
- Right Portion - Leyte side, where Tacloban City is located

== Elected Officials ==
2025-2028 Tacloban City Officials
Position	Name	Party
Mayor	Alfred S. Romualdez	Nacionalista
Vice Mayor	Raymund Vincent A. Romualdez	Lakas
Councilors	Edmund Edward I. Chua	Lakas
Councilors	Edward Frederick I. Chua	Lakas
Councilors	Jerry S. Uy	KANP
Councilors	Ferdinand Martin K. Romualdez Jr.	Lakas
Councilors	Eric T. de Veyra	Independent
Councilors	Dandee M. Grafil	Lakas
Councilors	Christopher Randy L. Esperas	Lakas
Councilors	Brian Steve G. Granados	Lakas
Councilors	Jose Mario S. Bagulaya	Liberal
Councilors	Edson R. Malaki	Lakas
Ex Officio City Council Members
ABC President	Raymund A. Balagapo	Nonpartisan
SK Federation President	Emmanuel Dirko S. De Paz	Nonpartisan

== Culture ==
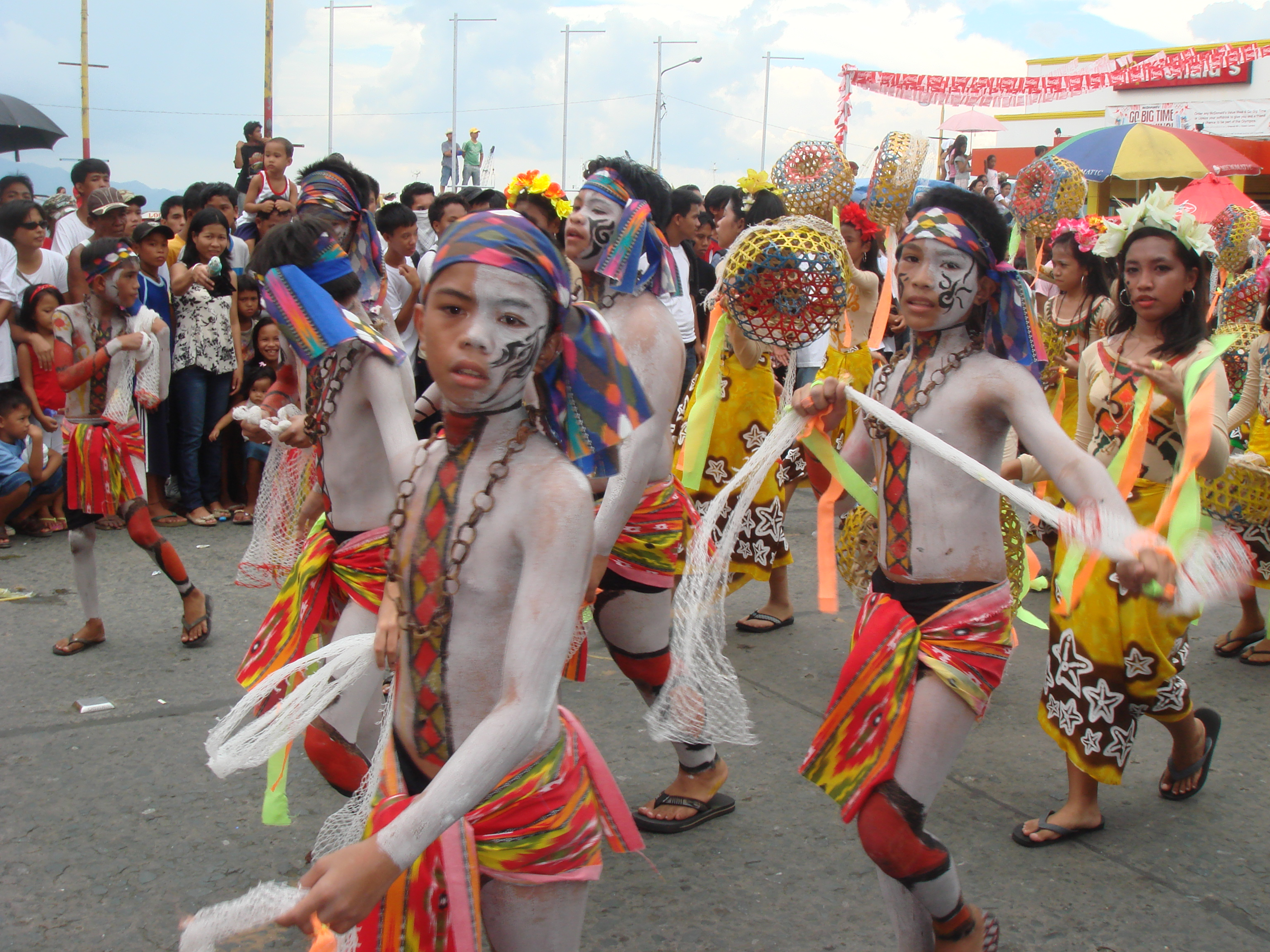
Dancers during the Pintados Festival in 2008

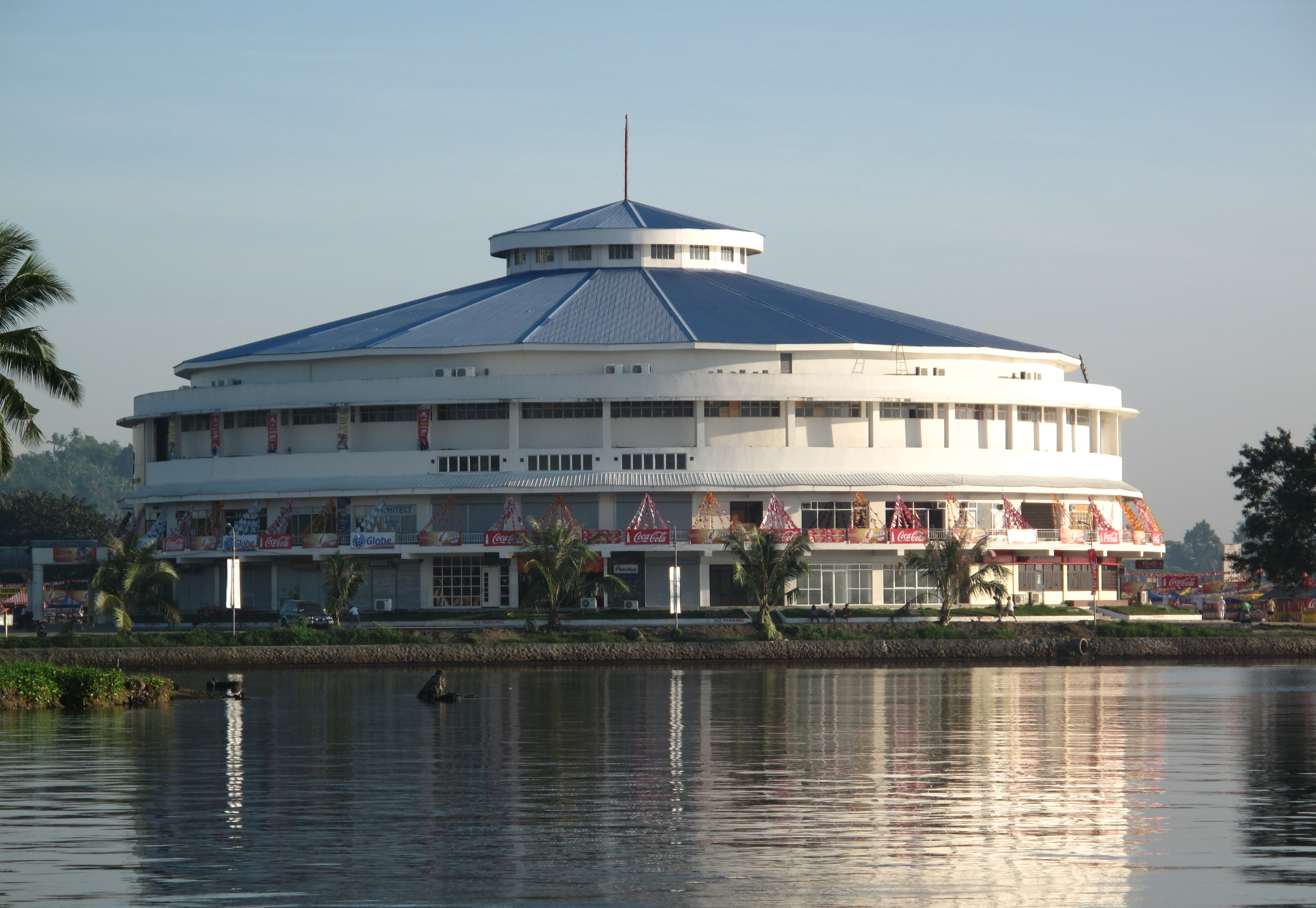
Tacloban City Convention Center, also known as the Tacloban Astrodome

The week-long celebrations peaks on June 30, the Grand fiesta of Tacloban celebrated with the traditional turn-over ceremonies of the "Teniente" made by the immediate past Hermano Mayor to the incoming Hermano Mayor. This is accompanied by the ritual of giving the medallion containing the names of all Hermanos Pasados and the Standartes. Fireworks and grand parades mark the occasion. Every house in the city prepares a feast and opens its doors to guests and well wishers.

Subiran Regatta
Subiran Regatta is a race of one-man native sailboats with outriggers locally called "subiran" along scenic and historic Leyte Gulf. The race is done without using a paddle but only with skills and techniques to manoeuver the sail. The Subiran Regatta is now in its 32nd year and counting. This contest is done annually during the weeklong celebration of the Tacloban City Fiesta. The race aims to preserve the art of sailing with the wind alone, and to showcase the mastery of this art by local boatmen.

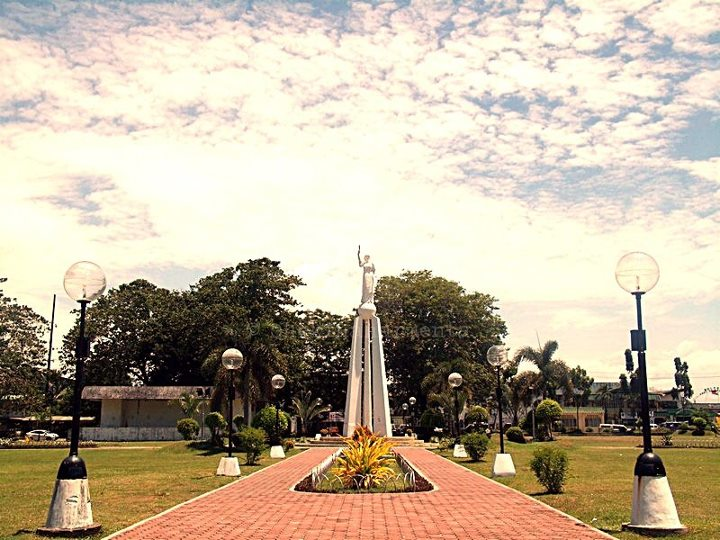
Plaza Libertad

Balyuan
Organized by the Department of Tourism and the city government, this activity which only started in 1975 is supposedly a re-enactment of a purported exchange of images between Barrio Buscada of Basey and Sitio Kankabatok, now Tacloban City. A local story which only saw print in the 20th century purports that in the old days, Sitio Kankabatok was a small barrio under the jurisdiction of Basey town in Samar. During the Feast of Santo Niño, the residents of Sitio Kankabatok would borrow the bigger image of the saint from the chapel of Barrio Buscada in Basey. Santo Niño is the revered patron saint of both Kankabatok and Barrio Buscada. The image was returned promptly after the festivities. When Kankabatok grew into a barrio of its own, the local Catholic authorities decided that the bigger Santo Niño image be retained in the prospering village. However, because of its highly questionable anthropological and historical basis, the story can be best understood as simply etiological. It gives witness to the cultural, ethnographical and historical relationship between the people of south Samar and the eastern seaboard of Leyte. Likewise, stories of the image missing in Buscada and turning up in Kankabatok aided to this decision of honoring this relationship. The Basey Flotilla bearing the church and government leaders goes on a fluvial procession along San Pedro Bay. A budyong (shell) call announces the sight of the flotilla off Kankabatok Bay.

Sangyaw Festival
Sangyaw is an archaic Waray word which means to herald the news. The Sangyaw Festival was created by Imelda Marcos in the 1980s. The festival was revived in 2008 by her nephew, current city mayor Alfred Romualdez. The Sangyaw Festival invites contingents of different performing groups of various festivals in the country to compete in this side of the region. Cash prizes and trophies are at stake as the Sangyaw Festival grooms itself to be a big festival to watch out in the succeeding years.

== Transportation ==
Daniel Z. Romualdez Airport

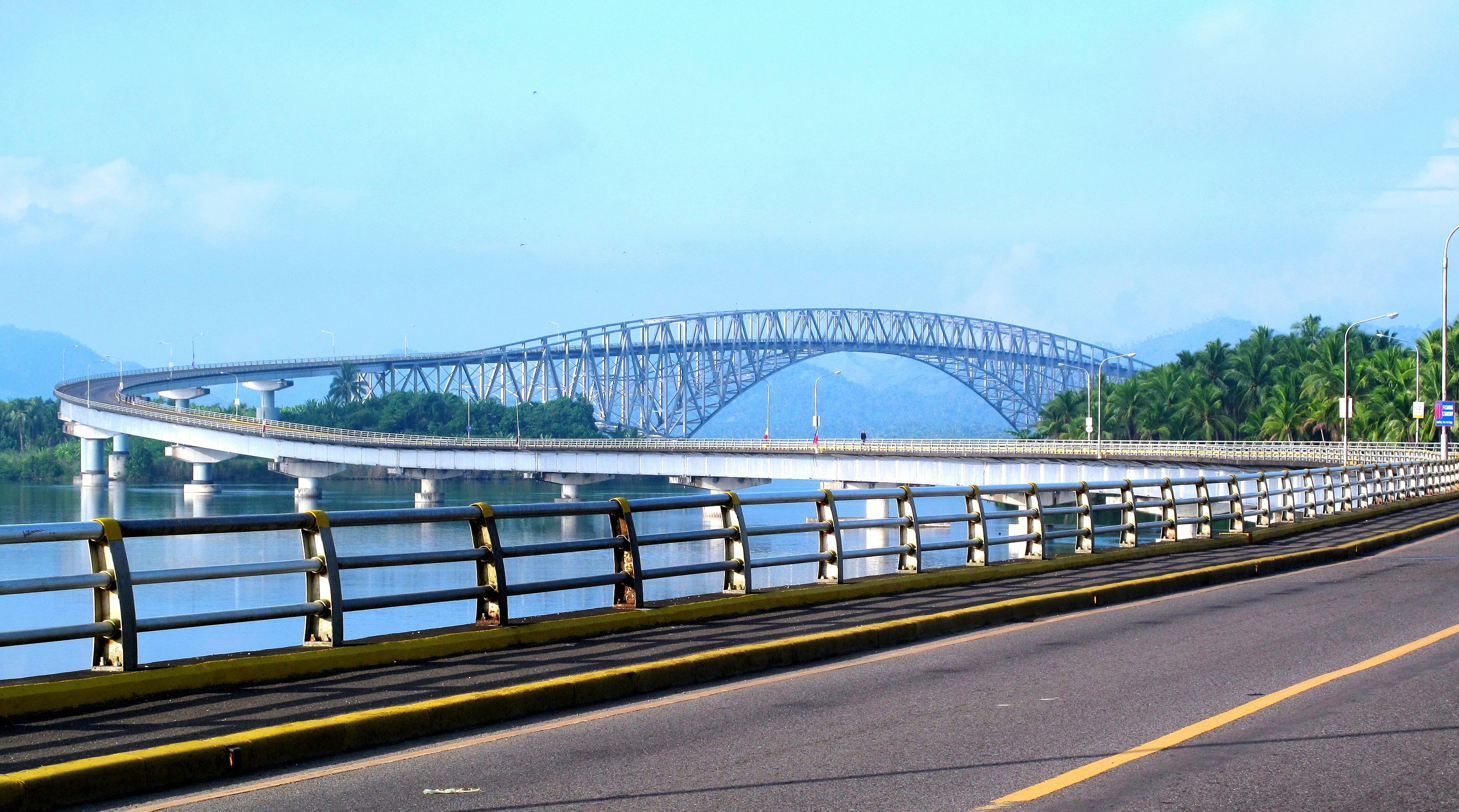
The San Juanico Bridge, north of the city

Tacloban is served by air, multicabs, taxis, jeepneys, buses, tricycles and pedicabs. The city host the Daniel Z. Romualdez Airport. The New Transport Terminal of Tacloban City or New Bus Terminal located in Abucay district serves as the land transportation hub to and from various points in the region. The San Juanico Bridge connects the city to the town of Santa Rita in Samar.

== Healthcare ==
As the regional center of Eastern Visayas, Tacloban offers a range of healthcare services. There are a number of hospitals and other medical institutions serving the city's population.

- Public hospitals
  - Eastern Visayas Medical Center (EVMC)
  - Tacloban City Hospital
- Private hospitals
  - ACE Medical Center Tacloban (near Robinsons Marasbaras)
  - Divine Word Hospital (owned by the Benedictine Sisters)
  - Our Mother of Mercy Hospital (owned by the Religious Sisters of Mercy)
  - Remedios Trinidad Romualdez Hospital (owned by the RTR Medical Foundation)
  - Tacloban Doctors Medical Center (owned by a group of locally prominent doctors)

== Education ==
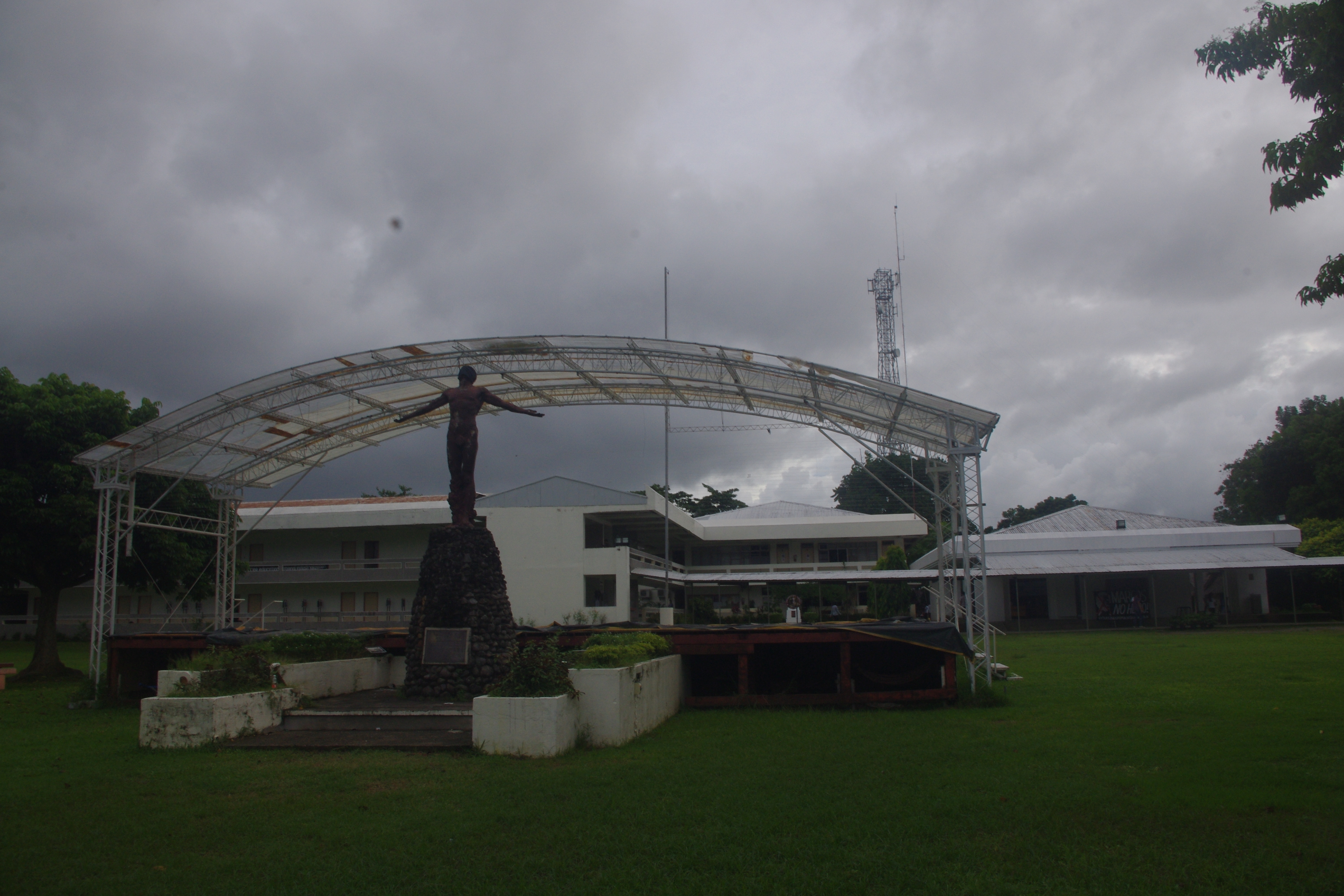
The University of the Philippines Tacloban

Tacloban has a variety of educational institutions both public and private.

Notable institutions include:

- UP Tacloban
- Leyte Normal University
- Eastern Visayas State University
- Holy Infant College
- Holy Spirit Foundation College, Inc.
- Holy Virgin of Salvacion Foundation College, Inc.
- ABE International Business College Tacloban
- ACLC College of Tacloban
- AMA College Tacloban (currently located in nearby Palo, Leyte)
- Asia Pacific Career College
- Asian Development Foundation College
- CIE British School Tacloban
- Colegio De La Salle Fondation de Tacloban, Inc.
- Dr. Vicente Orestes Romualdez Educational Foundation (College of Law)
- JE Mondejar Foundation College
- Leyte Colleges
- Leyte National High School
- National Maritime Polytechnic
- Remedios Trinidad Romualdez Medical Foundation
- Sacred Heart College of Tacloban
- St. Scholastica's College, Tacloban (currently located in nearby Palo, Leyte)
- St. Benedict College of Tacloban, Inc.
- Liceo del Verbo Divino (formerly "Divine Word University of Tacloban")
- St. Therese Educational Center of Leyte (STECL)
- St. Therese Christian Development Center Foundation, Inc. (STCDCFI)
- St. Therese Educational Foundation of Tacloban, Inc. (STEFTI)
- Saint Arnold Janssen College of Tacloban, Inc.
- Tacloban Angelicum Learning Center. (TALC)

== Media ==
=== Radio Stations ===
==== AM ====
- DYVL 819 - Aksyon Radio Tacloban (MBC Media Group) (Note: Facilities located in Palo, Leyte.)
- DYTH 990 - DZRH Tacloban (MBC Media Group)

==== FM ====
- DYAW 89.5 - Lamrag Radio Tacloban (Aliw Broadcasting Corporation)
- DYTM 91.1 - Love Radio Tacloban (MBC Media Group)
- DYTY 93.5 - Brigada News FM Tacloban (Baycomms Broacasting Corporation/Brigada Group)
- DYTX 95.1 - Bombo Radio Tacloban (Newsounds Broadcasting Network/Bombo Radyo Philippines)
- DYCJ 96.1 - One FM Tacloban (Radyo Pilipino Corporation)
- DYFE 97.5 (Far East Broadcasting Company)
- DYXV 98.3 - Magik FM Tacloban (Century Broadcasting Network)
- DYXY 99.1 - iFM RMN Tacloban (Radio Mindanao Network)
- DYDR 100.7 - FM Radio (Philippine Collective Media Corporation)
- DYTG 103.1 - K5 News FM Tacloban (Tagbilaran Broadcasting System)
- DYAB 104.7 - Dream Radio (Allied Broadcasting Center/Prime Media Services, affiliate)
- B 107.9 Tacloban (Prime Media Services)

=== TV ===
==== Broadcast stations ====
- (PA) Channel 2 (ALLTV, formerly ABS-CBN DYAB) - Advanced Media Broadcasting System (formerly from ABS-CBN Corporation)
- DYPN Channel 8 (PTV) - People's Television Network, Inc. (off-air)
- DYCL Channel 10 (GMA)/Digital channel 34 (GMA/GTV/Heart of Asia/I Heart Movies) - GMA Network, Inc.
- DYPR Channel 12 (A2Z)/Digital channel 50 (PRTV/TV5/A2Z) - Philippine Collective Media Corporation
- DYBJ Channel 26 (GTV) - GMA Network, Inc.
- (PA) Digital channel 28 (PRTV Prime Media/Knowledge Channel/Bilyonaryo News Channel/D8TV) - Broadcast Enterprises and Affiliated Media, Inc./Sphere Entertainment, Inc.
- (PA) Channel 40 (TV5) - Palawan Broadcasting Corporation/Prime Media Services (affiliate)

==== Cable Providers ====
- Filproducts Service TV
- Leyte Cable TV Network
- Cignal
- G Sat

== Sister cities ==
=== International ===
Fukuyama, Hiroshima, Japan

== Notable personalities ==
- Merlie Alunan - poet and instructor
- Gina Apostol - writer
- Toni Rose Basas - former professional volleyball player for the Cignal HD Spikers
- Norberto Castillo - 91st Rector Magnificus of the University of Santo Tomas
- Andres Centino - 57th Chief of Staff of the Armed Forces of the Philippines
- Kim Chiu - Pinoy Big Brother Teen Edition winner; television and movie star (has roots and partly grew up in Tacloban)
- Dennis Daa - professional basketball player
- Dino Daa - professional basketball player
- Bullet Dumas - indie and contemporary folk singer-songwriter
- Karla Estrada - actress and singer
- Ted Failon - news anchor, TV and radio personality, former Representative of the 1st District of Leyte
- Nieves Fernandez - World War II guerrilla fighter
- Jose Mari Gonzales - actor, father of former mayor Cristina Gonzales-Romualdez
- Xyza Gula - volleyball player for the UST Golden Tigresses
- Ruby Ibarra - Filipina-American rapper
- Iluminado Lucente - the "grand old man of Waray letters"; poet, playwright, and former mayor of Tacloban
- Carlo Francisco Manatad - filmmaker and film editor
- AZ Martinez - actress and beauty queen
- Joanné Nugas - Filipina-Swedish music artist and current member of a cappella group The Real Group
- Daniel Padilla - actor and singer
- Dan Palami - businessman, former manager of the Philippines national football team
- Joel Porlares – 14th Supreme Bishop of the Philippine Independent Church
- Rudy Robles - actor
- Benjamin Romualdez - former governor of Leyte; former ambassador to the US, China and Saudi Arabia
- Cristina Romualdez - former actress, former mayor of Tacloban City
- Ferdinand Martin Romualdez - Representative of the 1st District of Leyte; incumbent Speaker of the House of Representatives of the Philippines
- Imelda Romualdez-Marcos - former First Lady and former Representative for Leyte's 1st District
- Lou Salvador - basketball player
- Mark Swainston - footballer
- Jean-Paul Verona - award-winning producer and recording engineer best known for his work on Ben&Ben's Limasawa Street and Pebble House, Vol. 1: Kuwaderno albums and the band version of SB19's "Mapa" single
- Nimfa C. Vilches - judge and Supreme Court deputy administrator
- Aira Villegas - flyweight boxer and Olympic bronze medalist
