= DYTJ =

K5 News FM Kalibo (DYTJ)
Kalibo; Philippines
- Broadcast area: Aklan, parts of Antique and Capiz
- Frequency: 94.5 MHz
- Branding: 94.5 K5 News FM

Programming
- Languages: Akeanon, Filipino
- Format: Contemporary MOR, News, Talk
- Network: K5 News FM
- Affiliations: Abante; Bilyonaryo News Channel

Ownership
- Owner: Tagbilaran Broadcasting System
- Operator: 5K Broadcasting Network

History
- First air date: July 10, 2019
- Former names: Drive FM (July 10, 2019-September 1, 2022); Radyo Bandera Sweet FM (September 8, 2022-November 30, 2023)

Technical information
- Licensing authority: NTC
- Class: C, D, E
- Power: 5 kW
- ERP: 10 kW

Links
- Website: www.radyobandera.com

94.5 K5 News FM (DYTJ 94.5 MHz) is an FM station owned by Tagbilaran Broadcasting System and operated by 5K Broadcasting Network. Its studios and transmitter are located at Brgy. Bachao Sur, Kalibo.

The station was formerly known as Drive FM under GSM Broadcasting Services from July 10, 2019, until September 2022, when 5K Broadcasting took over its operations.
