= Yolanda Shipwreck Memorial Park =

Monument in Tacloban, Philippines

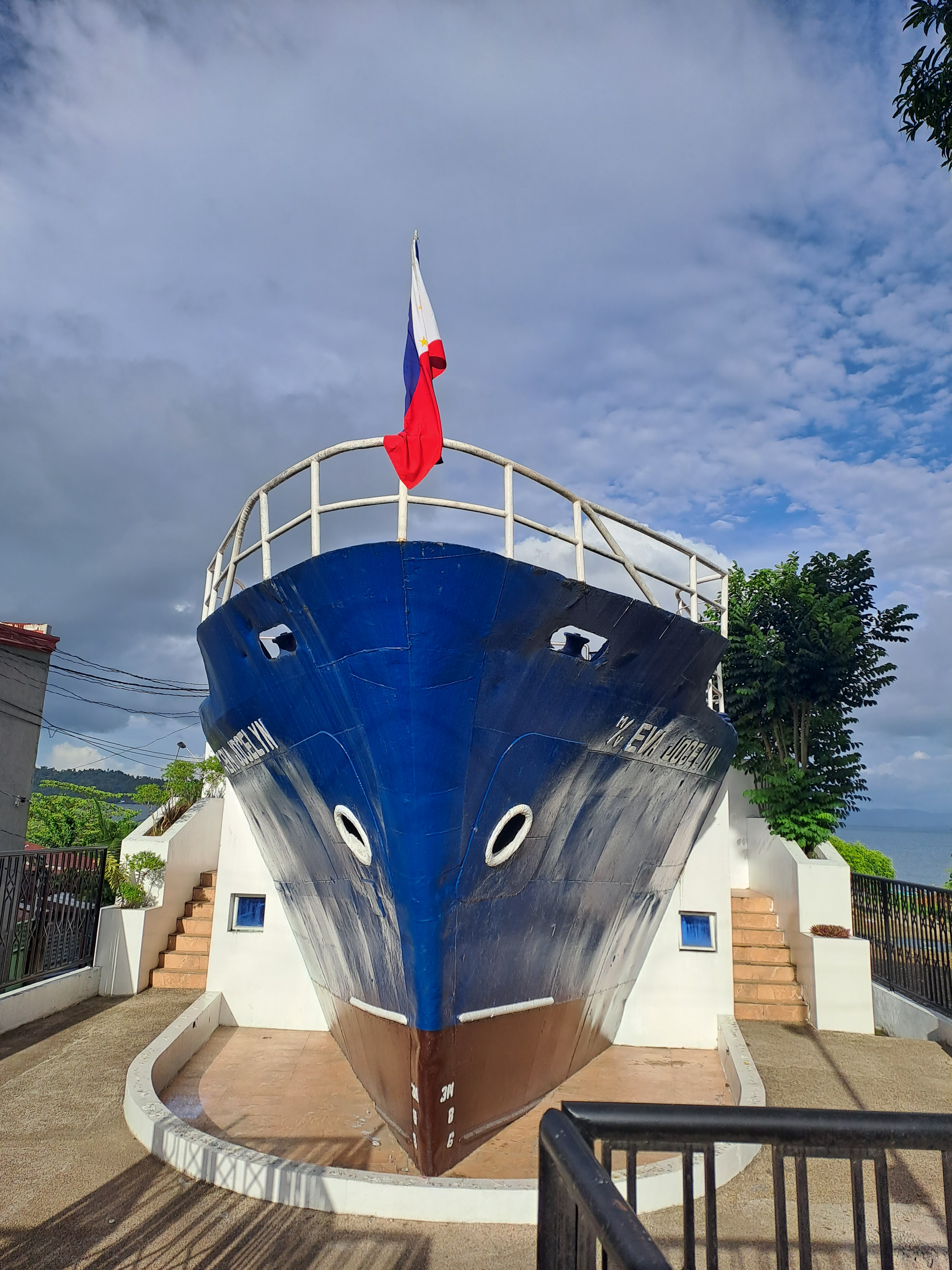
- The memorial in 2023
- Interactive map of Yolanda Shipwreck Memorial Park
- Location: Barangay Anibong 66-A, Tacloban, Leyte, Philippines
- Coordinates: 11°15′08″N 124°59′28″E
- Type: Memorial
- Length: 6 m (20 ft)
- Width: 8 m (26 ft)
- Opening date: November 7, 2015; 10 years ago
- Dedicated to: Victims of Typhoon Haiyan

Park details
- Area: 120 m^{2} (1,300 sq ft)
- Operator: Tacloban City Government

The Yolanda Shipwreck Memorial Park or the Anibong Memorial Park, colloquially known as the Yolanda Shrine, is a memorial created from portions of MV Eva Jocelyn, a cargo ship which was beached at Barangay Anibong, Tacloban, Leyte in Eastern Visayas. The monument is dedicated to rebuilding Tacloban after the onslaught of Typhoon Haiyan of 2013, which is known in the country as "Super Typhoon Yolanda."

== History ==
=== Beaching of MV Eva Jocelyn ===
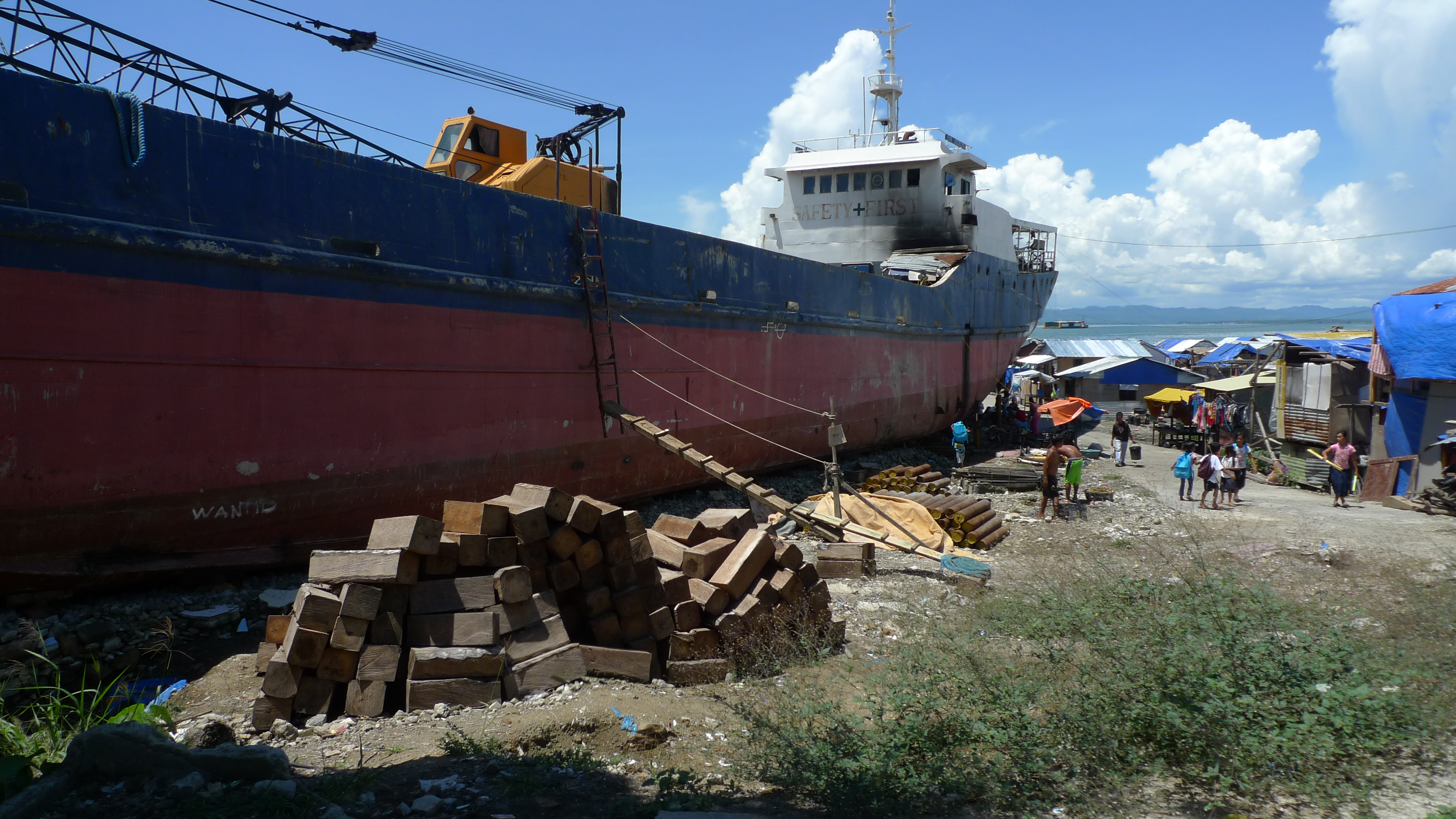
MV Eva Jocelyn shortly after it was washed ashore by Typhoon Haiyan in 2013

The MV Eva Jocelyn was originally a cargo ship owned by Mandaue-based Eva Shipping Lines. During the onslaught of Typhoon Haiyan (PAGASA name: Yolanda) on November 8, 2013, Eva Jocelyn ran aground due to storm surges from the typhoon, destroying ten houses and killing eleven. She would provide shelter for more than 30 people from the area during the disaster.

The wreck of Eva Jocelyn remained in place almost a year later. Eva Shipping Lines hired Philippines Precious Metal Resources as its contractor to dismantle the ship.

=== Conversion to a memorial park ===
A plan to convert MV Eva Jocelyn into a restaurant was rejected by Tourism Secretary Ramón Jiménez Jr., who deemed it disrespectful to the victims.

Nevertheless, the ship's bow remained and was donated to the Tacloban city government. It was finally converted into a monument as part of a memorial park dedicated to typhoon victims.

The Tacloban government spent ₱2.8 million for the conversion of the bow and its immediate area into a memorial park, which took five months. The memorial park was inaugurated on November 7, 2015, the eve of the second anniversary of Typhoon Haiyan making landfall.

== Park and monument ==
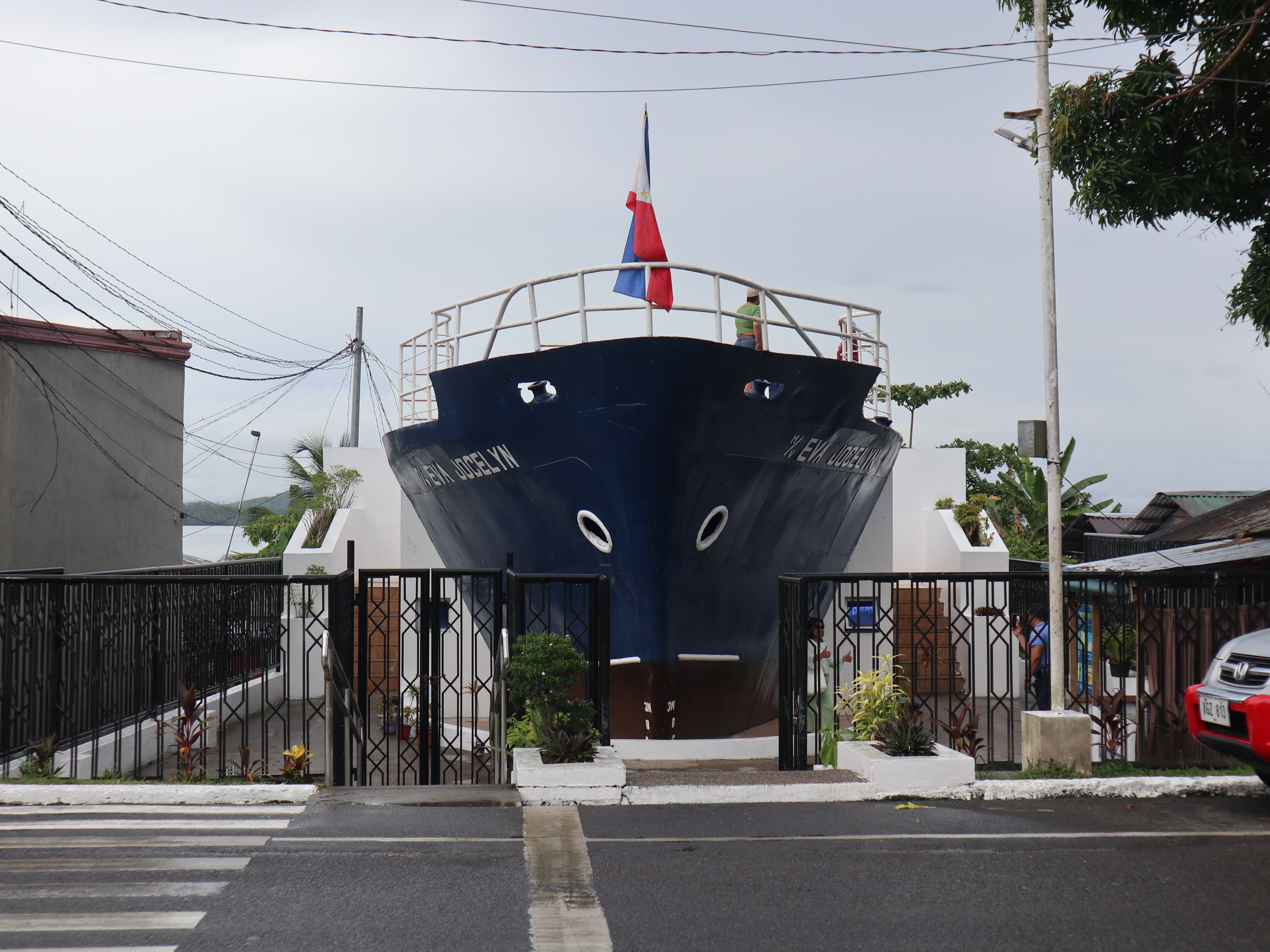
The MV Eva Jocelyn monument in 2023

The Yolanda Shipwreck Memorial Park covers an area of 120 square meters (1,300 sq ft). The memorial consists of the structure converted from the bow of MV Eva Jocelyn, measuring 8 by 6 meters (26 ft × 20 ft) and is supported by concrete. The structure facade is painted in blue and brown, with its deck floor fully tiled and the national flag is flown from the bow's fencing. The vicinity of the former ship was also barricaded with steel frames. Its interior serves as an office for its security guards.

The park is visited by thousands. It is reportedly a haunted location, with its guards allegedly hearing the voices of the typhoon victims at night. In late 2024, the Tacloban City Government erected a stone engraving with the list of names of the 11 victims of the ship.
