= Nieves Fernandez =

WWII Filipino guerrilla leader

- Captain Nieves Fernandez teaching U.S. Army Pvt. Andrew Lupiba on the usage of the bolo knife in combat in 1944.
- Born: c. 1906; Leyte, Philippines
- Died: c. 1997 (aged 90–91); Leyte, Philippines (possibly)
- Occupation: Teacher
- Known for: Guerrilla leader in World War II

Nieves Fernandez (born c. 1906 – 1997) was a Filipino guerrilla leader in Tacloban City, during World War II. Before the war, Fernandez worked as a local schoolteacher. When the Imperial Japanese began occupying the United States-held Commonwealth of the Philippines, including her hometown of Tacloban, Fernandez organized a resistance movement of around 110 fighters.

She then waged an unconventional war against the Imperial Japanese troops throughout their occupation until 1945. Fernandez became one of the most well-known female guerrilla leaders during the war. Her exploits would be remembered in newspapers, academic literature, and works of art.

== Biography ==
=== Before the war ===
Prior to the war, Fernandez worked as a schoolteacher and entrepreneur. Little else is known about her early life besides her birth sometime in 1906, probable Waray descent, and possible marriage based on an alleged photograph of hers. Her name "Nieves" is Spanish for "snows", and she was known for being "paler than most native woman in this section". Her students often referred to her as "Miss Fernandez", a moniker she continued to use even after the war.

=== Military exploits ===
Around the 1930s, the Empire of Japan, bolstered by its military and economic might, began expanding its territory in East Asia; putting it in conflict with regional and Western powers, most notably the United States of America who had large colonies in the continent. This escalated into the bombing of Pearl Harbor in 1941, triggering the start of the Pacific War, a theater of World War II. At the time, the Philippines was governed by the United States through the recently established Commonwealth government. Due to poor military strategy and a focus on the European theatre of war, the American and Filipino forces began losing ground, even with stiff resistance, to the Japanese military. One of the areas taken over was Fernandez's hometown of Tacloban, at the northeast coast of the Eastern Visayan island of Leyte.

During the Japanese occupation, many people in Leyte were treated cruelly by the Japanese, whose atrocities included robbery and rape. In her own words, she said, "No one could keep anything. They took everything they wanted." Fernandez, aged 38, was one of many who fought against the Japanese occupation of the Philippines. Barefoot and often wearing a frock, she recruited 110 native men. Her group initially had only three American rifles, and they relied mostly on improvised explosive devices and grenades, traditional bolo knives, and single-shot pipe shotguns using nails as ammunition. Later on, they acquired more American firearms and captured Japanese weapons. Her guerrilla group became part of the Black Army formed and led by Ruperto Kangleon, with south Tacloban being her main area of combat operations.

She earned the nickname "Captain Fernandez" and "The Silent Killer" due to her exploits, though the highest official rank she attained was Sergeant. Fernandez trained her men vigorously in manufacturing weapons and conducting ambushes. She was knowledgeable in the use of the bolo during stealth, even demonstrating her technique to Americans who had met her. She killed around 200 Japanese officers, and U.S. Intelligence reported that the Japanese had placed a bounty of ₱10,000 on her head. She was wounded three times, bearing a scar on her right forearm.

Captain Edward A. Odrowski of the U.S. Army’s 44th General Hospital recalled a female guerrilla during his time in Leyte, whom his son, historian and author James R. Odrowski, believed to have been Nieves Fernandez. He wrote:

She was slight of build, but looked tough. She had a bolo knife attached to her belt. On the other side of her belt hung the head of a Japanese soldier. She requested to speak to an officer. She said that she would sneak up from behind and dispatch them with one slash of her knife.

=== Postwar activities ===
The Philippines was finally liberated from the Japanese beginning in 1944, and Fernandez was honorably discharged from the military on May 31, 1945 with the rank of Sergeant, under the unit of Headquarters & Service Company, 95th Infantry, Leyte Area Command.

It is unknown what exactly happened to Fernandez after the war, although she is rumored to have quietly lived to her nineties in Tacloban with her sons and grandchildren.

== Legacy ==
Nieves Fernandez's military career was first documented in the newspapers The Lewiston Daily Sun, Associated Press, and Mexican-American Review between 1944-1945. American soldiers visited her after the war; one of them, Stanley Troutman, snapped a picture of her teaching Pvt. Andrew Lupiba how to kill with a bolo. The historical photograph is currently stored in the organization Rare Historical Photos. Dustin Koski from Top Tenz listed Nieves Fernandez at #8 on his list of "10 of History’s Most Badass Women".

Ben Thompson made a digital comic of Fernandez as part of his Badass series of blogs and books. She also became the subject of a painting and an article by Nicole Gervacio for the South Seattle Emerald, stating that she "resonates because of her unquestionable braveness, ferocity, and boldness", adding that she "contradicts the stereotype of the submissive woman: leading her men into hostile situations and fighting alongside them to take back their land."

A hospital ward at Eastern Visayas Medical Center in Tacloban was named the Captain Nieves Fernandez Veterans Ward, funded by the local branch of Philippine Veterans Affairs. The ward houses 15 beds exclusively for the medical treatment of World War II veterans, Korean War veterans, and other retired Filipino military personnel.
