= DYTG =

Radio station in Tacloban, Philippines

K5 News FM Tacloban (DYTG)
Tacloban; Philippines
- Broadcast area: Northern Leyte, southern Samar
- Frequency: 103.1 MHz
- Branding: 103.1 K5 News FM

Programming
- Languages: Waray, Filipino
- Format: Contemporary MOR, News, Talk
- Network: K5 News FM

Ownership
- Owner: Tagbilaran Broadcasting System
- Operator: 5K Broadcasting Network

History
- First air date: 2016
- Former names: Dream Radio (2016–2022); Kaboses Radio (January – July 2023); Radyo Bandera (August – November 2023)
- Call sign meaning: Tagbilaran

Technical information
- Licensing authority: NTC
- Class: C, D, E
- Power: 5 kW
- ERP: 10 kW

103.1 K5 News FM (DYTG 103.1 MHz) is an FM station owned by Tagbilaran Broadcasting System and operated by 5K Broadcasting Network. Its studios and transmitter are located at Zone 4, Brgy. Utap, Tacloban.

== History ==
The frequency was formerly occupied by Dream Radio under Prime Media Services from 2016 to the end of 2022, when it swapped frequencies with sister station Kaboses Radio. On July 12, 2023, it went off the air and migrated its operations online. On November 23, the station returned to terrestrial air on 107.9 MHz.

5K Broadcasting Network took over the station's operations. On August 14, it was launched under the Radyo Bandera Sweet FM network, which became K5 News FM on December 1.
