= DYTR-FM =

Radio station in Bohol, Philippines

Balita FM (DYTR)
- Tagbilaran; Philippines
- Broadcast area: Bohol, parts of Cebu
- Frequency: 91.1 MHz
- Branding: 91.1 Balita FM

Programming
- Languages: Boholano, Filipino
- Format: Contemporary MOR, OPM, News
- Affiliations: Radio Mindanao Network

Ownership
- Owner: Tagbilaran Broadcasting System
- Sister stations: DYTR 1116

History
- First air date: 1990
- Former names: True Radio (1990-2020)
- Call sign meaning: Tagbilaran Radio

Technical information
- Licensing authority: NTC
- Power: 2,000 watts

Links
- Website: 911balitafmbohol.my.canva.site/91-1-balita-fm-bohol

DYTR (91.1 FM), broadcasting as 91.1 Balita FM, is a radio station owned and operated by Tagbilaran Broadcasting System. The station's studio and transmitter facilities are located at CAP Bldg., J. Borja St. cor. Carlos P. Garcia Ave., Tagbilaran.

== History ==
The station was inaugurated in 1990 as True Radio 911 with a mass-based format. At that time, it was formerly affiliated with the ABS-CBN Corporation. In 2017, it became an affiliate of Radio Mindanao Network. In November 2020, the station rebranded as Balita FM and added news and talk to its programming.
