= DYTR-AM =

Radio station in the Philippines

DYTR
- Tagbilaran; Philippines
- Broadcast area: Bohol and parts of Cebu
- Frequency: 1116 kHz
- Branding: DYTR 1116

Programming
- Languages: Boholano, Filipino
- Format: News, Public Affairs, Talk
- Affiliations: Radio Mindanao Network

Ownership
- Owner: Tagbilaran Broadcasting System
- Sister stations: 91.1 Balita FM

History
- First air date: 1980
- Former call signs: DYHD (1980-2000)
- Call sign meaning: Tagbilaran Radio

Technical information
- Licensing authority: NTC
- Class: B (regional)
- Power: 5,000 watts

Links
- Webcast: Listen Live

DYTR (1116 AM) is a radio station owned and operated by Tagbilaran Broadcasting System. The station's studio is located at CAP Bldg., J. Borja St. cor. Carlos P. Garcia Ave., Tagbilaran, and its transmitter facilities are located at Brgy. Dao, Tagbilaran.
