= Tagbilaran Broadcasting System =

Radio network in the Philippines

- Type: Private
- Industry: Broadcast
- Founded: 1980
- Headquarters: CAP Bldg., J. Borja St. cor. Carlos P. Garcia Ave., Tagbilaran

Tagbilaran Broadcasting System (also known as Community Media Network) is a Philippine radio network. Its corporate office is located at CAP Bldg., J. Borja St. cor. Carlos P. Garcia Ave., Tagbilaran.

== TBS stations ==
=== AM stations ===
Branding	Callsign	Frequency	Location
DYTR 1116	DYTR	1116 kHz	Tagbilaran

=== FM stations ===
Branding	Callsign	Frequency	Location
Balita FM	DYTR	91.1 MHz	Tagbilaran
K5 News FM Tacloban	DYTG	103.1 MHz	Tacloban
CAP Rhythm	DYCN	88.9 MHz	Roxas City
K5 News FM Kalibo	DYTJ	94.5 MHz	Kalibo
Voice FM	—N/a	89.1 MHz	San Jose

=== Former TV stations ===
Callsign	Channel	Location	Affiliation
D-9-YA	TV-9	Tagbilaran	Defunct
