= DYAB-FM =

Radio station in Tacloban, Philippines

Dream Radio (DYAB)
- Tacloban; Philippines
- Broadcast area: Northern Leyte, southern Samar
- Frequency: 104.7 MHz
- Branding: Dream Radio 104.7

Programming
- Languages: Waray, Filipino, English
- Format: Contemporary MOR, OPM
- Affiliations: True FM

Ownership
- Owner: Allied Broadcasting Center
- Operator: Prime Media Services
- Sister stations: B 107.9 FM

History
- First air date: February 2018
- Former names: Kaboses Radio (2018–2022)
- Call sign meaning: Allied Broadcasting

Technical information
- Licensing authority: NTC
- Power: 5 kW
- Repeater: Ormoc: DYOC 99.9 MHz

Links
- Webcast: Listen Live
- Website: dreamradiotacloban.weebly.com

Dream Radio 104.7 (DYAB 104.7 MHz) is an FM station owned by Allied Broadcasting Center and operated under airtime lease agreement by Prime Media Services. Its studios and transmitter are located at the Ground Floor, Residencia Marfel, #23 Lukban St., Tacloban.

The frequency was formerly occupied by Kaboses Radio from its inception in 2018 to the end of 2022, when it swapped frequencies with then-sister station Dream Radio.
