= Cebu Water =

- Company type: Private
- Founded: Cebu, Philippines
- Headquarters: 3/F Unit 305 Cebu Holdings Center, Cebu Business Park, Cardinal Rosales Avenue, Cebu City, Cebu, Philippines
- Key people: Virgilio C. Rivera Jr., President
- Products: Water Delivery
- Website: Cebu Water

Cebu Manila Water Development, Inc., branded as Cebu Water (stylized in uppercase), is an investment agreement between the Provincial Government of Cebu and Manila Water Philippine Ventures where of 51 percent is owned by the consortium The agreement calls for the development and operation of a water supply system that will supply 35 million liter of water per day to target cities and municipalities in the central and northern portions Cebu. The term of the agreement is 30 years starting in March 2012, renewable for another 25 year.

The Manila Water Consortium is composed of Manila Water Company, Inc., Metro Pacific Water Investments Corporation, and Vicsal Development Company, Inc.,

The Cebu bulk water supply project is the first in Cebu to utilize a large-scale sustainable surface water source from Luyang River in the municipality of Carmen, Cebu. It is expected to improve the current groundwater condition in Cebu which has deteriorated due to excessive use of deep wells.

== Related Links ==
- Manila Water Company
- Laguna Water
- Boracay Water
- Clark Water
