= Iloilo–Capiz–Aklan Expressway =

Proposed intra-island expressway in the Philippines

- Panay Expressway
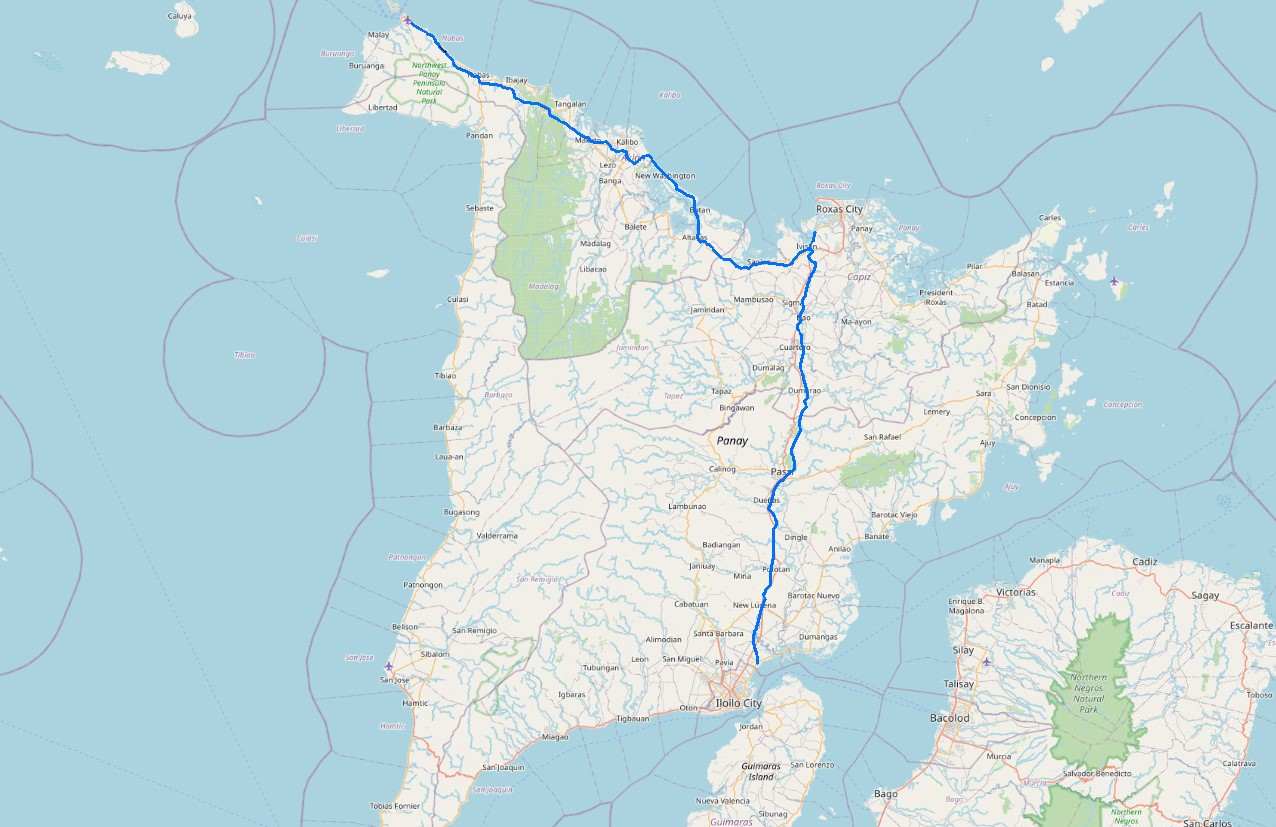
- Map of Western Visayas with proposed route of ICAEX

Route information
- Length: 210 km (130 mi)

Major junctions
- From: Leganes
- To: Malay

Location
- Country: Philippines
- Regions: Western Visayas
- Provinces: Aklan, Capiz, and Iloilo
- Major cities: Passi and Roxas

Highway system
- Roads in the Philippines; Highways; Expressways; List

The Iloilo–Capiz–Aklan Expressway (ICAEX), also known as the Panay Expressway, is a proposed 4-lane, 210-kilometer (130 mi), full-access controlled toll expressway on the island of Panay in the Philippines. It will comprise elevated roadways, viaducts, a tunnel, and a long-span bridge.

The project will traverse the two cities of Passi and Roxas and 20 municipalities across the three provinces of Aklan, Capiz, and Iloilo on Panay Island. The main entry point in Iloilo will be located in Barangay M.V. Hechanova in the municipality of Leganes, north of Iloilo City. This location was chosen strategically for its proximity to the proposed bridge approach of the Panay-Guimaras Bridge, which is part of the Panay–Guimaras–Negros Island Bridges Project. The expressway's exit point will be located in Malay, Aklan, which is the gateway to Boracay. The Boracay Bridge is also being proposed under the Department of Public Works and Highways (DPWH)'s Public-Private Partnership (PPP) projects and may also be connected to the expressway once completed.

The ICAEX aims to reduce travel time between the provinces of Aklan, Capiz, and Iloilo and to eliminate congestion on existing highways by bypassing chokepoints in populated areas. It also seeks to enhance the logistics network, emergency response, and tourism in Western Visayas.

The project is expected to reduce the travel time between Iloilo City and Boracay to 2.5 hours, down from 6 to 7 hours.

== History ==
The Iloilo–Capiz–Aklan Expressway was initially unveiled as the Panay Expressway by then-President Rodrigo Duterte in his State of the Nation Address (SONA) in 2016, along with the proposed revival of Panay Railways. However, the project was never finalized.

The expressway was proposed again by the Department of Public Works and Highways (DPWH) in 2022. The current administration, under President Bongbong Marcos, has shown support for the project, advancing it as a potential future development. It is now considered a public-private partnership (PPP) initiative, with a feasibility study expected to be completed in 2024.
