= Boracay Bridge =

Proposed bridge in Malay, Aklan, Philippines

- Coordinates: 11.9394°N 121.9467°E
- Locale: Malay, Aklan, Philippines
- Begins: Caticlan, Malay, Aklan
- Ends: Boracay Island, Malay, Aklan
- Owner: Department of Public Works and Highways

Characteristics
- Total length: 2.54 kilometers (1.58 mi) (total system); 1.14 kilometers (0.71 mi) (bridge span)

History
- Constructed by: San Miguel Holdings Corporation
- Construction cost: ₱7.78 billion (2026 estimate)

Location
- Interactive map of Boracay Bridge

The Boracay Bridge is a proposed 1.14-kilometer (0.71 mi) bridge in Malay, Aklan, Philippines. It is designed to connect the island of Boracay to the barangay of Caticlan on mainland Panay. The project is being implemented under a public–private partnership (PPP) framework by the Department of Public Works and Highways (DPWH).

Awarded to San Miguel Holdings Corporation (SMHC) in March 2026, the bridge is intended to provide all-weather access to the island, facilitate the transport of solid waste and utilities, and ease congestion in the current boat-based transport system. It has been criticized by the municipal government of Malay, the Archbishop of Capiz, and the local Ati people.

== History ==
Boracay is a small island separated from the much larger Panay Island by a narrow strait. Access to Boracay for both passengers and cargo is currently only possible by boat, as the nearest airport, Godofredo P. Ramos Airport, is also located on Panay.

The proposal for a bridge linking Boracay to the mainland was first floated by national government agencies following the 2018 Boracay closure and redevelopment. Proponents argued that a permanent link would solve long-standing logistics issues, including the high cost of transporting goods and the difficulty of managing waste on the island.

In 2024, San Miguel Holdings Corp. (SMHC) submitted an unsolicited proposal for the project. After a competitive challenge process conducted under the PPP Code of the Philippines (Republic Act No. 11966), SMHC was named the winning proponent. On March 25, 2026, DPWH Secretary Vivencio Dizon issued the Notice of Award to SMHC for the financing, design, construction, operation, and maintenance of the bridge.

== Design ==
The project involves 2.54 kilometers of new road with a 1.14-kilometer limited-access bridge. The bridge design includes lanes for motorized vehicles, pedestrians and bicycles and provisions for power cables, telecommunication lines, water supply pipes, and sewerage systems, aimed at reducing the island's reliance on underwater pipes and cables.

The concession agreement spans 30 years, during which SMHC will be responsible for the bridge's upkeep and operation through regulated toll fees.

== Opposition ==
The project has faced significant resistance from local government units and environmental stakeholders. The Malay Municipal Government has issued a resolution formally opposing the bridge. Victor Bendico, the Archbishop of Capiz, issued a statement warning that building the bridge "risks repeating the same mistakes" that led to the 2018 closure. The local Ati people also issued a video statement opposing the bridge, saying it threatens "their life and their dreams".

Environmental advocates have argued that the bridge could lead to overdevelopment and exceed the island's carrying capacity. Local boat operators, who currently provide the primary means of transport between Caticlan and Boracay, have expressed fears of displacement. Furthermore, local officials have criticized the national government for allegedly bypassing local consultation requirements. DPWH Secretary Dizon, however, has stated that San Miguel Corporation will work to address these grievances as the project moves forward.
