= Boracay =

Island in the Philippines

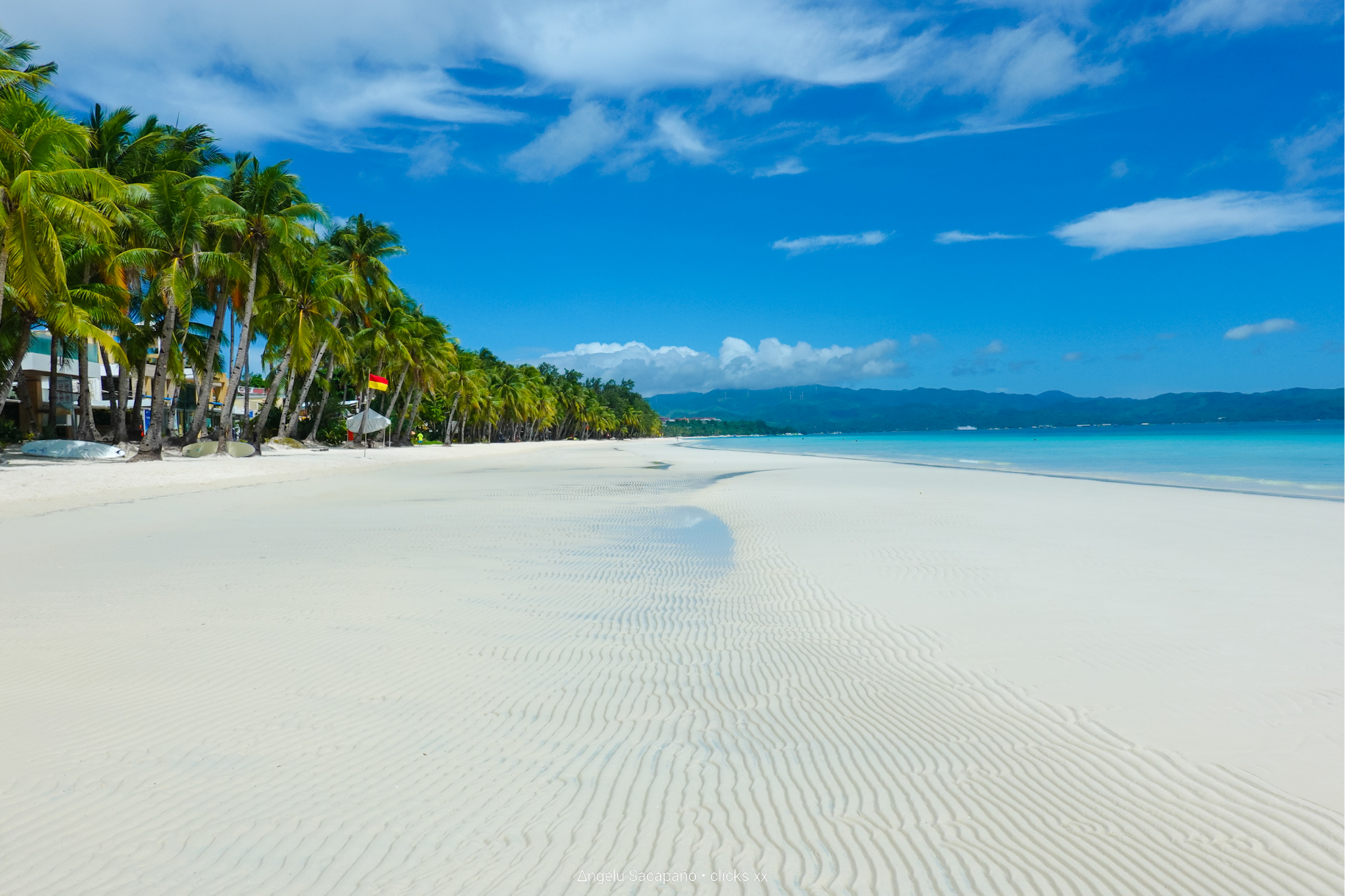
- Boracay Island white sand beach

- Location within Visayas Location within Philippines

Geography
- Coordinates: 11°58′8″N 121°55′26″E
- Archipelago: Visayas
- Adjacent to: Jintotolo Channel; Sibuyan Sea; Sulu Sea; Tablas Strait
- Area: 10.32 km^{2} (3.98 sq mi)
- Highest elevation: 302 ft (92 m)
- Highest point: Mount Luho

Administration
- Philippines
- Region: Western Visayas
- Province: Aklan
- Municipality: Malay
- Barangays: Balabag; Manoc-Manoc; Yapak
- Largest settlement: Manoc-Manoc (pop. 22,207)

Demographics
- Population: 41,777 (2024)
- Pop. density: 3,663/km^{2} (9487/sq mi)
- Ethnic groups: Ati; Aklanon; Hiligaynon; Karay-a

Boracay ([bɔˈrakaɪ]; sometimes shortened by non-natives as Bora (Note: An exonym, which locals of the island discourages and considers to be a pejorative.)) is a resort island in the Western Visayas region of the Philippines, located 0.8 kilometers (0.50 mi) off the northwest coast of Panay Island. It has a total land area of 10.32 square kilometers (3.98 sq mi), under the jurisdiction of three barangays in Malay, Aklan, and had a population of 41,777 in 2024.

Boracay was originally inhabited by the Panay Bukidnon and Ati people, but commercial development has led to their severe marginalization since the 1970s.

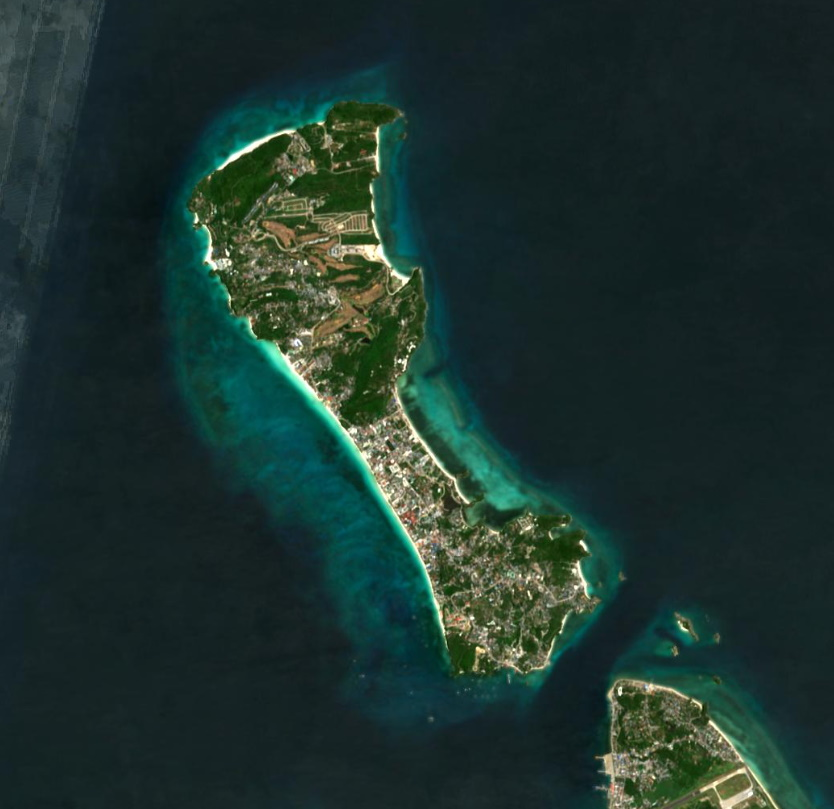
Boracay island from space

Apart from its white sand beaches, Boracay is also famous for being one of the world's top destinations for relaxation. As of 2013, it was emerging among the top destinations for tranquility and nightlife.

International travel magazine Travel + Leisure ranked Boracay as the Best Island in the World in 2012. In 2014, the resort island was at the top of the "Best Islands in the World" list published by the international magazine Condé Nast Traveler. In 2016, Boracay headed the magazine's list of "Top 10 destinations to watch".

In April 2018, the Philippine government, under President Rodrigo Duterte, decreed a six-month closure of the island for tourists to undertake major renovation works, especially of the sewage system, which had become obsolete and insufficient. The island was administered by the Boracay Inter-agency Task Force during the closure. (Note: The term of the task force expired on May 8, 2021. As of March 2021, it was reported to have been seeking a one-year extension.) It reopened in October 2018, with a new set of rules meant to address a variety of issues, and help control tourist growth in the future. Under the new rules, the Boracay beachfront was cleared of masseuses, bonfires, beach vendors and sunset bonfires. Buildings were bulldozed and beach businesses set back to create a 30-metre buffer zone from the waterline.

The Boracay Ati-atihan in January 2024 witnessed a record-breaking number of tourists, with 36,741 people participating in the event. This festival, which celebrates the cultural heritage of the Ati indigenous people, has been a major draw for tourists and is set to be elevated as a major tourism attraction for the island starting in 2025.

== Etymology ==
The name Boracay is attributed to different origins. The first one that came from the Ati people says that the name of the island came from the Inati words "bora", meaning bubbles, and "bocay", meaning white. Another theory suggests that the name is derived from the local word 'borac,' which means 'white cotton,' referencing the color and texture of Boracay's white, sugary, and powdery sand. Yet another version dating back to the Spanish era says the name is derived from "sagay", the word for a shell, and "boray", the word for seed.

The island is sometimes referred to as simply "Bora" by outsiders for convenience. However locals including tourism stakeholders have highly discouraged the use of the name which is widely considered to be derogatory or disrespectful. Among the reasons include to distinguish Boracay from the island of Bora Bora of the French Polynesia.

The municipal government of Malay passed an ordinance in February 2011, mandating its municipal licensing office to refuse licenses to businesses seeking to operate under a name including "Bora" rather than "Boracay". Usage of the diminutive is also prohibited in promotional materials and business activities.

== History ==
=== Pre-colonial history ===
Before the Spanish colonization of the Philippines in the 16th century, Boracay was populated by Ati people. It was known to the Iberians as Buracay. At the time of contact with the Europeans, Buracay had a population of one hundred people, who cultivated rice on the island and augmented their income by raising goats.

The Tumandok people also established an indigenous presence on the island, although the identities of the two indigenous peoples is often conflated. A 1905 report by the Philippine Commission documented the continuing presence of both groups on the island. referred to there as "Buracay".

Archeological-wise and Historiographical-wise Boracay island was at the cross-roads of maritime shipping between the rival Philippine Port-Kingdoms of the Kedatuan of Madja-as (ᜋᜇ᜔ᜌ᜵ ᜀᜐ᜔), the nation of Sandao (三洲), and Buddhist Ma-i (ᜫᜡ), which most likely made Boracay a lively naval route, trading spot, but also battlefield among the three kingdoms.

The Kedatuan of Madja-as including the datus of Capiz and Aklan where Boracay neighbors, often raided Luzon and Mindoro in the north; the locations of the kingdoms of Tondo and Ma-i that there is an old Visayan saying: “sa diin timo nangayaw nga mait” which translates as “did you raid (pangayaw) up north (mait)?” but actually means “where have you been?”, as a memory of Panay raids against the kingdoms of Mindoro and Luzon.

=== Colonial Era and Post-Independence era history ===
==== Administration under Ibajay and Buruanga ====
Boracay, as well as the rest of Aklan, was previously part of the province of Capiz. It was under the jurisdiction of the municipality of Buruanga itself ruling over the town of Ibajay which was the intermediary for Buracay (Historical spelling of Boracay) and its surroundings at Northwestern Panay island.

The 1818 census shows that there were 1,268 native families and also a relatively decent number of 30 Spanish-Filipino families that also lived in Ibajay, Malay and also Boracay.

==== Introduction of Plantation Agriculture (1910s) ====
Before the advent of tourism, Boracay was largely an agricultural community. Around 1910, Sofía Gonzáles Tirol and her husband Lamberto Hontiveros Tirol (a town judge on the Panay mainland) took ownership of substantial properties on the island. They planted coconuts, fruit trees and greenery. Others followed the Tirols, and cultivation and development of the island gradually spread.

==== Establishment of Malay and Aklan ====
Buruanga continued to administer Boracay until the municipality of Malay was established on June 15, 1949.

The municipality, as well as the island, became part of Aklan, which became an independent province on April 25, 1956.

=== During the Marcos dictatorship ===
==== Displacement of the Boracay Ati people (1978 onwards) ====
On Nov. 10, 1978, six years after the declaration of Martial Law under Ferdinand Marcos, 65 Philippine islands including Boracay was declared "tourist zones and marine reserves" without any mention of the status of the Ati who were the original residents of the island.

The de facto dispossession of Ati lands on Boracay by Marcos placed the islands under the control of the Philippine Tourism Authority, and marked the beginning of rapid development on the island. In turn, this resulted in the further marginalization of the Boracay Ati for decades.

==== Decline of plantations and fishing industry (1970s) ====
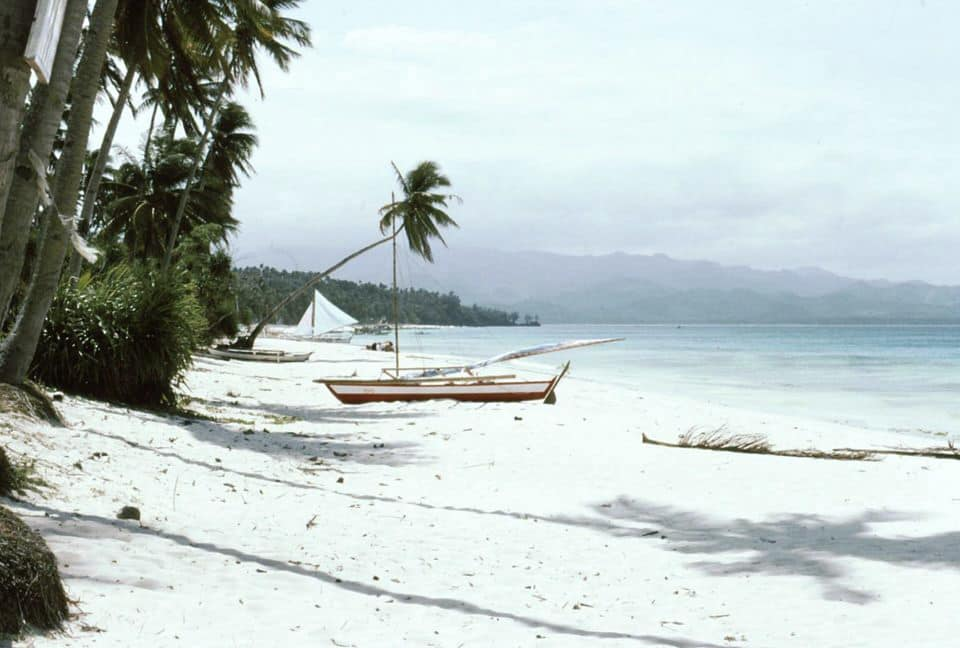
Boracay in the 1970s, during the decline of its fishing industry, before it shifted to tourism as a source of income.

The production of copra and fishing were major industries in the island. However, due to overharvesting by fishers and the destruction of coral reefs due to cyanide fishing during this era, the fishing industry saw a decline. By the 1980s, the price of copra had declined, encouraging tourism as an alternative source of income for the island.

==== Early developments in tourism (1970s) ====
Tourism came to the island beginning sometime in the 1970s. In 1970, the movies Nam's Angels (released in the U.S. as The Losers) and Too Late the Hero used filming locations on Boracay and Caticlan.

The mid-1970s also saw the purchase of lands in Boracay by Fred Elizalde of the Basque-Hispanic Elizalde family, which had made its fortunes from sugar holdings in Negros and Tanduay distillery in Manila, and whose brother Manuel was head of the Presidential Assistant on National Minorities. Their properties would later play a big role in Boracay's conversion into a tourist-oriented economy.

In 1978, there was an influx of Western tourists after German writer Jens Peter called it "paradise on Earth" in his book about the Philippines.

=== Later 20th and early 21st Century ===
==== Increasing popularity (1980s and 1990s) ====
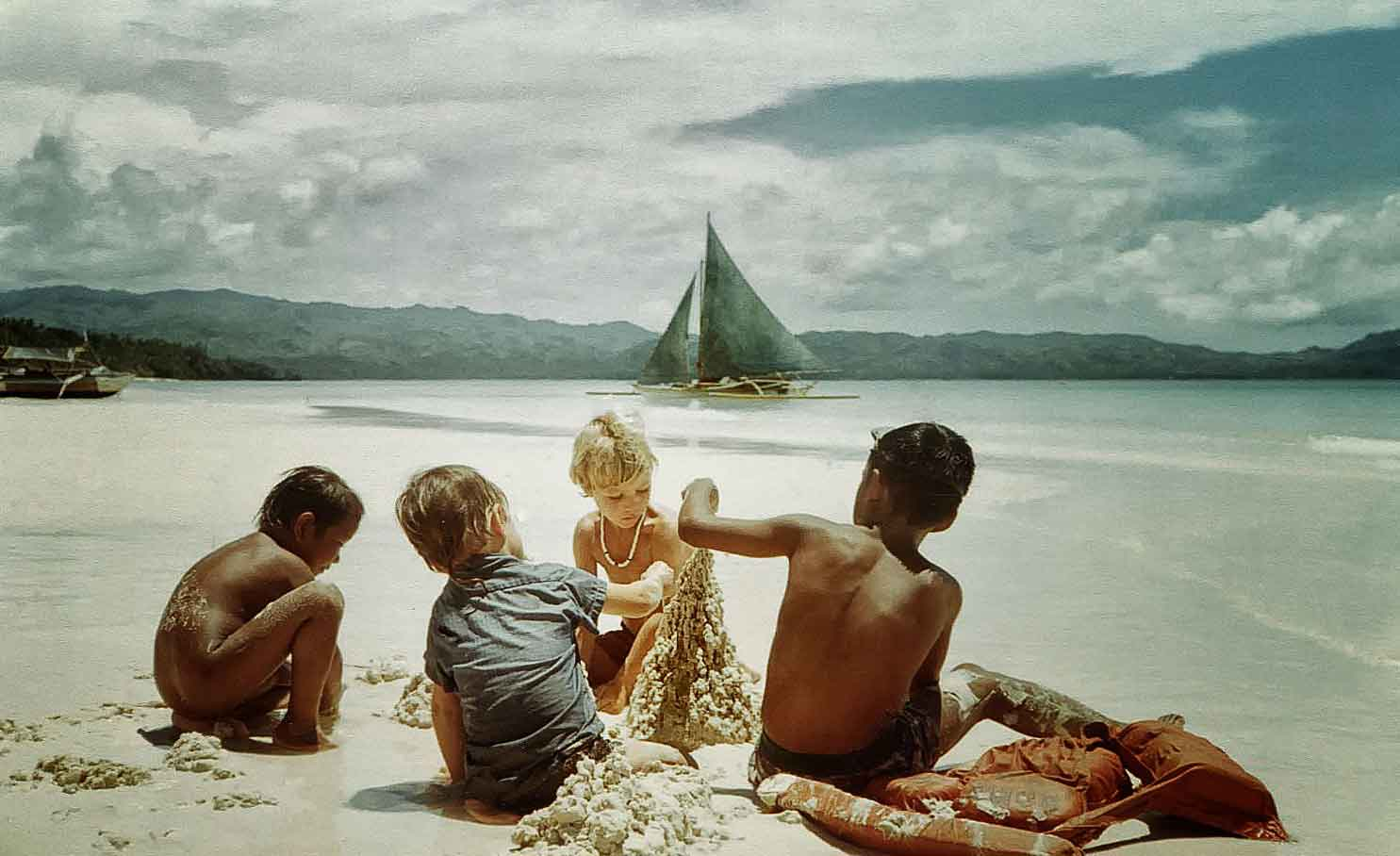
Tourists in Boracay, 1985

In the 1980s, the island became popular as a budget destination for backpackers. By the 1990s, Boracay's beaches were being acclaimed as the best in the world. However, in 1997, tourist arrivals to the resort island dropped 60 percent due to the increase of coliform bacteria from poor sewage and septic systems on the island.

==== Infrastructure development (Late 1990s) ====
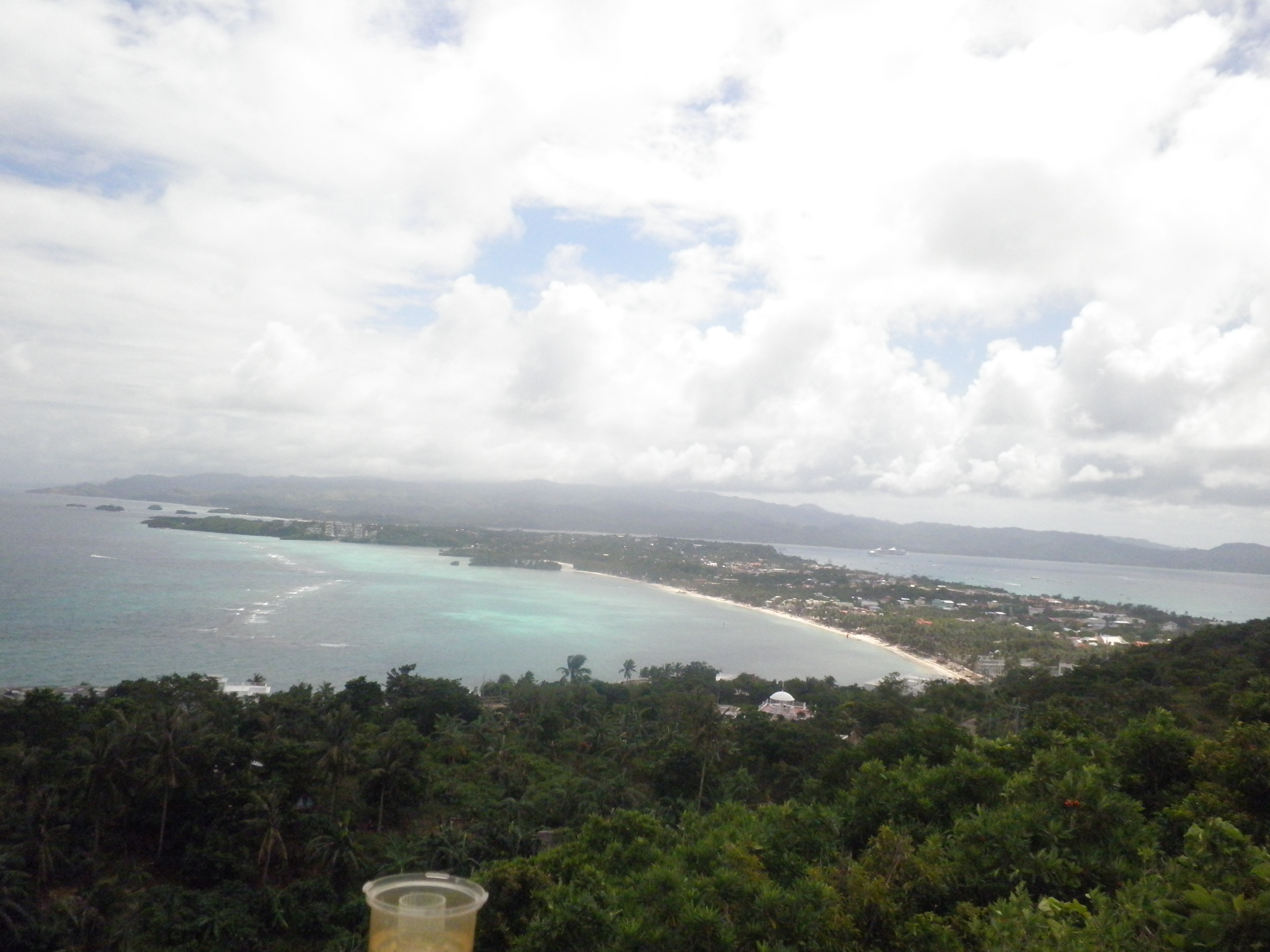
View of Boracay from Mount Luho, October 2012

The condition of Boracay in 1997 led to the installment of a potable water supply system, a sewage treatment plant and a solid waste disposal system, operated by the Philippine Tourism Authority (PTA). The connection of businesses and households to the system was not universal, and environmental problems persisted.

=== Contemporary history ===
==== Establishment of Tourism Zone ====
Then-president Gloria Macapagal Arroyo declared Boracay a Special Tourism Zone in 2005, and in April 2006 she gave the PTA administrative control over the island while mandating the agency to coordinate with the provincial government of Aklan.

In 2012, the Philippine Department of Tourism reported that Boracay had been named the world's second best beach after Providenciales in the Turks and Caicos Islands.

==== 2018 closure and rehabilitation ====
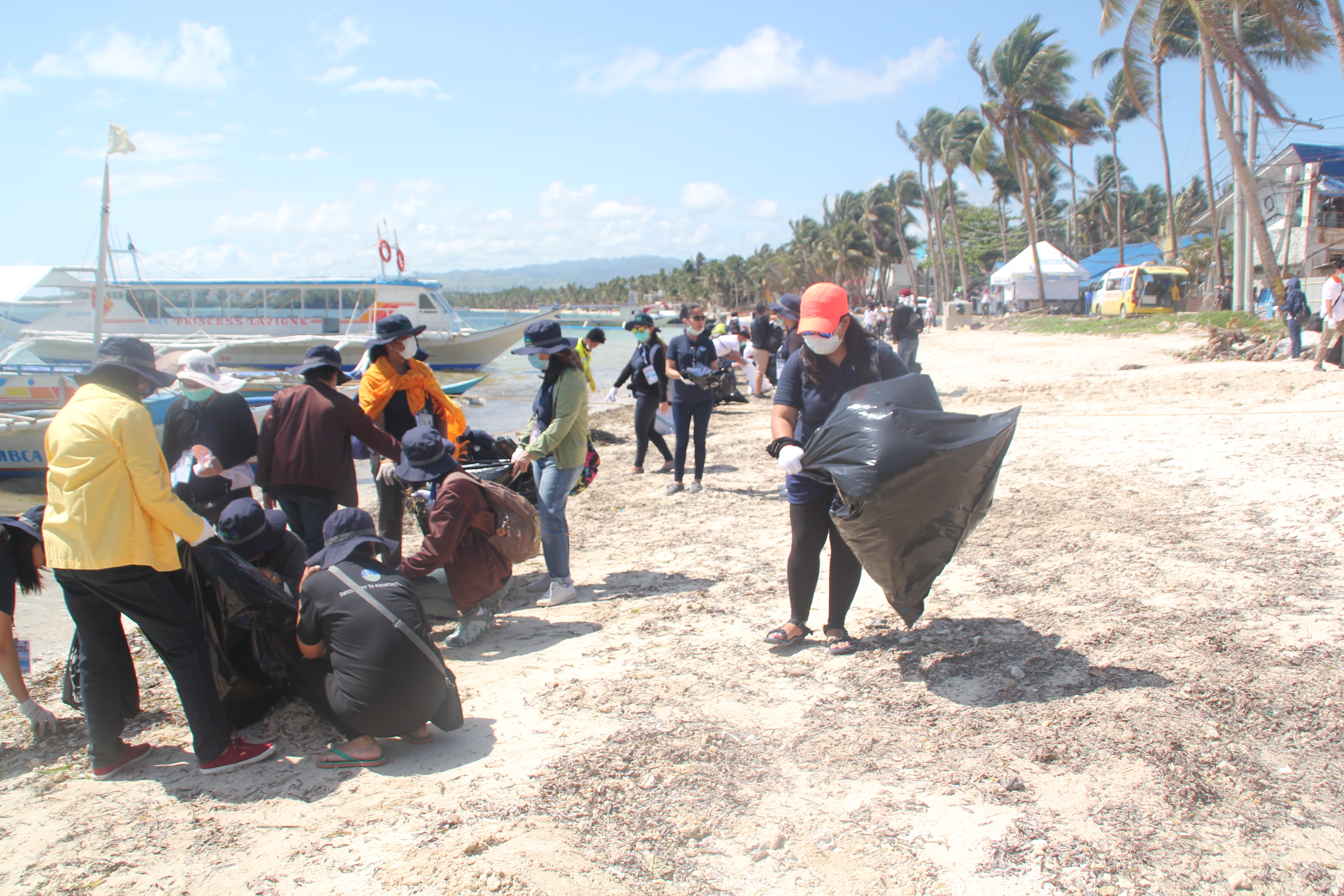
Cleanup of Boracay in 2018

Due to worsening environmental conditions in Boracay, President Rodrigo Duterte in February 2018 said he planned to close the resort island, which he described as a "cesspool", on April 26, 2018, instructing Environment and Natural Resources Secretary Roy Cimatu to resolve the issue. In a cabinet meeting, President Duterte approved the full closure of the island for six months, effective April 26, 2018, to rehabilitate and resolve the environmental issues surrounding Boracay. On May 30, 2018, President Duterte declared that he planned to make the entire Boracay a land reform area and wanted to first prioritize the island's residents.

In April 2018, the Philippine Army's 301st Infantry Brigade confirmed that 200 soldiers were deployed to Boracay to secure the island during its shutdown starting April 26.

On October 26, 2018, Boracay was reopened to the public with work on the island's infrastructure still in progress. In April 2019, numerous Chinese-owned businesses were opened in Boracay, and additionally, there are about 300 mainland Chinese residents. In April 2019, Labor Secretary Silvestre Bello III said that the Department of Labor and Employment has no control over foreign businesses setting up shop on the island, but that it vows to ensure that no Chinese national could take jobs fit for Filipinos.

Efforts to maintain the pristine condition of the beaches and the introduction of environmentally-friendly practices such as the use of biodegradable products and electric tricycles have significantly contributed to the island's recovery. The absence of plastic and a renewed focus on sustainability were key highlights of introduced in 2023.

Following the Boracay cleanup, Duterte distributed 623 certificates of land-ownership awards covering 274 hectares (680 acres) of land in Boracay and Aklan to the area's Ati inhabitants and other beneficiaries.

==== 2020 COVID-19 pandemic ====
The municipality of Malay, including Boracay island, was closed to tourism effective March 19, 2020, in response to the COVID-19 pandemic. The island would eventually be re-opened to tourists with COVID-19 protocols implemented as a cautionary measure.

==== Revocation of Ati Families’ CLOA ====
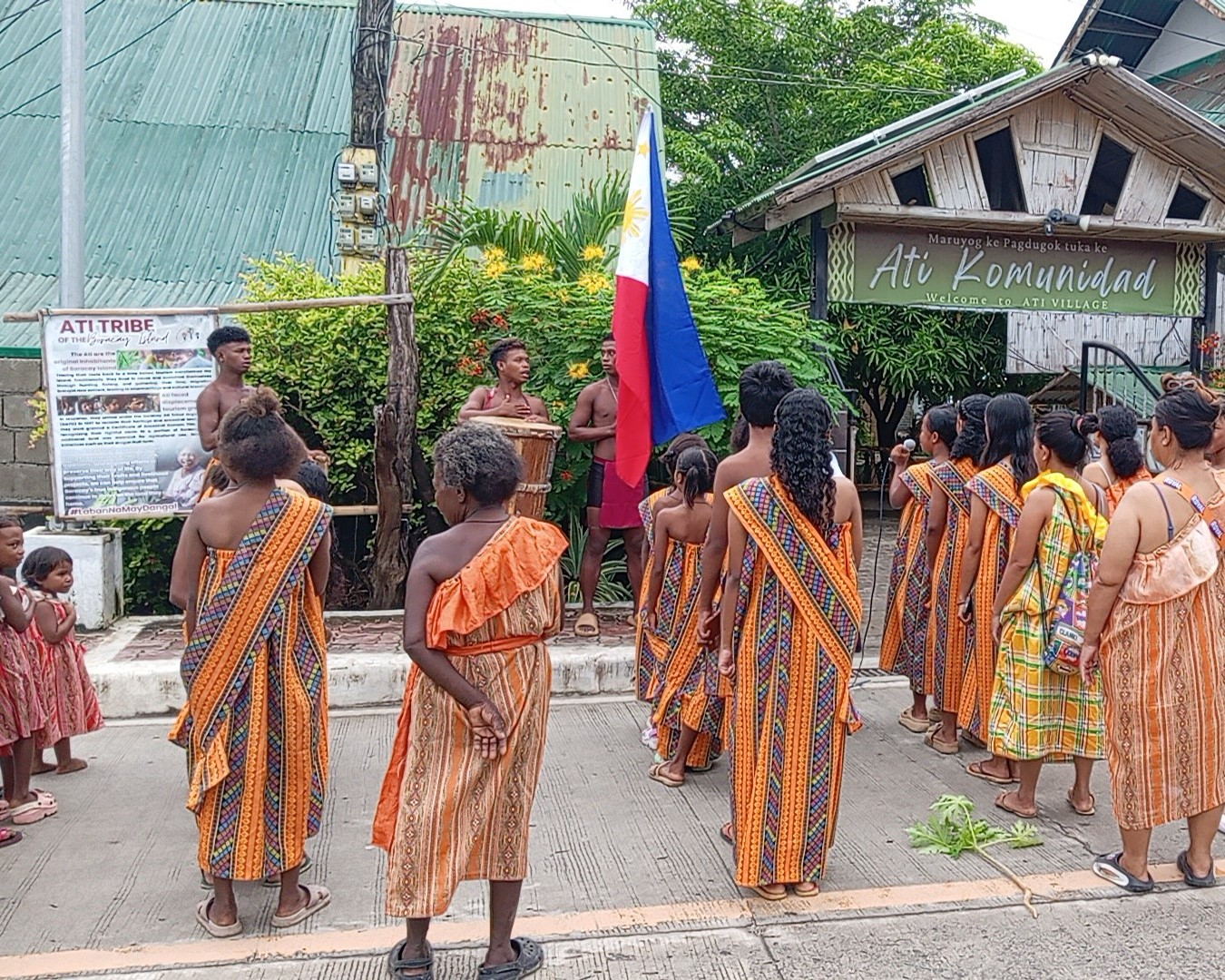
Ati Community in Ati Village, Boracay June 2025

Under the Bongbong Marcos administration in late March 2024, the Department of Agrarian Reform (DAR), upon the request of private land developers, cancelled the Certificates of Land Ownership Award (CLOA) of five lots in Boracay owned by Ati indigenous peoples. The lots, which were awarded by the Duterte administration to the Ati members in 2018, had been barricaded by armed men, who cited a March 5, 2024 decision by the DAR concluding that the land awarded was "not suitable for agriculture". The Boracay Ati Tribal Organization (BATO) later urged the Commission on Human Rights to intervene in the dispute, leading DAR Secretary Conrado Estrella III to order the distribution of land to the affected Ati members, albeit to a yet undisclosed location.

== Geography ==
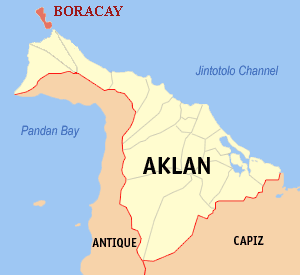
Location of Boracay in Aklan province of Panay Island

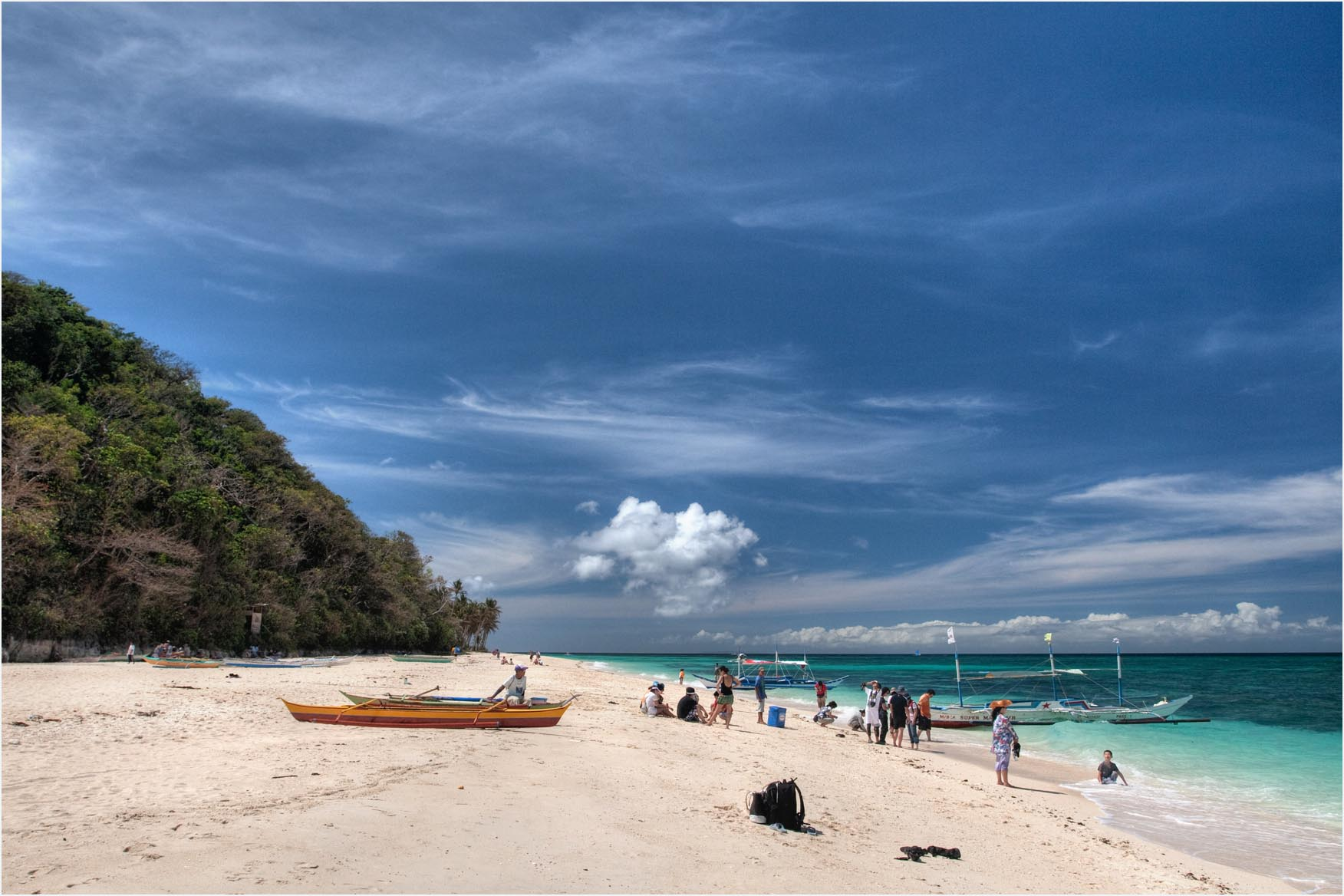
Puka Beach on the northern shore of Boracay

Boracay Island is located 0.8 kilometers (0.50 mi) off the northwest corner of the mainland Panay and belongs to the province of Aklan in the Western Visayas region, or Region VI, of the Philippines. It is 50 kilometers (31 mi) northwest of the provincial capital, Kalibo; 150 kilometres (93 mi) northwest of the regional capital, Iloilo City; and 200 nautical miles (370 km) southeast of the national capital, Manila. The island is approximately seven kilometers long, dog-bone shaped, with the narrowest spot being less than one kilometer wide, and has a total land area of 10.32 square kilometers (3.98 sq mi) and an approximate perimeter 23 kilometers (14.7 mi).

South-facing Cagban Beach is located across a small strait from the jetty port at Caticlan on Panay Island, and the Cagban jetty port serves as Boracay's main entry and exit point during most of the year. When wind and sea conditions dictate, east-facing Tambisaan Beach serves as an alternative entry and exit point. Boracay's two primary tourism beaches, White Beach and Bulabog Beach, are located on opposite sides of the island's narrow central area. White Beach faces westward and Bulabog Beach faces eastward. The island also has several other beaches.

White Beach, the main tourism beach, is about 4 kilometers (2.5 mi) long and is lined with resorts, hotels, lodging houses, restaurants, and other tourism-related businesses. In the central portion, for about two kilometers, there is a footpath known as the Beachfront Path separating the beach itself from the establishments located along it. North and south of the Beachfront Path, beachfront establishments do literally front along the beach itself. Several roads and paths connect the Beachfront Path with Boracay's Main Road, a vehicular road which runs the length of the island. At the extreme northern end of White Beach, a footpath runs around the headland there and connects White Beach with Diniwid Beach. (Note: Paving of the main road was begun in about 1997 and completed in several phases. As vehicular traffic increased, a multi-phase circumferential road project was begun. Phases 1 and 2 were completed in December 2020, covering 7.83 km (4.87 mi) of the 21.64 km (13.45 mi) project and including improvements to other existing roadways.)

Bulabog Beach, across the island from White Beach, is the second most popular tourism beach on the island and Boracay's main windsurfing and kiteboarding area.

Boracay is divided for land use and conservation purposes into 400 hectares (990 acres) reserved forestland and 628.96 hectares (1,554.2 acres) agricultural land.

=== Governance ===
The three barangays comprising Boracay island, Balabag, Manoc-Manoc, and Yapak, are part of the municipality of Malay in the province of Aklan.

=== Climate ===
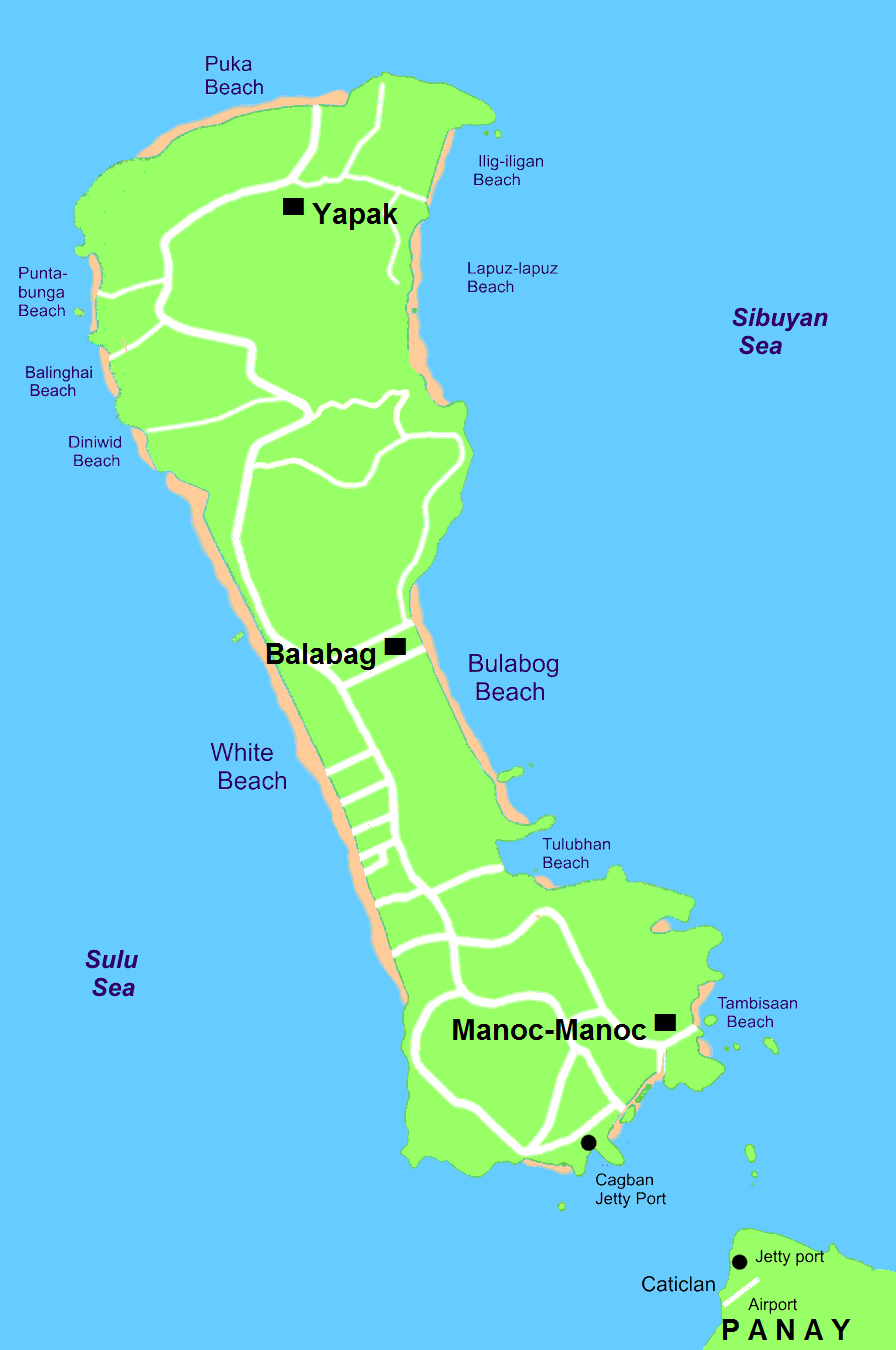
Map of Boracay Island.

Weather in Boracay is generally divided into two seasonal weather patterns known locally as the Amihan and Habagat seasons. In the Visayan language, Amihan means a cool northeast wind, and Habagat means west or southwest wind; southwest monsoon. The Amihan season is characterized by moderate temperatures, little or no rainfall, and a prevailing wind from the northeast. The Habagat season is characterized by hot and humid weather, frequent heavy rainfall, and a prevailing wind from the west.

On Boracay, the main indicator of the switch between the Amihan and Habagat seasonal patterns is the switch in wind direction. In most years this transition is abrupt and occurs overnight. In some years there is a period of perhaps a week or two where the wind will switch between Amihan and Habagat patterns several times before settling into the pattern for the new season. As a rule of thumb, Boracay will be in the Amihan weather pattern from sometime in October to sometime in March and in the Habagat weather pattern for the remainder of the year.

Temperatures in Malay municipality province generally ranged between 25 and 30 °C (77 and 86 °F) in 2009–2019, with a low of 24 °C (75 °F) in February 2014 and high of 31 °C (88 °F) in October 2018, ranging more widely in 2019, with a low of 23 °C (73 °F) in March and a high of 33 °C (91 °F) in May. During Tropical storm periods, temperatures can fall below 30 °C (86 °F). Tropical storms can impact Boracay at any time of year, but are most likely to be seen during the Habagat season.

== Environment ==
=== Fauna ===
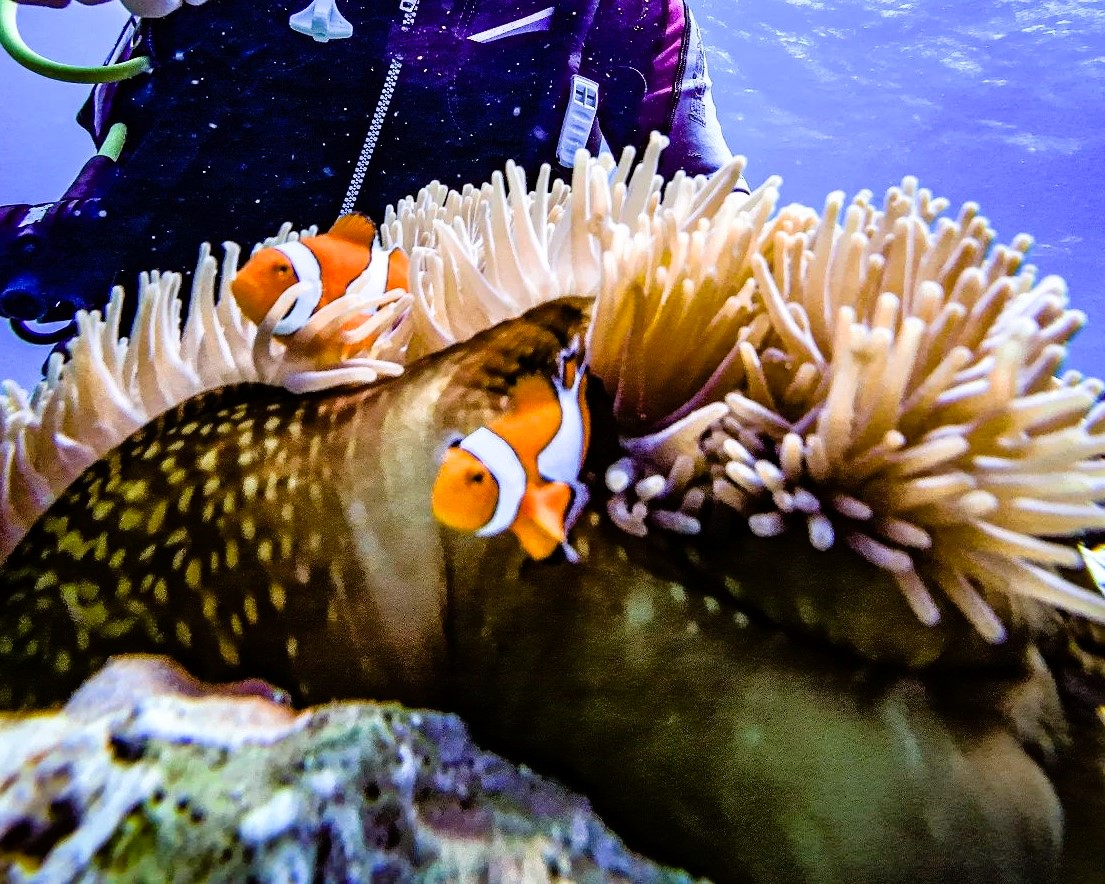
Clownfish in Anemones in the Waters Near Boracay Island

At least three species of flying foxes have been recorded to inhabit Boracay namely the giant golden-crowned flying fox (Aceradon jubatus), the giant fruit bat (Pteropus vampyrus), and the small flying fox (Pteropus hypomelanus). Their population is concentrated on the northern side of the island in Barangay Yapak, where the hunting of bats was made illegal through a local ordinance.

According to the Coastal Ecosystem Conservation and Adaptive Management (CECAM), a study led by the Japan International Cooperation Agency conducted from 2010 to 2015 noted a 70.5 percent decrease of Boracay's coral cover from 1988 to 2011. The study attributed the increased drop in coral cover from 2008 to 2011 to the 38.4 percent increase of tourist arrivals combined with poorly monitored snorkeling activity in coral-rich areas. The Boracay Foundation Inc. (BFI) made efforts to remedy the situation by launching a "refurbishment" program for the corals. In 2017, the BFI claimed the number of corals in Boracay increased from 15 to 20 percent since 2015 due to its project.

=== Sanitation ===
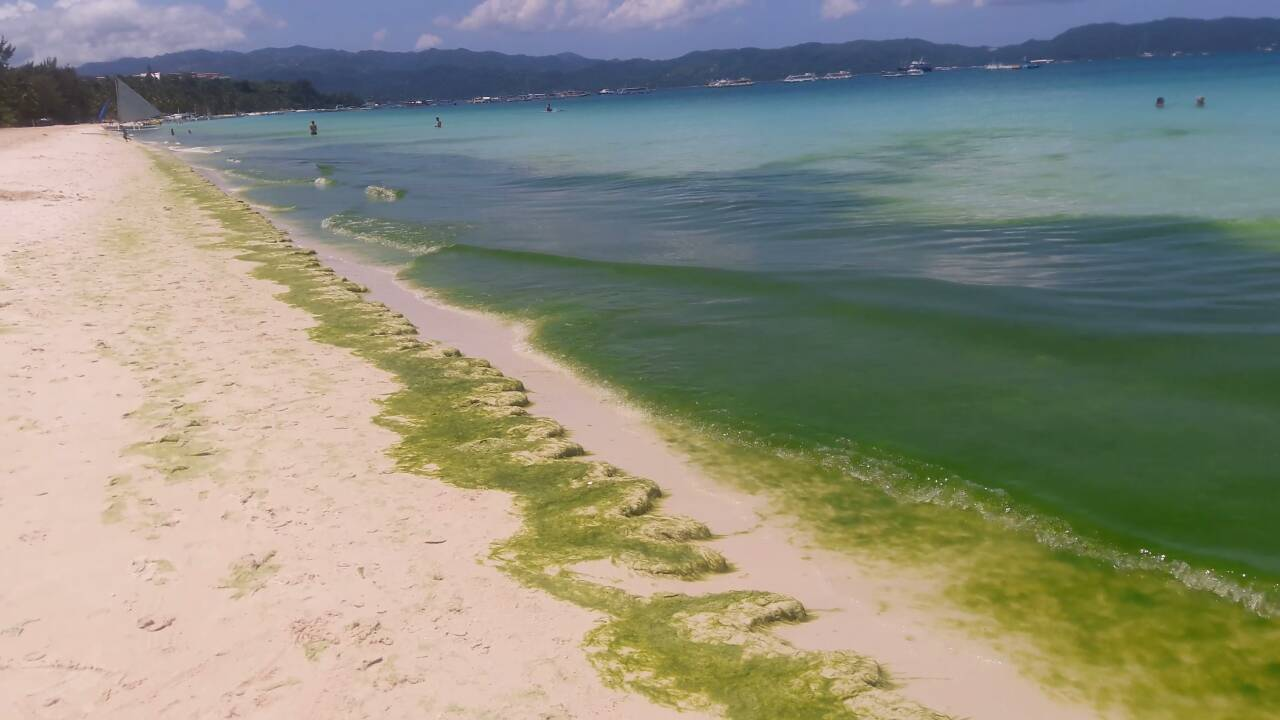
Algal bloom in Boracay on April 25, 2018, a day prior to the island's closure

Boracay has been experiencing an increased coliform bacteria population since the 1990s, which contributed to a 60 percent decline in tourist arrivals in 1997. Although a potable water supply system, a solid waste disposal system, as well as a sewage treatment plant which began operation in 2003 were installed to remedy the insufficient sewage and septic conditions in the island, environmental concerns regarding coliform bacteria persisted due to noncompliance of some business establishments in the island.

In 2004, only 51 percent of hotels and restaurants in Boracay and 25 percent of all households were connected to the island's central sewage system. In 2005, Boracay was declared a "special tourism zone". In April 2006, Arroyo gave the PTA administrative control over Boracay, to be exercised in coordination with the provincial government. In 2009, Boracay Island Water Co. (BIWC), won a contract to improve the supply of potable water and install an efficient sewerage system.

Boracay has experienced abnormally high algae growth since February 2015, due to sewage being dumped into the waters surrounding the islands. In early 2018, 50 to 60 percent of all establishments in Boracay were compliant to the Clean Water Act of 2004 according to the Department of Environment and Natural Resources.

== Tourism ==
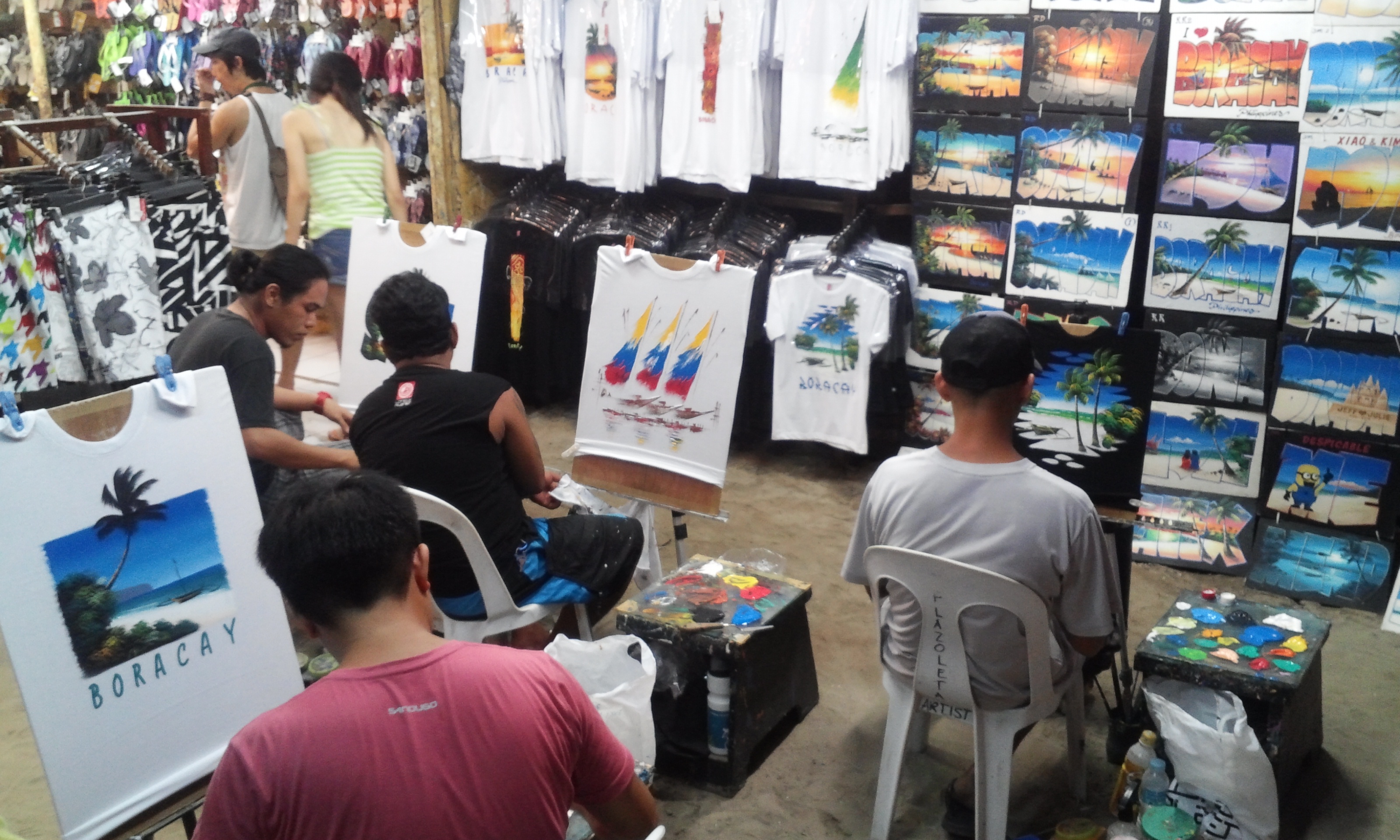
A t-shirt shop in Boracay selling hand-made clothing featuring the island

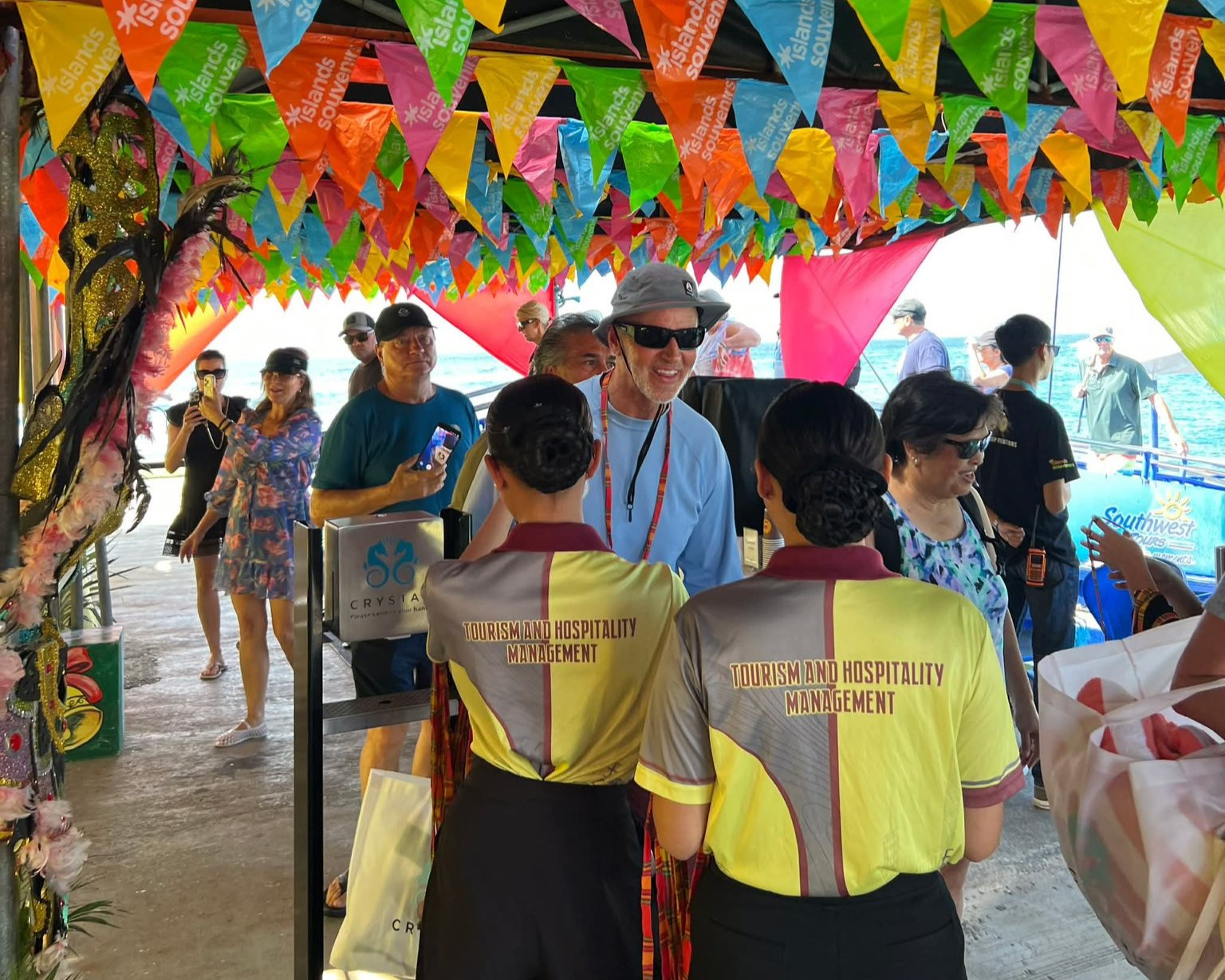
Tourist arriving from visiting cruise ship March 11 2026

Partly because of its wind and weather patterns, tourism in Boracay is at its peak during the amihan season (which generally starts around the Christmas season and runs through February). During amihan, the prevailing wind blows from the east. Boracay's main tourism area, White Beach, is on the western side of the island and is sheltered from the wind. During the Amihan season, the water off White Beach is often glassy-smooth. On the eastern side of the island, hills on the northern and southern ends of the island channel the Amihan season wind from the east onshore, onto Bulabog Beach in the central part of the island's eastern side. This makes the reef-protected waters off that beach relatively safe and ideal for scuba diving, windsurfing, and kiteboarding / kitesurfing.

In June 2011, it was reported that Megaworld Corporation, a real estate development group led by Andrew Tan had earmarked ₱20 billion to develop tourism estates in Boracay and Cavite. The planned Boracay project, Boracay Newcoast, involves four hotels with 1,500 rooms, a plaza and an entertainment center.

Other resorts in Boracay include Discovery Shores, a luxury five-star resort managed by a Filipino hospitality group called The Discovery Leisure Company Inc. and owned by Discovery World Corp. The building, with 88 suites, a spa, and four restaurants and bars, stands at Station One on the White Beach, and has been described as "more Miami chic than hidden oasis."

The island has the highest density of merchants that accept bitcoin outside of El Salvador. There is a movement to dub the island "Bitcoin Island" and bootstrap a circular economy similar to Bitcoin Beach.

=== Leisure and Recreational activities ===
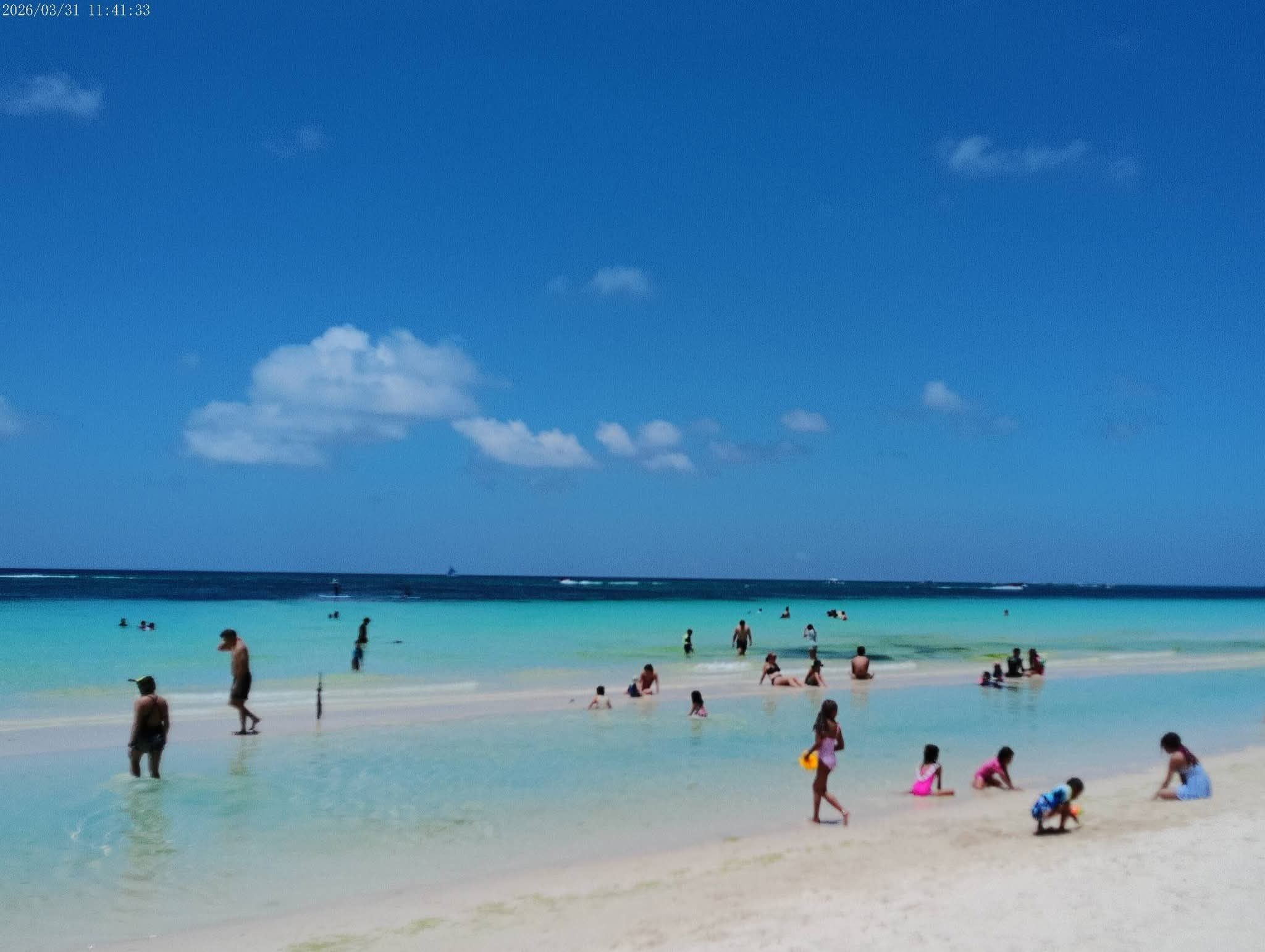
Children playing in the clear, shallow waters in December.

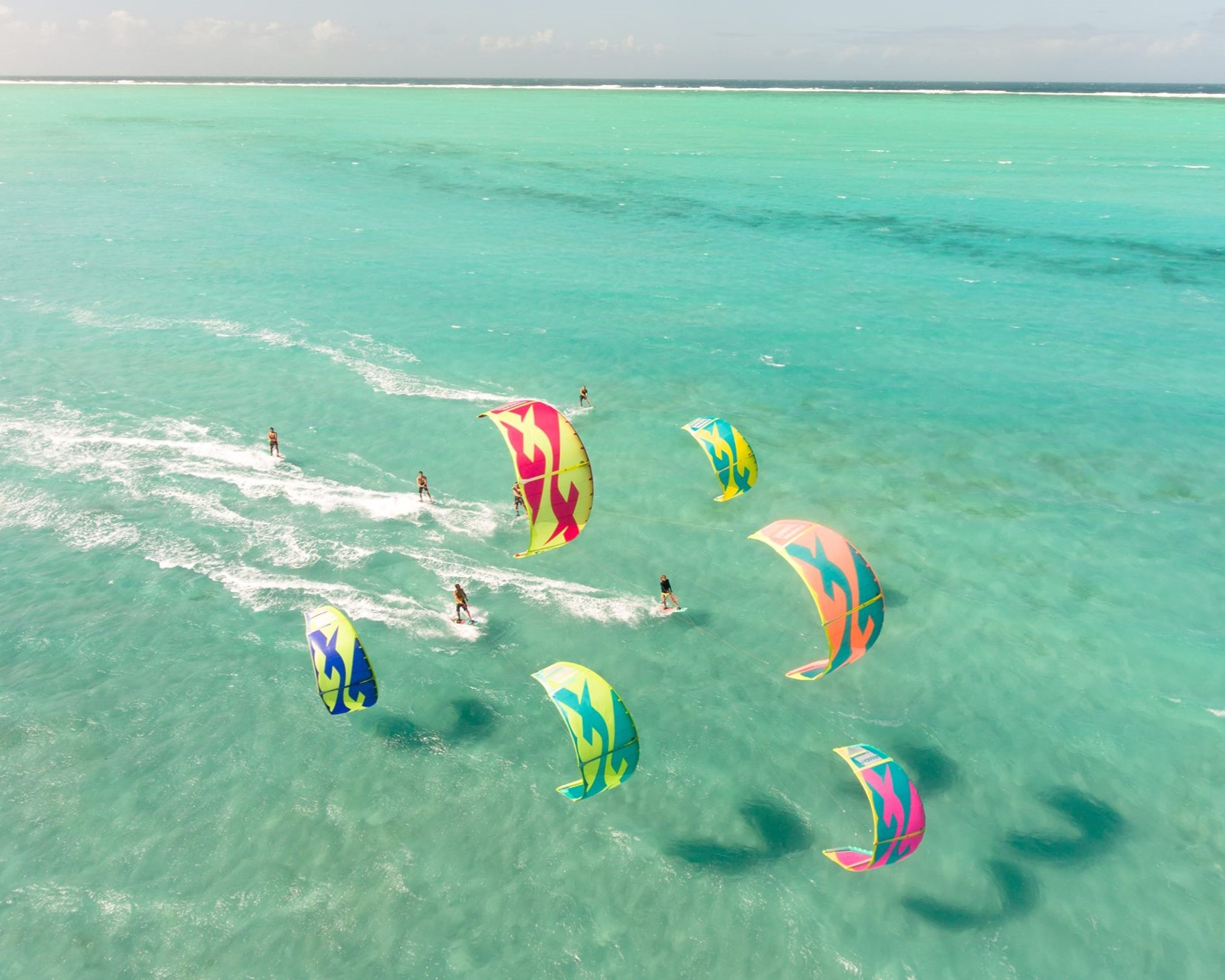
A Kite Surfing School in Boracay

Leisure activities available on or near Boracay include horseback riding, scuba diving, helmet diving, snorkeling, windsurfing, kiteboarding, cliff diving, parasailing and banana boat.

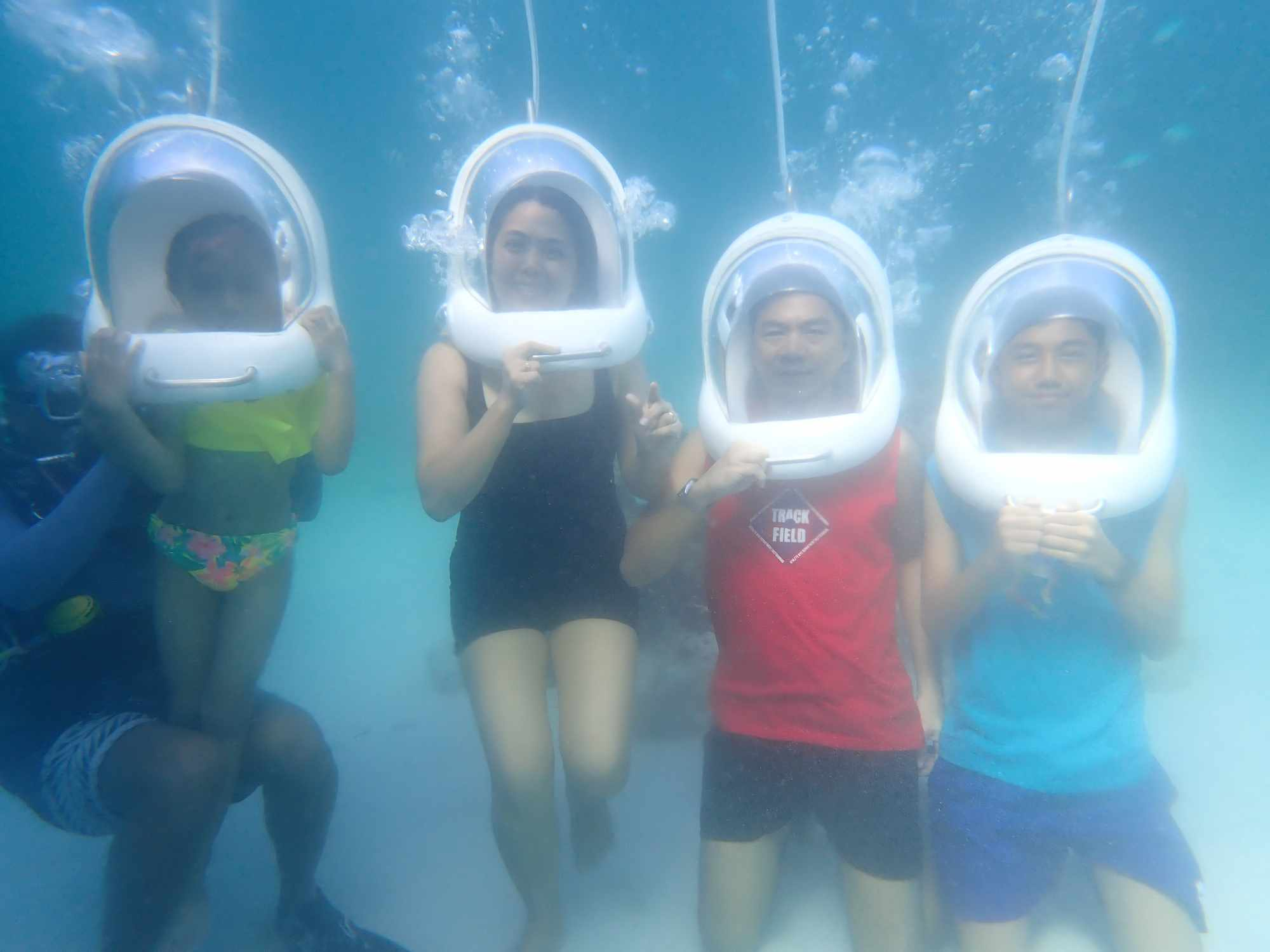
Marine world being explored by a local tourist family in Boracay, June 2024

Boracay is the site of an 18-hole par 72 golf course designed by Graham Marsh.

=== Statistics ===
According to the Malay Tourism office, they recorded 2,155,217 tourist arrivals to Boracay in 2025, a slight increase from 2024, which was 2,077,977 tourists. The Malay Tourism Office is aiming for 2.3 million tourist arrivals for 2026.

=== Marhaba Boracay ===
In September 2024, tourism secretary Christina Frasco launched Megaworld's 850 m^{2} (9,100 sq ft) Marhaba, a halal tourism cove in the Boracay Newcoast private beach in front of “Lapus-Lapus” rock formation.

== Sports ==
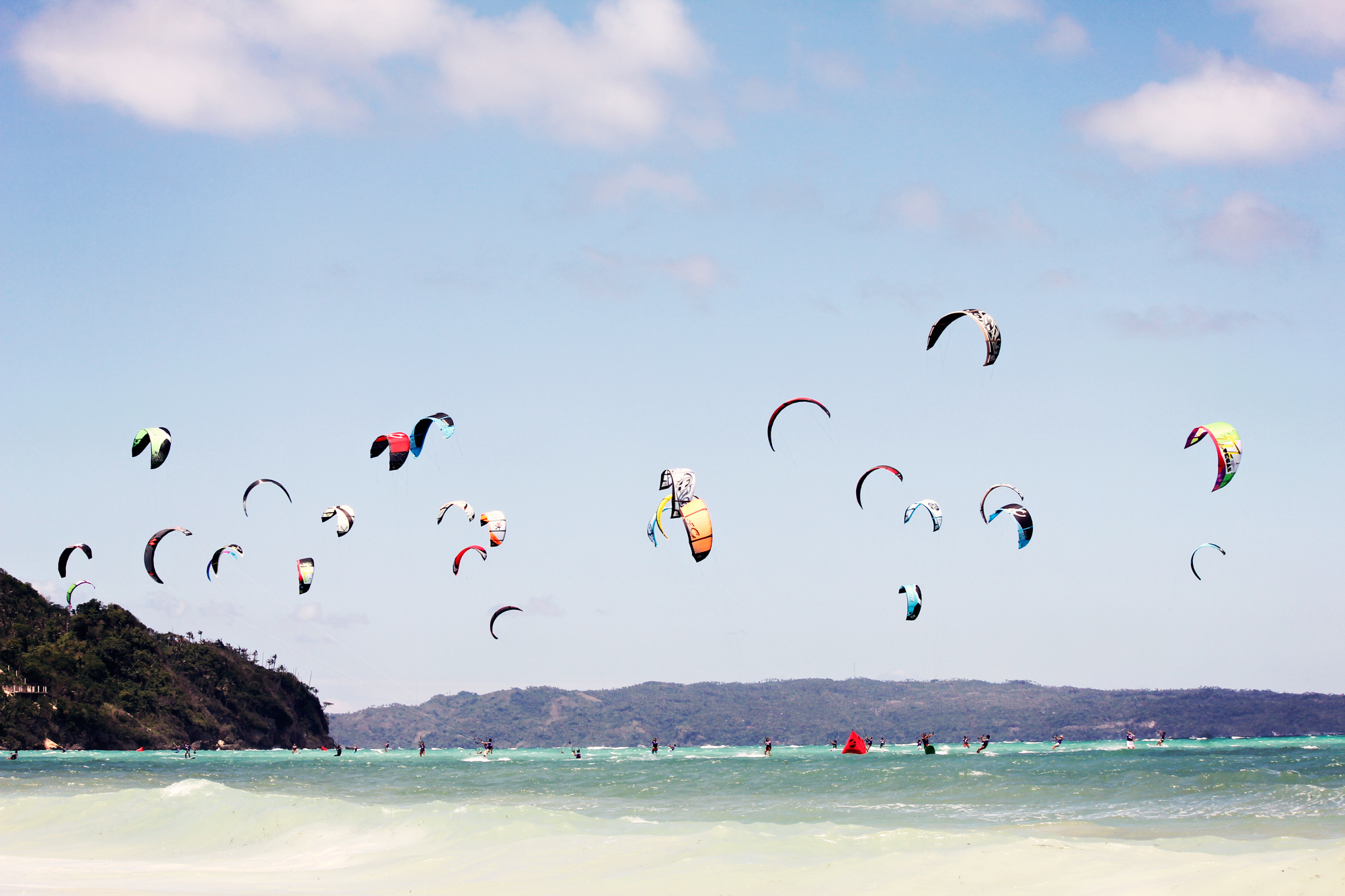
Kite surfers in Boracay.

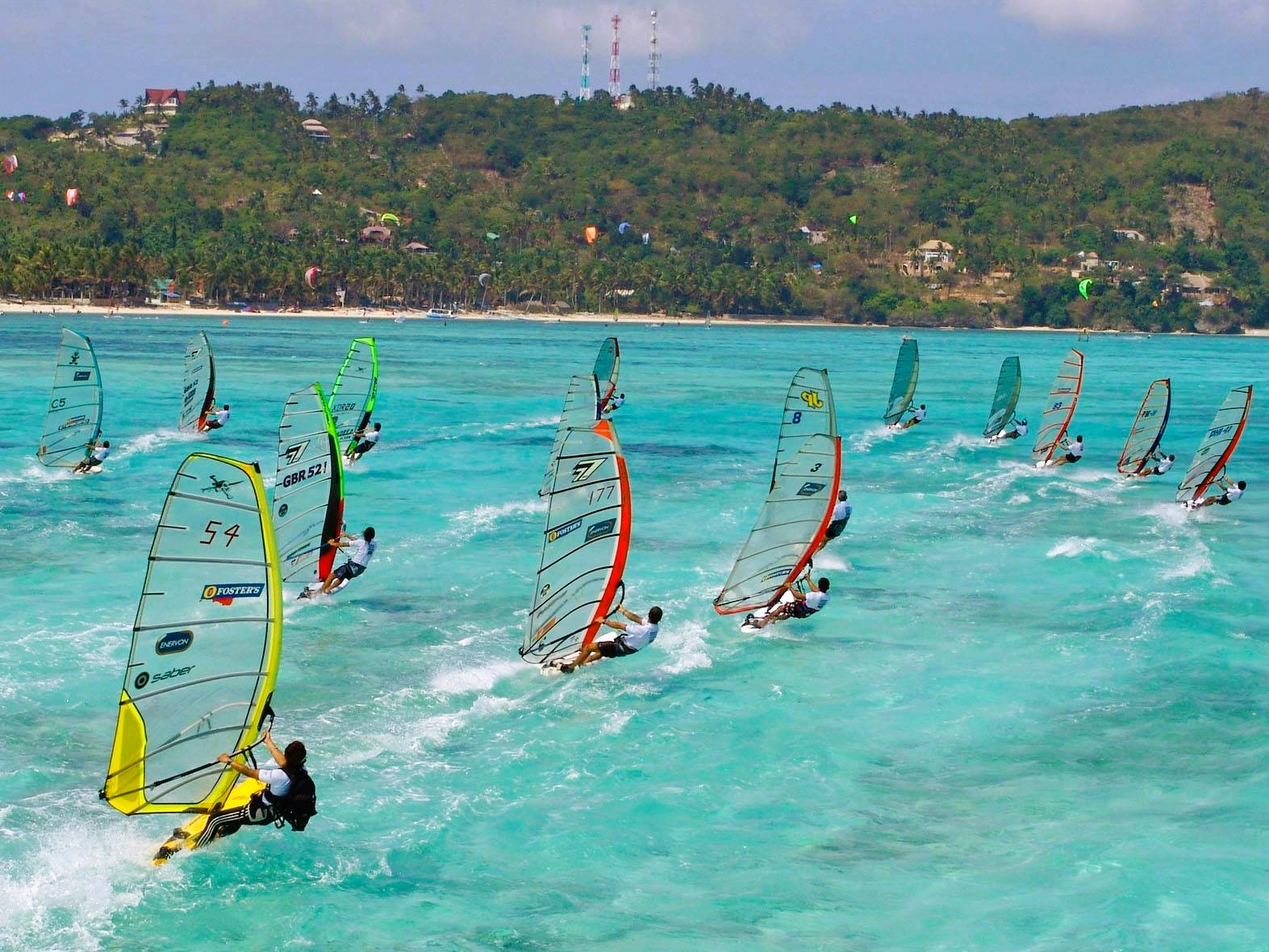
Windsurfers at the Boracay International Funboard Cup

Boracay has been a competitive venue for the Asian Windsurfing Tour, with the week-long Boracay International Funboard Cup competition usually held in January on Bulabog Beach. In 2010, the 2011 event dates were scheduled as January 24 – 29. CNNGo, a division of CNN focused on travel/lifestyle/entertainment, selected the Boracay International Funboard Competition on the weekend of January 22–24 as one of its 52 weekend recommendations for 2010.

Dragon boat races are held annually in Boracay under the auspices of the Philippine Dragon Boat Federation, with teams coming from around the Philippines and from other Asian nations to compete. The races usually take place sometime in April or May. The 2012 Boracay Edition of the PDBF International Club Crew Challenge was scheduled for April 26–28, 2012.

The Boracay Open Asian Beach Ultimate Tournament, an ultimate frisbee event, with players coming from around the Philippines and from other international nations, has been held annually since 2003, usually in March or April.

=== Asian Games Centennial Festival ===
Boracay was scheduled to host a special multi-sport event in 2013. At its 31st General Assembly in Macau, the Olympic Council of Asia (OCA) decided to create the Asian Games Centennial Festival in celebration of the 100th anniversary of the Oriental Games (later Far Eastern Championship Games). The OCA awarded the hosting rights to the Philippines as it had been the host of the first Far Eastern Championship Games held in Manila 100 years earlier. The festival was to be held on Boracay in November 2013. However, it had to be rescheduled and relocated because of Typhoon Haiyan, with the ceremony eventually taking place at the Sofitel Plaza in Manila on January 17, 2014. The 32nd OCA General Assembly was to be held in conjunction with the games.

== Culture ==
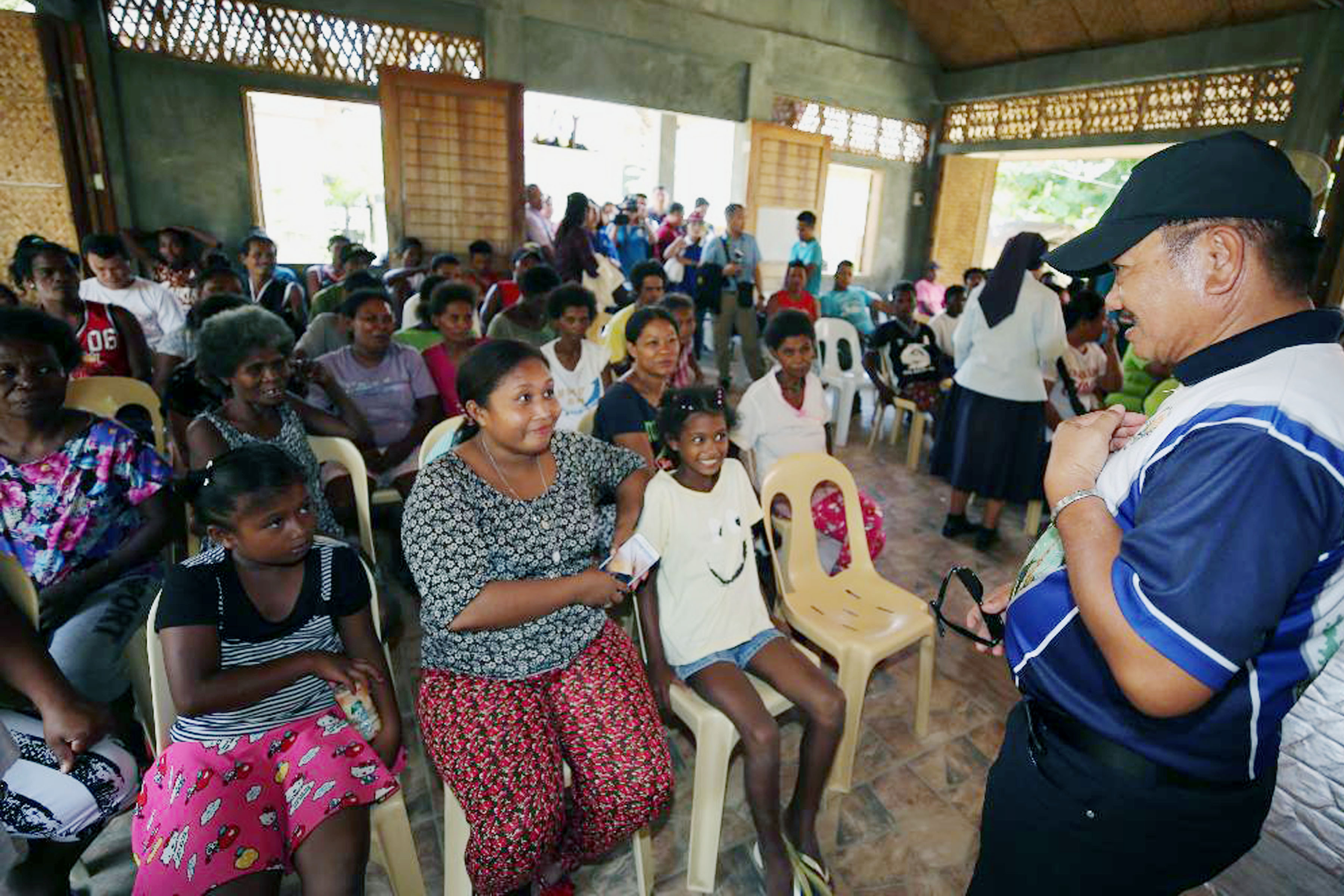
The Ati community in Boracay

The first settlers of Boracay were a Negrito people called the Ati, and who spoke a distinctive Philippine language called Inati. Later settlers brought other languages to the island, including Aklanon (as Boracay is part of Aklan province), Hiligaynon (Ilonggo), Kinaray-a, Capiznon, other Visayan languages, Filipino, and English.

The well-known Ati-Atihan Festival takes place each January in Kalibo on nearby Panay Island. A much smaller Ati-Atihan festival is celebrated in Boracay, usually in the second or third week of January.

== Transportation ==
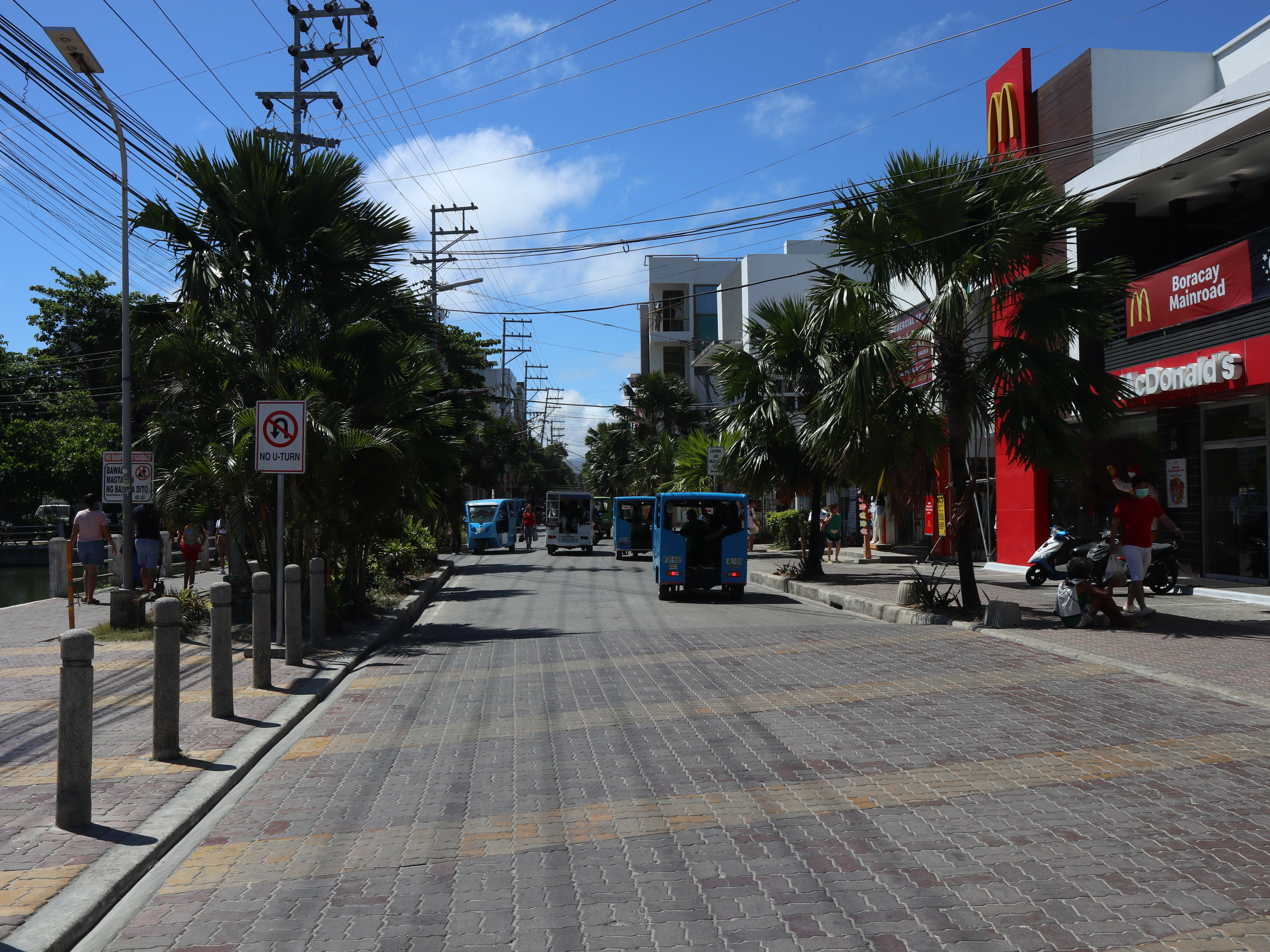
Boracay Main Road in 2024

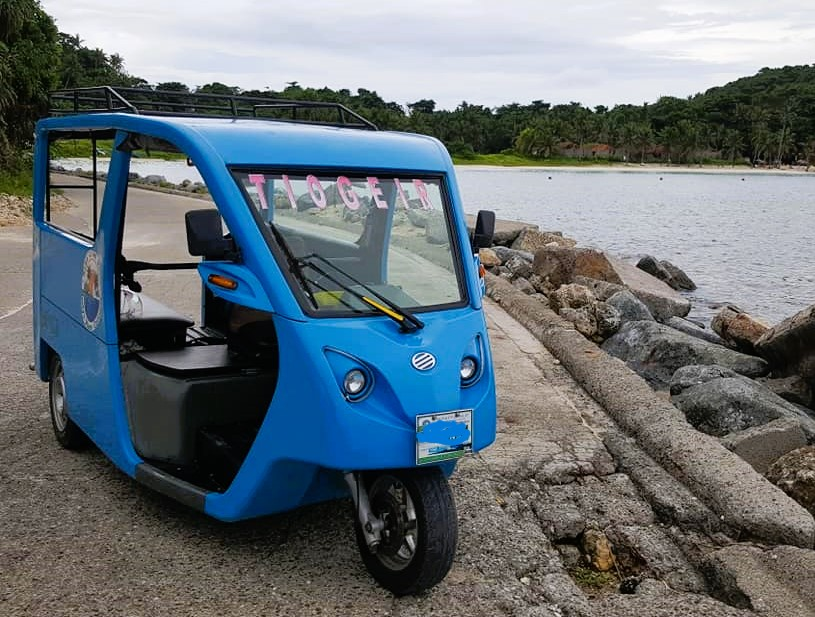
Boracay E-Trike: The Island's Major Eco-Friendly Commuter Transportation

Boracay Island is separated from Panay Island by a narrow strait. The island is located opposite the barangay of Caticlan in the municipality of Malay, Aklan. Transportation across the strait is provided by boats operating from the Caticlan jetty port. Cagban Port serves as the primary sea transportation hub for passengers going into Boracay but the island lacks any formal seaport for cargo transport and waste disposal. Goods are delivered into Boracay through an informal port near the Cagban Port.

Boracay is served by two airports in Aklan: the Kalibo International Airport and Godofredo P. Ramos Airport (commonly referred to as Caticlan airport or Boracay airport).

The three main modes of transport are via motor-tricycles and electric-tricycles (e-trikes) along the main road, or by walking along the beaches. Pedicabs, known as sikads, are also available along the Beachfront Path. Other means of transportation include mountain bikes, quadbikes and motorbikes, all of which can be rented. It was reported in October 2018 that the island will see modern jeepneys, solar-powered shuttles, and hop-on hop-off buses serviced by Grab, and that the Department of Energy will donate 200 e-trikes to the Malay local government under a ₱1.73 billion project funded by the Asian Development Bank.

As of 2018, the municipal government of Malay was encouraging motorcycle operators to transition to e-trikes in their coordinated efforts to promote environment-friendly public transportation. Diesel-motor tricycles are expected to be phased out by August 2018.

In 2019, San Miguel Corporation proposed a 1.2-kilometre (0.75 mi) limited-access bridge to connect the island of Boracay to the mainland of Panay. On March 25, 2026, DPWH Secretary Vivencio Dizon issued the Notice of Award to SMHC for the financing, design, construction, operation, and maintenance of the bridge. Upon completion, travel time between Iloilo City and Boracay will be reduced to 2.5 hours from the current 6 to 7 hours through the bridge and the Iloilo–Capiz–Aklan Expressway, both of which are part of the DPWH's PPP infrastructure projects.

== See also ==
- Tourism in the Philippines
- Pinoy Big Brother
