= 2018 Boracay closure and redevelopment =

Environmental rehabilitation of the Philippine resort island

2018 Boracay closure
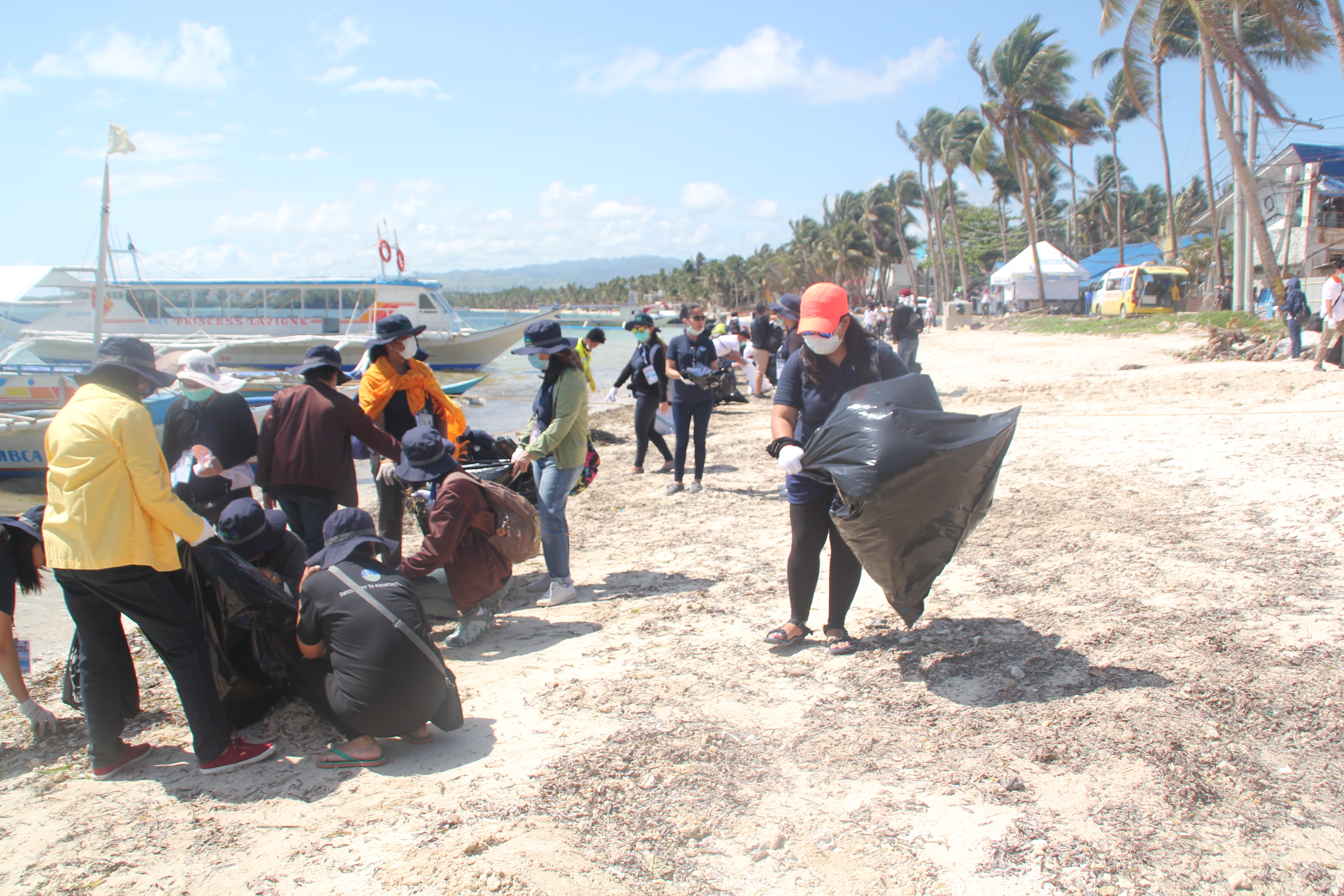
- Volunteers from the DENR Region 6 conducting a cleanup in Bulabog Beach. April 26, 2018.
- Date: April 26 – October 26, 2018
- Duration: 6 months
- Location: Boracay, Malay, Aklan, Philippines
- Type: Closure / rehabilitation
- Cause: Violations of building and sewerage regulations by business establishments, deteriorating environmental conditions

On April 26, 2018, the Philippine resort island of Boracay, one of the country's major tourist destinations, was temporarily closed to the general public as part of the Philippine government's efforts to rehabilitate and redevelop the island. As part of the closure, Boracay was closed for six months except to its registered residents and employees. The closure had a significant effect on the livelihood of local people. In 2022, the Philippine government declared that the closure was successful in rehabilitating the island's environment.

== Background ==
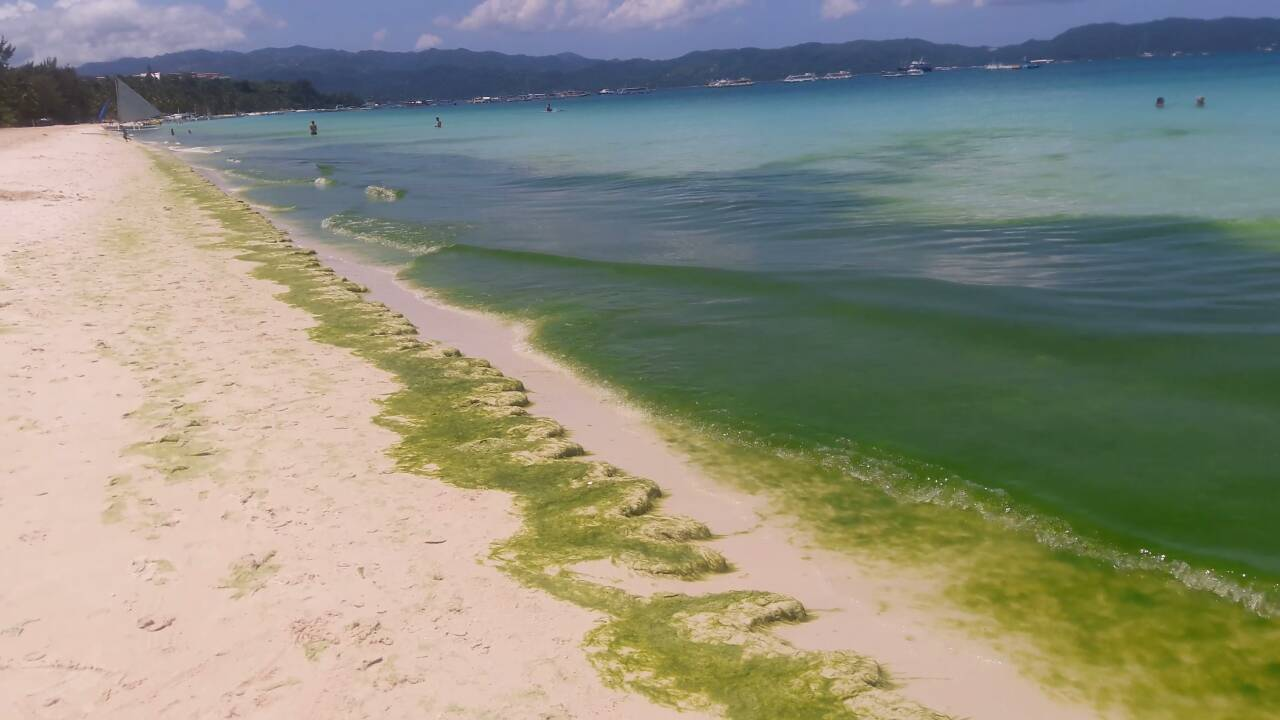
Algal bloom in Boracay on April 25, 2018, a day prior to the resort island's closure.

Boracay is a popular tourist island and the infrastructure needed to accommodate tourism was put in place at a fast pace. This caused environmental problems. Condé Nast Traveler magazine called Boracay "the poster child for overtourism". In particular, many businesses were discharging untreated sewer waste into the sea. The magazine quoted a tour operator who said the environmental problems on the island are '"the worst example of how to destroy a beautiful island"'. The amount of rubbish generated per person was said to be more than three times that in Manila.

In a business forum held on February 9, 2018, President Rodrigo Duterte called the island of Boracay a "cesspool" and announced plans to close the island to tourists and conduct a rehabilitation on the island in June 2018 to resolve the worsening sewage conditions there. Duterte directed Environment secretary Roy Cimatu to resolve the environmental issues in the island. Boracay is part of the jurisdiction of the town of Malay of Aklan province. Three of Malay's barangays are in Boracay.

According to the Western Visayas regional office of the Department of Tourism, Boracay had two million tourists in 2017 which accounts for 34 percent of Western Visayas' 5.8 million tourist arrivals. At least 19,031 are employed to work on the island.

The Department of Environment and Natural Resources (DENR) Ecosystems Research and Development Bureau, together with the University of the Philippines at Los Baños, Laguna, had earlier commissioned a study to compute Boracay's "real carrying capacity". The study took into account Boracay land area, hours spent on activities on the island and other environmental factors. According to the study, Boracay can accommodate a total of 54,945 people at a time, broken down into 19,215 tourists and 35,730 residents, which includes 22,395 stay-in workers. However, Boracay's existing population of more than 70,700 had already exceeded the carrying capacity by almost 30%. Given the excess one-third capacity, the DENR is looking to relocate some 6,000 workers to the mainland Malay town in Aklan. DENR is also exploring the option of having hotels and establishments subsidize the living and transport expenses or to house their own workers. Other alternatives includes the provision of a new port for workers and permanent residents to avoid congestion in the existing one, which will be ring-fenced for tourist use.

Waters along the beaches of Boracay have experienced algal bloom which environmentalists and some long-time residents claim to be an indicator of pollution and deteriorating water conditions. The Malay municipal government, some business operators, and some residents say that the algal bloom is a natural seasonal phenomenon that usually occurs annually in the summer, and occurred on Boracay even before the island became developed.

Boracay Island Water Co. operates the sewage network of Boracay which accommodates only 61 percent of the island. In 2018, 195 businesses, and almost four thousand households, were not connected to the sewers. The island has two central sewerage treatment plants with a total capacity of 11.5 million liters/day, one in Barangay Balabag and another in Barangay Manoc-Manoc, and plans the construction of a third plant in Barangay Yapak with a capacity of 5 million litres/day. The company has also carried out some work to ensure the facilities can be used fully; before this, only 58% of capacity was used.

== Events leading to the closure ==
Following Rodrigo Duterte's comment on the situation in Boracay, the local government of Malay issued a statement on February 19, 2018, accepting the remarks by the president as "constructive criticism" and acknowledged the environmental issues affecting the island. It pointed out that the municipal government had entered into a partnership with an architectural firm, Palafox Associates, to formulate a tourism municipal master plan which involved decongesting Boracay and implementing building regulations in the island. In addition it criticized ABS-CBN and GMA Network for using photos of algal bloom in the island to "sensationalize" the algal phenomenon in the island which it says is natural and only occurs in the summer.

There were repeat calls for a partial closure of Boracay instead of a total closure. 1-Pacman partylist has proposed the closure of areas identified as medium to high risk based primarily on environmental and sanitary standards while low risk areas continue to operate while the rest of the island is rehabilitated.

The Philippine Army was deployed to secure Boracay during its closure as support to the local police. Protest actions were the "foremost threat" the security forces were stated to be anticipating.

There was some criticism of the planned closure, with some people thinking that the government was taking action not for environmental reasons but to destroy smaller businesses. There was also criticism of the lack of notice and the limited aid package.

=== Planned media coverage restriction ===
The Department of the Interior and Local Government (DILG) announced that journalists would need permission to cover the shutdown of Boracay. On April 14, 2018, the Department of Tourism of the Philippines issued guidelines that sought to limit media coverage of the Boracay shutdown. According to the media accreditation guidelines, television networks would be limited to 12 persons, while radio, print, and online organizations and wire services would be limited to five persons. Accredited organizations would be allowed on the island from 8 a.m. to 5 p.m., restricted to designated areas, and would have to be escorted. "Vetting and processing" of applications for accreditation would take three to five working days.

The Center for Media Freedom and Responsibility (CMFR) noted criticisms that saw the guidelines "as government’s way to prevent access to critical media, selectively favoring the media practitioners who are friendly to government." The National Union of Journalists of the Philippines called the restrictions unconstitutional. The CMFR said the accreditation system was a form of prior restraint, and noted a wider pattern of restrictions that sought to limit press freedom in the Philippines.

On April 25, 2018, the Department of Tourism announced that it was dropping the requirement for accreditation for media coverage.

== Closure and rehabilitation ==
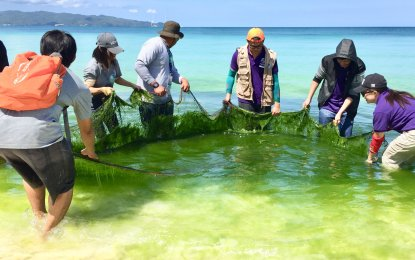
Cleanup of algae in Boracay

On April 4, 2018, the Philippine government announced that Boracay would be closed for up to six months starting on April 26. Checkpoints staffed by police officers and soldiers would be set up at piers in Boracay to turn away visitors from the island. Passes would be given to local residents.

On the day of the closure, President Rodrigo Duterte declared a state of calamity over the three barangays of Boracay.

The Department of Social Welfare and Development (DSWD) distributed relief goods to residents of Boracay while the island is closed to tourists. In June 2018, there were reports of residents receiving spoiled canned goods. The DSWD has admitted mishandling the relief efforts, apologized, and said they would investigate the matter.

Within the same month, a whale shark sighting was reported in Boracay through social media. Social media users mostly from Aklan hailed the sightings as a good sign. The government's presidential spokesperson Harry Roque said that the sighting is a proof that the rehabilitation is a success. Greenpeace however responded that the whale shark sighting is not an indicator of success of the cleanup efforts, pointing out that whale sharks are migratory creatures and that sightings are a normal occurrence in Boracay. It criticized the government for using the sighting as a metric for the rehabilitation.

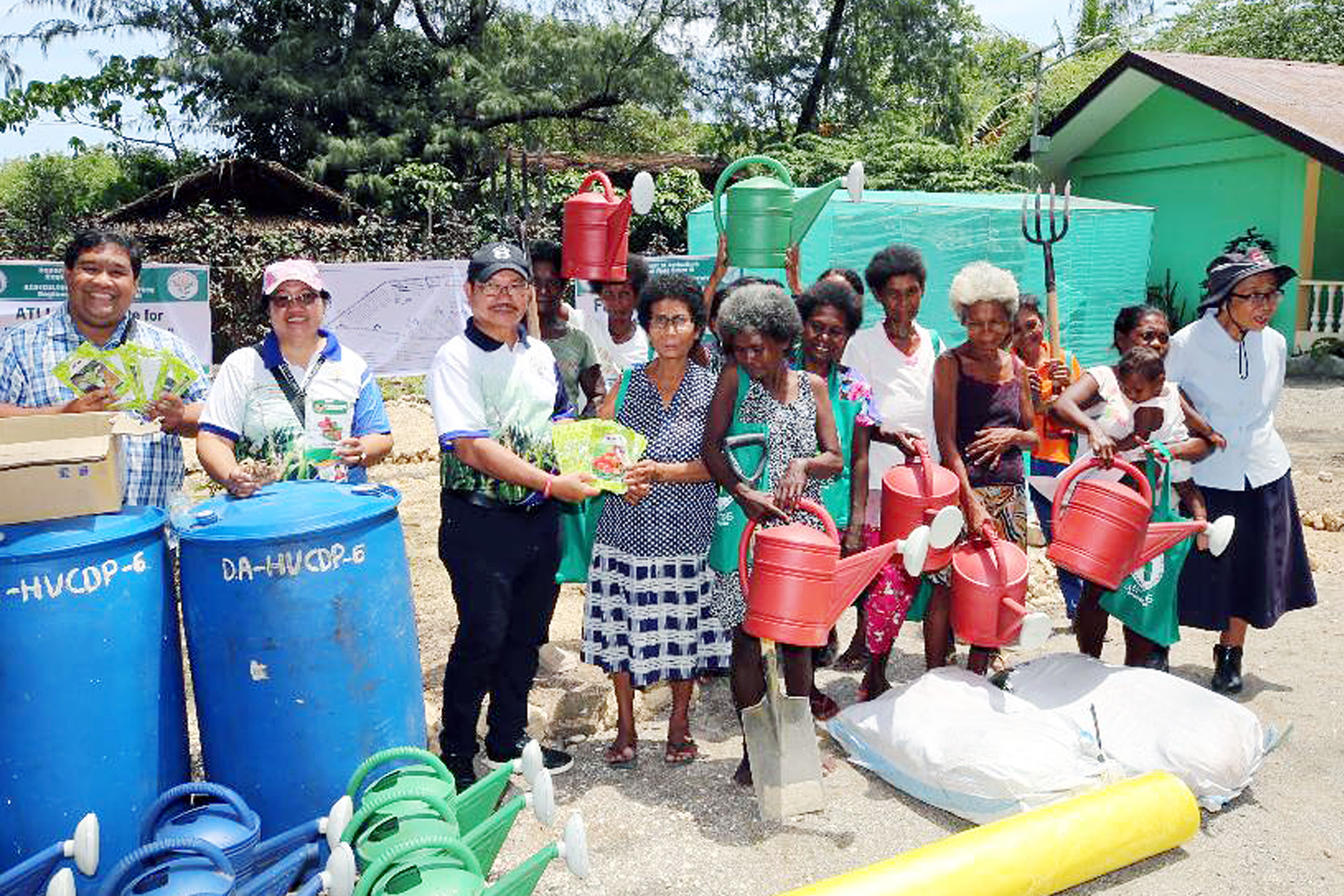
Department of Agriculture providing the Ati people tools and seeds for vegetable cultivation in the island.

The government in June 2018 announced that it is developing the Ati people's 2 ha (4.9 acres) ancestral land in Boracay into an agro-tourism area in an effort to integrate the Ati into the island's tourism industry. The development is part of the Department of Agriculture's Kabuhayan at Kaunlaran ng Kababayang Katutubo (transl. Livelihood and Progress of Filipino Indigenous Peoples; 4Ks) program which was originated by the department's secretary Emmanuel Piñol. A greenhouse will be set up for vegetable cultivation and a goat farm for the production of milk. An organic restaurant serving Ati cuisine and a hostel will also be set up along the beach area to be run by members of the Ati people.

The last batch of livelihood aid from the DSWD was distributed to Boracay residents on September 21. A total of ₱158.9 million worth of aid was given to residents affected by the closure.

From October 16 to 25, 2018, Boracay was partially opened as a dry run of its return to tourism operations. Filipino citizens were only allowed to visit the island as tourists with locals given priority. Assessment was made before Boracay was fully reopened on its soft opening on October 26.

== Impact ==
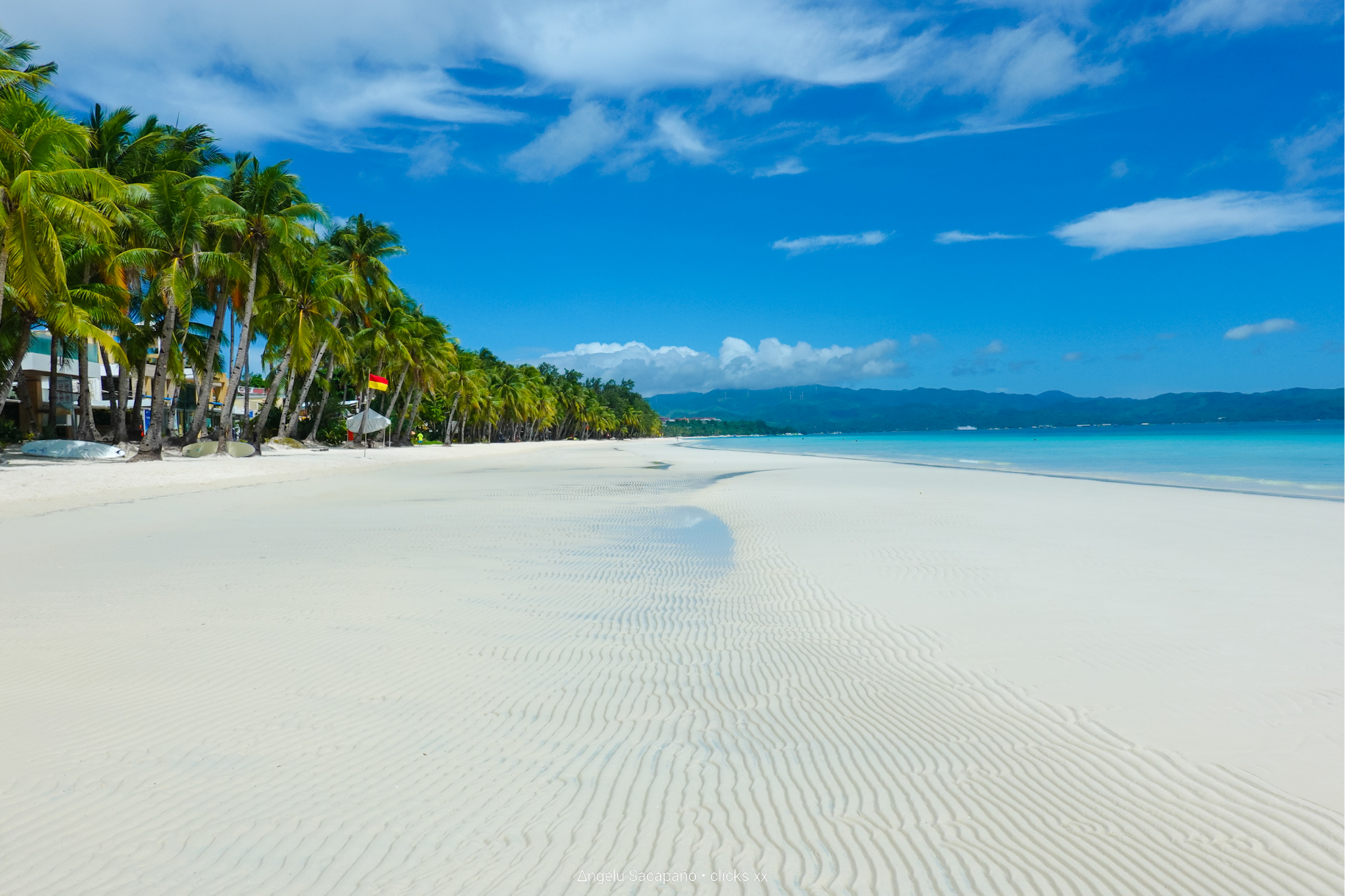
White beach in 2022.

About 400 hotels and restaurants were ordered to close for violating local environmental laws, while three casinos have been permanently shut down. Establishments built within the 30-meter shoreline easement were also demolished.

The government projected about ₱18–20 billion loss of potential gross receipts as a result of the six months closure of Boracay. Tourist stakeholders in the island project a loss of ₱30 billion as they estimate that 700,000 bookings by foreign tourists were cancelled in anticipation of the closure.

Philippine Airlines, Cebu Pacific and AirAsia Philippines announced that they would reduce flights to and from Kalibo International Airport in Kalibo and Godofredo P. Ramos Airport in Caticlan during the closure.

One estimate placed the number of jobs lost from the shutdown at 36,000, with lost revenues at ₱56 billion.

As a result of the closure, the Boracay police recorded only 14 index crimes from April 26 to June 22, 2018, as opposed to 176 cases during the same period the previous year.

An article in The Philippine Star following the re-opening said that local people and business owners had found the shutdown hard, but thought that it had been valuable.

Following Boracay's closure, the Department of Tourism issued a warning on October 19 to local government units based in five major tourist destinations to follow environmental laws, namely El Nido in Palawan, Panglao in Bohol, Oslob in Cebu, La Union, and Baguio. In 2020 a resort owner was arrested for environmental violations, and the government said that another 21 prosecutions were pending.

In 2021, the government task force working on the island's rehabilitation said that the work was "restoring ecological integrity". 81% of buildings in the beach easement zone had been demolished. Two of the total nine wetlands illegally occupied had been cleared. Water quality had improved and flooding was being addressed.

In 2022, the government issued a statement to say that rehabilitation had been successful. It said that fecal coliform levels are now within acceptable limits.

== Post-closure rehabilitation ==
Despite Boracay's soft opening to tourism on 26 October 2018, rehabilitation works were scheduled to continue on the island. At that point, only 70 of around six hundred businesses had been able to reach environmental standards and re-open. The second phase of rehabilitation was projected to last until mid-2019 and the third phase until the end of 2019. Visitor numbers were restricted and many new regulations instituted.

== Legal case ==
On June 27, 2018, the Department of the Interior and Local Government filed a complaint against 17 executive officials including Aklan Governor Florencio Miraflores and Malay Municipal Mayor Ciceron Cawaling over neglect over Boracay. The officials were alleged to have been lax in issuing building permits and to have failed to tackle illegal development activities on the island.

== Reform ==
=== Land use ===
On May 30, 2018, President Duterte declared that he planned to make the entire Island of Boracay a land reform area and wanted to prioritize Boracay's first inhabitants.

=== Tourism regulations ===
The Department of Environment and Natural Resources is working with the local government of Malay and other stakeholders to come up with new regulations once Boracay is opened to tourists. The DENR said that they will only allow 19,000 tourists to visit the island daily. If the limit is exceeded, only tourists with hotel reservations would be allowed but their respective hotels would be alerted by the agency that the daily limit of tourists in the island had already been reached. However it was later clarified that the government has yet to finalize the daily tourist limit to be imposed on Boracay.

The Department of Tourism would also prohibit smoking and drinking of alcohol in public places and the beaches of Boracay, though these activities would be allowed in designated areas. This is to reduce cigarette butts and shards from broken bottles in beaches. Large scale parties such as the "Laboracay", which draws in 60,000 to 70,000 tourists in three days, would no longer be allowed in the island. In 2024, however, the municipal government of Malay allowed beach parties to be held in the island again as part of efforts to attract younger tourists.

Under the new rules, 19,200 tourists per day will be allowed on the island. Moreover, fire eaters, masseuses, vendors, stray dogs, bonfires and builders of photo-op sandcastles have been banned from the beachfront. All water sports, aside for swimming, are also forbidden for the time being.

=== Sustainable tourism development through green transportation ===
The Department of Energy (DOE) donated 200 electric tricycles to the Malay local government in Aklan to improve the public transport system, embarking on "more sustainable tourism development for the island". These e-trikes are planned to replace the gasoline-powered tricycles on the island for "greener public transportation", and are also seen as the way forward to reduce the vulnerability of the country on the volatility of international oil price movements and other economic impacts.

One of the major beneficiaries of the e-trike project would be the Boracay Ati Tribal Organization (BATO) in coordination with the National Commission on Indigenous Peoples. A total of 10 e-trikes will be given to the BATO, which were intended for their livelihood.
