= Laguna Water =

Philippine public-private partnership

- Company type: Private
- Founded: Laguna, Philippines
- Headquarters: G/F One Evotech Building, Lakeside Evozone, Nuvali, Santa Rosa, Laguna, Philippines
- Key people: Virgilio C. Rivera Jr., President
- Products: Water Delivery; Sewerage and Sanitation
- Website: lagunawater.com.ph

Laguna AAAWater Corporation, branded as Laguna Water (stylized in uppercase), is a public-private partnership. It is a piped-water service provider created through a joint venture of the Provincial Government of Laguna (PGL) and Manila Water Philippine Ventures (MWPV), a wholly owned subsidiary of the Enrique Razon-led water industry leader, Manila Water Company. MWPV holds 70% of the company's shares while PGL owns the remaining 30%. PGL oversees the company's compliance with the prescribed service levels.

Laguna Water's operations began as early as 2004; however, it was only in September 2009 that its operations took off en route to becoming Laguna's largest water service provider when MWPV acquired the stake of then AAAWater Corporation.

Prior to the takeover, Laguna Water had been plagued by limited service coverage, high system losses, dilapidated infrastructure, and poor water quality and service; residents had to endure the high cost of drinking water.

In 2014, Laguna Water started providing used water services to industrial customers as it took over the operations of the Sewerage Treatment System of the country's premier industrial estate, Laguna Technopark, Inc.

Used water services will be made available to the residents of Laguna from the recent amendment to the concession agreement authorizing Laguna Water to provide waste water and related services throughout the province. The Septage Management Project is underway and is expected to be completed by 2017. Furthermore, Laguna Water is coordinating with the Toilet Board Coalition for the development of the Portable Toilet Solution, an initiative aimed at providing Laguna's poorest with access to hygiene and sanitation services.

== Business Area ==
Laguna Water is a Manila Water Philippine Ventures company, a wholly owned subsidiary of the Manila Water Company. It provide services on the East Zone of Laguna mainly Biñan, Santa Rosa, and Cabuyao with a total of 60 barangays and a population of about 900,000 as of end of 2014, and eventually to the entire province of Laguna. Laguna Water also provides used water services but are limited to the locators within the Laguna Technopark Inc. complex.

== See also ==
- Ayala Corporation
- Enrique Razon
- Laguna
- Manila Water Company
