= Boracay Water =

- Company type: Private
- Founded: Boracay, Philippines
- Headquarters: BIWC Sewerage Treatment Plant Compound, Boracay Island, Balabag, Malay Aklan, Philippines
- Key people: Virgilio C. Rivera Jr., President & CEO (MWPV)
- Products: Water Delivery; Sewerage and Sanitation
- Net income: PHP69.86 billion ▼(2015)

Boracay Island Water Company, Inc. (BIWC), branded as Boracay Water, is the joint venture company of Manila Water Company through its subsidiary Manila Water Philippine Ventures (MWPV) and the Philippine Tourism Authority (now Tourism Infrastructure and Enterprise Zone Authority) that delivers potable water service, sewerage service, and eventually, drainage management under a 25-year Concession Agreement to cater the approximately 1,000,000 tourist and 30,000 local residents of Boracay Island, Malay, Aklan, Philippines.

Boracay Water was incorporated on December 7, 2009, and commenced its operations last January 1, 2010. It services the entire Island of Boracay governed by three barangays namely Manoc-Manoc, Balabag, and Yapak, including the commercial districts popularly known as Stations 1, 2 and 3.

Boracay Water was granted the exclusive right to operate, manage, and expand water and used water facilities for a period of 25 years, renewable for another 25 years. The company was also granted the right to operate and maintain the existing drainage system upon its completion. It assumed operations on January 1, 2010 and began rehabilitating the island's water and used water infrastructure, to contribute to a sustainable environment and to the economic development of the island.

It helps in keeping the island's pristine beaches with the rehabilitation of the Balabag Sewage Treatment Plant, a facility that has consistently complied with the stringent pollution control parameters of the Department of Environment and Natural Resources (DENR) processing 6.5 million liters of used water per day. Used water service coverage is targeted to be raised by 75 percent by 2016.
