= 801 (disambiguation) =

801 is a year in the Common Era.

801 may also refer to:

- 801 (number)

== Years ==
- 801 BC, the year before the Common Era
- 801 AUC (48 AD), a year in the Roman Empire's calendar

== Places ==
- Area code 801, Salt Lake City, Utah, USA
- Route 801; see List of highways numbered 801
- 801 Helwerthia, a main belt asteroid, the 801st asteroid registered

== Military ==
- 801 Army General Hospital, Taiwan
- 801st Air Division, USAF
- 801st Bombardment Group (Provisional) of WWII
- 801 Squadron (disambiguation)
- HMTSS Te Mataili (801), Pacific Forum class patrol vessel of Tuvalu

== Transportation ==
- Class 801 (disambiguation) trains
- Ferrari 801 F1, 1957 Formula One racecar
- 801 (New Jersey bus)
- Various highways, see list of highways numbered 801

=== Aviation ===
- Flight 801 (disambiguation)
- BMW 801, aeroengine
- Pipistrel 801 eVTOL, autonomous air taxi

== Other uses ==
- Atelier 801, a French video game developer
- IBM 801, a CPU
- Yaoi, from the Japanese: 801, from ya-o-i (8-0-1)
- 801 (band), British supergroup
- 801 AM, radio stations at 801 kHz on the AM dial

== See also ==
- 801(k), U.S. tax code for DRIPs
