= DWMY =

- Naga, Camarines Sur; Philippines
- Broadcast area: Camarines Sur and surrounding areas
- Frequency: 90.3 MHz
- Branding: Star FM

Ownership
- Owner: Bombo Radyo Philippines; (People's Broadcasting Service, Inc.)
- Sister stations: DZNG Bombo Radyo

History
- First air date: 1989
- Last air date: November 30, 2006
- Former names: 90.3 MY (1989–1994)

Technical information
- Licensing authority: NTC

DWMY (90.3 FM) was a radio station owned and operated by Bombo Radyo Philippines through its licensee People's Broadcasting Service, Inc. It was formerly known as 90.3 MY from 1989 to 1994 and Star FM from 1994 to 2006, when it went off the air. As of today, the frequency is currently used by Radyo Bandera broadcasting from Polangui, Albay (46 km away).
