= DYRF =

DYRF may refer to:

- DYRF-AM, an AM station broadcasting in Cebu City, branded as Radio Fuerza
- DYRF-FM, an FM station broadcasting in Iloilo City, branded as Star FM
