= DWIM (disambiguation) =

DWIM may refer to:

- DWIM (do what I mean), in computer systems
- DWIM-AM, a defunct radio station in Calapan owned and operated by Aliw Broadcasting Corporation.
- DWIM-FM, a radio station in Baguio owned and operated by Bombo Radyo Philippines, broadcasting as 89.5 Star FM.
