= Class 801 =

Class 801 may refer to:

- British Rail Class 801, electric multiple unit train
- CIE 801 Class, diesel locomotive train engine
- FS ALe 801 power cars for the FS Class ALe 801/940 electric multiple unit trains

== See also ==
- 801 (disambiguation)
