= Human rights in the Philippines =

Human rights in the Philippines are protected by the Constitution and international law, but significant challenges remain, particularly regarding extrajudicial killings, freedom of expression, and the treatment of activists. While the law provides for rights like freedom of speech, assembly, and religion, recent reports highlight persistent issues with accountability for unlawful killings, the continuation of "red-tagging," and violence against journalists and human rights defenders.

The concept and practice of human rights within the Philippines is defined by Article III of the Philippine Constitution, as well as the United Nations' International Bill of Human Rights, to which the Philippines is a signatory.

== Concept ==
The concept of "human rights," in the context of the Philippines, pertains mainly (but is not limited) to the civil and political rights of a person living in the Philippines.

Human rights are a justified set of claims that set moral standards to members of the human race, not exclusive to a specific community or citizenship. Membership in the human race is the sole qualification to obtain these rights. Human rights, unlike area-specific conventions of international laws (e.g. European Convention on Human Rights and International Covenant on Civil and Political Rights and on Economic, Social and Cultural Rights), are universally justifiable as it pertains to the entire human race, regardless of geographical location.

== Human rights issues ==
=== Extrajudicial killings and forced disappearances ===
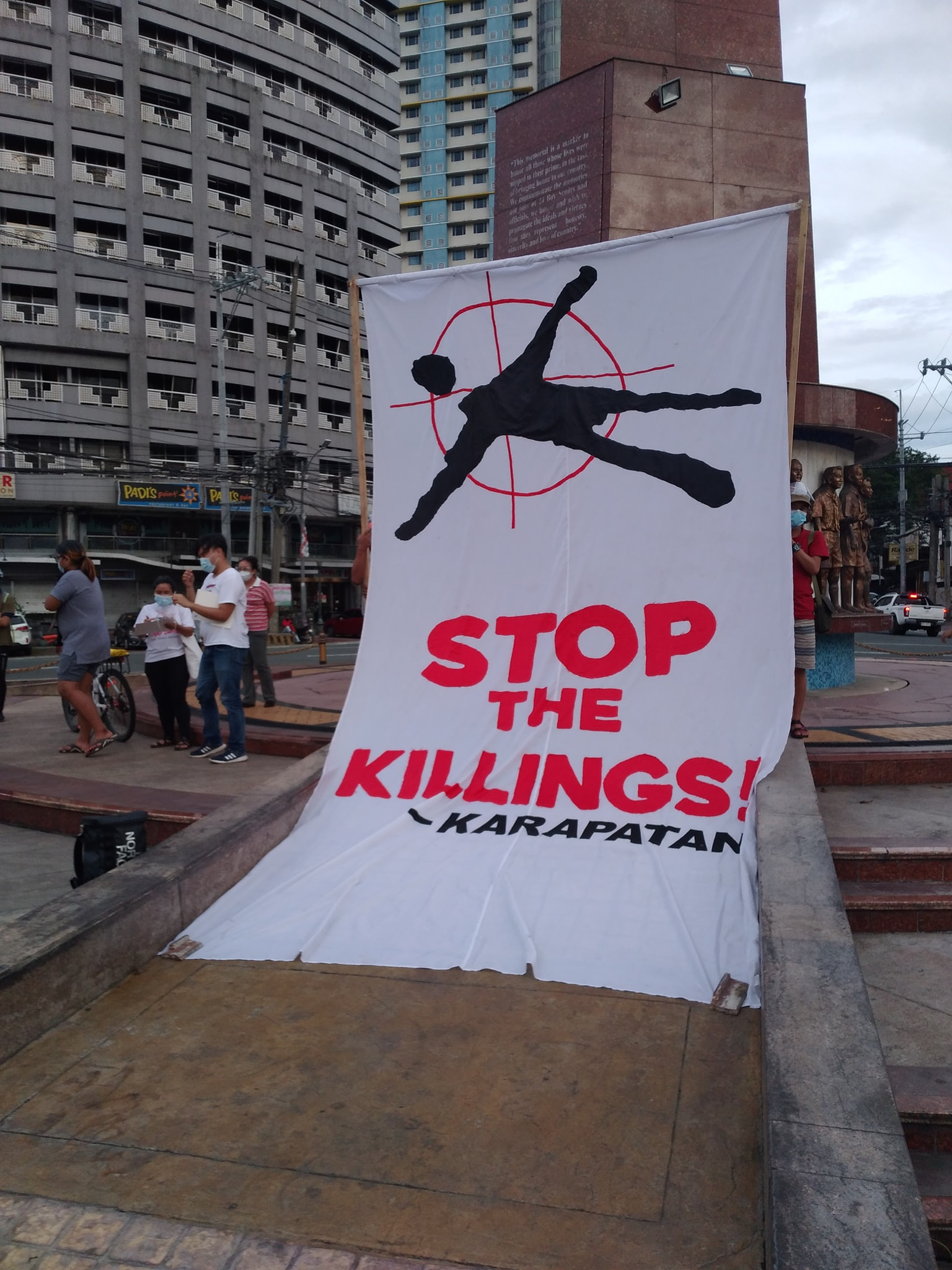
Stop the Killings in the Philippines banner.

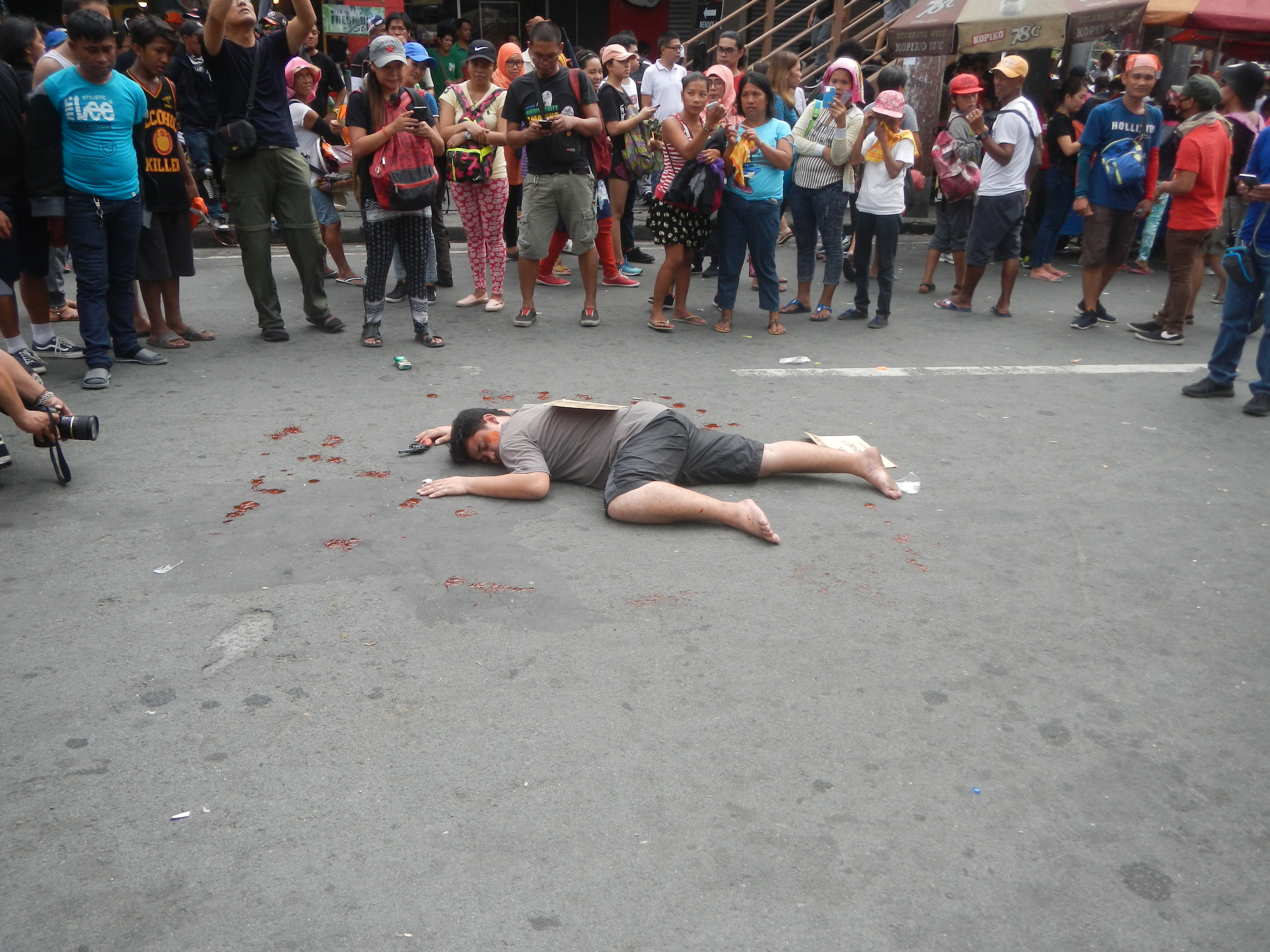
A reenactment of an extrajudicial killing during the 'National Day of Protest' on September 21, 2017, on the 45th Anniversary of the Proclamation of Martial Law

Extrajudicial killings and forced disappearances in the Philippines are illegal executions—unlawful or felonious killings—and forced disappearances in the Philippines. These are forms of extrajudicial punishment and include extrajudicial executions, summary executions, arbitrary arrest and detentions, and failed prosecutions due to the political activities of leading political figures, trade union members, dissidents or social figures, left-wing political parties, non-governmental organizations, political journalists, outspoken clergy, anti-mining activists, agricultural reform activists, and members of organizations that are alleged to be allied with or legal fronts of the communist movement or claimed supporters of the NPA and its political wing, the Communist Party of the Philippines (CPP). Other frequent targets are ancestral land rights defenders, Indigenous rights activists, environmentalists, and human rights activists.

==== Desaparecidos ====
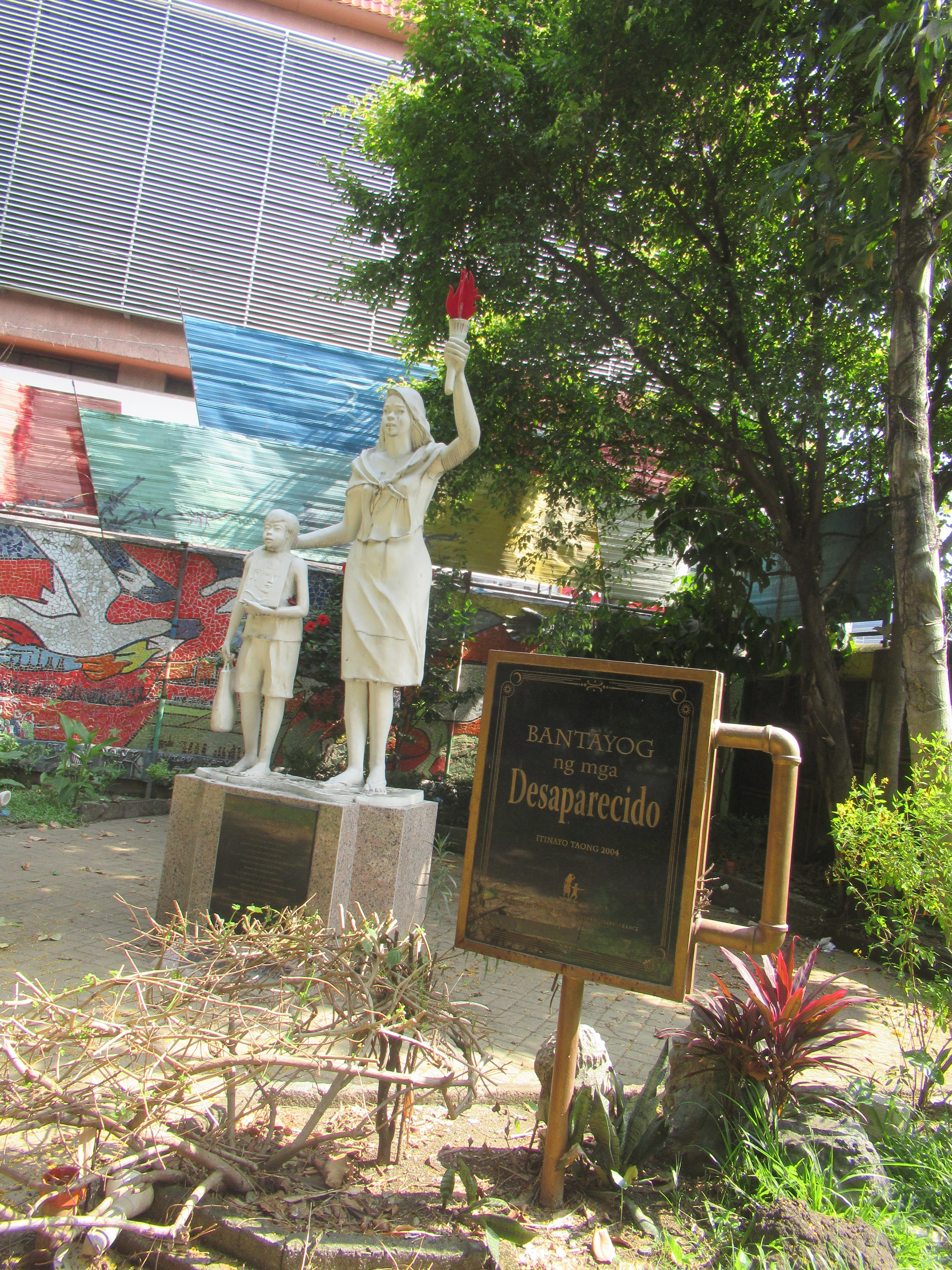
Bantayog Ng Mga Desaparecido at Baclaran Church

A forced disappearance (desaparecidos), on the other hand, as a form of extrajudicial punishment, is perpetrated by government officers when any of its public officers abduct an individual to vanish from public view, resulting in murder or plain sequestration. The victim is first kidnapped, then illegally detained in concentration camps, often tortured, and finally executed and the corpse hidden. International human rights groups have described the Philippines as a hotspot for enforced disappearances. According to Karapatan, there have been 1,900 cases of enforced disappearances in the Philippines since the dictatorship of Ferdinand Marcos.

=== Torture ===
Numerous sources had reported that torture was being practiced by the Communist Party of the Philippines-New Peoples Army, police and other security forces.

The Philippines enacted the Anti-Torture Law or Republic Act No. 9745 in 2009, prohibiting and criminalizing torture and other forms of ill-treatment against persons deprived of liberty. The first person to be convicted for torture under the law was Angeles City police officer Jerick Dee Jimenez in March 2016. As of 2024, there have been four convictions for violations of the Anti-Torture Law, after 3 police officers were sentenced for committing acts of torture in Koronadal City.

==== Torture during the Marcos dictatorship ====
Various forms of torture were used by the Marcos dictatorship in the Philippines between the declaration of martial law in 1972 and the Marcos family's ouster during the People Power Revolution in 1986. These included a range of methods Philippine forces picked up during its long periods of colonial occupation under Spanish, American, and Japanese forces, but also a number of new methods arising from the modern technologies of the later 20th century. These included sexual assaults including rape and degradation; non-sexual physical tortures including variants of electrocution, waterboarding, suffocation, burning, and beating; and various forms of psychological torture.

=== Labor ===
The Labor Code of the Philippines is the legal code governing employment practices and labor relations in the Philippines. The Labor Code stipulates standards in terms of wages and monetary benefits, hours of work, leave, rest days, holiday pays, and benefits, among others. The Labor Code sets the rules for hiring and firing of private employees; the conditions of work including maximum work hours and overtime; employee benefits such as holiday pay, thirteenth-month pay and retirement pay; and the guidelines in the organization and membership in labor unions as well as in collective bargaining. The prevailing labor code allows the typical working hour to be 8 hours a day, i.e. 48 hours a week with the provision that at least a day should be allowed to the workers as weekly off. The right to self-organization of a union is recognized, as is the right of a union to strike and to insist on a closed shop.

=== Indigenous peoples' rights ===
==== The Indigenous Peoples' Rights Act ====
The Indigenous Peoples' Rights Act of 1997 recognized and promoted the rights of Indigenous Cultural Communities/Indigenous Peoples (ICC/IPs) enumerated within the framework of the Constitution. It committed the State to recognize and promote the rights of ICCs/IPs to:

- Protect the rights of ICCs/IPs to their ancestral domains to ensure their economic, social and cultural well-being and shall recognize the applicability of customary laws governing property rights or relations in determining the ownership and extent of ancestral domain;
- Recognize, respect and protect the rights of ICCs/IPs to preserve and develop their cultures, traditions and institutions. It shall consider these rights in the formulation of national laws and policies;
- Guarantee that members of the ICCs/IPs regardless of sex, shall equally enjoy the full measure of human rights and freedoms without distinction or discrimination;
- Take measures, with the participation of the ICCs/IPs concerned, to protect their rights and guarantee respect for their cultural integrity, and to ensure that members of the ICCs/IPs benefit on an equal footing from the rights and opportunities which national laws and regulations grant to other members of the population.

It declared that the State recognizes its obligations to respond to the strong expression of the ICCs/IPs for cultural integrity by assuring maximum ICC/IP participation in the direction of education, health, as well as other services of ICCs/IPs, in order to render such services more responsive to the needs and desires of these communities.

==== Indigenous land rights ====
Philippine Indigenous peoples are granted rights to their ancestral domain under the Indigenous Peoples' Rights Act. Under the law, ancestral domain belongs to all generations and includes its physical environment, including the spiritual and cultural bonds sites. The law also recognizes Indigenous peoples' rights to the natural resources within the ancestral domain. The 2022 State of the Indigenous Peoples Address Report by Legal Rights and Natural Resources Center states that 1.25 million hectares of Indigenous lands are threatened by destructive projects that may cause massive ecological disturbance including biodiversity loss and pollution.

The Philippines is a signatory to the United Nations Declaration on the Rights of Indigenous Peoples and the International Covenant on Economic, Social and Cultural Rights.

==== Transnational advocacy ====
There are international advocacy groups that aim to promote the causes of environmental and human rights defenders in Mindanao, Philippines. Activism carried out by transnational organizations, which may be described as 'participatory', may solicit engagement from local actors, stakeholders, and poor members of communities and include them all in policymaking decisions. Regarding the Lumad, human rights defenders wish to bring attention to Indigenous social issues. According to Duraippah et al., ideal participation is reached when the principles of transparency and empowerment—through the education of transnational actors through local actors—emphasize the needs of Indigenous peoples.

Social power illustrates the exclusion of Lumad people from political decisions, which in turn, perpetuates existing human rights issues. Power in this case is an umbrella term since social power is the real desire in order to pursue true control over livelihoods and the rules that govern them. As of 1998, social power was not in the hands of Indigenous peoples, therefore, online organizing serves to arm individuals in their community organizing network with education to balance with the inherent power conflict.

Lumad peoples rely on the natural resources on their ancestral lands for their livelihoods; they are therefore deprived of means to support themselves and their families when they are displaced or forced to evacuate. Fundraising by advocacy groups serve to support Lumad communities and their highest form of protest.

=== Impunity ===
Human rights groups, such as Karapatan, Amnesty International, and Human Rights Watch, have pointed to a culture of impunity as an issue that allows human rights violations to continue in the Philippines.

The United Nations Human Rights Office said that the Philippines needs to address impunity and barriers to seeking justice. It said that the Philippine drug war and government measures against national security threats lead to human rights abuses, such as the vilification of dissent, arbitrary arrest and detention, and extrajudicial killings.

=== Crimes against humanity ===
Rodrigo Duterte is facing charges before the International Criminal Court (ICC) for killings in the Philippine drug war while he was President of the Philippines. Human rights group Karapatan estimates that 30,000 killings are attributed to the drug war from 2016 to 2022. Though the Philippines withdrew from the Rome Statute effective March 16, 2019, the Supreme Court of the Philippines, ruled that the Philippines still has an obligation to cooperate in the ICC proceedings. Duterte was arrested on March 11, 2025, by the Philippine National Police and Interpol after a warrant was issued by the ICC.

== Stakeholder organizations ==
=== Government ===
==== Commission on Human Rights ====
The Commission on Human Rights (CHR) is an independent office created by Section 18, Article XIII of the Philippine Constitution, with the primary function of investigating all forms of human rights violations involving civil and political rights in the Philippines. The commission is composed of a chairperson and four members, majority of which must be lawyers under the constitution.

The commission is empowered to investigate human rights violations involving civil and political rights, adopt rules of procedure and issue contempt citations, provide legal measures for the protection of human rights in the Philippines, and several other powers in relation to the protection of human rights.

===== Programs =====
The CHR is in charge of the following programs;

1. Human Rights Protection Program
  - The Human Rights Protection Program implemented the Legal and Investigation Office which provides legal aid and counseling services; conducts monitoring of cases/complaints with concerned agencies; conducts rights based public inquiry on issues and concerns of marginalized and disadvantage sectors; and conducts studies to establish certain human rights conditions/situations affecting human development for the adoption of policies, programs and measures for the promotion of human rights. The Legal and Investigation Office also provides appropriate human rights investigative interventions; medico-legal services; conducts alternative dispute resolution of cases thru mediation; quick reaction activities; fact finding missions; rights based situation tracking and rights based investigative monitoring.
2. The Human Rights Education Teaching Exemplars
  - The CHR established linkages and collaboration efforts with the Department of Education with this effort, the two agencies forged a Joint of Declaration of Undertaking (JDU) in 1992 and a Memorandum of Agreement (MOA) in 1996 which provided development of human rights education curriculum for integration across the two levels of education. To implement the main provision of the Memorandum of Agreement, a joint project was undertaken entitled: Writing Workshop in the Development of Human Rights Education Teaching Exemplars for the Elementary and the Secondary Levels.
3. Human Rights Linkages Development and Strategic Planning
  - The CHR established a Legislative and Program Division which is in charge of monitoring bills with human rights implications filed in Congress and coordinating in the preparation of the CHRP position on proposed measures. The LPD has participated in almost all committee hearings and Technical Working Group meetings in both houses of Congress and in such other fora on matters with human rights implications. Right to Development Program. A system of developing and monitoring rights-based programs and measures across institutions aimed at creating enabling environment for poverty reduction linked with the nine components of good governance as follows: Electoral and Political Reforms, Right to Development, Judicial Reform, Anti-Corruption, Governance Review, Civil Service & Economic Management, Globalization and Corporate Citizenship, Decentralization & Local Governance.

==== Department of Justice ====
The Department of Justice of the Philippine Government is its principal law agency. It derives its mandate primarily from the Administrative Code of 1987 (Executive Order No. 292). It carries out this mandate through the department proper and the department's attached agencies under the direct control and supervision of the Secretary of Justice.

The DOJ, through its offices and constituent/attached agencies, is also the government's legal counsel and representative in litigations and proceedings requiring the services of a lawyer; implements the Philippines' laws on the admission and stay of aliens within its territory; and provides free legal services to indigent and other qualified citizens.

===== Functions =====
As the principal law agency of the Philippines, the Department of Justice carries out specific functions in order to fulfill its basic functions

1. Administration of the Criminal Justice System
  - The DOJ investigates the commission of crimes and prosecutes offenders through the National Bureau of Investigation (NBI) and the National Prosecution Service (NPS), respectively. The DOJ administers the probation and correction system of the country through the Bureau of Corrections (BuCor), the Board of Pardons and Parole (BPP) and the Parole and Probation Administration (PPA).
2. Legal Counsel of Government
  - The DOJ, through the Office of the Solicitor General (OSG) and the Office of the Government Corporate Counsel (OGCC), acts as the legal representative of the Government of the Philippines, its agencies and instrumentalities including government owned and controlled corporations and their subsidiaries, officials and agents in any proceeding, investigation or matter requiring the services of a lawyer.
3. Provision of Free Legal Assistance
  - The DOJ provides free legal assistance/representation to indigents and poor litigants as well as other qualified persons in criminal, civil, and labor cases, administrative and other quasi-judicial proceedings and non-commercial disputes through the Public Attorney's Office (PAO) pursuant to Republic act No. 9406.
4. Alternative Dispute Resolution
  - The Alternative Dispute Resolution Act of 2004 (RA 9285) created the Office for Alternative Dispute Resolution (OADR), which is an agency attached to the DOJ which function is to promote, develop and expand the use of alternative dispute resolution in civil and commercial disputes.
5. Other Functions
  1. Witness protection – The Witness Protection, Security and Benefit Act (R.A. 6981), mandates the DOJ to formulate and implement a Witness Protection, Security and Benefit Program for the admission and protection of witnesses.
  2. Anti Human trafficking – The Anti-Trafficking in Persons Act of 2003 (R.A. 9208), mandates the prosecution of persons accused of human trafficking and for that purpose, created the Inter-Agency Council Against Trafficking (IACAT).
  3. Rape Victim Assistance and Protection – The Rape Victim Assistance and Protection Act of 1998 (RA 8505), mandated the DOJ to participate in inter-agency efforts to establish Rape Crisis Centers in every city or province for the purpose of rendering assistance to rape victims.
  4. Anti-Child Pornography – The Anti-Child Pornography Act of 2009 (R.A. 9775), designates the Secretary of Justice as member of Inter-Agency Council Against Child Pornography that is tasked to coordinate, monitor and oversee the implementation of Anti-Child Pornography Act

===== Programs =====
The Department of Justice heads a number of projects, among others are as follows;

1. Child Protection Program
  - The Child Protection program implemented the Special Committee for Child Protection which is a body charged with monitoring the implementation of The Special Protection For a Child Against Abuse, Exploitation, and Discrimination Act (R.A. 7610). Which protects a child who is below 18 years of age or one who is over 18 years of age but who cannot take care of himself fully because of a physical or mental disability or condition from abuse.
2. Criminal Code Committee
  - The purpose of the Criminal Code Committee is to form a new Criminal Code of the Philippines that is updated, modern, simplified, responsive and truly Filipino, in order to improve the administration of justice in the country and enhance access to justice of the poor and other marginalized sectors. It is composed of representatives from the executive, legislative and judicial branches of government.
3. DOJ Action Center
  - The Department of Justice Action Center acts on complaints, requests for legal assistance and queries of walk-in clients as well as over the telephone. Any caller can talk to a lawyer or paralegal officer who can render him assistance.
4. Juvenile Justice and Welfare
  - The Secretary of Justice is in charge of supervising the implementation of the Juvenile Justice and Welfare Act of 2006. (R.A. 9344). This act covers the different stages involving children at risk and children in conflict with the law from prevention to rehabilitation and reintegration.
5. Office of Cybercrime
  - The Office of Cybercrime is in charge of implementing the Cybercrime Prevention Act of 2012 (R.A. 10175).

==== Department of Labor and Employment ====
The Department of Labor and Employment (DOLE) concerns itself with the protection and welfare of Filipino workers both in the country as well as abroad, and responds accordingly to socio-political and economic challenges that would affect the workers. DOLE is also mandated to create policies and programs as an arm of the Executive Branch in its field of concern. It has set up a number of offices and agencies: 16 regional offices, 83 field offices, 4 satellite offices, 28 overseas posts, 6 bureaus, 7 staff services, and 11 attached agencies. These subgroups are tasked to closely monitor and coordinate the implementation of policies and programs.

DOLE, with the International Labour Organization (ILO), was a major contributor to the adoption of the Convention on Decent Work for Domestic Workers, the Maritime Labour Convention of 2006, and The Kasambahay Law (R.A. 10461).

==== National Commission on Indigenous Peoples ====
The National Commission on Indigenous Peoples (NCIP) was born through the merging of the Office for Northern Cultural Communities (ONCC), and the Office for Southern Cultural Communities (OSCC) in the year 1997 through RA 8371 or "Indigenous Peoples' Rights Act of 1997". It is a highly specialized commission with different projects for each region.

==== Security sector ====
Reform of the Philippines' security organizations, particularly the Armed Forces of the Philippines and later the Philippine National Police, to align them with the principles of human rights and the rule of civilian law has been a government concern ever since the 1986 People Power Revolution deposed Ferdinand Marcos and restored the principle of civilian control of the military. Broad principles to this effect were embedded in the 1987 Constitution of the Philippines, and the various coup attempts of the years immediately following the People Power Revolution led to the recommendation of more systemic reforms, as recommended by the 1990 Davide Commission Report and later reiterated by the 2003 Feliciano Commission Report.

However, issues such as extrajudicial killings, red-tagging, assaults on the media and other human rights issues have persisted through all the Philippine administrations after Marcos.

=== Intergovernmental organizations ===
==== International Labor Organization ====
The International Labor Organization (ILO) is a tripartite organization that started working with the Philippines in 1994. Its vision is as follows:

"The main aims of the ILO are to promote rights at work, encourage decent employment opportunities, enhance social protection and strengthen dialogue on work-related issues."

The ILO Manila office has been active since its founding, starting with the ratifying of the Workman's Compensation (Accidents) Convention 17 based on Act. No. 1874 to extend responsibility of employers for personal injuries and death suffered by employees at work.

===== Programs and projects =====
Below are a number of the programs and projects by ILO Manila as of 2015.

1. Decent Work Country Programme (DWCP) is ILO Manila's main project. It was made to support the country's Labor Employment Program (LEP). The two major priorities are decent jobs for a competitive Philippines, and improved labor market governance. To achieve this, the ILO will help strengthen the working capacity of the Philippines and apply international labor conventions to constantly update the LEP. The United Nations Development Assistance Framework has listed the DWCP as ILO Manila's top priority.
2. Infrastructure for Rural Productivity Enhancement Sector (INFRES) Project (June 4, 2001 – December 31, 2006) was completed to improve their living conditions, poor people require access to employment and basic goods and services. The poor can improve their situation through national and local investment in infrastructure that provides jobs.
3. ILO-IPEC Project in support of the Philippine Time-Bound Programme (September 2, 2002 – August 31, 2007) was the first and most significant contribution toward the elimination of the worst forms of child labour. It has been designed to leverage resources, and to link up with national and international programs for the benefit of Filipino boys and girls.
4. Strategies and Tools Against Social Exclusion and Poverty (STEP) (January 1, 2003 – June 1, 2005) aimed to provide better quality of life to informal economy workers and their families through better access to health care. This is a donor project from the Government of Norway.
5. Protecting Domestic Workers against Forced Labour and Trafficking (DOMWORK) (May 3, 2004 – December 31, 2006) was a program on the regulation and condition of Filipino domestic workers. It aimed to empower domestic workers on their rights as well as reduce the cases of abuse.

"Through discussions on gender equality, the ILO noted that problems had deepened for the most vulnerable, including women in domestic work. Yet while the global economic downturn has contributed to aggravating their vulnerabilities, domestic workers are beginning to realize gains through changes in public attitude."

1. Indigenous Peoples Development Programme (IPDP) - to protect the rights of indigenous peoples.
2. Tripartite Action for the Protection and Promotion of the Rights of Migrant Workers in the ASEAN Region (May 1, 2012 – March 31, 2016) is an ongoing ASEAN TRIANGLE project that aims to significantly reduce the exploitation of labour migrants in the region through increased legal and safe migration and improved labour protection. This is a donor project from the Government of Canada.
3. Building the Capacity of the Philippines Labour Inspectorate (December 15, 2014 – December 14, 2017) is a collaborative project with DOLE to strengthen its Labour Law Compliance System (LLCS) by promoting a positive mindset towards work.

=== Civil society organizations ===
==== Focused on indigenous peoples ====
Tebtebba

Tebtebba is an organization that was established in 1996. They have been an active participant in processes that have led to the adoption of international human rights law and other international instruments, policies, and agreements. These include the UN Declaration on the Rights of Indigenous Peoples (UNDRIP) and the establishment of spaces within the United Nations, such as the UN Permanent Forum on Indigenous Issues, among others.

Cordillera Peoples Alliance

The Cordillera Peoples Alliance (CPA) was founded in 1984. Among many other projects and campaigns, CPA has pushed for regional autonomy, campaigns for the defense of land, life, and resources, opposed large-scale mining in the Cordillera to save Abra river, and exposed violations of human rights committed in their region.

Kalipunan Ng Mga Katutubong Mamamayanng Pilipinas – KATRIBU (National Federation of Indigenous Peoples of the Philippines)

KATRIBU was founded in the year 1987. Previously known as KAMP, KATRIBU aims for the attainment of land rights and for the formation of allegiances and government of the indigenous peoples. KATRIBU is currently protesting DMCI's planned 15-megawatt coal-fired power plant in Narra, Palawan and the mining policy of the Aquino administration.

Sabokahan Unity of Lumad Women

Sabokahan Unity of Lumad Women was founded in 2003. Composed of eight ethnolinguistic tribes across Southern Mindanao, Sabokahan is a grassroots organization led and created by Lumad women dedicated to the advancement of women's rights, equality, and liberation. Save Pantaron and Pulangi River Campaigns are two projects Sabokahan hold to protect biodiversity. To generate income to support themselves, Sabokahan organizes collective bead-making cooperatives among Lumad women.

Liyang Network

Liyang Network is a local-to-global advocacy group that emerged from the calls-to-action of Sabokahan. Before the pandemic, Liyang Network held immersion trips alongside Sabokahan in administering opportunities to educate and provide a transformative cultural experience to those who wish to engage in the history of the community directly from the voices of the Lumad people. Their current remote work entails organizing forums and webinars for educational discussions on current sociopolitical issues and the root causes of these issues—mainly the needs of Lumad and rural communities. These activities aim to address and amplify the push against human rights violations, exploitation, and discrimination, such as the militarization of communities, the closure of Indigenous schools, and illegal arrests.

== Notable violations in Philippine history ==
=== Marcos administration (1965–1986) ===
On September 21, 1972, then President Ferdinand Marcos declared Martial Law in the Philippines. Marcos gave the armed forces the power to prevent or suppress... any act of insurrection or rebellion. A total of 398 disappearances, 1,388 extrajudicial killings, and 1,499 killed or wounded in massacres were recorded but not every victim was accounted for.

After the declaration of Martial Law, Marcos issued six general orders and an instruction to close privately owned media facilities. The Press Secretary, Francisco Tatad, and Secretary for National Defense, Juan Ponce Enrile, were ordered by Marcos "to take over and control or cause the taking over and control of all such newspapers, magazines, radio and television facilities and all other media communications..." The information released to the public was highly censored and prevented journalists from releasing any suspicious information about the administration. For the dictatorship, failure to abide would lead to arrest and eventual torture and execution. Lawyer and statesman Sen. Jose W. Diokno, the father of human rights, was one of those arrested. He would be released and later founded the Free Legal Assistance Group (FLAG), the largest group of lawyers to combat human rights abuses by the dictatorship, and it managed to deal with over 90 percent of human rights cases during martial law.

The assassination of Senator Benigno "Ninoy" Aquino triggered the peaceful 1986 EDSA People Power Revolution, led by Aquino's wife, Corazon "Cory" Aquino. The peaceful revolution united the nation in a call against Marcos to uphold their human rights. It led to the abolition of Martial Law (de jure abolished in 1981), the exile of the Marcos family, as well as Cory Aquino's rise to the presidency and the current 1987 Constitution. This, in turn paved the way for the creation of the Presidential Committee on Human Rights, now the Commission on Human Rights which was founded by Atty. Diokno.

=== Arroyo administration (2001–2010) ===
The Arroyo Administration was riddled by its several issues on several forms of violations against human rights. Most of these which include the increase in military power and presence, especially in Muslim Mindanao. Philip Alston, a UN Rapporteur, published Promotion and Protection of all Human Rights, Civil, Political, Economic, Social and Cultural Rights, including the Right To Development in 2008 that chronicled and reported the situation he had found while in the Philippines. Many incidents of extrajudicial killings were linked to this report, most notable of which is Sichi Bustamante-Gandinao, who was a direct testimony of the abuses concerning the military.

==== Maguindanao massacre ====
The Maguindanao massacre (also known as the Ampatuan massacre, named after the town where mass graves of victims were found) occurred on the morning of November 23, 2009, in the town of Ampatuan in Maguindanao, Philippines (now located in Maguindanao del Sur). The 58 victims were on their way to file a certificate of candidacy for Esmael Mangudadatu, vice-mayor of Buluan, when they were kidnapped and later killed. Mangudadatu was challenging Datu Unsay mayor Andal Ampatuan Jr., son of the incumbent Maguindanao governor Andal Ampatuan Sr. and member of one of Mindanao's leading Muslim political clans, in the forthcoming Maguindanao gubernatorial election, part of the national elections in 2010. Those killed included Mangudadatu's wife, his two sisters, journalists, lawyers, aides, and motorists who were witnesses or were mistakenly identified as part of the convoy.

The Maguindanao massacre is one of the deadliest massacres to ever occur in the Philippines, a country known for its political oppression and corruption following the events of Ferdinand Marcos' administration. At the time, the Committee to Protect Journalists (CPJ) called the Maguindanao massacre the "single deadliest event" for journalists since they began compiling records in 1992; at least 34 journalists are known to have died in the attack. Even before the massacre, the CPJ had labelled the Philippines the second most dangerous country for journalists, second only to Iraq.

==== Sichi Bustamante-Gandinao ====
Sichi Bustamante-Gandinao was a peasant organizer in Salay, Misamis Oriental. She was the chair of the Misamis Oriental Farmers Organization and the coordinator of the party list group Bayan Muna. She was also an outspoken critic of the actions the Citizens' Armed Force Geographical Unit (CAFGU), and how they disrupt the relatively peaceful communities in Misamis Oriental. Philip Alston was a UN Rapporteur, who had Gandinao as a testimony to the extrajudicial killings, and other violations of human rights the military was practicing, whether it was the military is contested by the Military. The Alston report was published in 2008, which highlighted these abuses through the United Nations General Assembly. In March 2007, however, Gandinao, together with her husband and daughter, was walking home after a day of doing farm work. Gandinao was then shot four times by two men on a motorcycle heading towards a nearby military camp, while Gandinao's family helplessly watched the attack. The local officials and passers-by all told Gandinao's husband and daughter that they were too busy to tend to the bleeding Gandinao. According to reports, after two hours of bleeding profusely, the assailants went back to the scene of the crime and even watched the entire ordeal of Gandinao. Her husband had to carry her to the Cagayan de Oro ambulance, which took another hour to get to the actual hospital. In the Cagayan de Oro hospital, Gandinao was pronounced dead on arrival.

==== Vigilantism and death squad ====
According to the Alston report, the presence of "vigilantism" and death squad in Davao has been a commonplace occurrence, and has been going on for some time now, prior to his visit in the Philippines from 2006 to 2007. The Death Squad, however, operate with no intention of hiding their identities, and in broad daylight. Davao Mayor Rodrigo Duterte has held office, aside from a brief stint as a congressman, since 1988. Rodrigo Duterte is known for his strict, anti-criminal approach in governing Davao City. However, in the same report, Rodrigo Duterte has admitted that hundreds of unsolved murders were committed during his time as mayor, and that he takes "full responsibility" for the fact that the murders have remained unsolved. When Duterte was first elected as mayor, he faced a Davao with problems like rampant youth gangs, the New Peoples' Army (NPA) killing policemen routinely, and crime. The Davao Death Squad (DDS) has had over 500 victims since 1998; killing targets in public and in broad daylight. These executions were a response to petty crimes, and targets are sent warnings explaining why they are targeted by the DDS. It was, however, noted that during Duterte's term as mayor, criminal activity has decreased significantly. It should also be noted, however, that there are hundreds of unsolved murders.

=== Benigno Aquino administration (2010–2016) ===
In 2016, the Philippines was ranked the world's 4th most dangerous country for journalists, "where journalists are murdered and their killers go unpunished", according to data from the committee to Protect Journalists. According to Human Rights Watch, almost 300 leftists activist, human rights workers, and people alleged to be supporters of the New People's Army were killed from 2010 to 2016.

Information about disappearances and murders of reporters are kept from the public, making several agencies/organizations as well as whistleblowers at risk of exposure to harm. Some of the journalists killed in their line of work during the Aquino government were Gerry Ortega, Christopher Guarin, and Rubylita Garcia.

The Aquino administration implemented reforms towards more effective criminal investigation procedures, in addition to passing laws to better uphold human rights. However, these reforms are underdeveloped. An example is the formation of the Inter-Agency Committee on Extra-Legal Killings, which encountered problems in identifying which case to pursue due to the process requirements.

=== Duterte administration (2016–2022) ===
On June 15, 2020, Maria Ressa, the founder and executive editor of the news website Rappler, and Reynaldo Santos Jr. researcher at Rappler were sentenced with a minimum of six months and one day and a maximum of six years’ imprisonment and fine of US$4,000 for moral damages and US$4,000 for exemplary damages. They were critics of President Rodrigo Duterte who reported on the Philippine drug war that killed more than 12,000 Filipinos. Human Rights Watch found in an investigation that the police are falsifying evidence to justify the illegal killing of civilians.

On June 26, 2020, Philippines police arrested around 20 people at an LGBT pride event. They were protesting against an anti-terrorism bill, which will eliminate legal protection and police can detain groups and individuals without any warrant under the label of terrorism. The arrest took place without any explanation from the police force. Human Rights Watch urged authorities to release those detained and allow them to exercise their fundamental right to protest peacefully.

On July 3, 2020, Amnesty International criticized the controversial Anti-Terrorism Act, signed by President Rodrigo Duterte, and said that the new law is the latest example of the country's ever-worsening human rights record.

On March 21, 2021, woman human rights defender Renalyn Tejero was arbitrarily arrested by officials of the Philippine National Police and the Philippine Army in Cagayan de Oro, Misamis Oriental. She was subsequently falsely accused and her request to call her family and lawyer was also denied. Prior to her arrest, Tejero had been a victim of red-tagging, a stigmatization practice used by the authorities to target as "terrorists" or "communists" any individuals or groups perceived to be critical of the government.

==== Extrajudicial killings ====
With the vigilante killings becoming rampant, the Citizen's Council for Human Rights (CCHR) asked President Duterte to initiate measures to stop the surge of extrajudicial killings.

The killing of Larry Que on December 20, 2016, was the first recorded media-related killing under the administration of President Rodrigo Duterte. Shortly before becoming president Duterte said, "Just because you're a journalist you are not exempted from assassination, if you're a son of a bitch. Freedom of expression cannot help you if you have done something wrong." The president established the Presidential Task Force on Violations of the Right to Life, Liberty and Security of the Members of the Media in October 2016 to address the danger to journalists.

On August 21, 2020, the United Nations raised concerns with the Philippine government over the killing of peace consultant Randall "Randy" Echanis and human rights defender Zara Alvarez. The UN Human Rights Office described the situation as alarming since the two victims were previously tagged as terrorists because of their work, and called for transparent investigations.

On August 24, 2020, Human Rights Watch revealed that employees of Karapatan, a human rights organization in Philippines had received death threats. The threats came a week after unidentified gunmen shot dead Zara Alvarez, a paralegal worker for the group, in Bacolod City in the central Philippines on August 17. Karapatan has been alleged to be a particular target of Philippine security forces and their agents.

The International Criminal Court is investigating extrajudicial killings in the Philippines and looking into the alleged involvement of President Duterte. The Supreme Court of the Philippines has ruled that the country has an obligation to cooperate in proceedings conducted by the International Criminal Court.

==== New Bataan massacre ====
The New Bataan massacre occurred when five Lumad teachers and community workers and their two drivers were killed in Barangay Andap, New Bataan, Davao de Oro, Philippines, on February 24, 2022. The ones who were killed were Chad Booc, Gelejurain "Jurain" Ngujo II, Elegyn Balonga, Tirso Añar, and Robert Aragon—collectively termed as 'New Bataan 5'. Family members, advocacy groups and activists, and politicians have described the event as a massacre, while the Armed Forces of the Philippines asserted that what happened was an encounter between the forces of New People's Army (NPA) and the 10th Infantry Division of the AFP. The Communist Party of the Philippines (CPP) said that there were no NPA units in the area at the time of the event.

=== Marcos Jr. administration (2022–present) ===
President Bongbong Marcos promised to uphold human rights during his term. The Philippines stated in 2022 that it was committed to cooperate with United Nations human rights mechanisms. The United Nations noted the failure of law enforcement to address human rights violations and recommended that the Philippines review all killings in the government's drug war.

Drug war killings, attacks on activists, harassment of media, and red-tagging have continued. During the first year of Bongbong Marcos's term, there were 336 drug war killings, mostly during police operations, and 8 cases of forced disappearances. In 2024, the Commission on Human Rights said that human rights violations under the Duterte and Bongbong Marcos presidencies were almost similar. The Defend NGO Alliance stated that the human rights situation may have worsened under Bongbong Marcos. The alliance called for the abolition of repressive agencies and policies, such as the National Task Force to End Local Communist Armed Conflict and the Anti-Terrorism Act.

As of November 2024, four journalists have been killed while doing their jobs under the Bongbong Marcos presidency. This includes broadcaster Percy Lapid who was red-tagged and subsequently killed near his home. Journalists also continue to be red-tagged, harassed, or jailed, such as Frenchie Mae Cumpio, who is detained on allegations of terror financing.

Congress representatives and human rights groups have urged the Bongbong Marcos administration to rejoin the Rome Statute and the International Criminal Court. As of March 2025, the government has refused to rejoin the International Criminal Court.

== International agreements ==
The Philippines is a signatory to the Universal Declaration of Human Rights (UDHR) drafted by the United Nations (UN) in the 1948. The Universal Declaration of Human Rights was adopted, alongside the Genocide Convention and the Convention on the Elimination of All Forms of Racial Discrimination, by the United Nations in response to the tragic and horrendous violations of human rights during the Second World War. The United Nations Charter, a treaty, was created in order to define what roles, powers, and duties the United Nations is allowed to practice in dealing with international relations. Article I of the UN Charter states that the UN aims:

"To achieve international co-operation in solving international problems of an economic, social, cultural, or humanitarian character, and in promoting and encouraging respect for human rights and for fundamental freedoms for all without distinction as to race, sex, language, or religion;"

According to the Charter, the jurisdiction of the United Nations is to provide cooperation among the nations, and not act as an international government. The UN Charter paved the way for the drafting of the UDHR. The UDHR aims to promote "universal respect for, and the observance of, human rights." Thus, the UDHR is merely a declaration for each signatory to adopt to its own political system. The significance of the UDHR as stated in its Preamble is:

"Whereas a common understanding of these rights and freedoms is of the greatest importance for the full realization of this pledge."

As a signatory to the UDHR, the Philippines then declares an understanding and adherence of these fundamental and inalienable rights to its population. The Philippines has adhered to the UDHR through the Bill of Rights, and continued to create laws and policies that cater to a specific sector, like the Labor Code and the Indigenous Peoples' Rights.

Besides the UDHR, the Philippines is a signatory to 8 of the 9 UN core human rights treaties, namely:

1. The International Convention on the Elimination of Racial Discrimination or (ICERD), ratified on September 15, 1967,
2. The International Covenant on Economic, Social and Cultural Rights or (ICESR), ratified on June 7, 1974,
3. The Convention on the Elimination of All Forms of Discrimination Against Women or (CEDAW), ratified on August 5, 1981,
4. The Convention Against Torture and other Cruel, Inhuman or Degrading Treatment or Punishment or (CAT), acceded to on June 18, 1986,
5. The International Covenant on Civil and Political Rights or (ICCPR), ratified on October 23, 1986,
6. The Convention on the Rights of the Child or (CRC), ratified on August 21, 1990,
7. The International Convention on the Protection of the Rights of All Migrant Workers and Members of their Families or (CMW), ratified on July 5, 1995, and
8. The Convention on the Rights of Persons with Disabilities or (CRPD), ratified April 15, 2008.

The Philippines was re-elected through the vote of 165 separate States out of 192 to the 47-member UN Human Rights Council during the 73rd Session of the UN General Assembly on October 12, 2018.

The country is a party to the Geneva Conventions, which set standards for humanitarian conduct in times of war and local or international armed conflict.

The Philippines is a member of the ASEAN Intergovernmental Commission on Human Rights and is party to the ASEAN Human Rights Declaration.

The Philippines was a state party to the Rome Statute until its withdrawal, which took effect in March 2019. The Philippines retained its obligation to cooperate in International Criminal Court investigations into possible crimes against humanity committed up to the time the withdrawal took effect.

== Proposed legislation ==
House Bill No. 10576, also known as the Human Rights Defenders Protection Act, was passed by the Philippine House of Representatives in 2022. In the Senate, Senators Leila de Lima and Risa Hontiveros filed Senate Bill No. 179. The bill has been pending in the committee level since 2019.

Human rights advocates from the Philippines and the international community have called on Philippine lawmakers to pass the measure to protect human rights workers in the country. United Nations Special Rapporteur on Human Rights Defenders Mary Lawlor supported the proposed law, citing the need to comply with global treaties and standards and expressing concern over the red-tagging, judicial harassment, and killings of human rights workers in the country.

In the House of Representatives, Representative Lagman filed House Bill 77, while the Makabayan bloc (which includes Kabataan Representative Raoul Manuel, ACT Teachers Representative France Castro, and Gabriela Representative Arlene Brosas) filed House Bills 256 and 2484. The proposed laws sought to protect the rights and freedoms of human rights workers.

== Commemorations ==
The Philippines, through the Commission of Human Rights, the Bangsamoro Human Rights Commission, and other human rights organizations, commemorates International Human Rights Day on December 10 every year.

Philippine human rights groups and relatives of the disappeared observe the International Day of the Disappeared every year on August 30.

== See also ==
- Extrajudicial killings and forced disappearances in the Philippines
- Ladlad
- LGBT rights in the Philippines
- Women's rights in the Philippines
- Security sector governance and reform in the Philippines
- Dicamay Agta language
