= DZVX =

Defunct radio station in Camarines Norte, Philippines

- Daet; Philippines
- Broadcast area: Camarines Norte and surrounding areas
- Frequency: 1269 kHz

Programming
- Format: Silent

Ownership
- Owner: Bombo Radyo Philippines; (Newsounds Broadcasting Network, Inc.)

History
- First air date: July 5, 1971
- Last air date: March 19, 2008

Technical information
- Licensing authority: NTC

Links
- Website: www.bomboradyo.com

DZVX (1269 AM) was a radio station owned and operated by Bombo Radyo Philippines through its licensee Newsounds Broadcasting Network.

== History ==
DZVX was the pioneer radio station in Camarines Norte. It was established in 1971 by the family of Don Fernando Vinzons for political purposes. Later on, it expanded its scope. The station was transferred to new management in the 1990s under the banner of Bombo Radyo Philippines. DZVX Bombo Radyo was the number one station in the area during the 1990s and 2000s. It went off the air in 2008.
