= Helwer =

Helwer is a surname. Notable people with the surname include:

- Ed Helwer (born 1940), Canadian politician
- Reg Helwer, Canadian politician

== See also ==
- Helwerthia
