= DWIC =

Tuguegarao; Philippines
- Broadcast area: Cagayan and surrounding areas
- Frequency: 93.3 MHz

Programming
- Format: Silent

Ownership
- Owner: Bombo Radyo Philippines; (Newsounds Broadcasting Network, Inc.)
- Sister stations: DZGR Bombo Radyo

History
- First air date: June 29, 1992
- Last air date: March 31, 2004

Technical information
- Licensing authority: NTC

DWIC (93.3 FM) was a radio station owned and operated by Bombo Radyo Philippines through its licensee Newsounds Broadcasting Network, Inc. It was formerly known as Star FM from its inception on June 29, 1992, to March 31, 2004, when it went off air due to financial losses. The frequency is currently owned by ACWS-United Broadcasting Network.
