= 801 AM =

AM radio frequency

The following radio stations broadcast on AM frequency 801 kHz:

== Australia ==
- VL4QY at Cairns, Queensland
- VL5RM at Berri, South Australia

== China ==
- GRT Pearl River Economic Radio in Maoming

== North Korea ==
- Pyongyang Broadcasting Station (평양방송), Kimchaek

== Philippines ==
- DXES at General Santos
- DYKA at San Jose
- DZNC at Cauayan

== United States ==
Call sign	City of license	Facility ID	Class	Unlimited power (kW)	Transmitter coordinates
KTWG	Agana, Guam	67503	B	10	13.451944°N 144.708889°E
