= Christopher Guarin =

Filipino journalist

- Born: c. 1970
- Died: January 5, 2012 (Age 41); General Santos, Philippines
- Cause of death: Gunshot wounds
- Resting place: Holy Garden Matutum Memorial Park, Polomolok, South Cotabato
- Occupations: Publisher, radio station manager and commentator
- Employer(s): Tatak (tabloid newspaper); Bombo Radyo & RGMA Super Radyo; and Radio Mindanao Network (block timer)
- Spouse: Lyn Guarin
- Children: 1 daughter

Christopher Guarin (c. 1970 – January 5, 2012) was a Filipino journalist—an AM radio block timer show host and a local tabloid publisher and editor-in-chief—murdered in General Santos, Philippines. Guarin was the 150th Filipino journalist to have been killed since the democratic revolution of 1986.

== Personal life ==
Christopher Guarin was around 41 years old when he was killed. He was married to Lyn Guarin and the couple had a nine-year-old daughter. Guarin was interred in Holy Garden Matutum Memorial Park cemetery in on January 15, 2012.

== Career ==
Christopher Guarin was a veteran radio journalist in the General Santos media market. He once managed dxBB-FM of RGMA Super Radyo and had been a commentator for dyWB Bombo Radyo. In 2010, he ran unsuccessfully for city councilor. At the time of his murder, he was a block-time radio commentator on dxMD (AM), Radio Mindanao Network (its AM stations are also known collectively as Radyo Mo Nationwide) and the publisher and editor-in-chief for Tatak Bigtime News, a local tabloid newspaper. Tatak is among five large circulating newspapers in General Santos.

== Death ==
General Santos is in the Philippines shown here relative to the capital Manila.

Christopher Guarin was attacked and killed on January 5, 2012. Earlier in the day, Guarin received a death threat and during his radio program, he read the threat aloud. The message read, "Do not leave the station, I will kill you." Guarin had received death threats before. That evening while he was driving near Lagao with his wife and nine-year-old daughter to their home, a team of two hit men riding on a single Honda XRM motorcycle shot at Guarin's vehicle. Guarin was able to drive further after those first shots. According to his wife, he then stopped and escaped from the KIA Pride to direct the gunshots away from his family, and finally he begged for his life before being killed by the attackers. The hit men fired between five and seven shots with one of those bullets to the head. Guarin was killed at about 10:30 p.m. on the same day he had been threatened on Conel Road. The hit men inflicted a minor injury on Guarin's wife during the attack. The police said the child was safe, unharmed but "traumatized." According to the Committee to Protect Journalists, Guarin was killed because of his journalism and he was the first journalist killed in 2012.

== Investigation ==
Guarin himself had been a subject in the investigation of a rival newspaper's circulation manager in late 2011 but was cleared of any wrongdoing by police.

The investigation of Christopher Guarin's murder began with the formation of Task Force Gaurin. Police told journalists that Guarin's murder was motivated by business rather than his reporting, although police gave no more information. Journalists raised and offered a monetary reward for more information about the attackers.

From Lyn Guarin's identification of an alleged shooter of her husband from files, police filed murder charges against suspect Marvin Palabrica on February 1, 2012, and then initiated a manhunt to locate him. Police continued to investigate further for information about an accomplice and a mastermind. After one year the case was still unsolved.

== Context ==
After Christopher Guarin's high-profile murder by a team of two hit men working together on motorcycle, police announced that they were stopping such motorcycles at checkpoints and would crack down on the practice by looking for violations. This followed 1,819 murders in 2010 and a rise of 2,089 in 2011. The next media worker or journalist killed in General Santos was Romel Palma, who was a driver for journalists at dxMC Bombo Radyo-Koronadal, and he was killed outside of a hospital on April 30, 2012.

== Impact ==
The National Union of Journalists in the Philippines (NUJP) pointed out that Christopher Guarin was the 150th journalist killed since 1986 and the 10th of those killed in General Santos. The Newseum counted 2,246 journalists who had died worldwide since 1837 the year Guarin was killed. While the Philippines has been identified as the deadliest country for journalists and media workers, the heaviest burden has fallen on those from General Santos. Out of 150 journalists killed in the Philippines since the 1986 revolution, 24 of those were General Santos' journalists. This includes 14 journalists from the General Santos area who were killed at the Maguindanao massacre, Mindanao on November 23, 2009. General Santos is located in the south of the Mindanao island. The Amapatuan massacre is known worldwide as the deadliest event ever and 32 journalists were killed there. Prior to that, Jonathan Abayon from RGMA Super Radyo and Ely Binoya from Radyo Natin Network were both killed in General Santos in 2004. Dennis Cuesta, who like Gaurin was with Radio Mindanao Network's DxMD, was killed in 2008. Two months before Guarin's murder, Alfredo Velarde Jr, circulation manager for the tabloid Brigada News, was killed in a parked car outside of his office on November 11, 2011, and Guarin was a subject in that investigation but cleared of any wrongdoing by police. The number of journalists killed in the Philippines had risen sharply as four were killed in 2010 and eight in 2011.

== Reactions ==
Journalists demanded justice for Christopher Guarin and other victims from the profession. The Freedom Fund for Filipino Journalists reacted to Guarin's murder stating it was "one more indication of the persistence of the culture of impunity that encourages the killing of journalists and media workers in the Philippines." Nestor P. Burgos Jr, NUJP head, said, "His death is a stark reminder that impunity in the country remains very much alive, fostered by the glaring lack of inaction, even apathy, by government, belying President Benigno Aquino III's pledge of justice and respect for rights in his quest for 'tuwid na daan' (translated: "all out justice)." Journalists raised a reward of US$2,000 (P88,000) and this was supplemented by a private donation of another US$500 (P20,000).

Irina Bokova, director-general of UNESCO, said, "This crime joins the long list of journalists that have been killed in the country since last year," said Bokova. "Journalists who cover news in the Philippines should be able to work safely in order to provide citizens with free information and nourish an informed debate." A statement from the International Federation of Journalists "condemned the killing", and said, the "IFJ is deeply concerned that 2012 has begun with a continuation of increased attacks on media professionals that we saw in the Philippines in 2011". The organization further called upon President Benigno S. Aquino III, son of former president Corazon Aquino to keep his promise and take steps to end impunity.

The official statement from the president's office read, "The case is now under investigation. The Philippine National Police (PNP) has identified leads and they are in hot pursuit. We will expect the PNP to apprehend the suspects. And again, we condemn the extra-legal killing of another journalist."

Later the deputy spokesperson for the president told any threatened journalists to seek out their police or report to the Interior and Local Government representative and that risk maps and databases were set up so that when a journalist would receive a threat, it could be taken seriously and would be tracked down. One year later, the local NUJP chapter of General Santos, Edwin Espejo said, "Today, we urge the Aquino government to give justice to Guarin's killing and rest of our slain colleagues who died in the line of duty. Only the arrest, prosecution and conviction of media murderers and their masterminds can erase the image of the country as one of the world's deadliest places for the working journalists."

== See also ==
- Center for Media Freedom and Responsibility (Philippines)
- List of unsolved murders (2000–present)
