= DYFM =

DYFM may refer to:

- DYFM-AM, an AM radio station broadcasting in Iloilo City, branded as Bombo Radyo
- DYFM-FM, an FM radio station broadcasting in Cebu City, branded as True FM
