= DZLG =

Radio station in Legazpi, Philippines

Bombo Radyo Legazpi (DZLG)
- Legazpi; Philippines
- Broadcast area: Albay and surrounding areas
- Frequency: 927 kHz
- Branding: DZLG Bombo Radyo

Programming
- Languages: Albayanon, Filipino
- Format: News, Public Affairs, Talk, Drama
- Network: Bombo Radyo

Ownership
- Owner: Bombo Radyo Philippines; (People's Broadcasting Service, Inc.)

History
- First air date: December 14, 1997
- Call sign meaning: Legazpi

Technical information
- Licensing authority: NTC
- Power: 10,000 watts
- Transmitter coordinates: 13°09′00″N 123°44′34″E

Links
- Webcast: Listen Live
- Website: Bombo Radyo Legazpi

DZLG (927 AM) Bombo Radyo is a radio station owned and operated by Bombo Radyo Philippines through its licensee People's Broadcasting Service. Its studio and transmitter are located at Bombo Radyo Broadcast Center, Tahao Rd., Central City Subd., Legazpi, Albay.
