= DZGR =

Bombo Radyo Tuguegarao (DZGR)
- Tuguegarao; Philippines
- Broadcast area: Northern Cagayan Valley and surrounding areas
- Frequency: 891 kHz
- Branding: DZGR Bombo Radyo

Programming
- Languages: Ibanag, Filipino
- Format: News, Public Affairs, Talk, Drama
- Network: Bombo Radyo

Ownership
- Owner: Bombo Radyo Philippines; (People's Broadcasting Service, Inc.)
- Sister stations: 93.3 Star FM

History
- First air date: June 8, 1996

Technical information
- Licensing authority: NTC
- Power: 10,000 watts

Links
- Webcast: Listen Live
- Website: Bombo Radyo Tuguegarao

DZGR (891 AM) Bombo Radyo is a radio station owned and operated by Bombo Radyo Philippines through its licensee People's Broadcasting Service. Its studio, offices and transmitter are located at Bombo Radyo Broadcast Center, Taft St. Ext., Brgy. Centro 5, Tuguegarao.
