= DZWN =

Radio station in Dagupan, Philippines

Bombo Radyo Dagupan (DZWN)
- Dagupan; Philippines
- Broadcast area: Pangasinan and surrounding areas
- Frequency: 1125 kHz
- Branding: DZWN Bombo Radyo

Programming
- Languages: Pangasinense, Filipino
- Format: News, Public Affairs, Talk, Drama
- Network: Bombo Radyo

Ownership
- Owner: Bombo Radyo Philippines; (People's Broadcasting Service, Inc.)
- Sister stations: 100.7 Star FM

History
- First air date: 1980

Technical information
- Licensing authority: NTC
- Power: 10,000 watts

Links
- Webcast: Listen Live
- Website: Bombo Radyo Dagupan

DZWN (1125 AM) Bombo Radyo is a radio station owned and operated by Bombo Radyo Philippines through its licensee People's Broadcasting Service. Its studio and transmitter are located at Bombo Radyo Broadcast Center, Maramba Bankers Village, Brgy. Bonuan Catacdang, Dagupan.
