= DWHY =

Radio station in Dagupan, Philippines

Star FM Dagupan (DWHY)
Dagupan; Philippines
- Broadcast area: Pangasinan and surrounding areas
- Frequency: 100.7 MHz
- Branding: 100.7 Star FM

Programming
- Languages: English, Pangasinense, Filipino
- Format: Contemporary MOR, OPM, News
- Network: Star FM

Ownership
- Owner: Bombo Radyo Philippines; (People's Broadcasting Service, Inc.)
- Sister stations: DZWN Bombo Radyo

History
- First air date: 1992

Technical information
- Licensing authority: NTC
- Power: 10,000 watts
- ERP: 30,000 watts

Links
- Webcast: Listen Live
- Website: Star FM Dagupan

DWHY (100.7 FM), broadcasting as 100.7 Star FM, is a radio station owned and operated by Bombo Radyo Philippines through its licensee People's Broadcasting Service, Inc. Its studio, offices and transmitter are located at the Bombo Radyo Broadcast Center, Maramba Bankers Village, Brgy. Bonuan Catacdang, Dagupan.
