= DZVV =

Radio station in Vigan

Bombo Radyo Vigan (DZVV)
- Vigan; Philippines
- Broadcast area: Ilocos Sur, Abra and surrounding areas
- Frequency: 603 kHz
- Branding: DZVV Bombo Radyo

Programming
- Languages: Ilocano, Filipino
- Format: News, Public Affairs, Talk
- Network: Bombo Radyo

Ownership
- Owner: Bombo Radyo Philippines; (People's Broadcasting Service, Inc.)

History
- First air date: 1967
- Former frequencies: 570 kHz (1967-1978); 585 kHz (1978-1986)
- Call sign meaning: Voice of Vigan

Technical information
- Licensing authority: NTC
- Power: 5,000 watts
- ERP: 10,000 watts

Links
- Webcast: Listen Live
- Website: Bombo Radyo Vigan

DZVV (603 AM) Bombo Radyo is a radio station owned and operated by Bombo Radyo Philippines through its licensee People's Broadcasting Service. Its studio, offices and transmitter are located at Bombo Radyo Broadcast Center, Brgy. Tamag, Vigan, a stone's throw away from the University of Northern Philippines.

== History ==
DZVV started broadcasting in 1967 at its former home along General Luna St., which is the current site of a private school. Its former transmitter tower was located along the banks of the Govantes River, near the boundary between Vigan and Bantay (its base can be seen to this day in its original location). The station launched the careers of radio personalities Danny Tajon, Heny Tabangcura, and the late Gil Ballesteros.

In 1984, the station moved to its present location in Brgy. Tamag, a few years after Bombo Radyo acquired the station. A few years later, it moved its frequency from 585 kHz AM to 603 kHz AM for better signal reception.

For five decades, even back in the days when the feared "Saka-saka" armies sowed terror and burned villages during Ilocos Sur's Dark Era; and even the Martial Law era, DZVV is already a household name, recognized and respected for its fearless views and commentaries. This penchant of theirs once caused their station to be strafed by these "Saka-saka" armed groups.
