= DZSO =

Bombo Radyo La Union (DZSO)
- San Fernando; Philippines
- Broadcast area: La Union, Benguet and surrounding areas
- Frequency: 720 kHz
- Branding: DZSO Bombo Radyo

Programming
- Languages: Ilocano, Filipino
- Format: News, Public Affairs, Talk, Drama
- Network: Bombo Radyo

Ownership
- Owner: Bombo Radyo Philippines; (Newsounds Broadcasting Network, Inc.)

History
- First air date: 1985
- Call sign meaning: San Fernando

Technical information
- Licensing authority: NTC
- Power: 5,000 watts
- Transmitter coordinates: 16°35′52″N 120°18′57″E

Links
- Webcast: Listen Live
- Website: Bombo Radyo La Union

DZSO (720 AM) Bombo Radyo is a radio station owned and operated by Bombo Radyo Philippines through its licensee Newsounds Broadcasting Network. Its studio and transmitter are located at Bombo Radyo Broadcast Center, Pennsylvania Ave., Parian, San Fernando, La Union.
