= DWSM =

Radio station in Metro Manila, Philippines

Star FM Manila (DWSM)
- Pasig; Philippines
- Broadcast area: Mega Manila and surrounding areas
- Frequency: 102.7 MHz
- RDS: Star FM
- Branding: 102.7 Star FM

Programming
- Languages: Filipino, English
- Format: Contemporary MOR, OPM, News
- Network: Star FM

Ownership
- Owner: Bombo Radyo Philippines; (People's Broadcasting Service, Inc.)

History
- First air date: 1978
- Former call signs: DWXB (1978–1987)
- Former names: Magic Disco 102 (1978–1982); Cute 102 (1982–1983); WXB 102 (1983-June 9, 1987); 102.7 WSM (1987-March 30, 1994)
- Call sign meaning: Salome and Marcelino Florete

Technical information
- Licensing authority: NTC
- Class: C, D, E
- Power: 25,000 watts
- ERP: 50,000 watts

Links
- Webcast: Listen Live
- Website: Star FM Manila

DWSM (102.7 FM), broadcasting as 102.7 Star FM, is a radio station owned and operated by Bombo Radyo Philippines through its licensee People's Broadcasting Service, Inc. Its studio, offices and transmitter are located at Unit D, 18th floor, Strata 2000, F. Ortigas Jr. Ave., Ortigas Center, Pasig. Its news center, which hosts Bombo Radyo's flagship national newscast Bombo Network News, is located at Florete Bldg., 2406 Nobel cor. Edison Sts., Makati.

As of Q4 2022, 102.7 Star FM is the 8th most-listened to FM radio station (and #6 among masa stations) in Metro Manila, based on a survey commissioned by Kantar Media Philippines and Kapisanan ng mga Brodkaster ng Pilipinas.

== History ==
=== 1978–1987: WXB ===
The station began in 1978 as DWXB, branded as Magic Disco 102 with a disco format, owned by the National Council of Churches in the Philippines and based at Philippine Christian University along Taft Avenue, Manila. In 1982, Universal Broadcasting Network acquired it, rebranding as Cute 102 with a Top 40 format and relocating to Donada St. (near the Rizal Memorial Coliseum), Pasay.

A year later, it became WXB 102, gradually shifting to new wave and fully adopting the genre by 1985. Despite its low 1-kilowatt signal, it gained a cult following and helped launch local rock acts like The Dawn, Identity Crisis, and Violent Playground, briefly competing with Power 105 BM FM. (now known as 105.1 Brigada News FM Manila) WXB 102 ceased operations on June 9, 1987, after its studio was sequestered during the Corazon Aquino administration’s crackdown on Marcos-linked assets. Its spiritual successor, NU 107, launched on October 31, 1987, under Progressive Broadcasting Corporation.

=== 1987–1994: The Gentle Wind ===
Bombo Radyo Philippines acquired the station, changed its call letters to DWSM, and rebranded it as 102.7 WSM The Gentle Wind. The station adopted an easy listening format and significantly boosted its transmitter power to 25 kilowatts, greatly expanding its reach. Operations were based at the Philippine Communications Center (PHILCOMCEN) building in Pasig, which was later demolished in 2015. Despite the upgrades, the station went off the air on March 30, 1994.

=== 1994–present: Star FM ===
On April 22, 1994, Bombo Radyo Philippines rebranded the station as 102.7 Star FM, pioneering the "masa" format in FM radio - a mix of popular music, entertainment, and news aimed at the broader public. The revamped programming included Bombo Network News, which airs every morning, noon, and evening from Monday to Saturday (and on Sundays for major breaking stories). Notable programs included It's All For You (Morning/Afternoon/Evening editions), Star Sweep, and Twilight Zone.

On February 24, 2013, Star FM relocated its studios from the EGI Building in Taft, Pasay to Strata 2000 in Pasig, aligning with modern broadcast standards.
