= DYIN =

Radio station in the Philippines

Bombo Radyo Kalibo (DYIN)
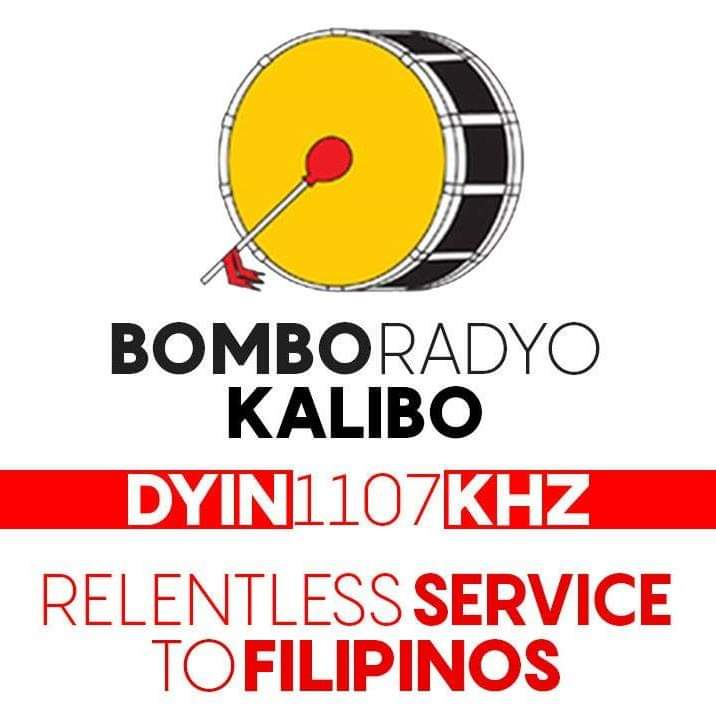
- Kalibo; Philippines
- Broadcast area: Northwestern Panay and surrounding areas
- Frequency: 1107 kHz
- Branding: DYIN Bombo Radyo

Programming
- Languages: Akeanon, Filipino
- Format: News, Public Affairs, Talk, Drama
- Network: Bombo Radyo

Ownership
- Owner: Bombo Radyo Philippines; (People's Broadcasting Service, Inc.)

History
- First air date: March 20, 1997

Technical information
- Licensing authority: NTC
- Power: 5,000 watts

Links
- Webcast: Listen Live
- Website: Bombo Radyo Kalibo

DYIN (1107 AM) Bombo Radyo is a radio station owned and operated by Bombo Radyo Philippines through its licensee People's Broadcasting Service. Its studio is located at Bombo Radyo Broadcast Center, Oyo Torong St. cor. J. Magno St., Kalibo, and its transmitter is located at Brgy. Bachaw Sur, Kalibo.
