= Flight 801 =

Flight 801 may refer to

- Líneas Aéreas La Urraca Flight 801, hijacked on 20 June 1969; see 1969 in aviation
- Mexicana de Aviación Flight 801, crashed on 21 September 1969
- Malév Flight 801A, crashed on 15 January 1975
- Transbrasil Flight 801, crashed on 21 March 1989
- Korean Air Flight 801, crashed on 6 August 1997

== See also ==
- TWA Flight 801, a series of mixtapes by Charles Hamilton; see Charles Hamilton discography
- 801 (disambiguation)
