= DYOW =

Radio station in the Philippines

Bombo Radyo Roxas (DYOW)
- Roxas City; Philippines
- Frequency: 900 kHz
- Branding: DYOW Bombo Radyo

Programming
- Languages: Capiznon, Filipino
- Format: News, Public Affairs, Talk, Drama
- Network: Bombo Radyo

Ownership
- Owner: Bombo Radyo Philippines; (People's Broadcasting Service, Inc.)
- Sister stations: 103.7 Star FM

History
- First air date: January 1, 1993

Technical information
- Licensing authority: NTC
- Power: 5,000 watts

Links
- Webcast: Listen Live
- Website: Bombo Radyo Roxas

DYOW (900 AM) Bombo Radyo is a radio station owned and operated by Bombo Radyo Philippines through its licensee People's Broadcasting Service. Its studio and transmitter are located at Bombo Radyo Broadcast Center, Arnaldo Blvd., Roxas City.
