= Rubylita Garcia =

Filipino radio host and journalist

- Born: ca. 1962; Manila, Philippines
- Died: April 6, 2014 (aged 51–52); Bacoor, Cavite, Philippines
- Cause of death: Gunshot wound
- Resting place: Trinity Garden, Bacoor
- Occupations: Radio Host, Reporter, Journalist
- Employer(s): Remate, dwAD
- Children: 1

Rubylita Garcia (ca. 1962 – April 6, 2014) was a Filipino host for a local radio talk show on channel dwAD and a journalist for the daily tabloid Remate in Bacoor, Philippines. She reported on corruption in the Philippines. She was murdered in 2014.

== Personal ==
Rubylita Garcia was a 52-year-old widow who had one son, Tristan, and a granddaughter. She was buried in Trinity Garden in her hometown of Bacoor after a Mass at the St. Michael Church.

== Career ==
Garcia was a reporter for over 25 years. She was an investigative journalist reporting for Remate and the Pilipino Times and also worked for the radio station dwAD in Cavite province. Garcia was president of a journalists' group in Calabarzon called the Confederation of Active Media Practitioners Organization. She was also a member of the National Press Club of the Philippines.

== Death ==
She was gunned down by two men in front of her ten-year-old granddaughter, son, and sister-in-law in her home in Bacoor. Before she died, she said that the local police chief was the only one who wanted her dead, no conviction has been made however, only a temporary relief of duty. She died on the way to the hospital and her family members were not physically harmed.

The Philippine National Police formed a special investigation task force, but no one was captured. One of the suspects was witnessed to be about 6 foot tall, in his thirties, with a tattoo of a cross on his neck and a tattoo on his arm. A man was arrested during a busy bust operation in Cavite City, but further examination of the suspect from a witness declared that this was not one of the men who murdered Garcia. No further reports have been made to the capture of these gunmen.

== Context ==
From 2001 to 2014, 115 reported media workers have been killed in the Philippines. 48 of these were work-related murders while only 36 were filed in court. Under Philippines President Benigno Aquino III's administration there have been 27 media killings from 2010 to 2014, 11 were work related while 16 were non-work related. Out of the 11 work related murders, Garcia was the only person who was murdered in 2014 while 6 people were murdered in 2013. The Philippines is ranked the 3rd worst country for journalists in CPJ's impunity index.

== Impact ==
Irina Bokova, who is the director-general of UNESCO, said, "I condemn the murder of Rubylita Garcia. It is essential that the authorities of the Philippines do all they can to identify and bring to trial those responsible for this cowardly crime. Murderers cannot be allowed to set limits to journalists’ freedom of expression or on citizens’ rights to information."

The National Press Club along with many other of the Philippines’ largest media organizations, mourned Garcia's death. Garcia's death added to the journalistic turmoil in the Philippines, which resulted in many media practitioners having increased dissatisfaction and disappointment with the Aquino government's ability to rectify and prevent media killings.

== Reactions ==
Bacoor's mayor Strike B. Revilla offered a P50,000 reward for anyone who would solve the case of Garcia's murder. Later, the reward was raised to P100,000 and was then raised again to P150,000 by Alab ng Mamamahayag (ALAM). This group rallied at the Cavite police headquarters, protesting their concerns of how long it was taking to investigate Garcia's case. Funeral marchers carrying Garcia's casket during “A Walk For Justice” adopted the slogan “Justice for Ruby Garcia” and had it printed on their T-shirts which they wore while marching.

== See also ==
- Human rights in the Philippines
- List of unsolved murders (2000–present)
