= 801 Squadron =

801 Squadron may refer to

- 801 Naval Air Squadron, Fleet Air Arm squadron of the Royal Navy
- 801st Radar Squadron, United States Air Force unit
- 801st Aero Repair Squadron, now 107th Fighter Squadron

== See also ==
- 801 T.T.S. Airbats, a Japanese anime featuring the eponymous fictional 801 squadron
- 801 (disambiguation)
