= DYTX =

Radio station in Tacloban, Philippines

Bombo Radyo Tacloban (DYTX)
- Tacloban; Philippines
- Broadcast area: Northern Leyte, southern Samar, Biliran
- Frequency: 95.1 MHz
- Branding: DYTX Bombo Radyo

Programming
- Languages: Waray, Filipino
- Format: News, Public Affairs, Talk, Drama
- Network: Bombo Radyo

Ownership
- Owner: Bombo Radyo Philippines; (Newsounds Broadcasting Network, Inc.)

History
- First air date: 1989 (on AM); April 4, 2005 (on FM)
- Former call signs: DYWR (1989–2003)
- Former frequencies: 594 kHz (1989-2003)

Technical information
- Licensing authority: NTC
- Power: 10,000 watts
- ERP: 32,800 watts

Links
- Webcast: Listen Live
- Website: Bombo Radyo Tacloban

DYTX (95.1 FM) Bombo Radyo is a radio station owned and operated by Bombo Radyo Philippines through its licensee Newsounds Broadcasting Network. Its studio and transmitter are located at Bombo Radyo Broadcast Center, 3rd Floor, Infinitea Bldg., Paterno St., Brgy. 26, Tacloban.

== History ==
Bombo Radyo was launched in 1989 under the callsign DYWR on 594 AM. On March 12, 2003, Bombo Radyo went off the air due to financial losses brought by a downtrend in the network's income for the past 5 years.

On April 4, 2005, the station returned on air, this time on 95.1 FM, which was formerly known as The Gentle Wind from 1989 to 1994 and Star FM from 1994 to 2004.
