= DZWX =

Radio station in Baguio, Philippines

Bombo Radyo Baguio (DZWX)
- Baguio; Philippines
- Broadcast area: Benguet, La Union and surrounding areas
- Frequency: 1035 kHz
- Branding: DZWX Bombo Radyo

Programming
- Languages: Ilocano, Filipino
- Format: News, Public Affairs, Talk, Drama
- Network: Bombo Radyo

Ownership
- Owner: Bombo Radyo Philippines; (People's Broadcasting Service, Inc.)
- Sister stations: 89.5 Star FM

History
- First air date: 1970
- Former frequencies: 1040 kHz (1970–1978)

Technical information
- Licensing authority: NTC
- Power: 5,000 watts
- Transmitter coordinates: 16°24′37″N 120°35′01″E

Links
- Webcast: Listen Live
- Website: Bombo Radyo Baguio

DZWX (1035 AM) Bombo Radyo is a radio station owned and operated by Bombo Radyo Philippines through its licensee People's Broadcasting Service. Its studio and offices are located at Bombo Radyo Broadcast Center, #87 Lourdes Subdivision Rd., Baguio, while its transmitter is located at Tam-awan, Brgy. Pinsao, Baguio.

DZWX was formerly the home of Bombo Radyo Drama Production Center, which was spun off in the early 90s as Saleng Productions Company. Saleng still supplied dramas to the station until 2016, when Remy Balderas retired. Luvlet Artists and Talent Center, owned by couple Luvimin Aquino Sr. and Letty Astudillo-Aquino, currently supplies drama programming to Ilocano-speaking Bombo Radyo stations in Northern Luzon.
