= DZVR =

Bombo Radyo Laoag (DZVR)
- Laoag; Philippines
- Broadcast area: Ilocos Norte and surrounding areas
- Frequency: 711 kHz
- Branding: DZVR Bombo Radyo

Programming
- Languages: Ilocano, Filipino
- Format: News, Public Affairs, Talk, Drama
- Network: Bombo Radyo

Ownership
- Owner: Bombo Radyo Philippines; (Newsounds Broadcasting Network, Inc.)
- Sister stations: 104.3 Star FM

History
- First air date: 1967
- Former frequencies: 700 kHz (1967–1978)

Technical information
- Licensing authority: NTC
- Power: 5,000 watts

Links
- Webcast: Listen Live
- Website: Bombo Radyo Laoag

DZVR (711 AM) Bombo Radyo is a radio station owned and operated by Bombo Radyo Philippines through its licensee Newsounds Broadcasting Network. Its studio, offices and transmitter are located at Bombo Radyo Broadcast Center, Brgy. Cabungaan North, Laoag.

DZVR was formerly owned by Northern Broadcasting Company from its inception in 1967 until 1989, when it was acquired by Bombo Radyo.
