= Larry Que =

Filipino journalist

Larry S. Que
- Born: ca. 1963
- Died: December 20, 2016 (aged 54); Virac, Catanduanes, Philippines
- Cause of death: Gun shot
- Other name: Uktoy
- Occupations: Publisher; Journalist; Business owner
- Years active
- Employer: Catanduanes News Now
- Spouse: Edralyn Pangilinan

Larry Que, also known as Uktoy, (ca. 1963 – December 20, 2016), was a Filipino publisher and journalist for the Catanduanes News Now newspaper. He was killed two weeks after he had written an article linking government officials to a major drug seizure of methamphetamine, locally known as shabu, in the town of Virac in Catanduanes, Philippines.

The killing of Que is the first recorded media-related killing under the administration of President Rodrigo Duterte.

== Personal life ==
Larry Que was married to Edralyn Pangilinan. He was well known within the Virac community and ran unsuccessfully for Mayor in May 2016.

== Career ==
Que was a journalist for many years. He had just begun to publish the local newspaper Catanduanes News Now at the time of his killing. He was also the owner of an insurance agency, called Liberty Insurance Company, in Virac, as well as several other business. In May 2016 Que unsuccessfully ran for mayor of his hometown Virac.

== Death ==
Mentioned locations within Philippines relative to the capital Manila.

In the weeks prior to his killing, Que published an article about a recent drug bust conducted by police in Catanduanes, Philippines. The drug bust was the biggest the Philippines had ever seen. The article claimed that there was "official negligence" within the investigation and that Chinese nationals may have been behind the meth laboratory.

Que was killed by two men on a motorcycle. The gunman wore a bonnet, helmet, and raincoat, while another accomplice drove the motorcycle. During the shooting, Que took a bullet to the head. The shooting took place in front of his insurance business office the morning of Monday December 19, 2016. Que died early the next morning from the gunshot injuries obtained during the shooting.

Que's wife later blamed the newly elected governor and a mayor for "grave misconduct and nonfeasance."

The investigation by the National Bureau of Investigation has yet to solve the killing of Que.

=== Context ===
After publishing an article, that shed light on a recent drug bust, which was the largest meth operation the country has ever seen. In the article Que claimed that the local authorities were negligent within the investigation.

According to CNN Philippines, President Rodrigo Duterte sent the community many different messages relating to his governments commitment to protect journalists. Before taking the oath to become the countries president, Duterte said, "Just because you're a journalist you are not exempted from assassination, if you're a son of a bitch. Freedom of expression cannot help you if you have done something wrong." A Presidential Task Force on Violations of the Right to Life, Liberty and Security of the Members of the Media was established by Duterte in October to improve security of journalists.

=== Impact ===
According to the Committee to Protect Journalists the Philippines are the third deadliest place for journalist with 77 reported killings of journalist since 1992. Que was one of among three Filipino journalists to have been killed in 2016.

Larry Que was the first journalist in the Philippines to be killed under the President Duterte administration. Another journalist, Jinky Tabor, who wrote about the same drug bust and witnessed the raids of the laboratory, also received death threats.

Dabet Panelo, secretary general of National Union of Journalists of the Philippines, said, "It should be stressed that the murder of Que is not the first assault on journalists under the current administration." On Inauguration day an attempt was made in Surigao City on the life of journalist Saturnino Estanio of dxRS. An attempt was made on the life of journalist Virgilio Maganes of Dagupan in November 2016.

=== Reactions ===
Irina Bokova, director general of UNESCO, said, "I call on the authorities to do all they can to bring those responsible for this crime to trial. Journalists must be able to work under safe conditions to ensure the free flow of information. It is vital for society as a whole that their safety be protected."

Anthony Bellanger, general secretary of the International Federation of Journalists, said, "We deplore the brutal murder of Larry Que in the Philippines yesterday. Que's murder demonstrates the increasing challenges that journalists in the Philippines face reporting on drugs. Action needs to be taken by the Duterte administration to guarantee the safety and security of the media across the country, and work to strengthen the freedom of the press to report on stories of public interest."

The National Union of Journalists of the Philippines' public message to the Duterte administration included an appeal to "end its penchant of falsely blaming media for deliberately misinterpreting its often inconsistent and incoherent messages and instead working on making its communications crystal-clear."

== See also ==
- Extrajudicial killings and forced disappearances in the Philippines
- Human rights in the Philippines
