= WXB 102 =

Internet radio station

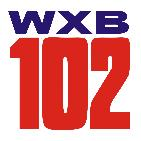

Manila; Philippines
- Broadcast area: Worldwide through the Internet
- Branding: DWXB Magic Disco 102 (1978–1982); Cute 102 (1982–1983); WXB 102 (1983–1987, 2005-present)

Programming
- Format: New wave, punk rock, post-punk, and other related genres

Ownership
- Owner: National Council of Churches in the Philippines (1978–1982); Universal Broadcasting Corporation (1982–1987); Sutton Records (2005–present)

History
- Former call signs: DWXB-FM
- Former frequencies: 102.7 MHz (1978–1987)

Links
- Website: WXB102 on Mixlr

WXB 102 is a former Metro Manila FM radio station and current Internet radio station that plays new wave, punk rock, gothic rock, synthpop, electronic music, dance-punk, post-punk, classic alternative rock and more from the UK, US, Philippines and the rest of the world.

== History ==
Broadcasting at 102.7 MHz (initially at 102.5 MHz) on the FM dial, DWXB-FM, also referred to as WXB 102, was the first all-new wave music radio station in the Philippines. It was owned by Universal Broadcasting Corporation from 1982 to 1987. Tagged as "The Station That Dares to Be Different", WXB 102 targeted the youth demographic, bringing new wave music to the Philippine mainstream and inspiring regional rock artists such as the Dawn, Identity Crisis and Violent Playground, all of whom were championed by the station at a time when guitar-based OPM was ignored by the other local outlets with the exception of a weekly show on DZRJ-AM in the early 1980s.

Prior to switching to new wave, DWXB-FM was originally owned by the National Council of Churches in the Philippines with studios located at the Philippine Christian University in Taft Avenue, Manila. The management flirted with disco on its inception in 1978 and they were known at that time as DWXB Magic Disco 102. In 1982, they were acquired by Universal Broadcasting Corporation with their studios being moved to Donada St. in Pasay near the Rizal Memorial Coliseum and in that same year they adopted the American Top 40 format with the station being dubbed as Cute 102. By 1983, they started including new wave acts from the UK into the top 40 mix, due to the influence of the late DJ Mark Fournier and his uncle Eric Manuel eventually they would rebrand their station once again to WXB 102. In 1984, new wave began erupting in Manila's dance clubs thanks to the city's mobile discos, who often spun records imported from Europe, and the proliferation of new wave music videos on Philippine TV. WXB 102 gradually evolved into a new wave radio station with the Fournier, The Unbeatable, and Rico Severino, known as J.J. Michaels. WXB 102 briefly competed with another new wave and disco radio station in Manila, DZBM-FM 105.1 MHz (now DWBM-FM 105.1) which then dubbed as Power 105 BM FM in 1985 (now 105.1 Brigada News FM Manila).

It was only in 1986 when the station went full-blown "new music" in format with the line-up of The Morning Man or Inggo & his Request Round-Up at sign-on; Cool Carla; Julius Caesar; George Frederick, who was also the Program Director; Fat Albert & his program Rock Wave; and The Ghost. Later, Allan K (not the well-known comedian and television host) joined the staff deejays after an on-air search. A pair of blocktime shows that caught the youth market by the neck back then were Radio Manila and Capital Radio, specializing in local underground punk scene and UK and U.S. imports that characterized a harsher or more avant-garde side to alternative music. At this point, "The Station That Dares to Be Different" became the station's official slogan.

Despite the fact that this FM station was powered at a measly 1 kilowatt, WXB 102 developed a huge following in places where its signal could be picked up.

In 1986, WXB 102 was the Philippines' most influential music station, its popularity putting pressure on regional labels to belatedly release the entire discographies of several new wave artists. On the surface, their new wave format could be compared to overseas stations like KROQ-FM and CFNY-FM, but WXB 102 probed the genre for deeper cuts and more obscure acts, giving massive exposure to little-known or forgotten new wave artists from the UK. WXB 102, with the new wave market to itself and surprising Top 10 ratings, concentrated on pleasing its followers instead of playing to the masses.

By 1987, while the new wave era was sadly and mistakenly pronounced dead in America, the genre hadn't even reached its peak in Manila. Albums once unavailable were continuing to be licensed to Philippine labels, a lot of it being credited to WXB 102. However, 1987 would be WXB 102's final year. The new President Corazon Aquino administration through the newly-formed Presidential Commission on Good Government (PCGG) began sequestering properties owned by her predecessor Ferdinand Marcos and his cronies, including the home studio that WXB FM beamed from.

On June 9, 1987, despite attempts to keep it on the air, WXB 102 finally pulled the plug in Manila.

== Legacy ==
In November 1987, seeing that the absence of WXB 102 left a void on Manila radio that could be capitalized upon, NU 107 debuted at 107.5 MHz with a series of test broadcasts that resurrected the old WXB 102 format in what was termed a "New Rock" format. It essentially picked up where WXB 102 left off, debuting several late 1980s new wave acts such as When in Rome, Johnny Hates Jazz, Red Flag, Camouflage, C.C.C.P., the Sisters of Mercy and Information Society.

In 1988, Mickey the Clown from WXB 102 reappeared on DWBC-AM as Mick Flame and hosted a 102-styled show often featuring former WXB 102 DJs as guests.

In late 1987, 102.7 WSM The Gentle Wind (now 102.7 Star FM) under the call sign DWSM was acquired and launched by People's Broadcasting Services, with a dramatically increased 25 kilowatt signal; the station started carrying an easy listening format until 1994 when it was reformatted to 102.7 Star FM with a format targeting the masses.

== Internet radio ==
In 1998, the "A Tribute to XB102" site was envisioned by a fan and web designer from San Francisco. The goal back then was to introduce 102 music in cyberspace while tinkering with web and graphic design and to experiment with streaming broadcast of pre-recorded materials. A collaboration was then formed with Michael Sutton in 1999, hence the beginning of an exciting project that led to more materials to recreate the magic of the station. Two of the original DJs, Mark Fournier (known as Magic) and Dave Ryan "The Unbeatable" was going to join in the project but Magic died during his trip in San Francisco. In 2002, Neographix, the company hosting the tribute site was to shut down, which led to the end of this short-lived dream but creative tribute site.

On September 10, 2005, lifelong fan and new wave historian Michael Sutton, CEO of the independent label Sutton Records, revived WXB 102 in cyberspace, fulfilling a decade-old fantasy that had its online roots in the no-budget taped broadcasts. With Seattle-based DJ Brent Sanders as engineer and Los Angeles–based Filipino DJ Klyde using his WXB102 Forever website as the station's HQ, Sutton brought WXB 102 back on air. Sutton proceeded to recruit some of WXB's original staff, including Mick Flame, The Morning Man, and Cool Carla, to record their first WXB shows in 18 years.

Listeners could now hear WXB 102 through webstreaming powered by Live365. In 2006, WXB 102 started playing the most recent songs from new wave legends, and current indie and alternative acts such as Bloc Party, Franz Ferdinand, Kaiser Chiefs and the Killers, as well as reggae and ska.

On October 23, 2006, WXB 102 became the first online music station to have a countdown hosted by DJs in various countries.

On January 15, 2007, WXB 102 began broadcasting live for the first time since going off the air nearly 20 years before. WXB 102's legendary program director/DJ (and former NU107's "Ballad of the Times" co-host) George Frederick returned to the airwaves along with The Ghost, Mick Flame and Naughty Natty, one of the station's original volunteers. Two days later, Julius Caesar came back to the station, also broadcasting live from Manila. WXB 102 is the only Internet-based new wave radio station with live DJs broadcasting daily.

On July 26, 2007, WXB 102 became the highest rating Internet radio station in the dance-punk category on Live365.

On April 23, 2010, after almost five years with Live365, WXB transferred its live broadcast to USTREAM. Today, the station is currently broadcasting via Mixlr.
