= DXMC =

Bombo Radyo Koronadal (DXMC)
- Koronadal; Philippines
- Broadcast area: South Cotabato and surrounding areas
- Frequency: 1026 kHz
- Branding: DXMC Bombo Radyo

Programming
- Languages: Hiligaynon, Filipino
- Format: News, Public Affairs, Talk, Drama
- Network: Bombo Radyo

Ownership
- Owner: Bombo Radyo Philippines; (People's Broadcasting Service, Inc.)

History
- First air date: November 11, 1995
- Call sign meaning: Marbel City

Technical information
- Licensing authority: NTC
- Power: 5,000 watts

Links
- Webcast: Listen Live
- Website: Bombo Radyo Koronadal

DXMC (1026 AM) Bombo Radyo is a radio station owned and operated by Bombo Radyo Philippines through its licensee People's Broadcasting Service. Its studio and transmitter are located at Bombo Radyo Broadcast Center, JM Robredo Avenue, Purok Felipe, Brgy. San Isidro, Koronadal.

== Incidents ==
On May 5, 2000, at around 2:45 a.m., a grenade explosion occurred near the main door at the station's compound, which was then located at Barangay Sto. Niño, damaging a glass window and a parked vehicle. The Moro Islamic Liberation Front, accused by the police being the perpetrators of the attack, denied the claim.
