= DYFM-AM =

Radio station in Iloilo City, Philippines

Bombo Radyo Iloilo (DYFM)
- Iloilo City; Philippines
- Broadcast area: Iloilo, Guimaras and surrounding areas
- Frequency: 837 kHz
- Branding: DYFM Bombo Radyo

Programming
- Languages: Hiligaynon, Filipino
- Format: News, Public Affairs, Talk, Drama
- Network: Bombo Radyo

Ownership
- Owner: Bombo Radyo Philippines; (People's Broadcasting Service, Inc.)
- Sister stations: 99.5 Star FM

History
- First air date: July 6, 1966
- Former frequencies: 850 kHz (1966–1978)
- Call sign meaning: Inverted as Marcelino Florete (founder)

Technical information
- Licensing authority: NTC
- Power: 10,000 watts
- Transmitter coordinates: 10°42′19″N 122°35′15″E

Links
- Webcast: Live Stream
- Website: Bombo Radyo Iloilo

DYFM (837 AM) Bombo Radyo is a radio station owned and operated by Bombo Radyo Philippines through its licensee People's Broadcasting Service. It serves as the flagship station of the Bombo Radyo Network. Its studio and offices are located at Bombo Radyo Broadcast Center, 6th, 7th & 8th Floors Sky City Tower, Mapa St., Iloilo City, while its transmitter is located at Brgy. Lobuc, Lapuz, Iloilo City.
