= DYWB =

Radio station in Bacolod, Philippines

Bombo Radyo Bacolod (DYWB)
- Bacolod; Philippines
- Broadcast area: Northern Negros Occidental and surrounding areas
- Frequency: 630 kHz
- Branding: DYWB Bombo Radyo

Programming
- Languages: Hiligaynon, Filipino
- Format: News, Public Affairs, Talk, Drama
- Network: Bombo Radyo

Ownership
- Owner: Bombo Radyo Philippines; (People's Broadcasting Service, Inc.)
- Sister stations: 95.9 Star FM

History
- First air date: 1968
- Former frequencies: 1250 kHz (1968–1978); 1269 kHz (1978–2012)

Technical information
- Licensing authority: NTC
- Power: 10,000 watts

Links
- Webcast: Listen Live
- Website: Bombo Radyo Bacolod

DYWB (630 AM) Bombo Radyo is a radio station owned and operated by Bombo Radyo Philippines through its licensee People's Broadcasting Service. Its studio and transmitter are located at Bombo Radyo Broadcast Center, Lacson St., Brgy. Mandalagan, Bacolod. During the station's off-air hours, the spill-over signals of Manila-based DZMM and Vietnam-based Voice of Vietnam can be heard on this frequency.
