= CIÉ 801 Class =

CIÉ K801 class
Type and origin
- Power type: Diesel-hydraulic
- Builder: Maschinenbau Kiel, Germany
- Serial number: 800028
- Model: 800 D
- Build date: 1954
Specifications
- Configuration
  - Whyte: 0-8-0DH
  - UIC: D
- Gauge: 1,600 mm (5 ft 3 in)
- Minimum curve: 50 m (164.04 ft)
- Length: 11.3 m (37 ft 1 in)
- Loco weight: 57.6 t (56.7 long tons; 63.5 short tons)
- Prime mover: MaK MA 301 A
- RPM range: 750 rpm max.
- Engine type: Diesel
- Transmission: Voith L 37 zUb hydraulic
Performance figures
- Maximum speed: 80 km/h (50 mph)
- Power output: 800 PS (590 kW) at 750 rpm
- Tractive effort: 112 kN (25,000 lbf) at starting, 26 kN (5,800 lbf) at 60 km/h (37 mph), 18 kN (4,000 lbf) at 80 km/h (50 mph)
Career
- Operators: GNRB (1954–1958); CIÉ (1958–1976); Galway Metal Co., stationary power source, (1976–1995)
- Number in class: 1
- Numbers: GNRB: 800; CIÉ: K801
- First run: December 1954
- Withdrawn: 1976–1995
- Disposition: Scrapped in 1999

The "Type K", number 801 was a diesel locomotive which was allocated to Córas Iompair Éireann (CIÉ) following the disbanding of the Great Northern Railway Board (GNRB) in 1958.

== History ==
The single locomotive of this class was acquired by the GNRB in December 1954 and became their number 800.

It was built by German builders Maschinenbau Kiel (MaK), who built over one hundred of these Type 800 D locomotives between 1953 and 1965. It was delivered free of charge for trials and unloaded at North Wall, Dublin on 14 December 1954. The locomotive closely followed German practice being fitted with an 800 hp (600 kW) MaK diesel engine, feeding power to the rails through a Voith torque converter. The locomotive shared many similarities with the less powerful Deutsche Bundesbahn class V65, it had a "D" (8-coupled) wheel arrangement and was controlled from an off-centre cab.

The locomotive underwent trials on both goods and passenger trains over various parts of the GNRB system and on some of the Ulster Transport Authority's former Northern Counties Committee lines. Following the trials, it was purchased by the GNRB for the sum of £29,500.

Following the dissolution of the Board in 1958 it was allocated to CIÉ and renumbered K801. Trials between Dublin and Kildare and on Dublin–Bray passenger trains followed before K801 was transferred to Cork, where it worked mainly on the Cobh and Youghal lines. K801 was stopped on 7 September 1967, but reinstated over seven years later on a date variously reported as 30 September or 1 October 1974. After reinstatement, K801 worked in the Drogheda area but was stopped again shortly thereafter, on 1 November. It was withdrawn in 1976 and acquired by the Galway Metal Company as a static power source, being partially scrapped around 1995. The remains of this unique loco were cut up in February 1999.

== Livery details ==
- GNRB: Dark blue with a cream stripe and red wheels
- CIÉ: Green with an eau de nil stripe, and later black with a white stripe.

== Model ==
The K Class model is based on the DB (Deutsche Bahn) V65. This is available from ROCO in HO scale. Steve Johnson’s site has more detail,.
