= DWIM-FM =

Radio station in Baguio, Philippines

Star FM Baguio (DWIM)
- Baguio; Philippines
- Broadcast area: Benguet, La Union and surrounding areas
- Frequency: 89.5 MHz
- Branding: 89.5 Star FM

Programming
- Languages: English, Ilocano, Filipino
- Format: Contemporary MOR, OPM, News
- Network: Star FM

Ownership
- Owner: Bombo Radyo Philippines; (People's Broadcasting Service, Inc.)
- Sister stations: DZWX Bombo Radyo

History
- First air date: August 21, 1991
- Former names: WIM (August 21, 1991-April 21, 1994)
- Call sign meaning: Imelda and Marcelino Florete

Technical information
- Licensing authority: NTC
- Power: 5,000 watts
- ERP: 20,000 watts

Links
- Webcast: Listen Live
- Website: Star FM Baguio

DWIM (89.5 FM), broadcasting as 89.5 Star FM, is a radio station owned and operated by Bombo Radyo Philippines through its licensee People's Broadcasting Service, Inc. Its studios and transmitter are located at Bombo Radyo Broadcast Center, 87 Lourdes Subdivision Rd., Baguio.

== History ==
The station was established on August 21, 1991, as 89.5 WIM. It aired a Top 40 format with the slogan "The Rhythm of the City". In less than a year, WIM was ranked by the Radio Research Council as the most listened station in the city.

On April 22, 1994, to provide a more solid identity for all of Bombo Radyo's FM stations, WIM was re-launched as 89.5 Star FM and switched to a mass-based format. On February 3, 2014, Bombo Network News began simulcasting in several Star FM stations. In the 1st quarter of 2016, to emphasize more on the music, Star FM started carrying the slogan "It's All For You".
