= DXES =

Radio station in General Santos, Philippines

Bombo Radyo General Santos (DXES)

General Santos; Philippines
- Broadcast area: Soccsksargen and surrounding areas
- Frequency: 801 kHz
- Branding: DXES Bombo Radyo

Programming
- Languages: Cebuano, Filipino
- Format: News, Public Affairs, Talk, Drama
- Network: Bombo Radyo

Ownership
- Owner: Bombo Radyo Philippines; (People's Broadcasting Service, Inc.)

History
- First air date: 1968
- Former frequencies: 790 kHz (1968–1978)
- Call sign meaning: Elena and Salome Florete

Technical information
- Licensing authority: NTC
- Power: 5,000 watts
- Transmitter coordinates: 6°6′20.4″N 125°12′2.2″E

Links
- Webcast: Listen Live
- Website: Bombo Radyo General Santos

DXES (801 AM) Bombo Radyo is a radio station owned and operated by Bombo Radyo Philippines through its licensee People's Broadcasting Service. Its studio and transmitter are located at Bombo Radyo Broadcast Center, Amao Rd., Brgy. Bula, General Santos.
