= DZNG =

Radio station in Naga, Camarines Sur, Philippines

Bombo Radyo Naga (DZNG)

Naga; Philippines
- Broadcast area: Camarines Sur and surrounding areas
- Frequency: 1044 kHz
- Branding: DZNG Bombo Radyo

Programming
- Languages: Bicolano, Filipino
- Format: News, Public Affairs, Talk, Drama
- Network: Bombo Radyo

Ownership
- Owner: Bombo Radyo Philippines; (Newsounds Broadcasting Network, Inc.)

History
- First air date: 1984
- Former call signs: DZDR
- Call sign meaning: Naga

Technical information
- Licensing authority: NTC
- Power: 10,000 watts
- Transmitter coordinates: 13°37′02″N 123°11′08″E

Links
- Webcast: Listen Live
- Website: Bombo Radyo Naga

DZNG (1044 AM) Bombo Radyo is a radio station owned and operated by Bombo Radyo Philippines through its licensee Newsounds Broadcasting Network. Its studio and transmitter are located at Bombo Radyo Broadcast Center, Diversion Rd. cor. Tabuco Dr., Naga, Camarines Sur.
