= DZNC =

Radio station in Isabela, Philippines

Bombo Radyo Cauayan (DZNC)
- Cauayan; Philippines
- Broadcast area: Central Cagayan Valley and surrounding areas
- Frequency: 801 kHz
- Branding: DZNC Bombo Radyo

Programming
- Languages: Ilocano, Filipino
- Format: News, Public Affairs, Talk, Drama
- Network: Bombo Radyo

Ownership
- Owner: Bombo Radyo Philippines; (Newsounds Broadcasting Network, Inc.)

History
- First air date: August 14, 1968
- Former frequencies: 800 kHz (1968–1978)

Technical information
- Licensing authority: NTC
- Power: 10,000 watts
- Transmitter coordinates: 16°53′59″N 121°45′37″E

Links
- Webcast: Listen Live
- Website: Bombo Radyo Cauayan

DZNC (801 AM) Bombo Radyo is a radio station owned and operated by Bombo Radyo Philippines through its licensee Newsounds Broadcasting Network. Its studio and transmitter are located at the Bombo Radyo Broadcast Center, National Highway, Brgy. Minante II, Cauayan, Isabela.
