= DYRF-FM =

Radio station in Iloilo City, Philippines

Star FM Iloilo (DYRF)
- Iloilo City; Philippines
- Broadcast area: Iloilo, Guimaras and surrounding areas
- Frequency: 99.5 MHz
- Branding: 99.5 Star FM

Programming
- Languages: English, Hiligaynon, Filipino
- Format: Contemporary MOR, OPM, News
- Network: Star FM

Ownership
- Owner: Bombo Radyo Philippines; (People's Broadcasting Service, Inc.)
- Sister stations: DYFM Bombo Radyo

History
- First air date: 1976
- Former names: 99.5 RF (1976-April 21, 1994)
- Call sign meaning: Rogelio Florete

Technical information
- Licensing authority: NTC
- Power: 10,000 watts
- ERP: 16,000 watts

Links
- Webcast: Listen Live
- Website: Star FM Iloilo

DYRF (99.5 FM), broadcasting as 99.5 Star FM, is a radio station owned and operated by Bombo Radyo Philippines through its licensee People's Broadcasting Service, Inc. It serves as the flagship station of the Star FM Network. Its studio, offices and transmitter are located at the 3rd Floor, R. Florete Bldg., Rizal St. cor. Iznart St., Iloilo City.

== History ==
DYRF was Bombo Radyo's first FM station, established in 1976 as 99.5 RF. In 1987, it began carrying a Top 40 format with the slogan "The Rhythm of the City". It was one of the most listened to station during those era.

In 1993, it switched to a soft adult contemporary format with the slogan "The Gentle Wind". On April 22, 1994, to provide a more solid identity for all of Bombo Radyo's FM stations, the station was re-launched as 99.5 Star FM and switched to a mass-based format. On February 3, 2014, Bombo Network News began simulcasting in several Star FM stations. In the 1st quarter of 2016, to emphasize more on the music, Star FM started carrying the slogan "It's All For You".
