= 801 Helwerthia =

Main belt Asteroid

Discovery
- Discovered by: Max Wolf
- Discovery site: Heidelberg Observatory
- Discovery date: 20 March 1915

Designations
- Alternative designations: 1915 WQ; A924 OD; 1925 RG; 1970 GS1

Orbital characteristics
- Epoch 31 July 2016 (JD 2457600.5)
- Uncertainty parameter 0
- Observation arc: 101.08 yr (36918 d)
- Aphelion: 2.8087 AU (420.18 Gm)
- Perihelion: 2.4007 AU (359.14 Gm)
- Semi-major axis: 2.6047 AU (389.66 Gm)
- Eccentricity: 0.078337
- Orbital period (sidereal): 4.20 yr (1535.4 d)
- Mean anomaly: 47.6362°
- Mean motion: 0° 14^{m} 4.056^{s} / day
- Inclination: 14.130°
- Longitude of ascending node: 185.973°
- Argument of perihelion: 335.076°
- Earth MOID: 1.41172 AU (211.190 Gm)
- Jupiter MOID: 2.17333 AU (325.126 Gm)
- T_{Jupiter}: 3.366

Physical characteristics
- Mean radius: 16.615±1.25 km
- Synodic rotation period: 23.93 h (0.997 d)
- Geometric albedo: 0.0384±0.007
- Absolute magnitude (H): 11.55

801 Helwerthia is a C-type asteroid orbiting in the Main belt near the Eunomia family. However, it is not a family member but an un-related interloper in the region because its composition is inconsistent with membership. Its diameter is about 33 km, its albedo around 0.038. An international team of astronomers observed this minor planet photometrically in 2012, determining a rotation period of 23.93±0.01 h with an amplitude of 0.15±0.03 in magnitude.
