= Bombo Radyo Philippines =

Philippine radio network

- Type: Private
- Industry: Radio Network
- Founded: Iloilo City, Philippines (July 6, 1966)
- Founder: Don Marcelino Florete Sr.
- Headquarters: Florete Bldg., 2406 Nobel Corner Edison Streets, Barangay San Isidro, Makati, Metro Manila, Philippines
- Key people: Dr Rogelio M. Florete (Chairman); Margaret Ruth C. Florete (President and CEO)
- Revenue: ₱3.525 billion (FY 2016)
- Net income: ₱3.525 billion (FY 2016)
- Owner: Bombo Radyo Holdings, Inc.
- Parent: Florete Group of Companies
- Subsidiaries: Newsounds Broadcasting Network, Inc. (NBN); People's Broadcasting Service, Inc. (PBS)
- Website: Bombo Radyo

Bombo Radyo Holdings, Inc. (d/b/a Bombo Radyo Philippines) is a Philippine radio network of the Florete Group of Companies, which also manages banking and pawnshop operations. Its main office and headquarters are located in Barangay San Isidro, Makati. It operates several stations across the country under the Bombo Radyo and Star FM brands. Currently, most of its stations are licensed to People's Broadcasting Service, Inc. (PBS), while a handful of its AM stations are licensed to Newsounds Broadcasting Network, Inc. (NBN). Consolidated Broadcasting System, Inc. (CBS) formerly served as licensee for some of its FM stations from 1992 until 2018, when PBS took over as their licensee, following the former's non-renewal.

Named after the Spanish language name for a drum, the bass drum and its beats serve as the network's sonic identity, commonly used between breaks during newscasts.

== History ==
Its flagship station, Bombo Radyo Iloilo, based in Iloilo City, was founded on July 6, 1966. Since the beginning of operations, the station's studios were located inside the Florete Building on Mapa Street in Iloilo City Proper, until they were relocated to the Bombo Radyo Broadcast Center alongside Luna Street in La Paz District. The station has been the top radio station since its inception during the 1970s.

DYFM was then part of the Northern Broadcasting Corporation. Don Marcelino, the grand old man of Bombo Radyo, accepted a joint venture agreement with former Ilocos Sur Governor, Antonio D. Villanueva, enabling the station to begin its broadcasts.

From humble beginnings and starting with a small number of employees, the Florete Group then acquired the operations of NBC with ten stations and two affiliates in the whole archipelago. It also entered a management alliance together with Consolidated Broadcasting Systems, Newsounds Broadcasting Network and People's Broadcasting Service. From 1967 to 1975, Bombo Radyo Philippines established every station in Laoag, Vigan, Cauayan, Bacolod, General Santos, Palawan, Baguio, Daet and Davao.

In 1976, Dr. Rogelio Florete, through the advice of his mother Doña Salome Florete, had started to helm the day-to-day operations of Bombo Radyo. In the same year, the network launched its first FM station DYRF. From then on, the network continued to expand to several markets, including the acquisition of DWXB from Universal Broadcasting Network in 1987, which would later on carry the call letters DWSM.

== Radio stations ==
The following is a list of radio stations owned and affiliated by Bombo Radyo Philippines.

=== Bombo Radyo ===
Bombo Radyo
- Type: Broadcast AM radio network, (News, Public Affairs, Talk, Drama)
- Country: Philippines
- Availability: Regional
- Founded: July 6, 1966
- Motto: Basta Radyo... BOMBO! (As long as there is radio... there is BOMBO!)

Despite not having an AM station in Manila (though maintaining a newsroom and headquarters in Makati), Bombo Radyo Philippines' AM division consistently earns strong ratings particularly in the Visayas and Mindanao regions.

Branding	Callsign	Frequency	Power	Location
Bombo Radyo Iloilo	DYFM	837 kHz	10 kW	Iloilo City
Bombo Radyo Tuguegarao	DZGR	891 kHz	10 kW	Tuguegarao
Bombo Radyo Laoag (Note: Licensed to Newsounds Broadcasting Network.)	DZVR	711 kHz	5 kW	Laoag
Bombo Radyo Vigan	DZVV	603 kHz	5 kW	Vigan
Bombo Radyo Cauayan	DZNC	801 kHz	10 kW	Cauayan
Bombo Radyo La Union	DZSO	720 kHz	5 kW	San Fernando
Bombo Radyo Baguio	DZWX	1035 kHz	5 kW	Baguio
Bombo Radyo Dagupan	DZWN	1125 kHz	10 kW	Dagupan
Bombo Radyo Naga	DZNG	1044 kHz	10 kW	Naga
Bombo Radyo Legazpi	DZLG	927 kHz	5 kW	Legazpi
Bombo Radyo Bacolod	DYWB	630 kHz	10 kW	Bacolod
Bombo Radyo Cebu	DYMF	963 kHz	10 kW	Cebu City
Bombo Radyo Roxas	DYOW	900 kHz	5 kW	Roxas
Bombo Radyo Kalibo	DYIN	1107 kHz	5 kW	Kalibo
Bombo Radyo Tacloban	DYTX	95.1 MHz	10 kW	Tacloban
Bombo Radyo Davao	DXMF	576 kHz	10 kW	Davao City
Bombo Radyo Butuan	DXBR	981 kHz	10 kW	Butuan
Bombo Radyo Cagayan de Oro	DXIF	729 kHz	10 kW	Cagayan de Oro
Bombo Radyo Malaybalay	DXCB	864 kHz	5 kW	Malaybalay
Bombo Radyo General Santos	DXES	801 kHz	5 kW	General Santos
Bombo Radyo Koronadal	DXMC	1026 kHz	5 kW	Koronadal

=== Star FM ===
Star FM
- Type: Broadcast FM radio network
- Country: Philippines

Ownership
- Owner: Bombo Radyo Philippines
- Parent: Bombo Radyo Holdings, Inc.

History
- Founded: April 22, 1994

Coverage
- Availability: National

Links
- Website: www.bomboradyo.com/starfm

Star FM is Bombo Radyo's FM network. The network's strongest market segment is composed of provincial or rural residents currently residing in Manila, aided by its strong brand recognition in the provinces. Until April 22, 1994, Bombo Radyo managed its FM stations locally, each with its own unique brand name.

Unfortunately, due to financial losses caused by a decline in the network's income during 2004, the number of FM stations was reduced from 22 to 11. 95.1 Star FM Tacloban was rebranded as Bombo Radyo Tacloban and now shares the same vision and objectives. The rebranding proved successful, as Star FM now enjoys strong ratings nationwide. Star FM stations are sometimes used for news gathering, especially during local and national elections, coverage of important Senate and House hearings, severe weather events (such as typhoons), disasters, breaking news, or other important news events when warranted.

All Star FM stations have been licensed to People's Broadcasting Service since 2018.

Branding	Callsign	Frequency	Power	Location
Star FM Manila	DWSM	102.7 MHz	25 kW	Metro Manila
Star FM Baguio	DWIM	89.5 MHz	5 kW	Baguio
Star FM Dagupan	DWHY	100.7 MHz	10 kW	Dagupan
Star FM Iloilo	DYRF	99.5 MHz	10 kW	Iloilo City
Star FM Roxas	DYRX	103.7 MHz	5 kW	Roxas
Star FM Bacolod	DYIF	95.9 MHz	10 kW	Bacolod
Star FM Cebu	DYMX	95.5 MHz	25 kW	Cebu City
Star FM Zamboanga	DXCB	93.9 MHz	10 kW	Zamboanga City
Star FM Dipolog	DXFB	93.3 MHz	5 kW	Dipolog
Star FM Davao	DXFX	96.3 MHz	10 kW	Davao City
Star FM Cotabato	DXFD	93.7 MHz	5 kW	Cotabato City
