= 93.5 FM =

FM radio frequency

The following radio stations broadcast on FM frequency 93.5 MHz:

== Argentina ==
- Antena 5 in Progreso, Santa Fe
- LRI367 in Colonia Josefina, Santa Fe
- LRM946 in San Vicente, Santa Fe
- Radio Del Plata (Rosario) in Rosario, Santa Fe
- Radio María in Caseros, Buenos Aires
- Radio María in Monte Caseros, Corrientes

== Australia ==
- TLCFM Lower Clarence Community Radio in Yamba, New South Wales
- 2DBO in Dubbo, New South Wales
- 3BBO in Bendigo, Victoria
- 3RPH Warragul in Latrobe Valley, Victoria
- 4ROK in Gladstone, Queensland
- 2SNO in Goulburn, New South Wales

== Canada (Channel 228) ==
- CBCL-FM in London, Ontario
- CBGA-8-FM in Iles-de-la-Madeleine, Quebec
- CBKF-FM-3 in Zenon Park, Saskatchewan
- CBM-FM in Montreal, Quebec
- CBUZ-FM in Chetwynd, British Columbia
- CFXJ-FM in Toronto, Ontario
- CFZN-FM in Haliburton, Ontario
- CHLA-FM in Whitehorse, Yukon
- CHMR-FM in St. John's, Newfoundland and Labrador
- CHYL-FM in York Landing, Manitoba
- CIEL-FM-5 in Sully, Quebec
- CIGM-FM in Sudbury, Ontario
- CIHS-FM in Wetaskiwin, Alberta
- CIKX-FM in Grand Falls, New Brunswick
- CIST-FM in St. Theresa Point, Manitoba
- CIWR-FM in Waterhen, Manitoba
- CJAS-FM in St-Augustin, Quebec
- CJDR-FM-1 in Sparwood, British Columbia
- CJEL-FM in Winkler/Morden, Manitoba
- CJLS-FM-1 in New Tusket, Nova Scotia
- CJLY-FM in Nelson, British Columbia
- CJKS-FM in Oshweken, Ontario
- CKBM-FM in Brochet, Manitoba
- CKPR-FM-2 in Atikokan, Ontario
- CKSB-7-FM in Kenora, Ontario
- CKUM-FM in Moncton, New Brunswick
- CKVH-FM in High Prairie, Alberta
- CKXC-FM in Kingston, Ontario
- CKXO-FM in Chibougamau, Quebec
- CKZX-FM in New Denver, British Columbia
- VF2174 in God's Lake Narrows, Alberta
- VF2195 in Cross Lake, Manitoba
- VF2203 in Kemano, British Columbia
- VF2316 in Avola, British Columbia
- VF2334 in Fox Lake First Nation, Manitoba
- VF2335 in Lake Manitoba, Manitoba
- VF2336 in Griswold, Manitoba
- VF2337 in Easterville, Manitoba
- VF2340 in Hollow Water, Manitoba
- VF2342 in Sherridon, Manitoba
- VF2402 in Kattiniq, Quebec
- VF2404 in Jackhead, Manitoba
- VF2405 in Pauingassi, Manitoba
- VF2406 in Leaf Rapids, Manitoba
- VF2411 in Loon Lake, Saskatchewan
- VF2421 in Dauphin River, Manitoba

== China ==
- CNR The Voice of China in Chenzhou, Fuzhou, Hefei and Luzhou
- CNR Business Radio in Shenyang and Yumen
- Maoming Traffic Radio

== India ==
- Red FM (India) in Delhi, Mumbai, Kolkata, Hyderabad
- Suryan FM 93.5 in Chennai and 44 other cities

== Japan ==
- JOIR-FM in Sendai, Miyagi
- NBC RADIO SAGA in Saga

== Mexico ==
- XHBAL-FM in San Cristóbal de las Casas, Chiapas
- XHCAT-FM in Catemaco, Veracruz
- XHEJ-FM in Puerto Vallarta, Jalisco
- XHEVAB-FM in Valle de Bravo, Estado de México
- XHLAZ-FM in Tamaliagua, Jalisco
- XHLU-FM in Ciudad Serdán, Puebla
- XHNY-FM in Irapuato, Guanajuato
- XHO-FM in Matamoros, Tamaulipas
- XHPP-FM in Pánuco, Veracruz
- XHPPO-FM in Puerto Peñasco, Sonora
- XHPTLM-FM in Tulúm, Quintana Roo
- XHQC-FM in Saltillo, Coahuila

== Netherlands ==
- Radio Barneveld in Barneveld

== Philippines ==
- DXQR in Cagayan de Oro
- DYEY in Boracay
- DYMK-FM in Iloilo City
- DWTL in Dagupan City
- DWTY in Olongapo City
- DYTY in Tacloban City
- DYCZ in Ormoc City
- DXCL in Tagum City
- DXER in General Santos
- Juander Radyo Ipil, Zamboanga Sibugay
- DXIM in Butuan City

== Taiwan ==
- Transfers CNR The Voice of China in parts of Hsinchu, Matsu, Taipei and Taoyuan

== Trinidad and Tobago ==
- Hott 93 in Trinidad

== United Kingdom ==
=== England ===
- BBC Radio 4 at Wrotham, Kent

=== Tristan da Cunha ===
- Atlantic FM

== United States (Channel 228) ==
- KADD in Logandale, Nevada
- KALQ-FM in Alamosa, Colorado
- KBFC in Forrest City, Arkansas
- KBKG in Corning, Arkansas
- KCVM in Hudson, Iowa
- KDAY in Redondo Beach, California
- KDEY-FM in Ontario, California
- KDGS in Andover, Kansas
- KDJF in Ester, Alaska
- KDVY in Crockett, Texas
- KFDP-LP in Bloomfield, New Mexico
- KGWT in George West, Texas
- KIKT in Cooper, Texas
- KIPI in Eagle Butte, South Dakota
- KITN (FM) in Worthington, Minnesota
- KJAE in Leesville, Louisiana
- KJAX in Jackson, Wyoming
- KJOC in Bettendorf, Iowa
- KKBN in Twain Harte, California
- KKDT in Burdett, Kansas
- KKMI in Burlington, Iowa
- KKOT in Columbus, Nebraska
- KLAN in Glasgow, Montana
- KLKC in Parsons, Kansas
- KLMR-FM in Lamar, Colorado
- KLXE in Calhoun, Louisiana
- KLXK in Breckenridge, Texas
- KMKX in Willits, California
- KNCE in Taos, New Mexico
- KOCA-LP in Laramie, Wyoming
- KOMT in Lakeview, Arkansas
- KORV in Lakeview, Oregon
- KOZI-FM in Chelan, Washington
- KPOA in Lahaina, Hawaii
- KPPM-LP in Lake Charles, Louisiana
- KPRO in Altus, Oklahoma
- KPWA in Bismarck, Arkansas
- KQAV in Rosamond, California
- KQNG in Lihue, Hawaii
- KREO in James Town, Wyoming
- KRMS-FM in Osage Beach, Missouri
- KRSS in Tarkio, Missouri
- KRTS in Marfa, Texas
- KSCR in Benson, Minnesota
- KSNX in Show Low, Arizona
- KSTQ in Stuart, Oklahoma
- KTND in Aspen, Colorado
- KTRI in Royal City, Washington
- KWCQ in Condon, Oregon
- KWDC-LP in Stockton, California
- KWES-FM in Ruidoso, New Mexico
- KWUS-LP in Clarksville, Tennessee
- KXCD in Fairfield, Idaho
- KYKK in Junction, Texas
- KZTL in Paxton, Nebraska
- KZWF-LP in Wichita Falls, Texas
- KZXT in Eureka, Montana
- WAIN in Columbia, Kentucky
- WARQ in Columbia, South Carolina
- WAWR in Remsen, New York
- WAXM in Big Stone Gap, Virginia
- WBBC in Blackstone, Virginia
- WBCM in Boyne City, Michigan
- WBGF in Belle Glade, Florida
- WBNV in Barnesville, Ohio
- WCCA-LP in Scottsville, Virginia
- WCTB in Fairfield, Maine
- WDOG in Allendale, South Carolina
- WDPJ-LP in Danville, Kentucky
- WEEY in Swanzey, New Hampshire
- WFBY in Buckhannon, West Virginia
- WFDZ in Perry, Florida
- WFRQ in Harwich Port, Massachusetts
- WGEE in New London, Wisconsin
- WGLN-LP in Cedar Lake, Michigan
- WGYJ-LP in Atmore, Alabama
- WHJT in Clinton, Mississippi
- WHMI in Howell, Michigan
- WITW-LP in Valparaiso, Indiana
- WJFT-LP in Sanford, North Carolina
- WJJS in Salem, Virginia
- WKBQ in Covington, Tennessee
- WKHY in Lafayette, Indiana
- WKIL-LP in Elkhart, Indiana
- WKLV-FM in Butler, Alabama
- WKMJ in Hancock, Michigan
- WKWX in Savannah, Tennessee
- WKZX-FM in Lenoir City, Tennessee
- WLGR in Warrensburg, New York
- WLKE in Gallitzin, Pennsylvania
- WLQB in Ocean Isle Beach, North Carolina
- WLYD in Chandler, Indiana
- WMDA-LP in Memphis, Tennessee
- WMMG in Brandenburg, Kentucky
- WMPK in Summit, Mississippi
- WMPZ in Harrison, Tennessee
- WMRG in Morgan, Georgia
- WMWV in Conway, New Hampshire
- WMXQ in Hartford City, Indiana
- WPHH in Hope Hull, Alabama
- WPSA-LP in Portage, Wisconsin
- WQRW in Wellsville, New York
- WRDJ-LP in Merritt Island, Florida
- WRHW-LP in Murfreesboro, Tennessee
- WRHZ-LP in Three Oaks, Michigan
- WRLY-LP in Raleigh, North Carolina
- WRPO-LP in Russells Point, Ohio
- WRQN in Bowling Green, Ohio
- WSBG in Stroudsburg, Pennsylvania
- WSBL-LP in South Bend, Indiana
- WSJK in Tuscola, Illinois
- WSPP-LP in Hopkinsville, Kentucky
- WSRM in Coosa, Georgia
- WTPA-FM in Mechanicsburg, Pennsylvania
- WTTZ-LP in Baltimore, Maryland
- WVBR in Ithaca, New York
- WVIP in New Rochelle, New York
- WVIV-FM in Lemont, Illinois
- WVOH in Hazlehurst, Georgia
- WVVI-FM in Christiansted, Virgin Islands
- WYAW-LP in Savannah, Georgia
- WYFQ in Wadesboro, North Carolina
- WZBH in Millsboro, Delaware
- WZCR in Hudson, New York
- WZFL in Islamorada, Florida
