= List of radio stations in Western Visayas =

Here is the list of radio stations in the Western Visayas region:

== Aklan ==
=== AM stations ===
Frequency	Name	Company	Format	Call Sign	Power	Location Covered
693 AM	DZRH Kalibo (relay from Manila)	MBC Media Group	drama, news, public affairs, talk	DYKH	1 KW	Kalibo
1107 AM	Bombo Radyo Kalibo	People's Broadcasting Service (Bombo Radyo Philippines)	Drama, News, Public Affairs, talk	DYIN	5 KW	Kalibo
1161 AM	RMN Kalibo	Radio Mindanao Network	Drama, News, Public Affairs, Talk	DYKR	5 KW	Kalibo

=== FM stations ===
Frequency	Name	Company	Format	Call Sign	Power	Location Covered
89.3 FM	Brigada News FM Kalibo	Baycomms Broadcasting Corporation (Brigada Mass Media Corporation)	Contemporary MOR, News, talk	DYKY	5 KW	Kalibo
92.9 FM	Barangay RU/Super Radyo Kalibo	GMA Network, Inc.	Contemporary MOR, News, Talk	DYRU	5 KW	Kalibo
94.5 FM	K5 News FM Kalibo	Tagbilaran Broadcasting System (operated by 5K Broadcasting Network)	Contemporary MOR, News, Talk	DYTJ	5 KW	Kalibo
96.5 FM	XFM Kalibo	Katigbak Enterprises (DCG Radio-TV Network), operated by Yes2Health Advertising, Inc.	contemporary MOR, news, talk	DYKB	5 KW	Kalibo
98.5 FM	Radyo Natin Kalibo	MBC Media Group, operated by the Municipal Government of Kalibo	Community radio	DYYM	5 KW	Kalibo
100.1 FM	Love Radio Kalibo	Kalibo Cable Television Network (MBC Media Group)	contemporary MOR, OPM	DYSM	5 KW	Kalibo
101.7 FM	Adventist World Radio Kalibo	Digital Broadcasting Corporation (Adventist Media)	Religious Radio (Seventh-day Adventist)	—N/a	5 kW	Kalibo
104.5 FM	Adventist World Radio Batan	Digital Broadcasting Corporation (Adventist Media)	Religious Radio (Seventh-day Adventist)	—N/a	5 kW	Batan
107.7 FM	Energy FM Kalibo	Ultrasonic Broadcasting System (operated by Media Z Network Management and Marketing)	contemporary MOR, News, Talk	DYUB	1 KW	Kalibo

== Antique ==
=== AM stations ===
Frequency	Name	Company		Call Sign	Power	Location Covered
801 AM	DYKA 801	Catholic Bishops Conference of the Philippines (Catholic Media Network)	Catholic radio, information, music, news	DYKA-AM	5 KW	San Jose

=== FM stations ===
Frequency	Name	Company	Format	Call Sign	Power	Location Covered
88.5 FM	Radyo Kaabyanan	National Nutrition Council (Nutriskwela Community Radio), operated by the Municipal Government of Sibalom	community radio	DYNB	0.5 KW	Sibalom
88.7 FM	Radyo Kaimaw	National Nutrition Council (Nutriskwela Community Radio), operated by the Municipal Government of Pandan	community radio	DYNC	0.5 KW	Pandan
90.1 FM	Voice FM Antique	Tagbilaran Broadcasting System	Information, Music, News		2 KW	San Jose
91.7 FM	Radyo Natin San Jose	Radyo Natin Network (MBC Media Group)	Information, News, Pop, Variety hits	DYRS	1 KW	San Jose
93.3 FM	XFM Antique	Y2H Broadcasting Network	Contemporary MOR, News, Talk	—N/a	5 kW	San Jose
94.1 FM	Spirit FM Antique	Catholic Bishops Conference of the Philippines (Catholic Media Network)	Catholic radio, Information, Music, News	DYKA-FM	5 KW	San Jose
95.7 FM	K5 News FM Antique	Rizal Memorial Colleges Broadcasting Corporation and 5K Broadcasting Network	Music, News, Information	DYBZ	1 KW	San Jose
101.1 FM	Radyo Natin Culasi	Radyo Natin Network (MBC Media Group)	Information, News, Pop, Variety hits	DYRE	1 KW	Culasi
101.3 FM	Adventist World Radio Sibalom	Digital Broadcasting Corporation (Adventist Media)	Religious Radio (Seventh-day Adventist)	—N/a	5 kW	Sibalom
102.1 FM	Real Boss Radio	PEC Broadcasting Corporation	Information, News, Pop, Variety hits	DYNP	2 KW	San Jose
102.9 FM	Radyo Natin Bugasong	Radyo Natin Network (MBC Media Group)	Information, News, Pop, Variety hits	DYBG	1 KW	Bugasong
103.1 FM	Adventist World Radio San Jose	Digital Broadcasting Corporation (Adventist Media)	Religious Radio (Seventh-day Adventist)	—N/a	5 kW	San Jose
104.5 FM	Brigada News FM Antique	Brigada Mass Media Corporation	Contemporary MOR, News, Talk	DYYC	5 kW	San Jose
106.9 FM	Radyo Natin Hamtic	Radyo Natin Network (MBC Media Group)	Information, News, Pop, Variety hits	DYJJ	1 KW	Hamtic
103.3 FM	Radyo Caluya	Radyo Caluya Broadcasting Network (operated by Municipal Government of Caluya)	Music, Information, Entertainment, News	—N/a	1 KW	Caluya

== Boracay ==
=== FM stations ===
Frequency	Name	Company	Format	Call Sign	Power	Location Covered
88.5 FM	Radyo Todo Aklan	Todo Media (Presidential Broadcast Service)	contemporary MOR, news, talk	DYCF	1 kW	Boracay
91.1 FM	Yes FM Boracay	Pacific Broadcasting System	music, news	DYYR	500 W	Boracay
91.7 FM	Love Radio Boracay	Pacific Broadcasting System	music, news	—N/a	500 W	Boracay
93.5 FM	93.5 Easy Rock Boracay	Cebu Broadcasting Company	music, news	DYEY	500 W	Boracay
98.1 FM	iFM Boracay	Radio Mindanao Network	music, news	DYBS	2 KW	Boracay
106.1 FM	Radio Boracay	One Media Boracay	beach music, contemporary hits, talk radio	DYJV	2 KW	Boracay

== Capiz ==
=== AM stations ===
Frequency	Name	Company	Format	Call Sign	Power	Location Covered
657 AM	RMN Roxas	Radio Mindanao Network	Drama, News, Public Affairs, Talk	DYVR	5 KW	Roxas City
900 AM	Bombo Radyo Roxas	People's Broadcasting Service, Inc. (Bombo Radyo Philippines)	drama, news, public affairs, talk	DYOW	5 KW	Roxas City
1296 AM	Radyo Budyong Roxas	Intercontinental Broadcasting Corporation	News, Public Affairs, Talk	DYJJ	5 KW	Roxas City

=== FM stations ===
Frequency	Name	Company	Format	Call Sign	Power	Location Covered
88.1 FM	Spirit FM Roxas	Catholic Bishops Conference of the Philippines (Archdiocese of Capiz; a member of the Catholic Media Network)	Contemporary MOR, OPM, religious radio	DYCW	5 KW	Roxas City
88.9 FM	CAP Rhythm	Tagbilaran Broadcasting System	Contemporary MOR	DYCN	5 kW	Roxas City
93.9 FM	iFM Roxas	Radio Mindanao Network	Contemporary MOR, News, Talk	DYVR	5 KW	Roxas City
95.7 FM	Brigada News FM Roxas	Century Broadcasting Network (Brigada Mass Media Corporation)	Contemporary MOR, News, Talk	DYYB	5 kW	Roxas City
97.7 FM	Radyo Todo Capiz	Todo Media (affiliated with the Philippine Broadcasting Service)	Contemporary MOR, News, Talk	DYCL	2 KW	Panay, Capiz
100.9 FM	K5 News FM Roxas	Hypersonic Broadcasting Center (operated by 5K Broadcasting Network)	Contemporary MOR, News, Talk	DYHG	5 KW	Roxas City
102.5 FM	Baskog Radyo	Green Waves Production (Sarraga Integrated and Management Corporation)	Contemporary MOR, News, Talk	DYOP	5 KW	Roxas City
103.7 FM	Star FM Roxas	People's Broadcasting Service (Bombo Radyo Philippines)	Contemporary MOR, OPM, News	DYRX	5 KW	Roxas City
105.7 FM	Love Radio Roxas	MBC Media Group (operated by Broadreach Broadcasting Corporation)	Contemporary MOR, OPM	DYML	5 KW	Roxas City
106.5 FM	XFM Roxas	Y2H Broadcasting Network/Multipoint Broadcasting Network	Contemporary MOR, News, Talk	—N/a	5 kW	Roxas City

== Guimaras ==
=== FM stations ===
NOTE: Most radio stations from Iloilo City are receivable in this area.

Frequency	Name	Company	Format	Call Sign	Power	Location Covered
104.3 FM	GBS FM	Guimarasnon Broadcasting Service	contemporary MOR, news, talk	—N/a	5 KW	Jordan, Guimaras
