= KALQ =

KALQ or kalq may refer to:

- KALQ-FM, a radio station (93.5 FM) licensed to serve Alamosa, Colorado, United States
- KALQ keyboard
