= WVDJ =

WVDJ may refer to:

- WYKQ-LP, a low-power radio station (107.9 FM) licensed to serve Aguadilla-Aguada, Puerto Rico, which held the call sign WVDJ-LP from 2015 to 2019
- WRLY-LP, a low-power radio station (93.5 FM) licensed to serve Raleigh, North Carolina, United States, which held the call sign WVDJ-LP from 2003 to 2013
