= KWDR =

KWDR may refer to:

- KTRI (FM), a radio station (93.5 FM) licensed to serve Royal City, Washington, United States, which held the call sign KWDR from 2006 to 2023
- Northeast Georgia Regional Airport (ICAO code KWDR)
