= WCCA =

WCCA may refer to:

- Wartime Civilian Control Administration
- West Covina, California, a city located in California
- WCCA-LP, a low-power radio station (93.5 FM) licensed to Scottsville, Virginia, United States
- Web Cartoonists' Choice Awards
- Wilkinson County Christian Academy, a segregation academy in Woodville, Mississippi
- Worshipful Company of Chartered Architects, the 97th Livery Company of the City of London
- Worst-case circuit analysis, an acronym used in electrical/electronics engineering
- WYAY (FM), a radio station (106.3 FM) licensed to Shallotte, North Carolina, United States, which used the call sign WCCA from September 1990 to July 2003
