= KTRI =

KTRI may refer to:

- Tri-Cities Regional Airport (ICAO code KTRI)
- KTRI (FM), a radio station (93.5 FM) licensed to serve Royal City, Washington, United States
- KCKH, a radio station (95.9 FM) licensed to serve Mansfield, Missouri, United States, which held the call sign KTRI-FM from 1978 to 2018
