= CIHS =

CIHS may refer to:

- CIHS-FM, a radio station in Wetaskiwin, Alberta, Canada
- Cambridge-Isanti High School, Cambridge, Minnesota, United States
- Channel Islands High School, Oxnard, California, United States
- Chinese independent high school, a private high school in Malaysia providing secondary education using Chinese language as a medium of instruction
