= Malay, Aklan =

Malay
- Municipality
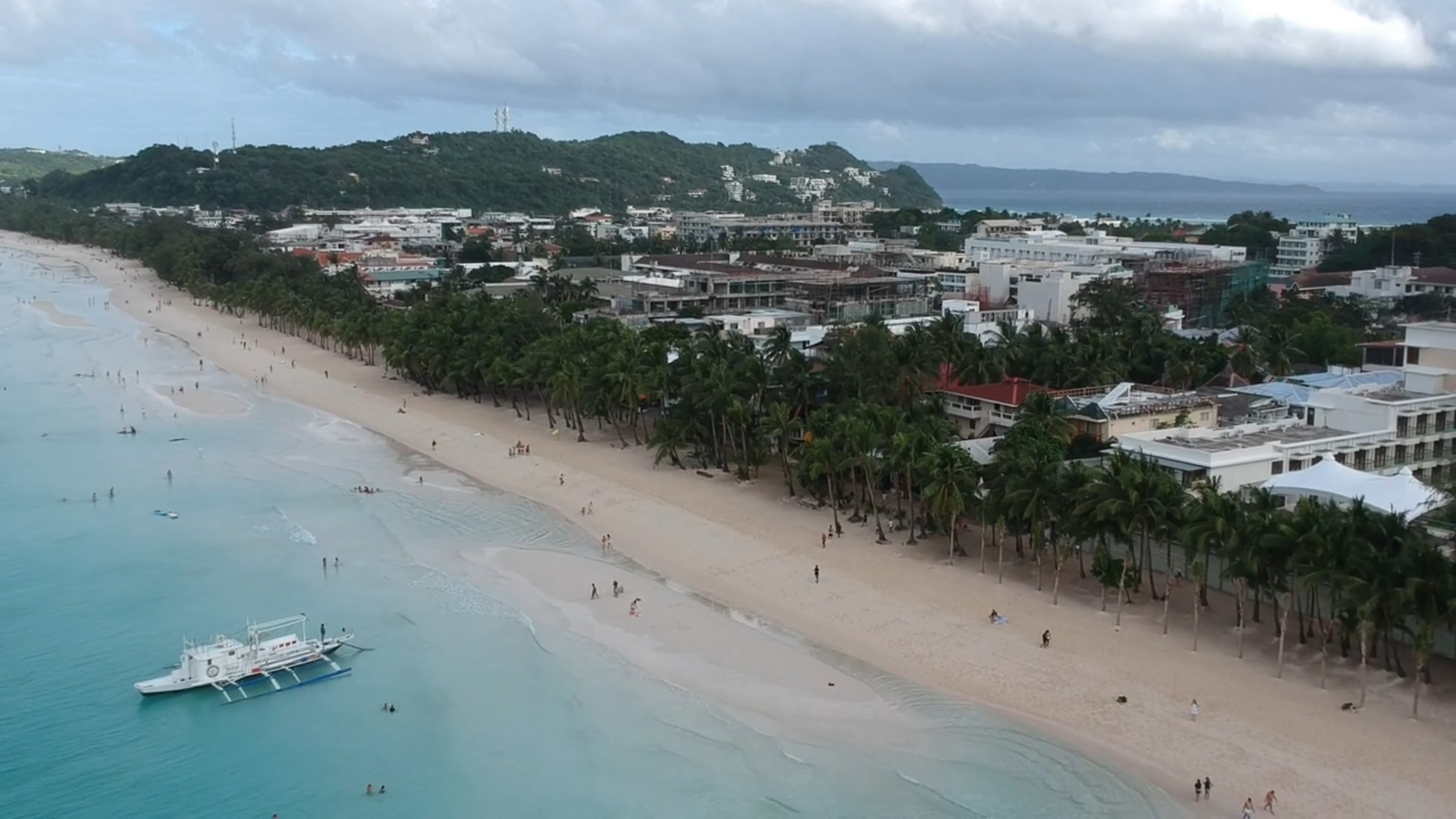
- Boracay skyline

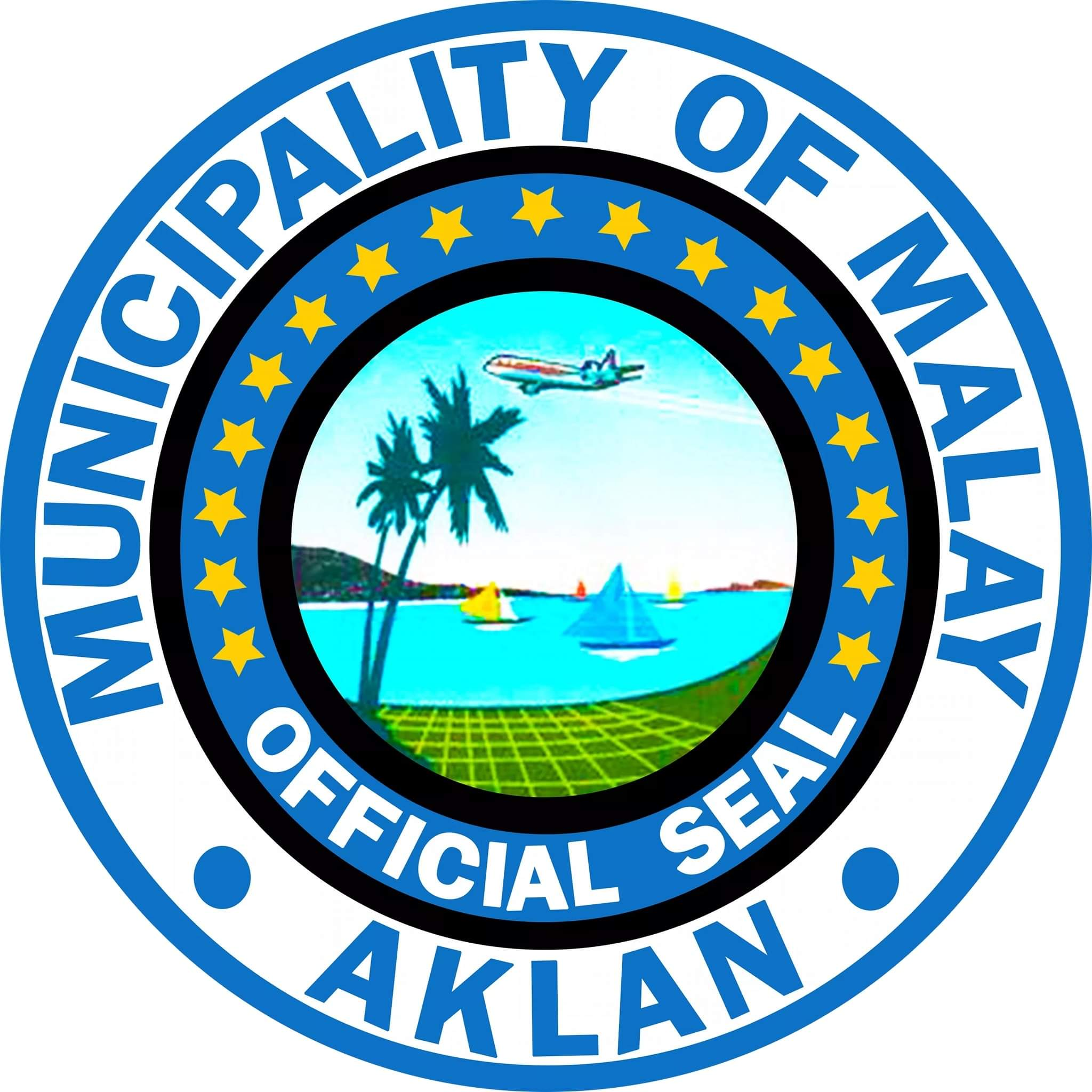
- Flag Seal

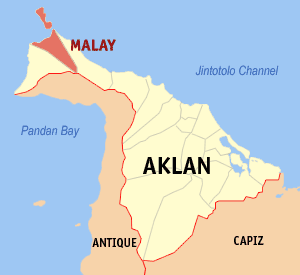
- Map of Aklan with Malay highlighted
- Interactive map of Malay
- Location within the Philippines
- Coordinates: 11°53′59″N 121°54′34″E
- Country: Philippines
- Region: Western Visayas
- Province: Aklan
- District: 2nd district
- Founded: 15 June 1949
- Barangays: 17 (see Barangays)

Government
  - Type: Sangguniang Bayan
  - Mayor: Frolibar S. Bautista
  - Vice Mayor: Niño Carlos F. Cawaling
  - Representative: Teodorico T. Haresco Jr.
  - Municipal Council: Members: Natalie C. Paderes; Lloyd B. Maming; Junthir L. Flores; Dalidig Y. Sumndad; Jhonnel T. Casidsid; Alan C. Palma; Maria Victoria S. Aguirre; Dante C. Pagsuguiron
  - Electorate: 40,565 voters (2025)

Area
  - Total: 66.01 km^{2} (25.49 sq mi)
- Elevation: 53 m (174 ft)
- Highest elevation: 884 m (2,900 ft)
- Lowest elevation: 0 m (0 ft)

Population (2024 census)
  - Total: 64,723
  - Density: 980.5/km^{2} (2,539/sq mi)
  - Households: 15,232
- Demonym: Malaynon

Economy
  - Income class: 1st municipal income class
  - Poverty incidence: 2.97% (2023)
  - Revenue: ₱ 1,002 million (2024)
  - Assets: ₱ 2,031 million (2024)
  - Expenditure: ₱ 927.9 million (2024)
  - Liabilities: ₱ 759.5 million (2024)

Service provider
  - Electricity: Aklan Electric Cooperative (AKELCO)
- Time zone: UTC+8 (PST)
- ZIP code: 5608
- PSGC: 0600412000
- IDD : area code: +63 (0)36
- Native languages: Aklanon; Ati; Hiligaynon; Tagalog

Malay /mɑːˈlaɪ/, officially the Municipality of Malay (Aklanon: Banwa it Malay; Hiligaynon: Banwa sang Malay; Tagalog: Bayan ng Malay), is a municipality in the province of Aklan, Philippines. According to the 2024 census, it has a population of 64,723 people.

The municipality is notable for encompassing Boracay island, a major resort destination in the Philippines. The town is the richest municipality in terms of revenue and considered the youngest amongst all municipalities in Aklan province. It is also the northernmost town on the island of Panay.

== History ==
Malay, as well as the rest of Aklan, was previously part of the province of Capiz. It was under the jurisdiction of the municipality of Buruanga itself ruling over the town of Ibajay which was the intermediary for Malay its' surroundings at Northwestern Panay island. The 1818 census shows that there were 1,268 native families and also a relatively decent number of 30 Spanish-Filipino families that also lived in Ibajay, Malay and also Boracay.

The municipality of Malay was created on June 15, 1949, through Republic Act No. 381 and the help of Claro Tumaob, out of various portions of the municipality of Buruanga, then part of Capiz. It included the following barangays: Malay (poblacion, seat of local government), Dumlog, Cabulihan, Balusbos, Nabaoy, Cubay Norte, Cubay Sur, Cogon, Argao, Sambiray, Caticlan, Manoc-Manoc, Balabag, Yapak, Motag, Napaan, and Naasog. On April 25, 1956, Malay became part of the newly created province of Aklan, along with several other towns of Capiz.

It was hit severely by typhoon Seniang on December 9–10, 2006, with much destruction and damage of homes and infrastructure.

== Geography ==
Malay is located at 11°53′59″N 121°54′34″E. It is 72 kilometers (45 mi) west of the provincial capital Kalibo, 230 kilometers (140 mi) from Iloilo City, 158 kilometres (98 mi) from Roxas City, and 168 kilometers (104 mi) from San Jose de Buenavista.

According to the Philippine Statistics Authority, the municipality has a land area of 66.01 square kilometers (25.49 sq mi) constituting 3.62% of the 1,821.42-square-kilometer (703.25 sq mi) total area of Aklan.

=== Climate ===
Climate data for Malay
Month	Jan	Feb	Mar	Apr	May	Jun	Jul	Aug	Sep	Oct	Nov	Dec	Year
Mean daily maximum °C (°F)	28 (82)	29 (84)	29 (84)	27 (81)	32 (90)	31 (88)	29 (84)	30 (86)	31 (88)	30 (86)	29 (84)	28 (82)	29 (85)
Mean daily minimum °C (°F)	23 (73)	24 (75)	24 (75)	23 (73)	25 (77)	25 (77)	24 (75)	25 (77)	25 (77)	25 (77)	24 (75)	24 (75)	24 (76)
Average rainfall mm (inches)	102 (4.0)	27 (1.1)	30 (1.2)	129 (5.1)	120 (4.7)	237 (9.3)	189 (7.4)	186 (7.3)	126 (5.0)	231 (9.1)	162 (6.4)	90 (3.5)	1,629 (64.1)
Average rainy days	14	12	9	11	20	20	21	22	19	21	17	17	203
Source: World Weather Online

=== Barangays ===
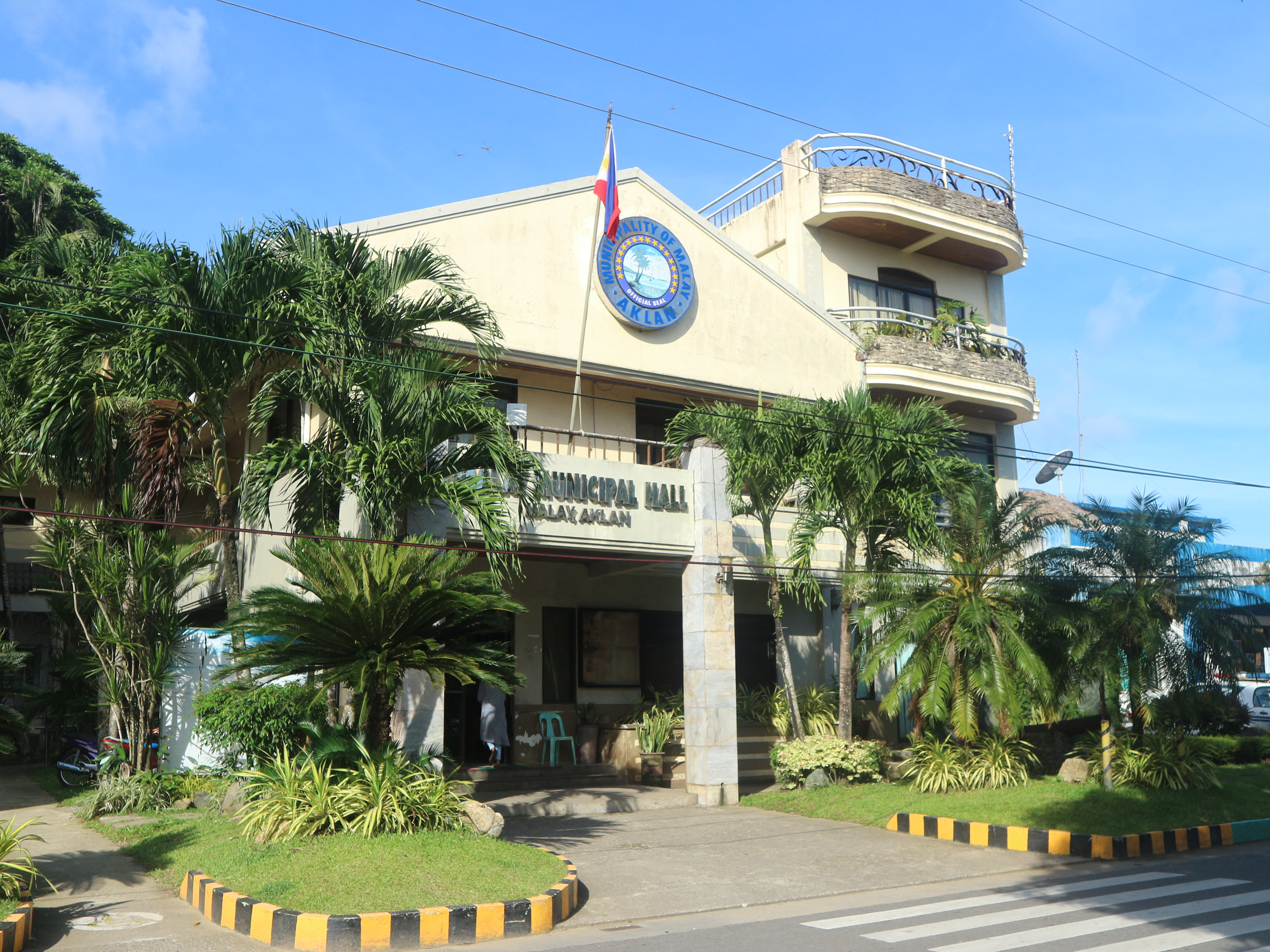
Malay Municipal Hall

Malay is politically subdivided into 17 barangays. Each barangay consists of puroks and some have sitios.

There are 3 barangays (Balabag, Manoc-Manoc, and Yapak) of which situated within Boracay Island, while the rest are in mainland Malay.

PSGC	Barangay	Population			±% p.a.	
		2024		2010		
060412001	Argao	1.9%	1,213	1,078	▴	0.82%
060412002	Balabag	19.0%	12,296	11,076	▴	0.72%
060412003	Balusbus	2.0%	1,310	1,079	▴	1.35%
060412004	Cabulihan	1.2%	772	575	▴	2.06%
060412005	Caticlan	12.4%	7,996	6,593	▴	1.34%
060412006	Cogon	1.0%	647	544	▴	1.21%
060412007	Cubay Norte	0.6%	365	327	▴	0.76%
060412008	Cubay Sur	2.2%	1,423	1,153	▴	1.47%
060412009	Dumlog	1.3%	863	768	▴	0.81%
060412010	Manocmanoc	22.9%	14,810	12,526	▴	1.16%
060412017	Motag	1.4%	903	818	▴	0.69%
060412011	Naasog	0.9%	557	547	▴	0.13%
060412012	Nabaoy	1.9%	1,220	1,025	▴	1.21%
060412013	Napaan	1.2%	751	649	▴	1.01%
060412014	Poblacion	2.0%	1,304	1,255	▴	0.27%
060412015	Sambiray	2.1%	1,382	1,031	▴	2.05%
060412016	Yapak	8.0%	5,161	4,767	▴	0.55%
	Total		64,723	45,811	▴	2.42%

== Demographics ==
Population census of Malay
Year	Pop.	±% p.a.
1960	6,816	—
1970	7,623	+1.12%
1975	8,770	+2.85%
1980	9,120	+0.79%
1990	14,378	+4.66%
1995	19,406	+5.78%
2000	24,519	+5.14%
2007	32,110	+3.79%
2010	45,811	+13.81%
2015	52,973	+2.81%
2020	60,077	+2.68%
2024	64,723	+1.80%
Source: Philippine Statistics Authority

In the 2024 census, Malay had a population of 64,723 people. The population density was 980 inhabitants per square kilometer (2,500/sq mi).

=== Languages ===
Aklanon language Malaynon is the predominant language of Malay. Kinaray-a is also used due to Malay’s proximity to Antique. Hiligaynon is also widely spoken and understood in the municipality. Tagalog and English are also used particularly in Caticlan and Boracay to communicate with local and foreign tourists alike.

== Economy ==
Poverty incidence of Malay (%)

Source: Philippine Statistics Authority

Because of its robust tourism industry, the municipality is now considered as having the strongest economy in all the municipalities in the region and the richest municipality of Aklan in terms of income and annual budget. The tourism industry of Boracay became the catalyst of its economic growth that brought many investors to come and helped transform the municipality into a cosmopolitan area.

== Transportation ==
=== Air ===
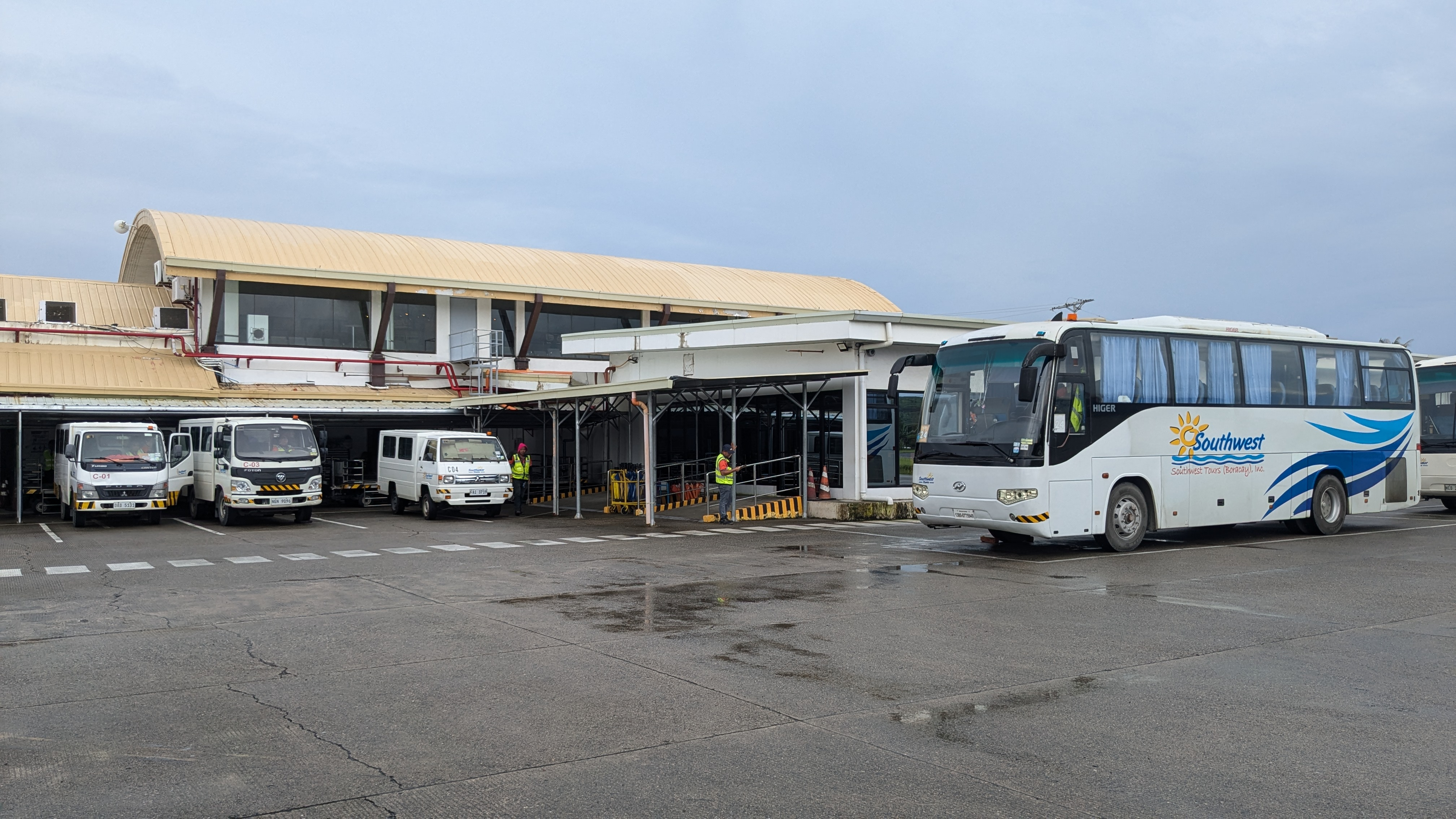
Godofredo P. Ramos Airport terminal building in Caticlan

Malay has one airport, officially named Godofredo P. Ramos Airport, but more popularly known as Caticlan Airport or Boracay Airport. The airport's area is also extended to the adjacent town of Nabas. Only small aircraft were allowed to land on the 950-meter (3,120 ft) runway. The runway was extended to 1,800 meters (5,900 ft) in 2016, allowing bigger aircraft like the Airbus A320 to land at the airport.

=== Sea ===
Caticlan Jetty Port

The Caticlan Jetty Port, one of the ports along the Strong Republic Nautical Highway, serves as a gateway to Boracay island, Roxas, Oriental Mindoro, Bulalacao, Oriental Mindoro, and Batangas City.

The Tabon Port is often used outside the dry season.

=== Ground Transportation ===
Malay uses the electrics Sikad in Boracay island.

=== Bus ===
Malay is also using the hop on hop off shuttle service in Boracay island.

== Education ==
The Malay Schools District Office governs all educational institutions within the municipality. It oversees the management and operations of all private and public, from primary to secondary schools.

=== Primary and elementary schools ===
- Agape Boracay Academy
- Argao Elementary School
- Balabag Elementary School
- Beth Shalom Academy
- Boracay Ati-Multipurpose Cooperative-Tubuanan Ati Learning Center
- Boracay Baptist Learning Center
- Boracay European International School
- Boracay Island Global Academy
- Boracay Island Integrated Academy
- Boracay Precious Jewel Academy
- Carla Ati Learning Center
- Caticlan Elementary School
- Cubay Elementary School
- First Love Jubilee Academy
- Goshen School of Technology and Humanities
- Kabulihan-Dumlog Primary School
- Malay Agape Sunbeam Academy
- Malay Elementary School
- Malay Mustard Seed Christian Academy
- Manocmanoc Elementary School
- Mission of Love Integrated School
- Mountain of God Academy
- Naasog Elementary School
- Nabaoy Elementary School
- Napa-an Primary School
- River of Knowledge Foundation Academy
- Sambiray Primary School
- Yapak Elementary School

=== Secondary schools ===
- Boracay National High School (Main)
- Boracay National High School (Manoc-Manoc Extension)
- Conperey Integrated Learning School
- Lamberto H. Tirol National High School
- Malay National High School

== Healthcare ==
Malay is being served by 2 hospitals both of which are owned by the government.

- Don Ciriaco Tirol Memorial Hospital
- Malay Municipal Hospital

== Media ==
=== FM Radio Stations ===
- Radyo Todo Aklan 88.5 (Philippine Broadcasting Service/Todo Media, Inc.)
- 89.7 DYIE FM (Far East Broadcasting Company)
- 91.1 Yes the Best (Manila Broadcasting Company/Philippine Broadcasting Corporation)
- 93.5 Easy Rock (Manila Broadcasting Company/Cebu Broadcasting Company)
- 94.9 Brigada News FM (Brigada Mass Media Corporation)
- 97.3 Boracay Beach Radio (Interactive Broadcast Media)
- 98.1 iFM (Radio Mindanao Network)
- 106.1 FM2 Boracay (Philippine Broadcasting Service/One Media Boracay)

=== Cable Television ===
- Kalibo Cable TV Network
- Paradise Cable TV
