= XHLAZ-FM =

Radio station in Tamaliagua/Ciudad Guzmán, Jalisco, Mexico

- Tamaliagua/Ciudad Guzmán, Jalisco; Mexico
- Frequency: 93.5 FM
- Branding: La Más Picuda

Programming
- Format: Grupera

Ownership
- Owner: Grupo Radiorama; (Voler, S.A. de C.V.)

History
- First air date: August 26, 1964 (concession)
- Call sign meaning: "La Z" (former name)

Technical information
- Licensing authority: CRT
- Class: B1
- ERP: 25 kW
- HAAT: 248.6 m (816 ft)
- Transmitter coordinates: 19°50′51.26″N 103°29′58.62″W

Links
- Webcast: Listen live
- Website: laluperrona.com

XHLAZ-FM is a radio station on 93.5 FM in Tamaliagua and Ciudad Guzmán, Jalisco, Mexico, broadcasting from a transmitter in Gómez Farías Municipality. It is owned by Grupo Radiorama and carries a grupera format known as La Más Picuda.

== History ==
XEWP-AM 1420 received its concession on August 26, 1964. It was owned by Carmen Rodríguez de Méndez and operated from Sayula as a 500-watt daytimer.

In 1977, XEWP was sold to José Antonio Aguilar Herrera and became XEKMX-AM, later moving to 600 kHz and increasing power to 5,000 watts. During this time period, it was known as La Super X. It changed its calls again, to XELAZ-AM. The callsign change reflected the "La Z" name in use at that time.

XELAZ was approved to migrate to FM as XHLAZ-FM in 2011. The station used the La Mejor brand from MVS Radio from that time until the end of April 2022. On June 1, became a new format as La Luperrona with a Regional Mexican format until ceased the format in April 2025.
