= XHLU-FM =

Radio station in Ciudad Serdán, Puebla, México

- Ciudad Serdán, Puebla; Mexico
- Frequency: 93.5 MHz
- Branding: La Ke Buena

Programming
- Format: Regional Mexican
- Affiliations: Radiópolis

Ownership
- Owner: Víctor Manuel Bautista Paulino

History
- First air date: October 29, 1959 (concession)

Technical information
- ERP: 6 kW
- Transmitter coordinates: 18°59′15″N 97°27′17″W

Links
- Webcast: Listen live
- Website: lakebuena935fm.com.mx

XHLU-FM is a radio station on 93.5 FM in Ciudad Serdán, Puebla. It carries the La Ke Buena Regional Mexican format from Radiópolis.

== History ==
Logo used until 2021.

XELU-AM 1340 received its concession on October 29, 1959. The 250-watt station was owned by Antonio Bautista García. The AM station would end its life transmitting with 10,000 watts during the day and 5,000 at night.

XELU was cleared to migrate to FM in 2011. In 2014, ownership was passed from Victoria Hernández Cruz, who had bought it in 1989, to Víctor Manuel Bautista Paulino.
