= CHLA-FM =

Former legislative radio station in Whitehorse, Yukon, Canada

- Whitehorse, Yukon; Canada
- Frequency: 93.5 FM

Programming
- Format: Yukon Legislative Assembly proceedings and tourist information

Ownership
- Owner: Parliamentary Broadcasting Society

History
- First air date: 1984

Technical information
- Class: A1
- ERP: 174 watts
- HAAT: −218.3 meters (−716 ft)

CHLA-FM is a Canadian radio station, which aired at 93.5 FM in Whitehorse, Yukon. Licensed to the Parliamentary Broadcasting Society, a committee of the Yukon Legislative Assembly (YLA), the station airs the Assembly's legislative proceedings, as well as a recorded loop of tourist information when the legislature is not in session.

In 1984, the station was licensed.

== Funding issues and closure ==
The station's license was revoked by the CRTC in 2003 due to funding issues.

== After closure ==
The frequency is still/again being used for the indicated purpose is available on the website of the YLA and also from a news release in June 2015. This suggests the station may be operating under low-power license-exempt conditions. as allowed under current CRTC regulations.
