= DYCL =

Philippine radio station

Radyo Todo Capiz (DYCL)
- Panay; Philippines
- Broadcast area: Capiz, Parts of Aklan
- Frequency: 97.7 MHz
- Branding: Radyo Todo 97.7

Programming
- Languages: Capiznon, Filipino
- Format: Contemporary MOR, News, Talk
- Network: Radyo Todo
- Affiliations: Presidential Broadcast Service

Ownership
- Owner: Todo Media, Inc.

History
- First air date: February 1, 2016

Technical information
- Licensing authority: NTC
- Power: 5,000 watts

DYCL (97.7 FM), broadcasting as Radyo Todo 97.7, is a radio station owned and operated by Todo Media, Inc. The station's studio and transmitter are located at Room #06, 2nd Floor, MDJ Building, Poblacion Ilawod, Panay, Capiz.

== History ==
In 2024, the station moved from Brgy. 3, Roxas to its present location in Brgy. Poblacion Ilawod, Panay, Capiz.

== Todo Media stations ==
Name	Callsign	Frequency	Power	Location
Radyo Todo Capiz	DYCL	97.7 MHz	5 kW	Panay
Radyo Todo Aklan	DYCF	88.5 MHz	5 kW	Boracay
