= XHNY-FM =

Radio station in Irapuato, Guanajuato, Mexico

Irapuato, Guanajuato; Mexico
- Frequency: 93.5 MHz
- Branding: Exa FM

Programming
- Format: Spanish & English Top 40 (CHR)
- Affiliations: MVS Radio

Ownership
- Owner: Sucesores de Sergio Olivares Gascón, S.A. de C.V.
- Operator: MVS Radio

History
- First air date: April 23, 1971 (concession)

Technical information
- ERP: 30,030 watts

Links
- Webcast: Listen live
- Website: exafm.com/plaza/irapuato/

XHNY-FM is radio station on 93.5 FM in Irapuato, Guanajuato, Mexico. It carries the Exa FM pop format from MVS Radio.
