= KGVL =

- Greenville, Texas; United States
- Frequency: 1400 kHz
- Branding: ESPN 1400

Programming
- Format: Sports radio
- Affiliations: ESPN Radio

Ownership
- Owner: Christie Lynn Tate and Jonathan Tate Ellis; (E Radio Network, LLC)
- Sister stations: KIKT

History
- First air date: March 26, 1946; 80 years ago
- Call sign meaning: GreenViLle

Technical information
- Licensing authority: FCC
- Facility ID: 21598
- Class: C
- Power: 1,000 watts unlimited
- Transmitter coordinates: 33°10′2.4″N 96°5′55.9″W
- Translators: 105.9 K290AP (Commerce); 107.7 K299BZ (Caddo Mills)

Links
- Public license information: Public file; LMS
- Webcast: Listen Live
- Website: espn1400am.com

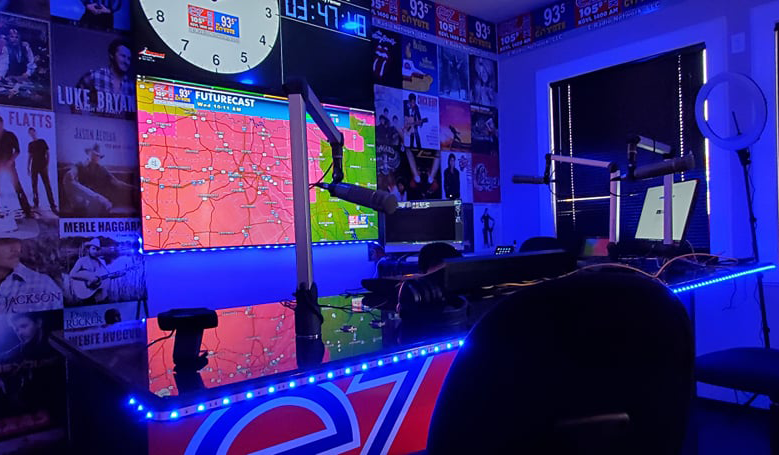

KGVL (1400 AM) is a radio station broadcasting a sports radio format located in Greenville, Texas, United States. The station is currently owned by Christie Lynn Tate and Jonathan Tate Ellis, through licensee E Radio Network, LLC. KGVL also retransmits its signal on 105.9 FM K290AP, which is licensed to Commerce.

== History ==
KGVL signed on in 1946 on 1400 kHz in Greenville Texas. The facility was built by legendary broadcast engineer Truett Kimzey, who in the early 1930s gained fame as the original announcer for the Light Crust Doughboys on KFJZ in Fort Worth ("The Light Crust Doughboys are on the air!") and was one of the earliest engineers to transmit experimental television broadcasts. KGVL originally operated as a "full-service" station, with middle-of-the-road music, local news and sports, live coverage of local events, and Mutual Network and Texas State Network programming. The station's primary owner was Leo Hackney, who managed the station into the 1980s.

Previous logo

The station was formerly owned by Cumulus Media, and was sold to Hunt County Radio, LLC. On October 17, 2017, Hunt County Radio contracted to sell KGVL and KIKT to E Radio Network, LLC in an all-cash transaction. The sale was consummated on March 14, 2018 at a price of $550,000.

On December 5, 2023, it was announced that the station will flip its format to sports under the ESPN Radio affiliation after the holiday season, and would eventually become the first ESPN Radio station in the metroplex since KESN dropped the format in March 2022.

In late September of 2026, the station went silent, along with co-owned KIKT-FM. On September 29, 2026, it returned to the air with Christian praise music.

== Format history ==
Country music 1946–?
Adult Standards ?–1987
Adult Contemporary 1987–?
News Talk ?–1994
Country music 1994–1999
Oldies 1999–? (14K Gold)
Spanish 2005–2007; Radio Exitos 1400 Spanish on weekends only
News Talk ?–2009 (1400 KGVL News/Talk/Sports)
Classic Country 2009–2010 (1400 The Boot)
Oldies 2010–November 2013 (Big 14 GVL)
Classic Country November 2013–February 2018 (105.9 & 1400)
Classic Hits February 2018–December 2023 (EZ Rock 105.9)
Sports radio December 2023 – September 2026 (ESPN 1400)

== See also ==
- EZ Rock - It's also formally name as popular radio network branding that serving some of Canadian cities like Edmonton (1995-2011), Prince Rupert (2011-2021), St. Catharines (2001-2020), Toronto (1995-2009 as CJEZ-FM) and other stations. Note: Ownership it's different in Canada and all of stations are now discontinuing after on May 18, 2021.
