= DYCF =

Philippine radio station

Radyo Todo Aklan (DYCF)
- Malay; Philippines
- Broadcast area: Boracay and surrounding areas
- Frequency: 88.5 MHz
- Branding: Radyo Todo 88.5

Programming
- Languages: Akeanon, Filipino
- Format: Contemporary MOR, News, Talk
- Network: Radyo Todo
- Affiliations: Presidential Broadcast Service

Ownership
- Owner: Todo Media, Inc.

History
- First air date: February 1, 2013 (in Kalibo)

Technical information
- Licensing authority: NTC
- Power: 1,000 watts

Links
- Website: https://www.radyotodo.ph/radyo-todo-aklan-88-5-fm/

DYCF (88.5 FM), broadcasting as Radyo Todo 88.5, is a radio station owned and operated by Todo Media, Inc. The station's studio and transmitter are located along Manggayad Main Rd., Brgy. Manocmanoc, Malay, Aklan.

== Todo Media stations ==
Name	Callsign	Frequency	Power	Location
Radyo Todo Capiz	DYCL	97.7 MHz	5 kW	Panay
Radyo Todo Aklan	DYCF	88.5 MHz	5 kW	Boracay
