= XHEJ-FM =

Radio station in Bahía de Banderas, Nayarit (Puerto Vallarta, Jalisco)

- Bahía de Banderas, Nayarit; Mexico
- Broadcast area: Puerto Vallarta, Jalisco
- Frequency: 93.5 FM
- Branding: La Patrona

Programming
- Format: Regional Mexican

Ownership
- Owner: Alica Medios; (Operador de Medios del Pacífico, S.A. de C.V.)

History
- First air date: August 9, 1967
- Former call signs: XEEJ-AM
- Former frequencies: 650 kHz

Technical information
- Licensing authority: CRT
- Class: B1
- ERP: 25 kW
- HAAT: −22.05 m (−72.3 ft)
- Transmitter coordinates: 20°46′12″N 105°12′27″W

Links
- Webcast: radiohosting.online/..
- Website: vallarta.lapatrona.fm

XHEJ-FM is a radio station on 93.5 FM in Bahía de Banderas, Nayarit, licensed to Puerto Vallarta, Jalisco. The station is owned by Alica Medios, the media arm of Grupo Empresarial Alica, and carries a Regional Mexican format known as La Patrona.

== History ==
XHEJ began its operations as XEEJ-AM, situated at 650 kHz, with a concession awarded to Eva Patiro Pérez on May 22, 1967; the station officially signed on August 9. It was the first radio station to operate in Puerto Vallarta. By the 1980s, the concession was held by Radio Paraíso de Puerto Vallarta, S.A.; it was operated by Grupo ACIR, which then bought the station outright for MXN$1.75 million in 2004.

The station received authorization to migrate to FM as XHEJ-FM on 93.5 in 2011, the same year it was acquired by Alica Medios. XHEJ was Alica's first radio station outside of Acaponeta and Tecuala, Nayarit, but it broadcasts from Bahía de Banderas in that state. XEEJ, however, was given a continuity obligation to serve 28,075 potential listeners who did not receive other radio service. In 2018, the Federal Telecommunications Institute awarded a social concession to Carlos Martínez Macías to build and operate a new station on 650 kHz, XECSBK-AM; it then ordered XEEJ-AM to cease operations in November 2019, by which time it was already silent.
