= WRDJ-LP =

- Merritt Island, Florida; United States
- Broadcast area: Melbourne, Florida
- Frequency: 93.5 MHz

Programming
- Format: Religious

Ownership
- Owner: Calvary Chapel of Merritt Island, Inc.

Technical information
- Licensing authority: FCC
- Facility ID: 135626
- Class: L1
- ERP: 100 watts
- HAAT: 16 meters
- Transmitter coordinates: 28°25′22.00″N 80°42′20.00″W

Links
- Public license information: LMS
- Webcast: Listen Live
- Website: wrdj.com

WRDJ-LP (93.5 FM) is a radio station broadcasting a religious radio format. The station also broadcasts local news, weather, surf reports and information during NASA events such as launches. Licensed to Merritt Island, Florida, United States, the station serves the Melbourne, Florida, area. The station is currently owned by Calvary Chapel of Merritt Island, Inc.
