= WKWX =

- Savannah, Tennessee; United States
- Frequency: 93.5 MHz
- Branding: 93 WKWX

Programming
- Format: Country

Ownership
- Owner: Melco, Inc.

Technical information
- Licensing authority: FCC
- Facility ID: 65212
- Class: C3
- ERP: 25,000 watts
- HAAT: 91 meters (299 feet)
- Transmitter coordinates: 35°17′08″N 88°10′03″W

Links
- Public license information: Public file; LMS
- Webcast: Listen Live
- Website: wkwx.com

WKWX (93.5 FM, "93 WKWX") is a radio station licensed to serve Savannah, Tennessee, United States. The station is owned by Melco, Inc. It airs a country music format.

The station was assigned the WKWX call letters by the Federal Communications Commission on June 19, 1980.
