= WLGR =

Variety hits radio station in Warrensburg, New York

- Warrensburg, New York; United States
- Broadcast area: Glens Falls, New York
- Frequency: 93.5 MHz
- Branding: 93.5 Lake FM

Programming
- Format: Classic hits

Ownership
- Owner: Border Media LLC; (Border Media LLC)

History
- First air date: 2007 (as WSLP at 93.3)
- Former call signs: WSLP (2006–2021); WPLA (2021)
- Former frequencies: 93.3 MHz (2007–2021)
- Call sign meaning: Lake George Radio

Technical information
- Licensing authority: FCC
- Facility ID: 165944
- Class: A
- ERP: 120 watts
- HAAT: 404 meters
- Transmitter coordinates: 43°25′13″N 73°45′34″W

Links
- Public license information: Public file; LMS
- Webcast: Listen Live
- Website: lakefm.com

WLGR (93.5 FM) is a radio station broadcasting a classic hits format. Licensed to Warrensburg, New York, United States, the station is owned by Border Media LLC.

== History ==
On July 1, 2019, the then-WSLP rebranded as "The Mix".

On September 18, 2020, WSLP changed its format from adult contemporary to variety hits, branded as "Lake FM".

On January 29, 2021, the WSLP call sign and "Lake FM" variety hits format moved from 93.3 FM Saranac Lake to 100.7 FM Ray Brook, while 93.3 FM changed its call sign to WPLA.

On May 1, 2021, WPLA began broadcasting at 93.5 FM in Warrensburg, New York with a variety hits format, branded as "Lake George Radio". On July 13, the station changed its call sign to WLGR to match. This would eventually clear the way for the current WSLP to return to the 93.3 frequency.

On September 9, 2024, WLGR changed their format from adult hits to classic hits, branded as "93.5 Lake FM".

== Previous logos ==
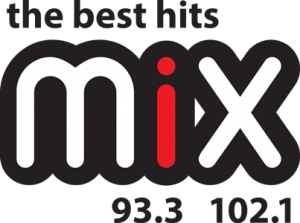
