= DYJV =

Radio Boracay (DYJV)
Malay; Philippines
- Broadcast area: Boracay and surrounding areas
- Frequency: 106.1 MHz
- Branding: Radio Boracay 106.1

Programming
- Languages: English (primary); Akeanon, Filipino (talk programs)
- Format: CHR/Top 40, Island, Talk

Ownership
- Owner: One Media Boracay; (Capricom Production and Management)

History
- First air date: 2006
- Former names: FM2 (2017–2022)

Technical information
- Licensing authority: NTC
- Class: A / B / C
- Power: 2,000 watts

DYJV (106.1 FM), broadcasting as Radio Boracay 106.1, is a Radio Station owned and Operated by Capricom Production and Management through its subsidiary One Media Boracay Inc. Its studios and main office are located at Zone 5, Boracay Bulabog Rd., Malay, Aklan.

== History ==
Radio Boracay began broadcasting around in 2006 with a mix of Top 40 and island music.

In March 2009, the station underwent changes with the arrival of longtime broadcaster and former Malay municipal councilor Jonathan Cabrera. Under Cabrera's management, Radio Boracay added news and talk programming to the lineup.

From 2010 to 2013, Radio Boracay was an affiliate of Magic 89.9, airing Good Times and Boys Night Out. In 2014, it started airing a local morning program Radyo Birada.

From 2017 to 2022, Radio Boracay was an affiliate of the government-owned Philippine Broadcasting Service. At that time, it carried a classic hits format as 106.1 FM2.
