= WHMI-FM =

Howell, Michigan; United States
- Broadcast area: Brighton, Michigan
- Frequency: 93.5 MHz
- Branding: FM 93.5

Programming
- Format: Classic hits
- Affiliations: ABC News Radio

Ownership
- Owner: Rodney Krol; (Krol Communications Inc.)

History
- First air date: September 1, 1977
- Call sign meaning: Howell MIchigan

Technical information
- Licensing authority: FCC
- Facility ID: 65917
- Class: A
- ERP: 5,200 watts
- HAAT: 108 meters
- Transmitter coordinates: 42°39′37″N 83°56′23″W

Links
- Public license information: Public file; LMS
- Webcast: Listen Live
- Website: whmi.com

WHMI-FM (93.5 FM) is a radio station broadcasting from the Howell, Michigan area. The station broadcasts a Classic Hits format with local news, sports, traffic and weather and bills itself as Livingston County's Own. It also airs hourly news updates from ABC News Radio. WHMI is owned by Rodney Krol through licensee Krol Communications Inc.

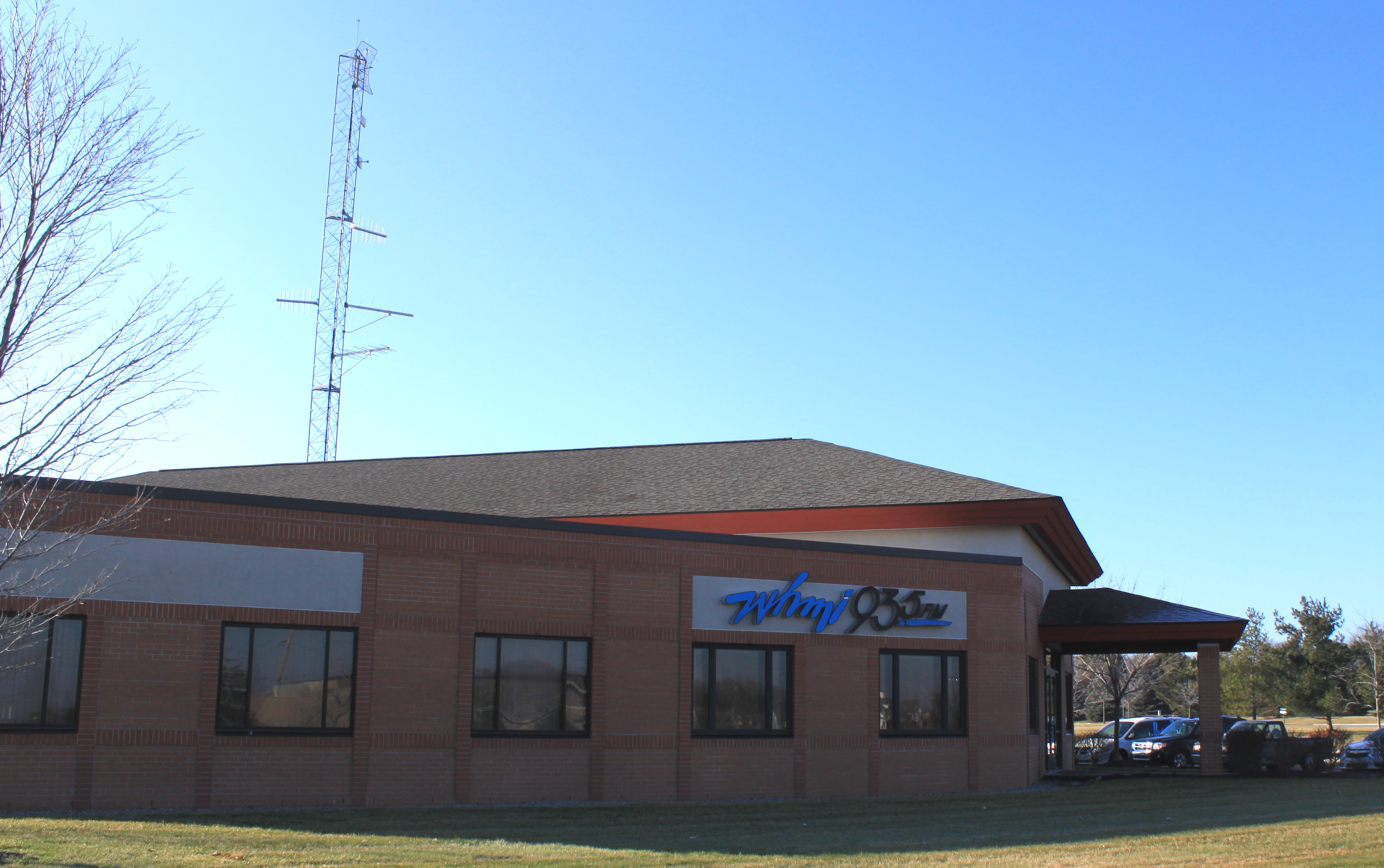
WHMI-FM studios

== History ==
WHMI began as an AM radio station at 1350 kHz in 1957. The call letters could be said to stand for both "Howell, Michigan" and "Heart of Michigan", a reference to an ad campaign of the late 1950s which promoted Livingston County as a good place to live. An FM signal at 93.5 was added in September 1977, simulcasting the AM. Originally, WHMI was a small-town station typical of its era, with adult contemporary/MOR music and a strong news commitment.

The AM signal, which was inferior to the FM signal, was silenced in 1995. Since then WHMI has been solely on FM. During the late 1990s, WHMI's music programming gradually evolved from hot AC into the current "classic hits" format.

In 2001, WHMI moved out of its longtime studios on Grand River Avenue in Howell into a state-of-the-art facility at 1277 Parkway Drive in Genoa Township, Michigan.
