= DYRS-FM =

Radyo Natin San Jose (DYRS)
- San Jose de Buenavista; Philippines
- Broadcast area: Southern Antique, Western Iloilo
- Frequency: 91.7 MHz
- Branding: 91.7 Radyo Natin

Programming
- Languages: Karay-a, Filipino
- Format: Community radio
- Network: Radyo Natin Network

Ownership
- Owner: MBC Media Group

History
- First air date: 1997
- Call sign meaning: Radyo San Jose

Technical information
- Licensing authority: NTC
- Power: 1,000 watts

DYRS (91.7 FM), broadcasting as 91.7 Radyo Natin, is a radio station owned and operated by MBC Media Group. Its studio and transmitter are located at Brgy. Funda-Dalipe, San Jose de Buenavista.
