= KYKK (FM) =

Country music radio station in Junction, Texas, United States

- Junction, Texas; United States
- Frequency: 93.5 MHz
- Branding: 93.5 Kicks

Programming
- Format: Country

Ownership
- Owner: Tenn-Vol Corp.

History
- First air date: 1994 (as KAHO)
- Former call signs: KAHO (1994–1998); KOOK (1998–2018)

Technical information
- Licensing authority: FCC
- Facility ID: 57035
- Class: C2
- ERP: 50,000 watts
- HAAT: 150 meters (490 ft)
- Transmitter coordinates: 30°29′31.00″N 100°2′3.00″W

Links
- Public license information: Public file; LMS

KYKK (93.5 FM) is a country music radio station licensed to Junction, Texas, United States. The station is currently owned by Tenn-Vol Corp.

== History ==
The station was assigned the call letters KAHO on April 7, 1994. On September 8, 1998, the station changed its call sign to KOOK. On June 12, 2007, the station was sold to Foster Charitable Foundation.

On June 18, 2018, the station changed its call sign to KYKK. Effective September 7, 2018, the station was sold to Tenn-Vol Corp.
