= KRSS =

- Tarkio, Missouri; United States
- Broadcast area: Maryville, Missouri; Clarinda, Iowa; Shenandoah, Iowa
- Frequency: 93.5 MHz
- Branding: The Cross Radio

Programming
- Format: Christian radio

Ownership
- Owner: Radio Free Ministries, Inc.

History
- First air date: 1978
- Former call signs: KTRX
- Call sign meaning: Cross

Technical information
- Licensing authority: FCC
- Facility ID: 33390
- Class: C3
- ERP: 11,000 watts
- HAAT: 149 meters (489 ft)
- Transmitter coordinates: 40°31′11″N 95°11′03″W

Links
- Public license information: Public file; LMS

KRSS (93.5 FM) is a Christian radio station licensed to Tarkio, Missouri, United States. The station is owned by Radio Free Ministries, Inc.
