= CJAS-FM =

Coordinates: 51°13′45″N 58°38′56″W

- Saint-Augustin, Côte-Nord, Quebec; Canada
- Frequency: 93.5 MHz
- Branding: CJAS 93.5 FM

Programming
- Language: English
- Format: Community radio

Ownership
- Owner: La Radio communautaire de Rivière-Saint-Augustin

History
- First air date: 1987

Technical information
- Licensing authority: CRTC
- Class: A1
- ERP: 100 watts
- HAAT: 91 metres (299 ft)

CJAS-FM is an English language community radio station that operates at 93.5 FM in Saint-Augustin, Quebec, Canada.

Owned by La Radio communautaire de Rivière-Saint-Augustin, the station received CRTC approval in 1987.
