= KNCE =

Radio station in Taos, New Mexico

- Taos, New Mexico; United States
- Broadcast area: Taos, Ranchos de Taos, El Prado
- Frequency: 93.5 MHz
- Branding: True Taos Radio

Programming
- Format: Freeform Variety

Ownership
- Owner: Taos Adventures, LLC

History
- First air date: October 21, 2014

Technical information
- Licensing authority: FCC
- Facility ID: 183377
- Class: A
- Power: 3,000 Watts
- HAAT: −192 meters (−630 ft)
- Transmitter coordinates: 36°23′22.0″N 105°35′9.0″W

Links
- Public license information: Public file; LMS
- Webcast: KNCE Webstream
- Website: KNCE Online

KNCE 93.5FM is a Freeform Variety formatted broadcast radio station licensed in Taos, New Mexico, serving Taos, Ranchos de Taos, and El Prado in New Mexico. KNCE is owned and operated by Taos Adventures, LLC.

KNCE broadcasts out of a 1978 Airstream Excella located on Taos Mesa, beside the Taos Mesa Brewing Mothership. KNCE operates with over 100 volunteer DJs, with live local DJs in studio from at least 7am - midnight every day.
