= KBKG =

Radio station in Corning, Arkansas, US

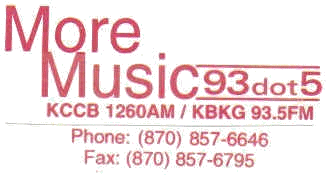
- Corning, Arkansas; United States
- Frequency: 93.5 MHz
- Branding: More Music 93.5 FM

Programming
- Format: Defunct (was Classic hits)

Ownership
- Owner: Shields-Adkins Broadcasting
- Sister stations: KCCB

History
- First air date: 1983
- Last air date: 2024

Technical information
- Licensing authority: FCC
- Facility ID: 60197
- Class: A
- ERP: 3,000 watts
- HAAT: 42 meters (138 ft)
- Transmitter coordinates: 36°24′0″N 90°35′5″W

Links
- Public license information: Public file; LMS

KBKG (93.5 FM) was a radio station broadcasting a classic hits format, licensed to Corning, Arkansas, United States. The station was owned by Shields-Adkins Broadcasting.

KBKG went off the air in late 2024 for financial reasons. The Federal Communications Commission canceled the station's license in September 2026, as it had been off the air for over a year.
