= KMKX =

- Willits, California; United States
- Broadcast area: Fort Bragg-Ukiah area
- Frequency: 93.5 MHz
- Branding: Max 93.5

Programming
- Format: Classic rock
- Affiliations: Westwood One

Ownership
- Owner: Radio Millennium LLC

History
- First air date: 1990
- Former call signs: KZPB (1990–1991); KLLK-FM (1991–1999)

Technical information
- Licensing authority: FCC
- Facility ID: 65699
- Class: B
- ERP: 890 watts
- HAAT: 876 meters (2,874 ft)
- Transmitter coordinates: 39°30′59″N 123°5′21″W
- Translator: 96.5 K243BS (Fort Bragg)

Links
- Public license information: Public file; LMS
- Webcast: Listen live
- Website: maxrock.com

KMKX (93.5 FM) is a radio station broadcasting a classic rock format. Licensed to Willits, California, United States, the station serves the Fort Bragg-Ukiah area. The station is currently owned by Radio Millennium LLC and features programming from Westwood One.

== History ==
The station went on the air as KZPB on 1990-09-20. On 1991-01-28, the station changed its call sign to KLLK-FM, and on 1999-12-22, the call sign was changed to the current KMKX.
