= DYYR =

Radio station in the Philippines

Yes FM Boracay (DYYR)
- Malay; Philippines
- Broadcast area: Boracay and surrounding areas
- Frequency: 91.1 MHz
- Branding: 91.1 Yes FM

Programming
- Languages: Aklanon, Filipino
- Format: Contemporary MOR, OPM
- Network: Yes FM

Ownership
- Owner: MBC Media Group
- Operator: JME Broadcast Resources
- Sister stations: 93.5 Easy Rock

History
- First air date: 1997
- Call sign meaning: Yes Radio

Technical information
- Licensing authority: NTC
- Power: 500 watts
- ERP: 1,000 watts

Links
- Webcast: Listen Live
- Website: Yes The Best Boracay

DYYR (91.1 FM), broadcasting as 91.1 Yes FM, is a radio station owned by MBC Media Group and operated by JME Broadcast Resources. Its studio and transmitter are located in Brgy. Balabag, Malay, Aklan.

Established in 1997, it is the pioneer radio station in Boracay. It was initially under the Radyo Natin network until 1999, when it was relaunched under the Yes FM Network.
