= DYOP =

Radio station in Roxas City, Philippines

Baskog Radyo (DYOP)
- Roxas City; Philippines
- Broadcast area: Capiz, Parts of Aklan
- Frequency: 102.5 MHz
- Branding: Baskog Radyo 102.5

Programming
- Languages: Capiznon, Filipino
- Format: Contemporary MOR, News, Talk

Ownership
- Owner: Sarraga Integrated and Management Corporation

History
- First air date: 2018

Technical information
- Licensing authority: NTC
- Power: 5 kW

Baskog Radyo 102.5 (DYOP 102.5 MHz) is an FM station owned and operated by Sarraga Integrated and Management Corporation. Its studios and transmitter are located at 3rd floor, Arcenas Building, Roxas Avenue, Roxas, Capiz.

On 6 February 2021, the station went off the air after the government of Capiz dismantled its antenna. The provincial government clarified that the station has issues with the antenna, stating that it is a threat to public safety that had to be transferred.
