= KALQ keyboard =

The KALQ keyboard (dubbed after the order the keys appear in the keyboard, analogous to QWERTY) is a keyboard layout that has been developed by researchers at the Montana Tech, University of St Andrews and the Max Planck Institute for Informatics as a split-screen keyboard for thumb-typing, which is claimed to allow a 34% increase in speed of typing for the people who use touchscreen. KALQ was released as a free app, albeit a beta, for Android-based smartphones. Although the KALQ project received some buzz in tech media, as of early 2017, the latest public version is dated October 2013, and still labelled a beta.
