= KOCA-LP =

- Laramie, Wyoming; United States
- Frequency: 93.5 MHz
- Branding: Radio Montanesa: Voz de la Gente

Programming
- Language: Spanish
- Format: Variety

Ownership
- Owner: La Radio Montañesa: Voz de la Gente

History
- First air date: 2003
- Call sign meaning: Original owner Oil Capital Broadcasting Association

Technical information
- Licensing authority: FCC
- Facility ID: 125800
- Class: L1
- ERP: 100 watts
- HAAT: −30.1 meters (−99 ft)
- Transmitter coordinates: 41°18′48″N 105°35′0″W

Links
- Public license information: LMS
- Website: Official website

KOCA-LP (93.5 FM, "Radio Montañesa: Voz de la Gente") is a low-power FM radio station broadcasting a Spanish variety format. Licensed to Laramie, Wyoming, US, the station is currently owned by La Radio Montañesa: Voz de la Gente.

== History ==
The Federal Communications Commission issued a construction permit for the station on June 25, 2001. The station was assigned the KOCA-LP call sign on September 2, 2002, and received its license to cover on May 22, 2003.
