= KPPM-LP =

Radio station in Lake Charles, Louisiana

- Lake Charles, Louisiana; United States
- Broadcast area: Metro Lake Charles
- Frequency: 93.5 MHz
- Branding: KPPM 93.5 FM

Programming
- Format: Black Gospel

Ownership
- Owner: CCW Enterprises of Lake Charles

History
- First air date: June 10, 2014
- Call sign meaning: King Power Praise Music

Technical information
- Licensing authority: FCC
- Facility ID: 197164
- Class: L1
- ERP: 57 watts
- HAAT: 39.6 meters (130 ft)
- Transmitter coordinates: 30°14′5.0″N 93°11′23.0″W

Links
- Public license information: LMS
- Webcast: Listen live
- Website: KPPM-LP Online

KPPM-LP is a Black Gospel formatted broadcast radio station licensed to and serving Lake Charles, Louisiana. KPPM-LP is owned and operated by CCW Enterprises of Lake Charles.
