= XHEVAB-FM =

Radio station in Valle de Bravo, State of Mexico

Valle de Bravo, State of México, Mexico; Mexico
- Broadcast area: Valle de Bravo
- Frequency: 93.5 FM
- Branding: Super Stereo Miled

Programming
- Format: Mexican

Ownership
- Owner: Grupo Miled; (Raúl Libien Santiago)

History
- Call sign meaning: VAlle de Bravo

Technical information
- Class: B
- ERP: 6 kW
- HAAT: -256.45 meters
- Transmitter coordinates: 19°11′42″N 100°08′06″W

Links
- Webcast: http://miledradio.miledmusic.com/valle/
- Website: www.miled.com

XHEVAB-FM is a radio station in Valle de Bravo, State of México. It broadcasts on 93.5 FM and forms part of the Super Stereo Miled network covering most of the State of Mexico.

== History ==
XEVAB-AM 1580 received its concession on September 24, 1979. The 250-watt daytimer migrated to FM in 2011.
