= KIKT =

- Cooper, Texas; United States
- Broadcast area: Greenville, Texas and Vicinity
- Frequency: 93.5 MHz
- Branding: 93.5 The Coyote

Programming
- Format: Country music
- Affiliations: Today's Best Country (Citadel)

Ownership
- Owner: Christie Lynn Tate and Jonathan Tate Ellis; (E Radio Network, LLC)
- Sister stations: KGVL

History
- First air date: August 16, 1979; 46 years ago
- Former call signs: KGVL-FM (1984)
- Call sign meaning: KIcK of Texas

Technical information
- Licensing authority: FCC
- Facility ID: 21597
- Class: C3
- ERP: 18,000 watts
- HAAT: 119.4 meters
- Transmitter coordinates: 33°13′16.00″N 95°41′20.00″W

Links
- Public license information: Public file; LMS
- Website: eradio935.com

KIKT (93.5 FM) is a radio station broadcasting a country music format. Licensed to Cooper, Texas, United States, the station serves the Greenville, Hunt County area. The station is owned by Christie Lynn Tate and Jonathan Tate Ellis, through licensee E Radio Network, LLC.

== History ==
KIKT is owned by E Radio Network, LLC and the station is located in Greenville, Texas. The station went on the air as KGVL-FM on 1984-04-02. On 1984-09-04, the station changed its call sign to the current KIKT.

Has aired different formats, including top 40 in the past. DJs who moved on to major market airwaves include Walt "the Trooper" Troup (KSCS/Dallas), Trey Elliot (KRSR Dallas) and Mike Sheppard (KRSR, KVIL, KZPS, 95.9 The Ranch/ Dallas), Brian Kulis (KVIL Dallas, Sportsradio with Mike Golic Phoenix, Kool FM Denver, KOA traffic Denver, The Doc Washburn National Podcast Talk Show).

With the recent change of logo and motto, "Hometown Radio" KIKT-FM was known as KIK-FM and played a variety of Country favorites.

KIK-FM carried on the tradition of broadcasting local events such as the Annual Rally Around Greenville, Greenville's Business Expo, Greenville Lions Friday Night Lights Tailgate Parties. Currently KIKT carries local area sports as well as local area events.

Cumulus Media announced on June 19, 2009 that it will sell its Greenville cluster (including KIKT) to KGVL Radio, LLC. One year later on June 29, 2010, KGVL Radio, LLC, announced that he would resell the station along with sister station KGVL back to Cumulus.

KIKT was then sold to Hunt County Radio, LLC along with KGVL shortly after Cumulus resumed control. KIKT was then renamed "93.5 The Coyote" Continuing the Country Format.

On October 16, 2017, Hunt County Radio, LLC agreed to sell KIKT and KGVL to E Radio Network, LLC in an all cash transaction. On November 1, 2017, E Radio Network assumed programming control of KIKT 93.5 FM and KGVL 1400 AM. The sale was consummated on March 14, 2018 at a price of $550,000.
