= KALQ-FM =

- Alamosa, Colorado; United States
- Frequency: 93.5 MHz

Programming
- Format: Country music
- Affiliations: Citadel Broadcasting, Westwood One, CNBC Radio

Ownership
- Owner: William Spears, Jr.; (Wolf Creek Broadcasting, LLC)

Technical information
- Licensing authority: FCC
- Facility ID: 12813
- Class: A
- ERP: 2,800 watts
- HAAT: 40.0 meters (131.2 ft)
- Transmitter coordinates: 37°28′20″N 105°51′13″W
- Translator: 103.1 K276AU (Del Norte)

Links
- Public license information: Public file; LMS
- Webcast: Listen Live
- Website: KALQ-FM Online

KALQ-FM (93.5 MHz) is a radio station broadcasting a country music format. Licensed to Alamosa, Colorado, United States, the station is currently owned by William Spears, Jr. through licensee Wolf Creek Broadcasting, LLC, and features programming from Citadel Broadcasting and Westwood One.
