= CIHS-FM =

Radio station in Wetaskiwin, Alberta

Coordinates: 52°59′13″N 113°24′54″W

- Wetaskiwin, Alberta; Canada
- Broadcast area: Wetaskiwin
- Frequency: 93.5 MHz
- Branding: CIHS 93.5 FM

Programming
- Format: Gospel music

Ownership
- Owner: Tag Broadcasting

Technical information
- Class: A
- ERP: 5.12 kW; Horizontal Polarization only
- HAAT: 70.4 metres (231 ft)

Links
- Website: cihsfm.net

CIHS-FM was a Canadian radio station broadcasting a gospel music format at 93.5 FM in Wetaskiwin, Alberta, originally owned by Tag Broadcasting.

The station began broadcasting in the early 2000s after being given approval by the Canadian Radio-television and Telecommunications Commission (CRTC) on November 8, 2000. The station has also gone through some technical changes.

On May 19, 2017, the station's broadcasting license was revoked by the CRTC at the request of then-owner Sukhdev S. Dhillon (operating the station under 902890 Alberta Ltd.). The 93.5 FM frequency is now used in the area by Hawk Radio 93.5FM, broadcasting out of Maskwacis, Alberta.
