= DYEY =

Radio station in the Philippines

Easy Rock Boracay (DYEY)
- Malay; Philippines
- Broadcast area: Boracay and surrounding areas
- Frequency: 93.5 MHz
- Branding: 93.5 Easy Rock

Programming
- Language: English
- Format: Soft adult contemporary
- Network: Easy Rock

Ownership
- Owner: MBC Media Group; (Cebu Broadcasting Company)
- Operator: JME Broadcast Resources
- Sister stations: 91.1 Yes FM

History
- First air date: May 18, 2009
- Call sign meaning: Easy

Technical information
- Licensing authority: NTC
- Power: 500 watts

Links
- Webcast: Listen Live
- Website: Easy Rock Boracay

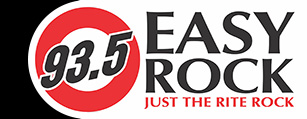
93.5 Easy Rock logo (May 18, 2009-November 14, 2021)

DYEY (93.5 FM), broadcasting as 93.5 Easy Rock, is a radio station owned by MBC Media Group through its licensee Cebu Broadcasting Company and operated by JME Broadcast Resources. Its studio and transmitter are located at Brgy. Balabag, Malay, Aklan.
