= WRLY-LP =

- Raleigh, North Carolina; United States
- Frequency: 93.5 MHz
- Branding: "Oak 93.5"

Programming
- Format: Variety / Music

Ownership
- Owner: Triangle Access Broadcasting, Inc.; (Triangle Access Broadcasting, Inc.)

History
- First air date: September 4, 2013
- Former call signs: WVDJ-LP (2003–2013)
- Former frequencies: 107.9 MHz (2003–2013)
- Call sign meaning: "Raleigh"

Technical information
- Licensing authority: FCC
- Class: LP100
- ERP: 100 Watts
- HAAT: 30 Meters (98 Feet)
- Transmitter coordinates: 35°52′55″N 78°42′56″W

Links
- Public license information: LMS
- Webcast: http://stream.oak935.org:8000/oak935.aac
- Website: http://www.oak935.org/

WRLY-LP, or Oak 93.5 is a community low power FM ("LPFM") radio station operating in Raleigh, North Carolina.

== History ==
Triangle Access Broadcasting, Inc. was awarded the first construction permit to build an LPFM station in the Raleigh area, signing on in October 2003 at 107.9 MHz under the call sign WVDJ-LP.

After nearly a decade on the air, in September 2013, the station would be reborn under a new frequency (moving from 107.9 to 93.5 MHz) and a new call sign, WRLY-LP. These changes were accompanied by a rebranding from "Pulse FM" to "The Oak, 93.5." Positive changes would continue into 2014 as minor technical adjustments would result in significantly increased signal reach, and Triangle Access Broadcasting would reach agreement to syndicate certain programming during early morning hours.

== Format ==
Oak 93.5's format predominantly features adult contemporary music. During morning hours, programming also features local personality John Van Pelt, who provides a variety of severe weather and disaster preparedness tips. Friday afternoon's is known as the hit music hour from 6 PM - 8 PM broadcast by local personality Walt.
