= WCCA-LP =

- Scottsville, Virginia; United States
- Broadcast area: Metro Scottsville
- Frequency: 93.5 MHz
- Branding: WCCA Christian Radio

Programming
- Format: Conservative Christian

Ownership
- Owner: Calvary Baptist Church

History
- First air date: 2005
- Call sign meaning: Christ Calvary

Technical information
- Licensing authority: FCC
- Facility ID: 126026
- Class: L1
- ERP: 100 watts
- HAAT: 2 meters (6.6 ft)
- Transmitter coordinates: 37°50′24.0″N 78°31′0.0″W

Links
- Public license information: LMS
- Website: WCCA-LP Online

WCCA-LP is a Conservative Christian formatted broadcast radio station licensed to and serving Scottsville, Virginia. WCCA-LP is owned and operated by Calvary Baptist Church.
