= KTRI (FM) =

- Royal City, Washington; United States
- Broadcast area: Tri-Cities, Washington
- Frequency: 93.5 MHz
- Branding: 102.3 Tri-Country

Programming
- Format: Country music

Ownership
- Owner: Jacobs Radio Programming, LLC

History
- Former call signs: KWDR (2006–2023)

Technical information
- Licensing authority: FCC
- Facility ID: 166057
- Class: A
- ERP: 210 watts
- HAAT: 508 meters (1,667 ft)
- Translator: 102.3 K272ED (Kennewick)

Links
- Public license information: Public file; LMS
- Website: 1023tricountry.com

KTRI (93.5 FM) is a radio station broadcasting a country music format since June 2019.. Prior to that, it was a smooth jazz station. It focuses on country music from the 1990s to early 2000s. It made the format switch on May 31, 2019. The format is Westwood One "Nash Icon" country.

The station is owned by Jacobs Radio Programming, LLC.

== Translators ==
KTRI broadcasts on the following translators:

- K272ED 102.3 MHz in Kennewick, Washington
