= Panay, Capiz =

Municipality in Capiz, Philippines

Panay Bamban
- Municipality
- Municipality of Panay
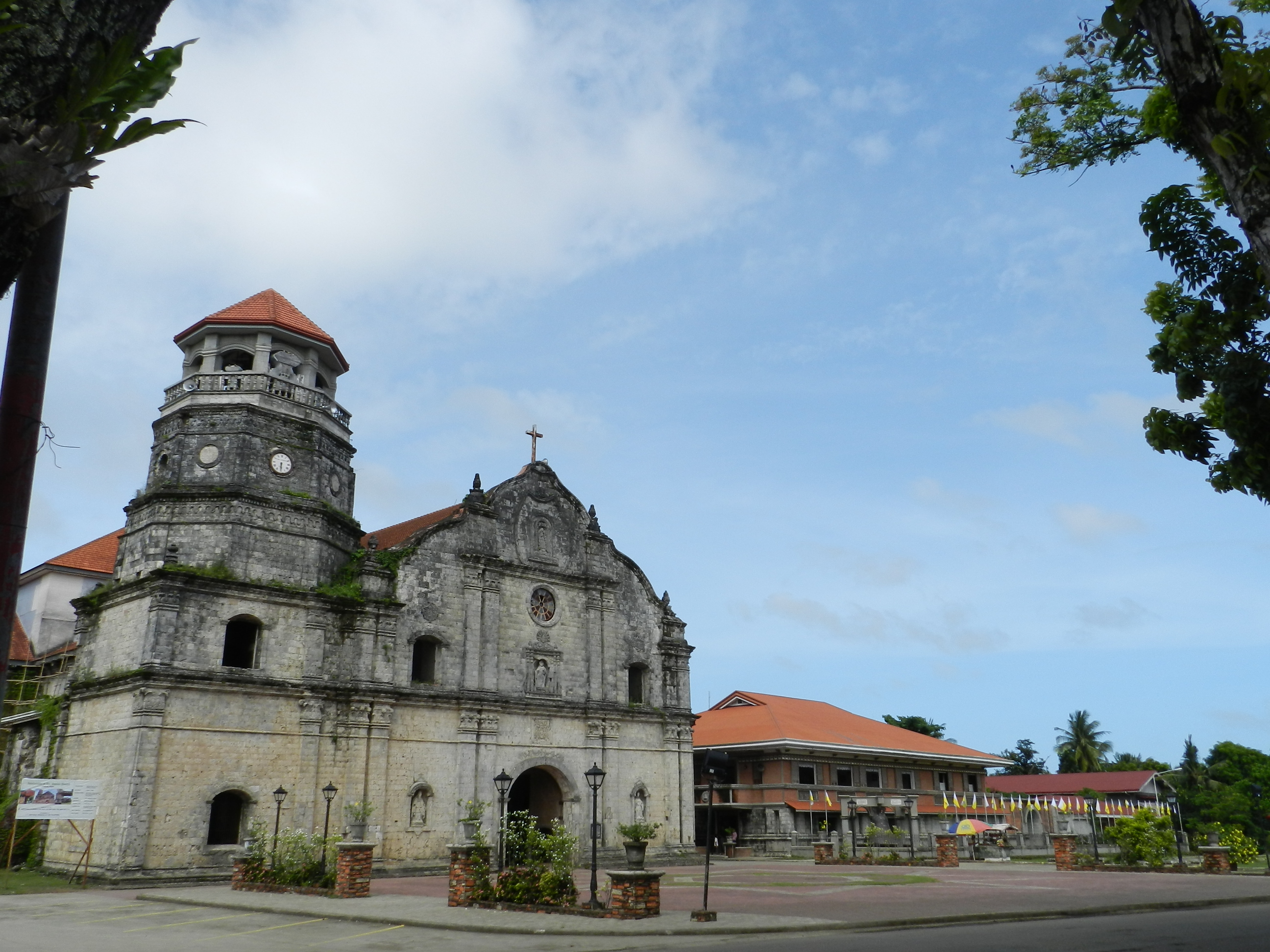
- Panay Church

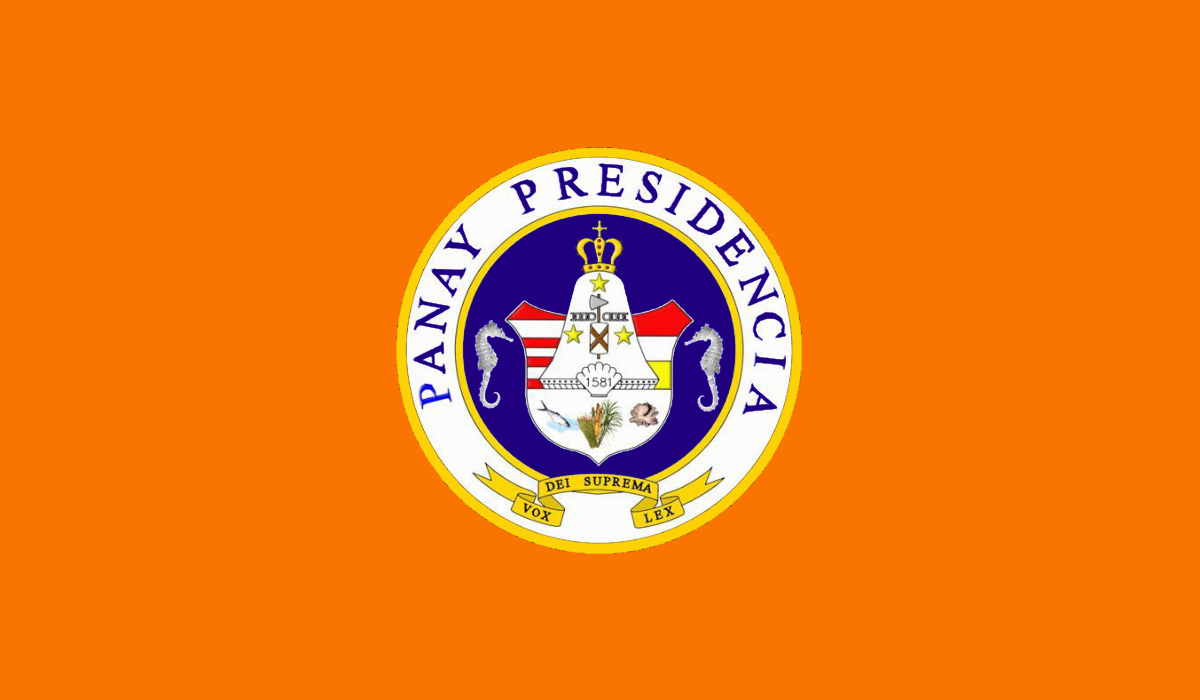
- Flag
- Nickname: Heritage Capital of Capiz
- Motto: HIDLAW, Panay!
- Anthem: Hidlaw Panay
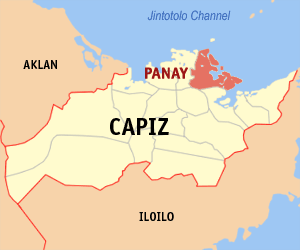
- Map of Capiz with Panay highlighted
- Interactive map of Panay
- Location within the Philippines
- Coordinates: 11°33′19″N 122°47′35″E
- Country: Philippines
- Region: Western Visayas
- Province: Capiz
- District: 1st district
- Founded: 1566
- Barangays: 42 (see Barangays)

Government
  - Type: Sangguniang Bayan
  - Mayor: Jonathan B. Besa (PFP)
  - Vice Mayor: Paolo B. Asis (PFP)
  - Representative: Ivan Howard A. Guintu (IND)
  - Municipal Council: Members: Luis B. Asis; Michaella Angela A. Arches; Lacelou C. Barredo; Alfie T. Benliro; Candido B. Bernales; Rona O. Baes; Lito B. Baria; 1 vacancy
  - Electorate: 34,099 voters (2025)

Area
  - Total: 116.37 km^{2} (44.93 sq mi)
- Elevation: 64 m (210 ft)
- Highest elevation: 2,382 m (7,815 ft)
- Lowest elevation: 0 m (0 ft)

Population (2024 census)
  - Total: 50,946
  - Density: 437.79/km^{2} (1,133.9/sq mi)
  - Households: 12,432

Economy
  - Income class: 2nd municipal income class
  - Poverty incidence: 12.34% (2023)
  - Revenue: ₱ 207.9 million (2024)
  - Assets: ₱ 553.7 million (2024)
  - Expenditure: ₱ 187.5 million (2024)
  - Liabilities: ₱ 67.98 million (2024)

Service provider
  - Electricity: Capiz Electric Cooperative (CAPELCO)
- Time zone: UTC+8 (PST)
- ZIP code: 5801
- PSGC: 061909000
- IDD : area code: +63 (0)36
- Native languages: Capisnon; Hiligaynon; Tagalog
- Website: panaypresidencia.com

Panay, officially the Municipality of Panay (Capiznon/Hiligaynon: Banwa sang Panay; Tagalog: Bayan ng Panay), is a municipality in the province of Capiz, Philippines. According to the 2024 census, it has a population of 50,946 people.

Pronounced as Pan-ay, it used to be the provincial capital of Capiz. It is the site of the famous coral-stone Santa Monica Church, home to the largest Catholic Church bell in Asia.

== History ==
The town originally called Bamban was changed by the early Spaniards to Panay, a word which means “mouth of the river.” This is also the location of a fortress built by Juan de la Isla in late 1570. The Paseo de Evangelización 1566 can be found in the town plaza and was erected through the efforts of Rev. Msgr. Benjamin F. Advíncula. 1566 was the year the Spaniards arrived in the island of Panay and became the second Spanish settlement in the country next to Cebu.

Miguel López de Legazpi transferred the Spanish settlement from Cebu to Panay in 1569 due to the lack of food. The town was formally founded in 1572 (1581 according to Jorde), although by that time López de Legazpi had moved the capital of the Philippines, further north, to Manila. Fr. Bartolomé de Alcántara was named the prior of the town with Fr. Agustín Camacho as assistant. A prosperous town due to trade, Panay was capital of the province of Capiz for two centuries until it changed to the town of Capiz (present-day Roxas). The town name was eventually given to whole island. After 1607, Fr. Alonso de Méntrida, noted for his linguistic studies and Visayan dictionary became prior. In the 18th century, Panay was famous for its textile industry which produced a cloth called suerte and exported to Europe. In the 19th century, Don Antonio Roxas, grandfather of Pres. Manuel Roxas, opened one of the largest rum and wine distilleries in the town. The Augustinians held the parish until 1898, when administration transferred to the seculars.

The first church was built before 1698 when it was reported to be destroyed by a typhoon. In 1774, Fr. Miguel Murguía rebuilt the church, but was again damaged by a typhoon on January 15, 1875. Fr. José Beloso restored the church in 1884. The church is best known for its 10.4 ton bell popularly called dakong lingganay (big bell). The bell was cast by Don Juan Reina who settled in Iloilo in 1868. Reina, who was the town dentist, was also noted for being a metal caster and smith. The bell was cast in Panay from 70 sacks of coins donated by the townspeople. The bell was completed in 1878. It bears an inspiring inscription which translated reads: “I am God’s voice which shall echo praise from one end of the town of Panay to the other, so that Christ’s faithful followers may enter this house of God to receive heavenly graces.”

== Geography ==
Panay is 8 kilometres (5.0 mi) east from Roxas City.

=== Barangays ===
Panay is politically subdivided into 42 barangays. Each barangay consists of puroks and some have sitios.

- Agbalo
- Agbanban
- Agojo
- Anhawon
- Bagacay
- Bago Chiquito
- Bago Grande
- Bahit
- Bantique
- Bato
- Binangig
- Binantuan
- Bonga
- Buntod
- Butacal
- Cabugao Este
- Cabugao Oeste
- Calapawan
- Calitan
- Candual
- Cogon
- Daga
- Ilamnay
- Jamul-awon
- Lanipga
- Lat-asan
- Libon
- Linao
- Linateran
- Lomboy
- Lus-onan
- Magubilan
- Navitas
- Pawa
- Pili
- Poblacion Ilawod
- Poblacion Ilaya
- Poblacion Tabuc
- Talasa
- Tanza Norte
- Tanza Sur
- Tico

=== Climate ===
Climate data for Panay, Capiz
Month	Jan	Feb	Mar	Apr	May	Jun	Jul	Aug	Sep	Oct	Nov	Dec	Year
Mean daily maximum °C (°F)	27 (81)	28 (82)	29 (84)	31 (88)	32 (90)	31 (88)	30 (86)	30 (86)	29 (84)	29 (84)	29 (84)	27 (81)	29 (85)
Mean daily minimum °C (°F)	23 (73)	23 (73)	23 (73)	24 (75)	25 (77)	25 (77)	24 (75)	24 (75)	24 (75)	24 (75)	24 (75)	23 (73)	24 (75)
Average precipitation mm (inches)	61 (2.4)	39 (1.5)	46 (1.8)	48 (1.9)	90 (3.5)	144 (5.7)	152 (6.0)	145 (5.7)	163 (6.4)	160 (6.3)	120 (4.7)	90 (3.5)	1,258 (49.4)
Average rainy days	12.3	9.0	9.9	10.0	18.5	25.0	27.4	26.0	25.9	24.9	17.9	14.2	221
Source: Meteoblue

== Demographics ==
Population census of Panay
Year	Pop.	±% p.a.
1903	14,361	—
1918	13,409	−0.46%
1939	15,800	+0.78%
1948	16,648	+0.58%
1960	19,952	+1.52%
1970	24,074	+1.89%
1975	27,479	+2.69%
1980	31,650	+2.87%
1990	36,817	+1.52%
1995	39,124	+1.15%
2000	40,599	+0.80%
2007	42,357	+0.59%
2010	43,449	+0.93%
2015	46,114	+1.14%
2020	48,890	+1.24%
2024	50,946	+0.99%
Source: Philippine Statistics Authority

In the 2024 census, the population of Panay, Capiz, was 50,946 people, with a density of 440 inhabitants per square kilometre or 1,100 inhabitants per square mile.

== Economy ==
Poverty incidence of Panay (%)

Source: Philippine Statistics Authority

== Education ==
The Panay Schools District Office governs all educational institutions within the municipality. It oversees the management and operations of all private and public, from primary to secondary schools.

Primary and elementary schools

- Agbalo Elementary School
- Agbanban Elementary School
- Agojo Elementary School
- Anhawon Elementary School
- Bagacay Elementary School
- Bantigue Elementary School
- Bato Primary School
- Binantuan Primary School
- Bonga Elementary School
- Buntod Elementary School
- Butacal Elementary School
- Calapawan Elementary School
- Daga Elementary School
- Eugenio Regalado Elem.School
- Good Shepherd Tutorial Learning Center
- Jamul-awon Elementary School
- Justice Jose Hontiveros Memorial School
- Lanipga Primary School
- Lat-asan Primary School
- Libon Elementary School
- Linao Elementary School
- Lus-onan Elementary School
- Magubilan Elementary School
- Navitas Elementary School
- Panay Central School
- Pawa Elementary School
- Ricardo Bernas Elementary School
- Tanza Norte Elementary School
- Tanza Sur Elementary School

Secondary schools

- Bago Chiquito Integrated School
- Capiz National High School
- Comsr. Luis R. Asis National High School
- Felix Balgos National High School
- Pawa National High School
